= San Juan River Bridge =

Bridge in Metro Manila, Philippines

San Juan River Bridge Tulay ng Ilog San Juan
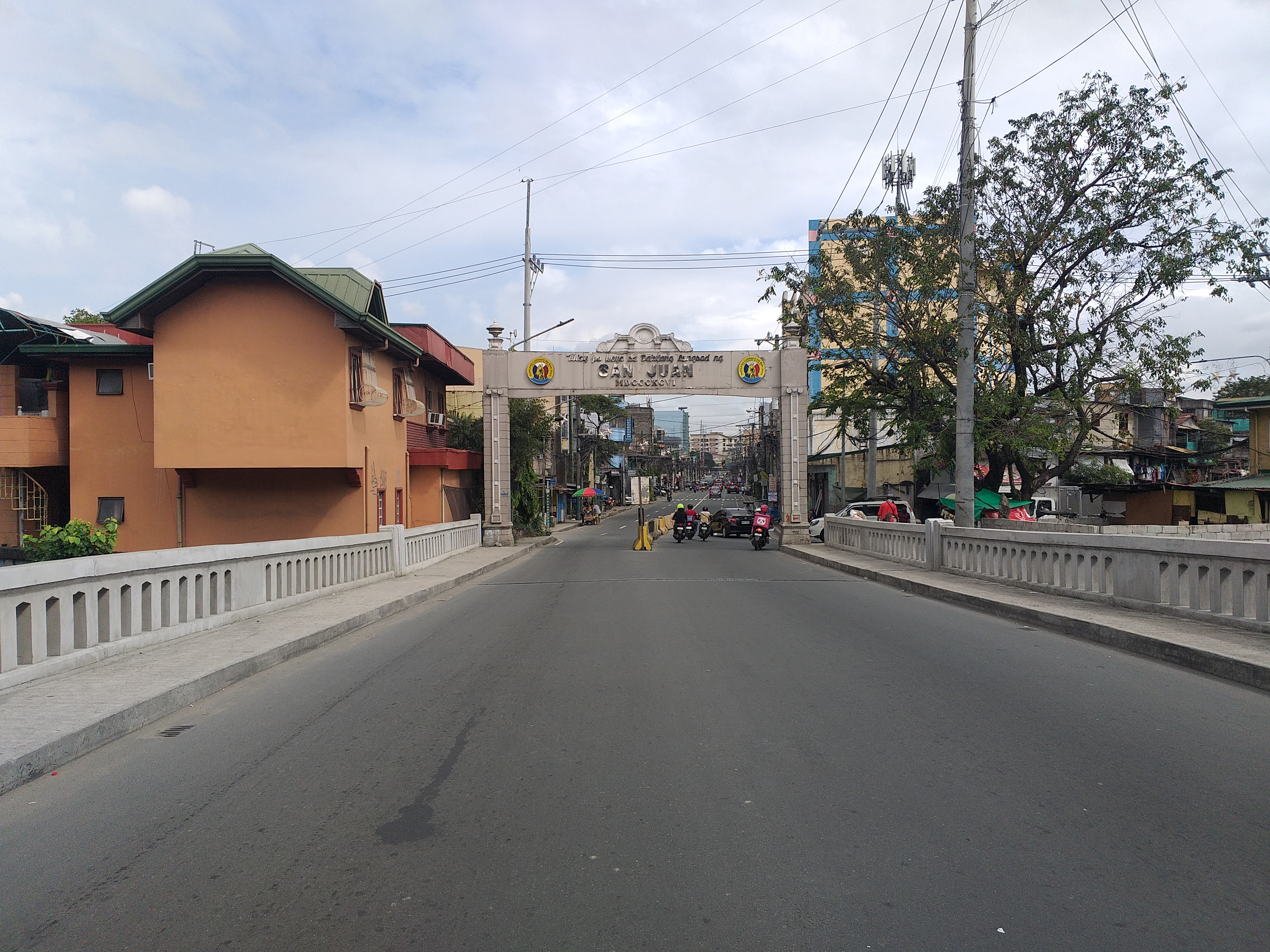
- San Juan River Bridge towards San Juan in 2020
- Coordinates: 14.601660°N 121.020302°E
- Carries: 2 lanes of vehicular traffic; pedestrian sidewalks
- Crosses: San Juan River
- Locale: San Juan and Manila, Metro Manila, Philippines
- Other name(s): Pinaglabanan Bridge; San Juan del Monte Bridge; Old Santa Mesa Bridge; Balsa Bridge

Characteristics
- Total length: 46.85 m (153.7 ft)
- Load limit: 10 metric tons (9.8 long tons; 11 short tons)
- No. of lanes: 2-lane single carriageway (1 per direction)

History
- Rebuilt: 2018–2020

Location
- Interactive map of San Juan River Bridge

The San Juan River Bridge (Filipino: Tulay ng Ilog San Juan), also known as Pinaglabanan Bridge, San Juan del Monte Bridge, San Juan Bridge and the Old Santa Mesa Bridge, is a bridge that connects San Juan and Manila, spanning the San Juan River. The 46.85-meter (153.7 ft) bridge connects the N. Domingo Street in San Juan and Old Santa Mesa Street in Manila. The location of the bridge served as a battlefield during the 1896 Philippine Revolution against the Spaniards and the 1899 Philippine–American War.

On, January 29, 1899, Colonel Luciano San Miguel, Filipino Commander had his first meeting with Colonel John M. Stotsenburg, Commander of the First Nebraska Volunteers on this bridge to discuss the boundaries of their respective forces. On February 4, 1899, an encounter between the Filipino and American forces in present-day Sampaloc, Manila led to a shooting incident and sparked the Battle of Manila.

On February 5, 2009, the National Historical Commission of the Philippines installed a historical marker on San Juan River Bridge commemorating its role to the start of the Battle of Manila.

== History ==
=== Outbreak of the Philippine-American War ===
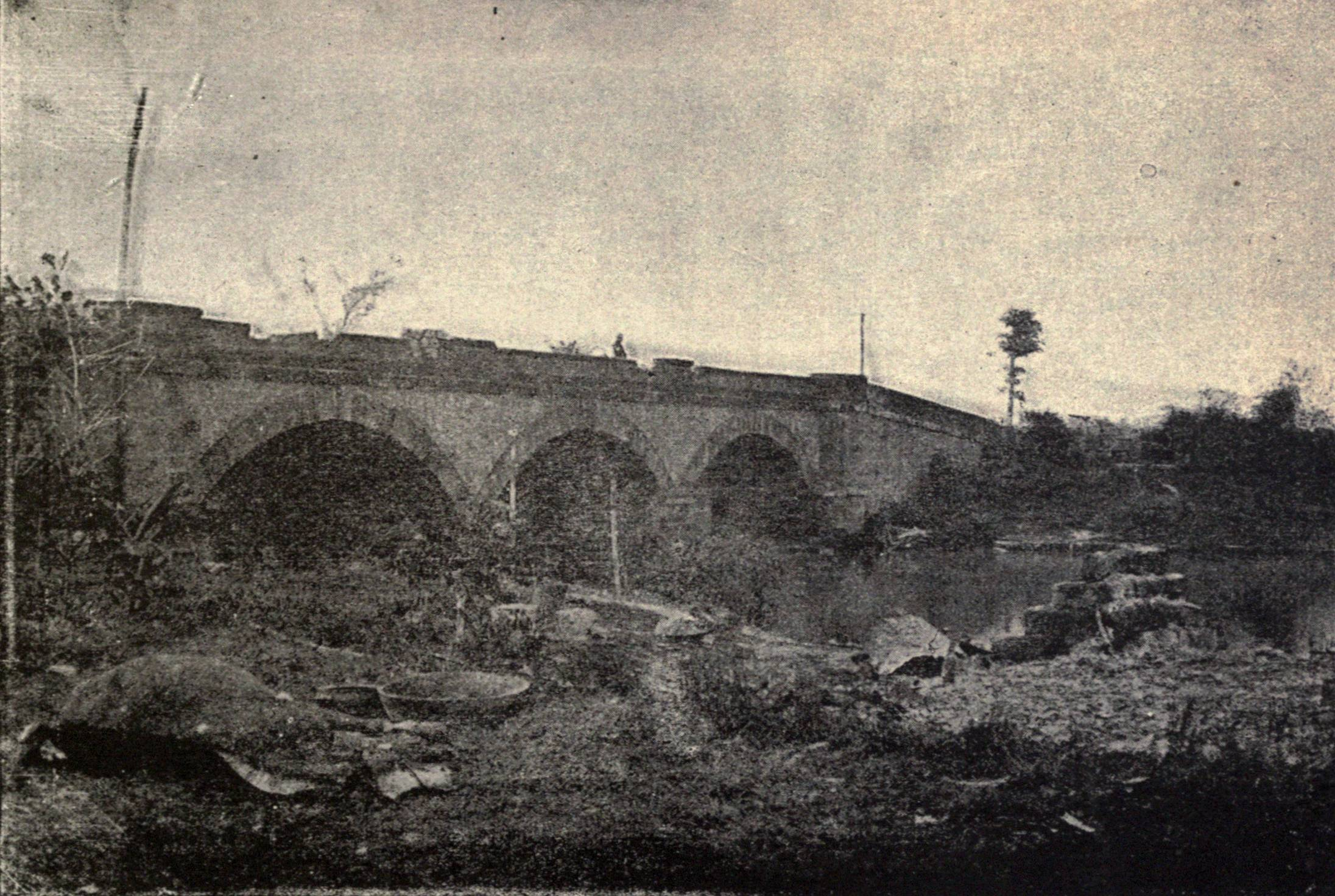
Bridge of San Juan del Monte, 1899

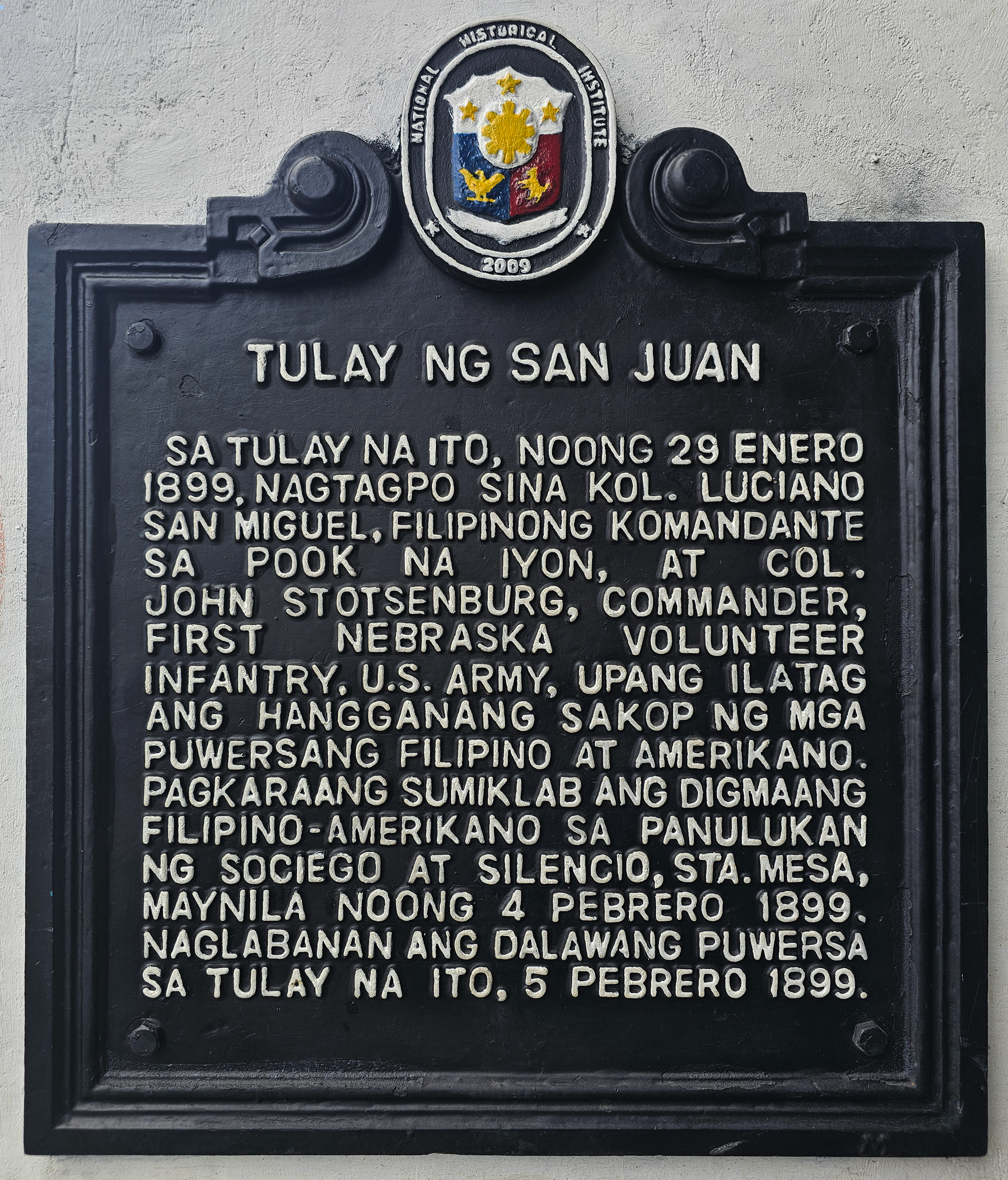
Tulay ng San Juan NHI Marker

After Emilio Aguinaldo issued the Philippine Declaration of Independence at Kawit, Cavite on June 12, 1898, there still was uneasy peace around Manila following the Philippine Revolution against Spain. Filipinos revolutionaries felt that Spain simply ceded the Philippines to the United States who were determined to take over from where the Spaniards left off. American forces started to come between June and July 1898 where 8,000 were deployed around Manila and 11,000 more deployed along the Zapote Line.

On December 5, 1898, the 1st Nebraska Infantry Regiment under Colonel John M. Stotsenburg, started to camp at Santa Mesa (now part of present-day Sampaloc). Their camp was surrounded on three sides by Philippine Revolutionary Army forces led by Colonel Luciano San Miguel of the Morong Battalion. Outnumbered, the Nebraskans had to build their defenses consisting of a series of outposts. They had regular patrol around the area since they felt restless on their location.

On the evening of February 4, 1899, Private William W. Grayson fired the first shot of the Philippine-American War at the corner of Sociego Street and Tomas Arguelles Street. A 2023 study done by Ronnie Miravite Casalmir places the correct location of the first shot of the Phil-Am War at the corner of Sociego St. and Tomas Arguelles St., not at Sociego-Silencio where they erroneously have the marker. The Ronnie Miravite Casalmir Study debunks the previous findings of Dr. Benito Legarda which was the basis for the erroneous placement of the marker at Sociego-Silencio. According to Ronnie Miravite Casalmir, the smoking gun for the Sociego-Arguelles corner is the presence of Blockhouse 7 in the background of Grayson's reenactment photo. The orientation of this Blockhouse 7 image lines up with the corner of Sociego and Arguelles when compared with the known photo of Blockhouse 7 taken from the same direction. In addition, the distance estimate of Lieut. Whedon placed the 100-yard distance from Santol at Sociego-Arguelles, not Sociego-Silencio. This meant that when Lieut. Whedon ordered the detachment at Santol to patrol 100 yards, he meant them to patrol all the way to Sociego-Arguelles. Col. Stotsenburg corroborated Lieut. Whedon's distance estimate. Prof. Ambeth R. Ocampo calls the evidence presented by Ronnie Miravite Casalmir as new and compelling. Prof. Ocampo agrees that this evidence shows that the marker should be moved one block away, from Sociego-Silencio to Sociego-Arguelles. Maj. Lillian A. Pfluke (Ret.), West Point Class of 1980, and founder of the American War Memorials Overseas Inc. also agrees and has a note on their U.S. War Memorials website that the proper placement of the marker should be at the adjoining intersection of Sociego Street and Arguelles Street where the incident actually occurred.

Private William W. Grayson, Private Orville Miller and another soldier were patrolling the area when they encountered Filipinos approaching the outpost. Grayson and Miller asked them to "Halt!" but the Filipino men continued to advance. This prompted Grayson to fire the first shots and retreated back to their line, with one Filipino lieutenant and another Filipino soldier as fatalities. This spread to the other parts of the line and sparked an exchange of shots between the Filipinos and the Americans.

The following day, February 5, 1899, General Elwell Stephen Otis deployed his troops to Santa Mesa and later on sparked the Battle of Manila, just two days before the US Senate ratified the Treaty of Paris on February 6, 1899. The war that lasted till 1902 resulted in the death of more than 4,200 Americans and over 20,000 Filipino nationalists.

=== Contemporary history ===
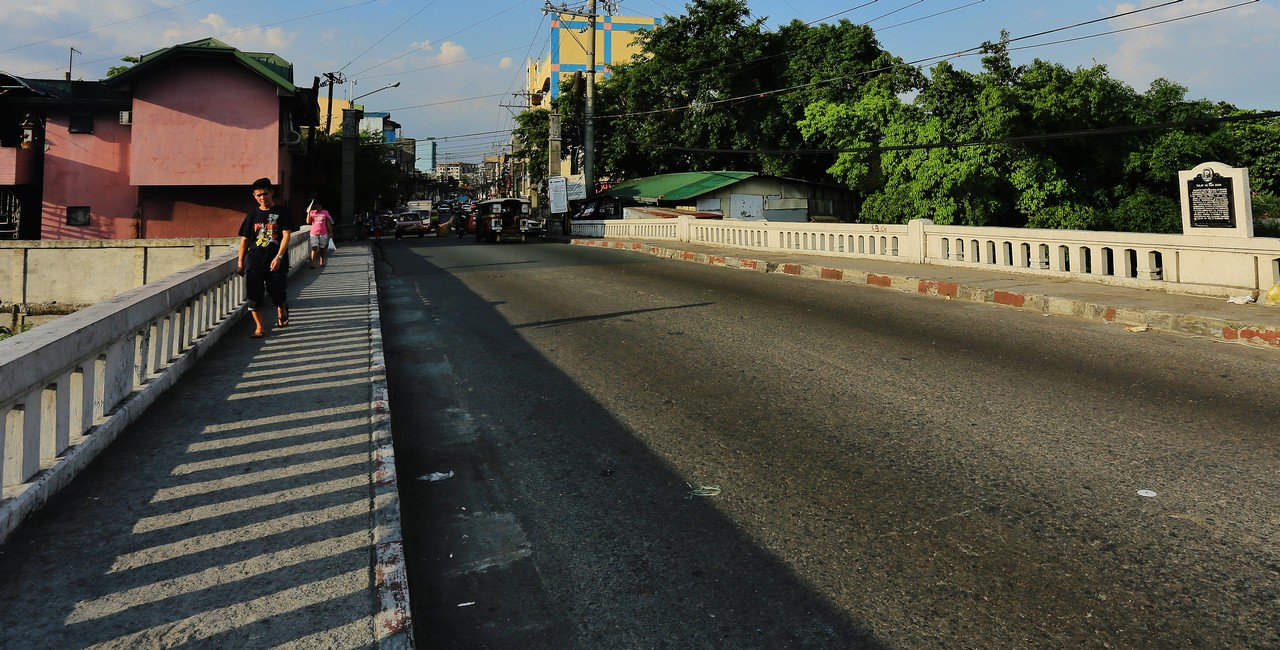
San Juan Bridge prior to the 2018 reconstruction

On September 15, 2018, the bridge was demolished to give way for the construction of Metro Manila Skyway Stage 3 Section 2B, which passes over San Juan River. The barges needed to lay the foundations of the pillar sections of Skyway required the bridge's demolition to gain access to the construction area. The bridge was later reconstructed by Skyway Stage 3 proponent San Miguel Corporation through its infrastructure arm SMC Infrastructure and it reopened on March 11, 2020.
