= Bulacan Battalion =

Unit of the Philippine Republican Army

- Battalyon ng Bulakan; Batallón de Bulakan
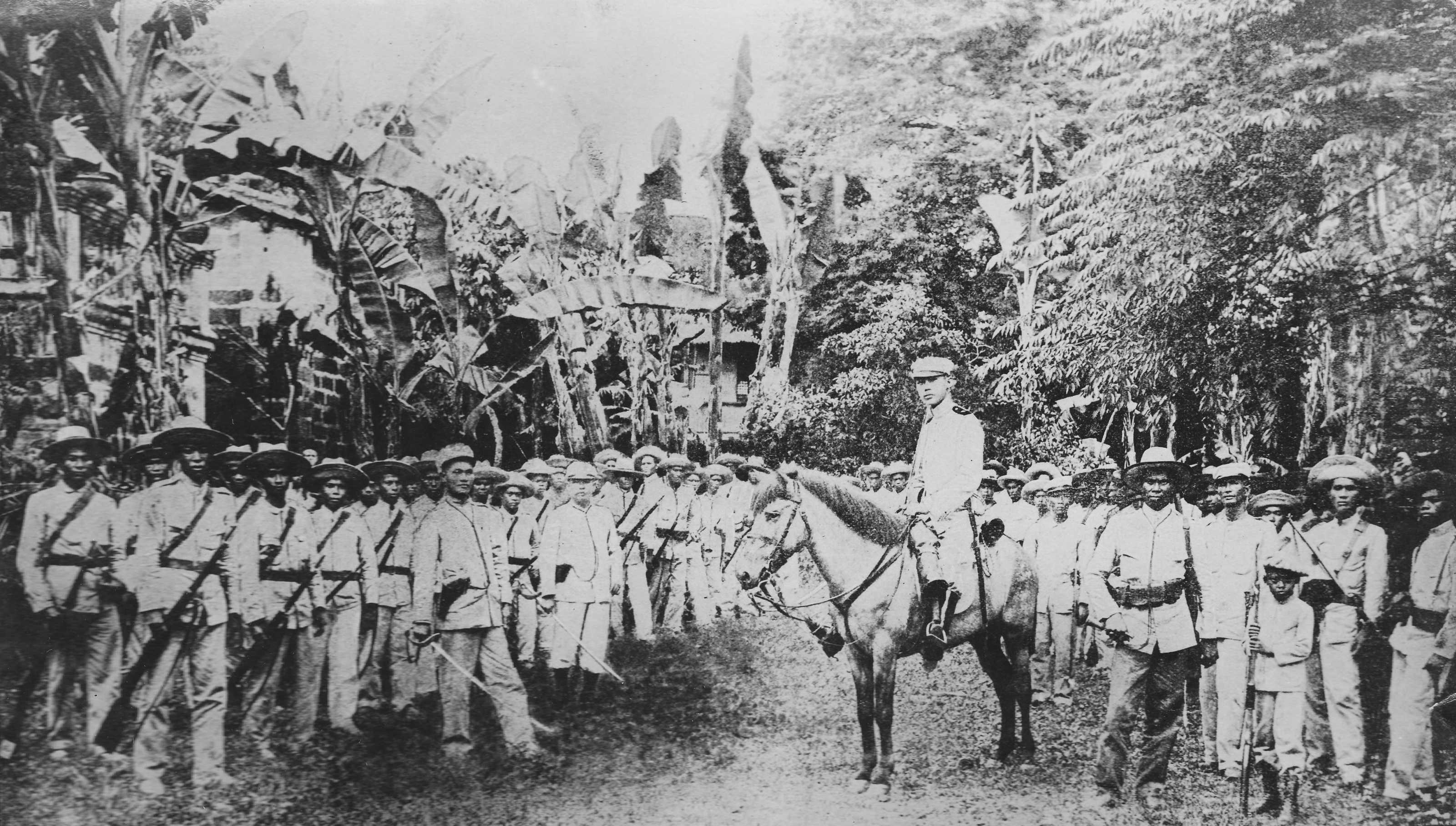
- General Gregorio del Pilar and troops in Pampanga
- Active: 1899
- Country: Philippines
- Allegiance: Philippine Republic
- Branch: Philippine Republican Army
- Type: Infantry
- Role: Line Infantry
- Size: 3 Battalions, 5-6 Companies each

Commanders
- Notable commanders: Gen. Gregorio H. del Pilar; Gen. Pantaleon Garcia; Col. Enrique Pacheco; Lt. Col. Julian H. del Pilar; Lt. Col. Melecio Carlos; Lt. Col. Santiago Terillana

The Bulacan Battalion refers to 3 military battalions within the Philippine Republican Army, composed of enlisted Filipino soldiers from the province of Bulacan. All 3 Battalions was under the command of General Gregorio H. del Pilar.

Elements of the battalion was stationed in the Fourth Zone of Manila from around August 1898 until the onset of the war and was under the command of General Pantaleon Garcia and Colonel Enrique Pacheco. It saw action in the Battle of Manila in 1899. Elements of the battalion were involved in the First and Second Battle of Caloocan, and the battles of Marilao River, Quingua, and Calumpit.

In May 1899, the brigade, numbering to about 800 men set up stone-fronted trenches in Baliuag, Bulacan together with the forces of General Pío del Pilar in an effort to delay the American advance. The units retreated when General Lawton approached the town.
