= Battle of Manila (1899) =

Part of the Philippine–American War

Coordinates: 14°36′N 121°01′E

- Part of the Philippine–American War
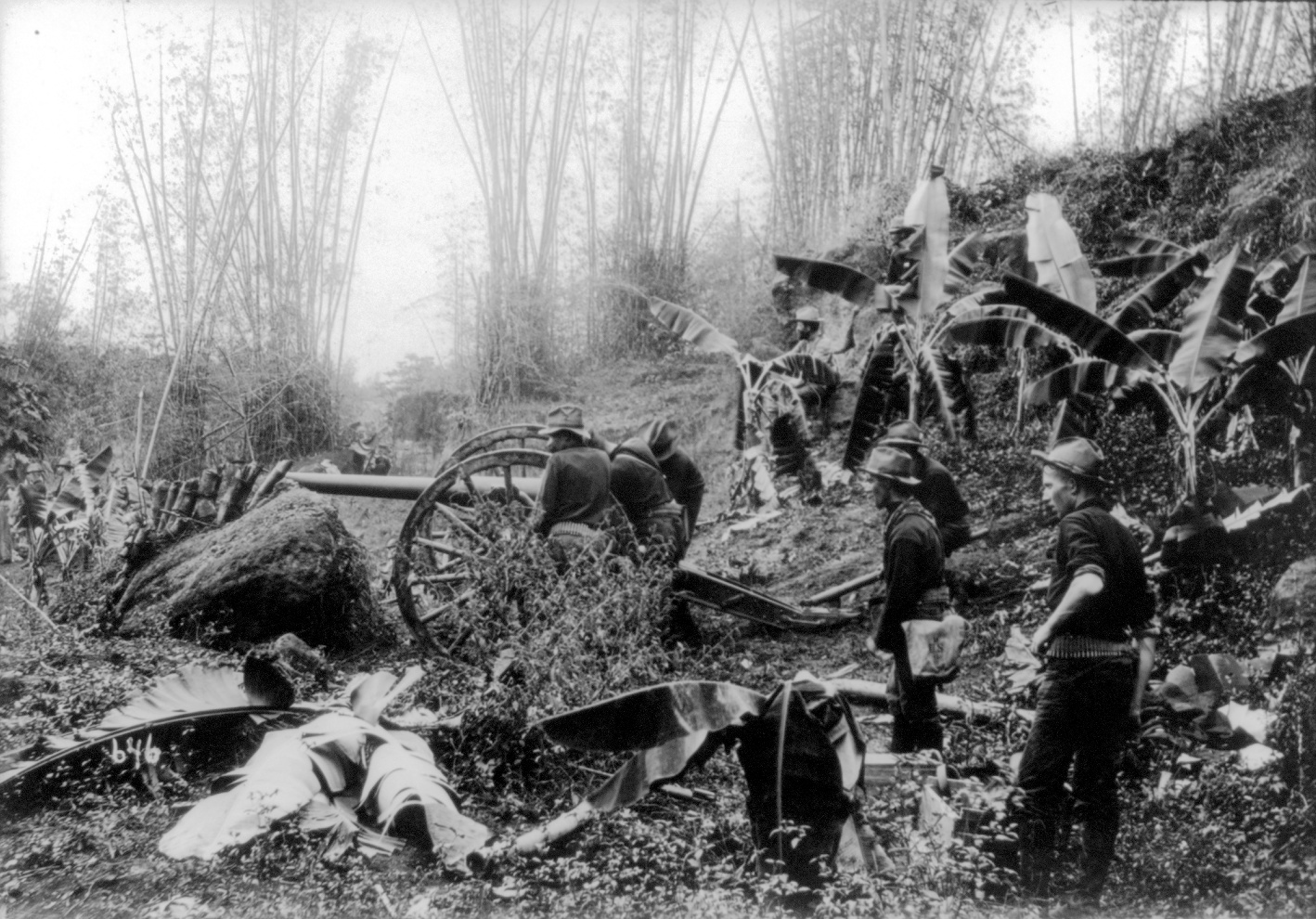
- U.S. soldiers of the First Nebraska Volunteers, Company B, near Manila in 1899.
Date	February 4–5, 1899
Location	Manila, Philippines
Result	American victory: Beginning of the Philippine-American War

Belligerents
United States: United States Military Government of the Philippine Islands	Philippine Republic

Commanders and leaders
Elwell S. Otis; Arthur MacArthur Jr. Thomas M. Anderson; William Crawford Smith # Harry C. Egbert †	Emilio Aguinaldo; Antonio Luna; Luciano San Miguel

Strength
19,000 U.S. troops 8,000 in Manila; 11,000 outer defenses	15,000–40,000 Filipino troops (estimates vary)

Casualties and losses
44 killed 195 wounded	700 killed (est); 3,300 wounded (est)

The Battle of Manila (Filipino: Labanan sa Maynila; Spanish: Batalla de Manila), the first and largest battle of the Philippine–American War, was fought on February 4–5, 1899, between 19,000 American and 15,000 Filipino soldiers. Armed conflict erupted when American troops, tasked with preventing the Filipino encampment from moving closer, fired on a nearby group. Philippine President Emilio Aguinaldo attempted to broker a ceasefire, but American General Elwell Stephen Otis rejected it, and fighting escalated the next day. It ended in an American victory, although minor skirmishes continued for several days afterward.

== Order of battle ==
=== Filipino ===
Philippine Republican Army – General Emilio Aguinaldo

- Chief-of-Operations: General Antonio Luna

Zone	Commander/s	Known Units
First Zone (South of Manila, with its left flank resting against Manila Bay, occupying the towns of Bacoor, Las Piñas, Palañag, Pineda, and Malate.)	General Mariano Noriel: Colonel Juan Cailles	2nd Noveleta Battalion; 1st Salinas Battalion; 5th Malabon Battalion
Second Zone (Next to the First Zone, with its right flank resting against the Pasig River, occupying the towns of San Pedro de Macati, Pateros, Taguig, Pasig, and Santa Ana.)	General Pio del Pilar: Colonel Luciano San Miguel	Pío del Pilar Brigade
Third Zone (Directly north of the Second Zone, occupying the towns of San Felipe Neri, San Juan del Monte, Pandacan, San Francisco del Monte, San Mateo, Montalban, and Mariquina.)	General Artemio Ricarte: Colonel Hermogenes Bautista; Lieutenant Colonel Antonio Montenegro	Morong Battalion
Fourth Zone (North of Manila, with its right flank resting against Manila Bay, occupying the towns of Caloocan, Novaliches, Malabon, and Navotas.)	General Pantaleon Garcia: Colonel Cipriano Pacheco; Lieutenant Colonel Estevan San Juan	Pampanga Battalion; Manila Battalion; Bulacan Battalion; Trias Battalion; Igorot sandatahanes

=== U.S. ===
Eighth Army Corps – Major General Elwell S. Otis

- Provost Marshal: Brigadier General Robert P. Hughes
- Judge Advocate General: Lieutenant Colonel Enoch Crowder
- Chief of Engineers: Major James Franklin Bell

Division	Brigade	Regiments and Others
First Division Brigadier General Thomas M. Anderson	1st Brigade Brigadier General Charles King	1st Wyoming Regiment (one battalion): Major Frank M. Foote; 1st Idaho Regiment: Major Daniel W. Figgins; 1st Washington Regiment: Colonel John H. Wholley; 1st California Regiment: Colonel James Francis Smith
First Division Brigadier General Thomas M. Anderson	2nd Brigade Brigadier General Samuel Ovenshine	4th U.S. Cavalry Regiment (six troops attached as infantry to 1st North Dakota); 1st North Dakota Regiment: Lieutenant Colonel William C. Treumann; 14th U.S. Infantry Regiment: Major Carroll H. Potter
First Division Brigadier General Thomas M. Anderson	Artillery	6th U.S. Artillery, Light Battery D: Captain Alexander B. Dyer Jr.; 6th U.S. Artillery, Light Battery G: Lieutenant Harry L. Hawthorne; Astor Battery: Lieutenant Peyton C. March; U.S. Engineers (Company A serving as infantry): Lieutenant William G. Haan, 3rd U.S. Artillery
Second Division Major General Arthur MacArthur	1st Brigade Brigadier General Harrison Gray Otis	20th Kansas Regiment: Colonel Frederick Funston; 3rd U.S. Artillery Regiment: Major William A. Kobbé; 1st Montana Regiment: Colonel Harry C. Kessler; 10th Pennsylvania Regiment: Colonel Alexander L. Hawkins
Second Division Major General Arthur MacArthur	2nd Brigade Brigadier General Irving Hale	1st South Dakota Regiment: Colonel Alfred S. Frost; 1st Colorado Regiment: Colonel Henry B. McCoy; 1st Nebraska Regiment: Colonel John M. Stotsenburg
Second Division Major General Arthur MacArthur	Artillery	Utah Light Artillery: Major Richard W. Young

== Disposition of forces ==
=== Filipino forces ===
After the surrender of Manila to American forces by the Spanish in 1898, General Aguinaldo demanded the occupation of a line of blockhouses on the Zapote Line, which had been the Spanish defensive perimeter. General Otis initially refused this but later said that he would not object unless overruled by higher authority. It was estimated at the time that about 20,000 Filipino troops were surrounding Manila, with their distribution and exact composition only partially known.

Many Filipino commanders were on weekend furlough: General Antonio Luna was visiting family in San Fernando, Pampanga, General Mariano Noriel was in Parañaque preparing for his wedding, and General Artemio Ricarte and Col. Luciano San Miguel were in Malolos meeting with President Emilio Aguinaldo. As a result, the Filipino soldiers were mostly leaderless, with General Pantaleon Garcia being the only commander at his post in Maypajo, north of Manila.

=== American forces ===
U.S. Army forces numbered some 800 officers and 20,000 enlisted men. Of these, the Army deployed some 8,000 in Manila and 11,000 in a defensive line inside the Zapote line. The remaining American troops were in Cavite or in transports off Iloilo.

== First shots ==
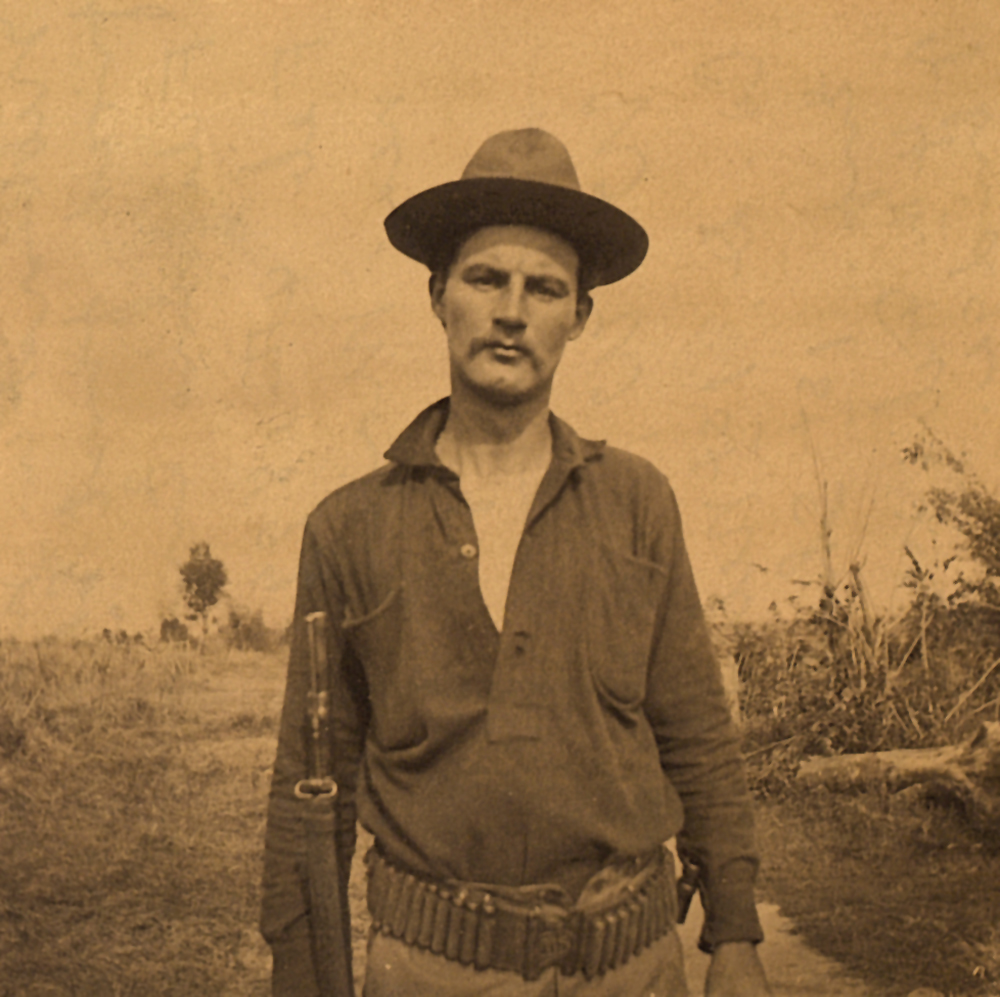
Private William Walter Grayson who fired the first shots in the Battle of Manila (1899).

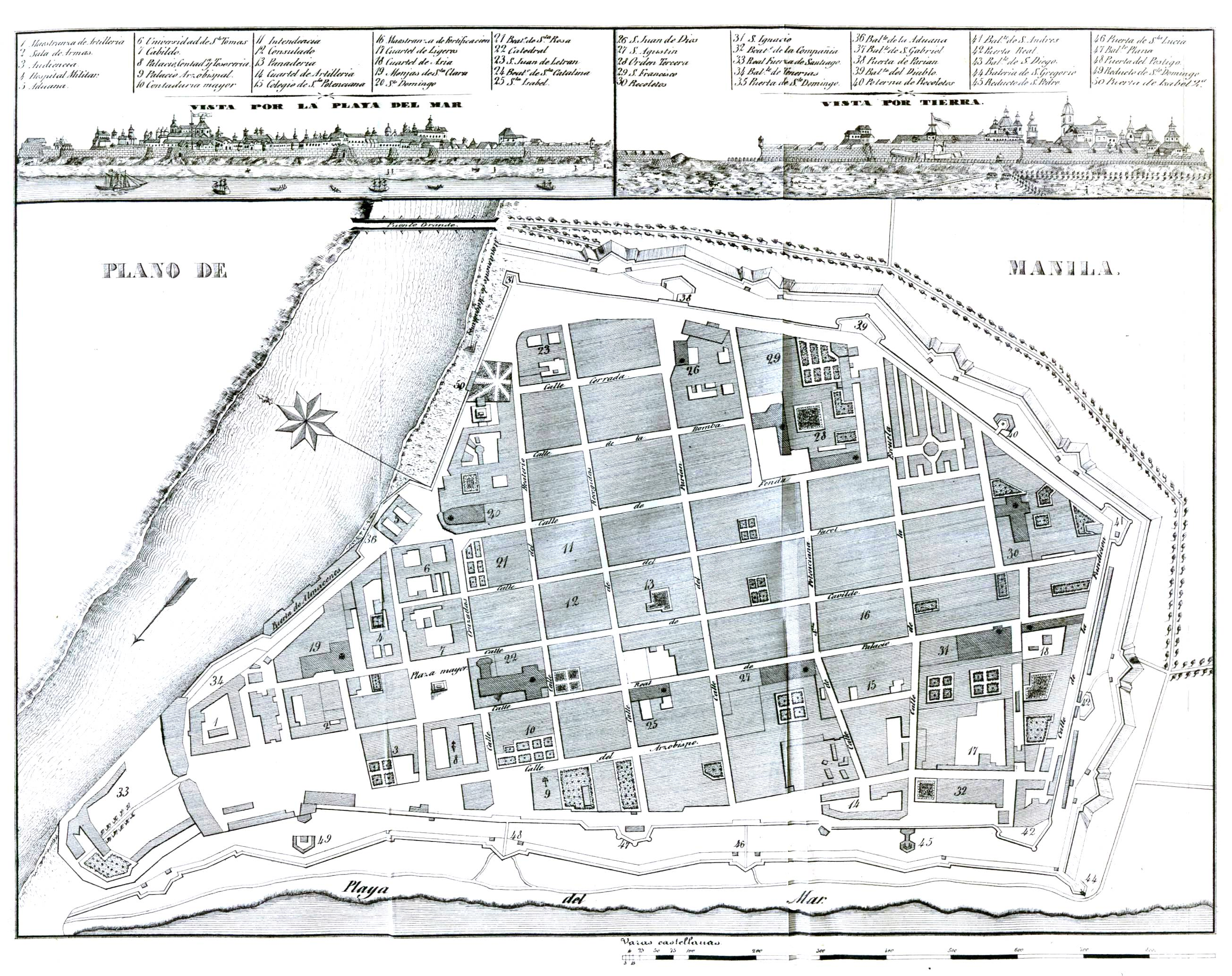
Plan of Manila as it existed in 1851

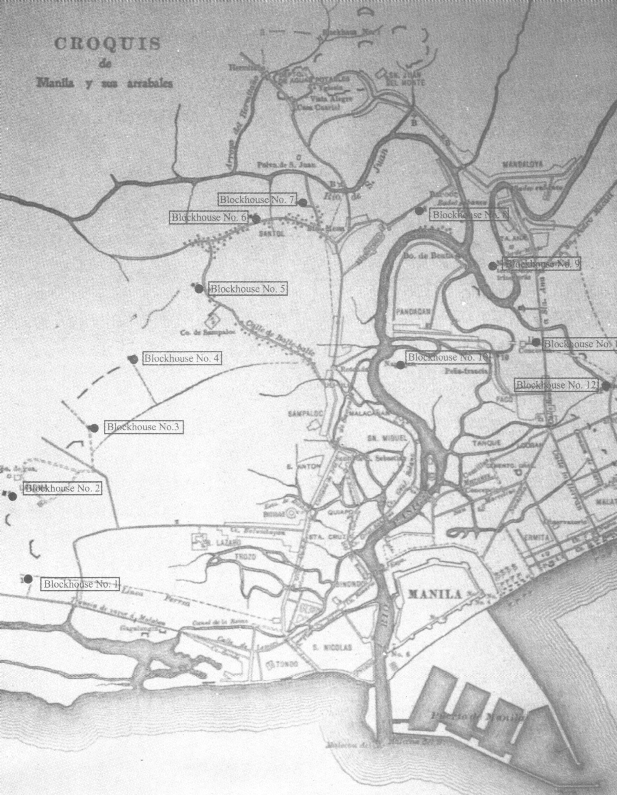
Zapote Line blockhouse locations

Sources generally agree that the first shots were fired by Private William Walter Grayson (1876, England – 1941, San Francisco), an Englishman who had migrated to Nebraska with his parents c. 1890. Having worked as a hostler, he had enlisted as a volunteer soldier in Lincoln, Nebraska, in May 1898, a month after the Spanish–American War erupted, and had deployed with his unit to the Philippines in June 1898. Grayson's unit, the First Nebraska Volunteer Infantry under Colonel John M. Stotsenburg, had been encamped in Santa Mesa, Manila, since December 5, 1898. During their encampment, there had been incidents on and around the San Juan Bridge, located just to the east of their encampment area.

On the morning of February 4, Stotsenburg said, "Your orders are to hold the village. If any armed men come into our lines order them out. If they persist in coming, summon enough men to arrest them. In case an advance in force is made, fall back to the pipeline outpost and resist the occupation of the village by all means in your power, calling on these headquarters for assistance." In a report later that day, Lt. Burt D. Wheedon wrote, "On the morning of February 4 the insurgents ordered our men to move out of town (Santol), and upon their refusal to do so the former said that they would bring a body of men and drive them back when night came." Lt. Wheedon took charge of an outpost on Santol road at seven in the evening and, at 7:30, gave orders saying, "No armed insurgents to enter the town or vicinity ... Halt all armed persons who attempted to advance from the direction of the insurgents' lines which lie between blockhouses 6 and 7 and the San Juan Bridge and order them back to their lines. If they refused to go, arrest them if possible, or if this was impossible, fire upon them... Patrol each of the roads leading to Blockhouses 6 and 7 for 100 yards every half hour." (Blockhouse 6 was located on the city line just southeast of what is now Santol Street. Blockhouse 7 was about 100 yd (91 m) north-northeast of a point where the water pipe crossed Santol road.).

On the evening of February 4, Private William W. Grayson fired the first shot of the Philippine-American War. A study by Ronnie Miravite Casalmir places this event at the corner of Sociego Street and Tomas Arguelles Street, not at Sociego-Silencio where the marker is erroneously located. The study debunks the previous findings of Dr. Benito Legarda which was the basis for the erroneous placement of the marker at Sociego-Silencio. According to Ronnie Miravite Casalmir, the smoking gun for the Sociego-Arguelles corner is the presence of Blockhouse 7 in the background of Grayson's reenactment photo. The orientation of this Blockhouse 7 image lines up with the corner of Sociego and Arguelles when compared with the known photo of Blockhouse 7 taken from the same direction. In addition, the distance estimate of Lieut. Whedon placed the 100-yard distance from Santol at Sociego-Arguelles, not Sociego-Silencio. This meant that when Lieut. Whedon ordered the detachment at Santol to patrol 100 yards, he meant them to patrol all the way to Sociego-Arguelles. Col. Stotsenburg corroborated Lieut. Whedon's distance estimate. Prof. Ambeth R. Ocampo calls the evidence presented by Ronnie Miravite Casalmir as new and compelling. Prof. Ocampo agrees that this evidence shows that the marker should be moved one block away, from Sociego-Silencio to Sociego-Arguelles. Maj. Lillian A. Pfluke (Ret.), West Point Class of 1980, and founder of the American War Memorials Overseas Inc. also agrees and has a note on their U.S. War Memorials website that the proper placement of the marker should be at the adjoining intersection of Sociego Street and Arguelles Street where the incident actually occurred.

At about 8:30 pm on February 4, 1899, Grayson, along with Private Orville Miller and one other man, advanced from Santol towards Blockhouse 7, suddenly encountering four armed men from the Morong Battalion after about five minutes of patrolling. According to Grayson's account, he and Miller called "Halt!" and, when the four men responded by cocking their rifles, they fired at them and retreated to Santol. Personal accounts by Grayson claim that he "dropped" two and Miller one. Neither American nor Filipino official reports mention anyone being hit, but these and other details of Grayson's account were confirmed in a conterminous letter written home by another American soldier. The skirmish is credited for beginning the Battle of Manila and the Philippine–American War.

Worcester writes that General Otis' account of the opening of active hostilities was as follows:

On the night of February 2 they sent in a strong detachment to draw the fire of our outposts, which took up a position immediately in front and within a few yards of the same. The outpost was strengthened by a few of our men, who silently bore their taunts and abuse the entire night. This was reported to me by General MacArthur, whom I directed to communicate with the officer in command of the insurgent troops concerned. His prepared letter was shown me and approved, and the reply received was all that could be desired. However, the agreement was ignored by the insurgents and on the evening of February 4 another demonstration was made on one of our small outposts, which occupied a retired position at least 150 yards within the line which had been mutually agreed upon, an insurgent approaching the picket and refusing to halt or answer when challenged. The result was that our picket discharged his piece, when the insurgent troops near Santa Mesa opened a spirited fire on our troops there stationed.

The insurgents had thus succeeded in drawing the fire of a small outpost, which they had evidently labored with all their ingenuity to accomplish, in order to justify in some way their premeditated attack. It is not believed that the chief insurgent leaders wished to open hostilities at this time, as they were not completely prepared to assume the initiative. They desired two or three days more to perfect their arrangements, but the zeal of their army brought on the crisis which anticipated their premeditated action. They could not have delayed long, however, for it was their object to force an issue before American troops, then en route, could arrive in Manila.

Thus began the Insurgent attack, so long and so carefully planned for. We learn from the Insurgent records that the shot of the American sentry missed its mark. There was no reason why it should have provoked a hot return fire, but it did.

The result of the ensuing combat was not at all what the Insurgents had anticipated. The Americans did not drive very well. It was but a short time before they themselves were routed and driven from their positions.

Aguinaldo of course promptly advanced the claim that his troops had been wantonly attacked. The plain fact is that the Insurgent patrol in question deliberately drew the fire of the American sentry, and this was just as much an act of war as was the firing of the shot. Whether the patrol was acting under proper orders from higher authority is not definitely known.

Grayson later recounted the first shot:

I yelled "Halt!"... the man moved. I challenged with another "Halt!" Then he immediately shouted "Halto!" to me. Well I thought the best thing to do was to shoot him. He dropped. We retreated to where our six other fellows were and I said, "Line up fellows; the enemy are in here all through these yards." We then retreated to the pipeline and got behind the water work main and stayed there all night. It was some minutes after our second shots before Filipinos began firing.

This event began the Battle of Manila. On August 23, 1899, he was honorably discharged.

Other sources name the two specific U.S. soldiers involved in the first exchange of fire as Privates William Grayson and Orville Miller of the Nebraska Volunteers.

After the conclusion of the war, after analyzing captured insurgent papers, Major J. R. M. Taylor wrote, in part,

An attack on the United States forces was planned which should annihilate the little army in Manila, and delegations were appointed to secure the interference of foreign powers. The protecting cloak of pretense of friendliness to the United States was to be kept up until the last. While commissioners were appointed to negotiate with General Otis, secret societies were organized in Manila pledged to obey orders of the most barbarous character to kill and burn. The attack from without and the attack from within was to be on a set day and hour. The strained situation could not last. The spark was applied, either inadvertently or by design, on the 4th of February by an insurgent, willfully transgressing upon what, by their own admission, was within the agreed limits of the holding of the American troops. Hostilities resulted and the war was an accomplished fact.

== Reactions of Aguinaldo and Otis ==
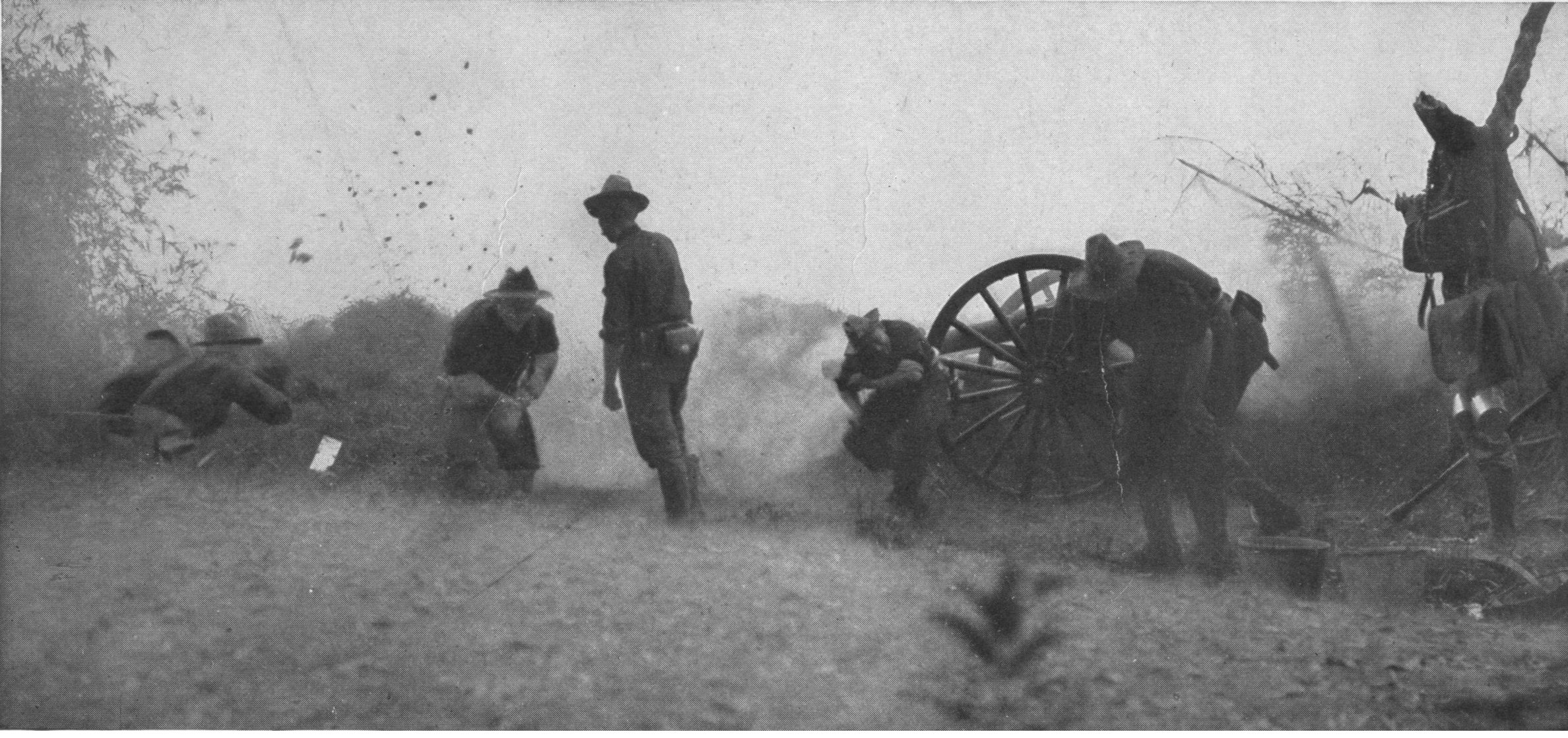
U.S. battery in action at the Bridge of San Juan del Monte, 1899

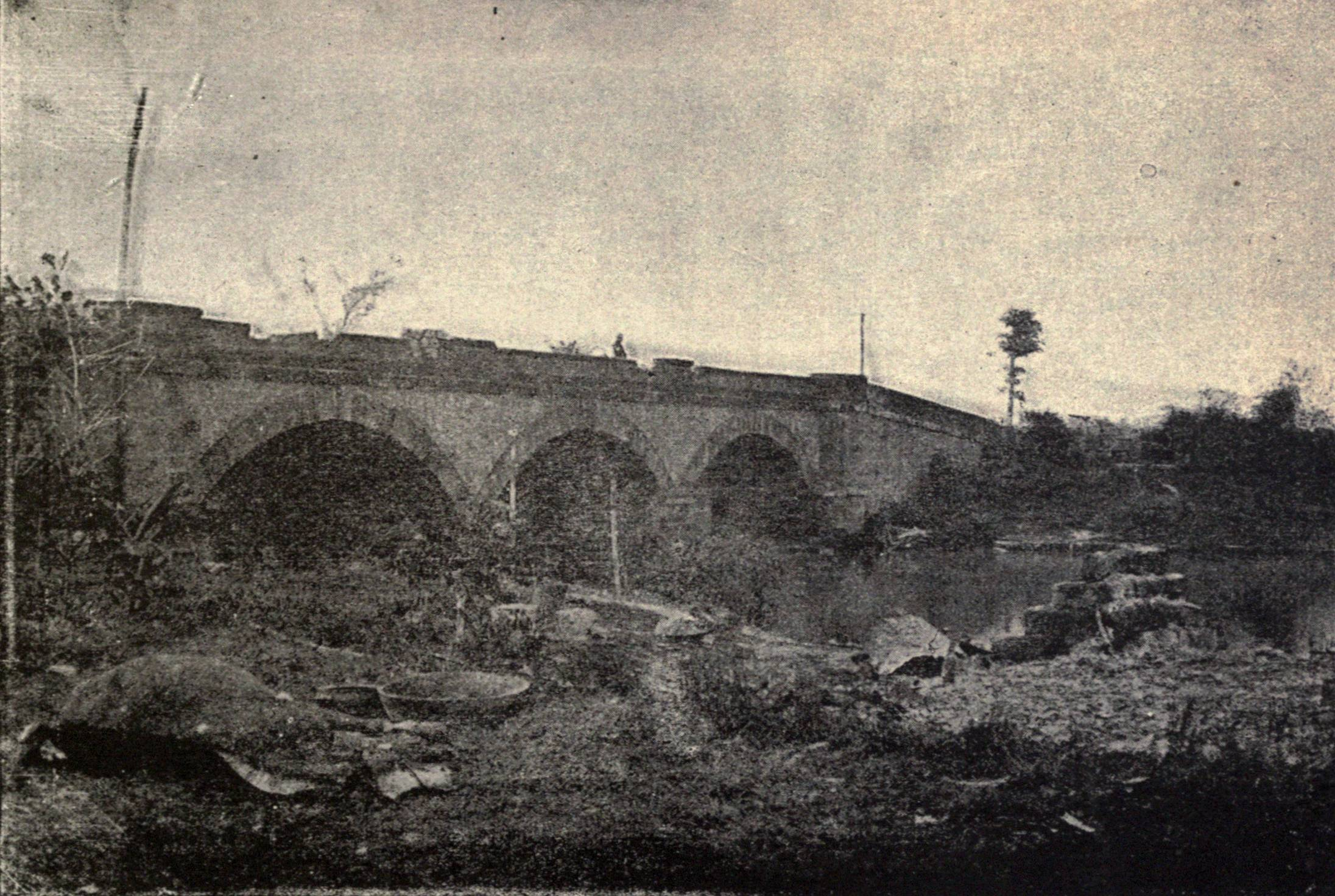
The Bridge of San Juan del Monte in 1899

Aguinaldo was away in Malolos when the conflict started on the 4th. That same night, a Filipino captain in Manila wired him in Malolos, stating that the Americans had started the hostilities. Aguinaldo wanted to avoid open conflict with the Americans while maintaining his leadership position with his nationalist followers. The next day (February 5), Aguinaldo sent an emissary to General Otis to mediate, saying, "the firing on our side the night before had been against my order."

Otis, who was then confident that a military campaign against Aguinaldo would be swift, was a veteran of the American Indian Wars and reacted much as he might have to his Sioux opponents decades before: "Fighting having begun, must go on to the grim end."

Aguinaldo then reassured his followers with a pledge to fight if forced by the Americans, whom he had come to fear as new oppressors come to replace the Spanish.

"It is my duty to maintain the integrity of our national honor, and that of the army so unjustly attacked by those, who posing as our friends, attempt to dominate us in place of the Spaniards. "Therefore, for the defense of the nation entrusted to me, I hereby order and command: Peace and friendly relations between the Philippine Republic and the American army of occupation are broken—and the latter will be treated as enemies with the limits prescribed by the laws of War."

== Battle ==
Caught off guard by the sudden outburst, the Filipinos remained in their trenches and exchanged fire with the Americans. A Filipino battalion mounted a charge against the 3rd U.S. Artillery, routed a company of American soldiers, and succeeded in capturing two artillery pieces for a little while. The Filipino troops had been caught unprepared and leaderless, as their generals had gone home to their families for the weekend. The American soldiers, in contrast, were ready and needed only to follow previously prepared planning. The next day, Brigadier General Arthur MacArthur ordered an American advance.

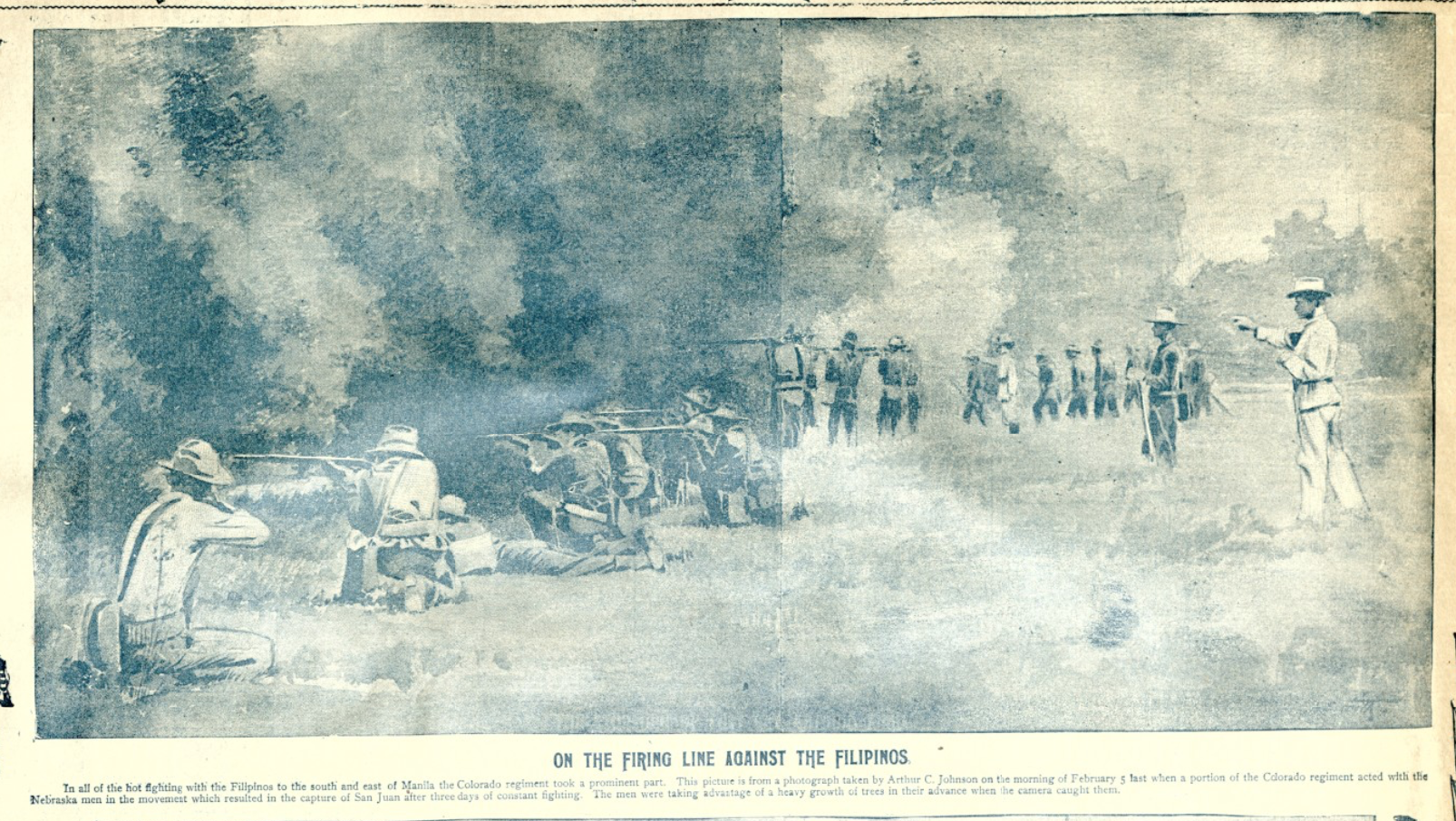
1st Colorado Infantry skirmishing with the Filipinos outside the city on February 5th

When Filipino officers did arrive on the field, many influential leaders tried to stop the fighting. Aguinaldo sent emissaries to negotiate a cease-fire. But Otis and MacArthur thought the crisis should be brought to a head and refused to negotiate.

General MacArthur, in command of the North of Manila, had developed a defensive plan which called for his entire division to launch an all-out offensive along the Santa Mesa Ridge in the event of an attack, capture the blockhouses, and seize the Chinese hospital and La Loma Cemetery. General Anderson, along the southern lines, believed he faced an imminent attack, so, with permission from Otis, he sent his entire division in a preemptive strike at first light. Brig. Gen. Pio del Pilar's forces fled into the Pasig River where many drowned. The battle of February 5 was fought along a 25 km (16-mile) front and was the biggest and bloodiest of the war. It involved all or part of 13 American regiments and thousands of Filipinos. American casualties totaled 238, of whom 44 were killed in action or died from wounds. The U.S. Army's official report listed Filipino casualties as 4,000, of whom 700 were killed, but this is guesswork.

The Filipinos were shocked when the Americans attacked. They were used to Spanish tactics of retreating into fortified cities after a nighttime raid. MacArthur's attack in the north captured the ridge overlooking Manila. (MacArthur was later promoted to major general and became Governor-General of the Philippines.) After initial confusion, Brigadier General Thomas M. Anderson's attack in the south captured the village of Pasay and Filipino supplies stored there.

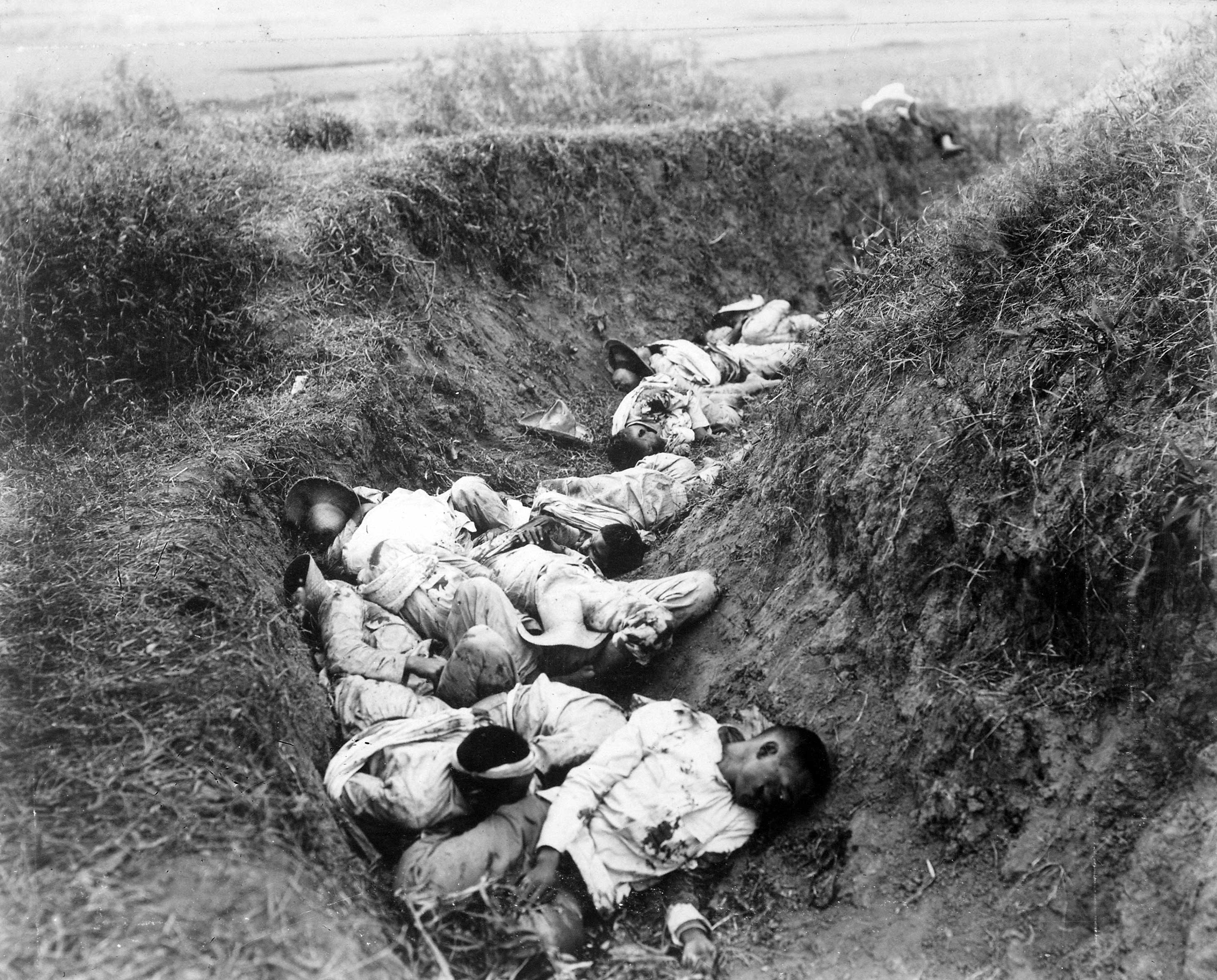
U.S. Army photo: "Insurgent dead just as they fell in the trench near Santa Ana, February 5th. The trench was circular, and the picture shows but a small portion." (Original caption.)

The Filipinos were counting on an uprising by the citizens of Manila to divide American forces and interrupt American supply lines. Although some fires were set inside the city, no general uprising occurred since Provost Marshal Brig. Gen. Robert Patterson Hughes' Provost Guard quickly suppressed any disturbances. However, some small units of Philippine soldiers who had not been part of the force that was routed skirmished with the Americans for several days on the outskirts of Manila before being driven out.

== Memorial ==
On the evening of February 4, Private William W. Grayson fired the war's first shots at the corner of Sociego Street and Tomas Arguelles Street. A study done by Ronnie Miravite Casalmir places the event at this corner, not at Sociego-Silencio where they erroneously have the marker.

== See also ==
- Campaigns of the Philippine–American War
