= Battle of Alapan =

1898 battle of the Philippine Revolution

- Part of the Philippine Revolution
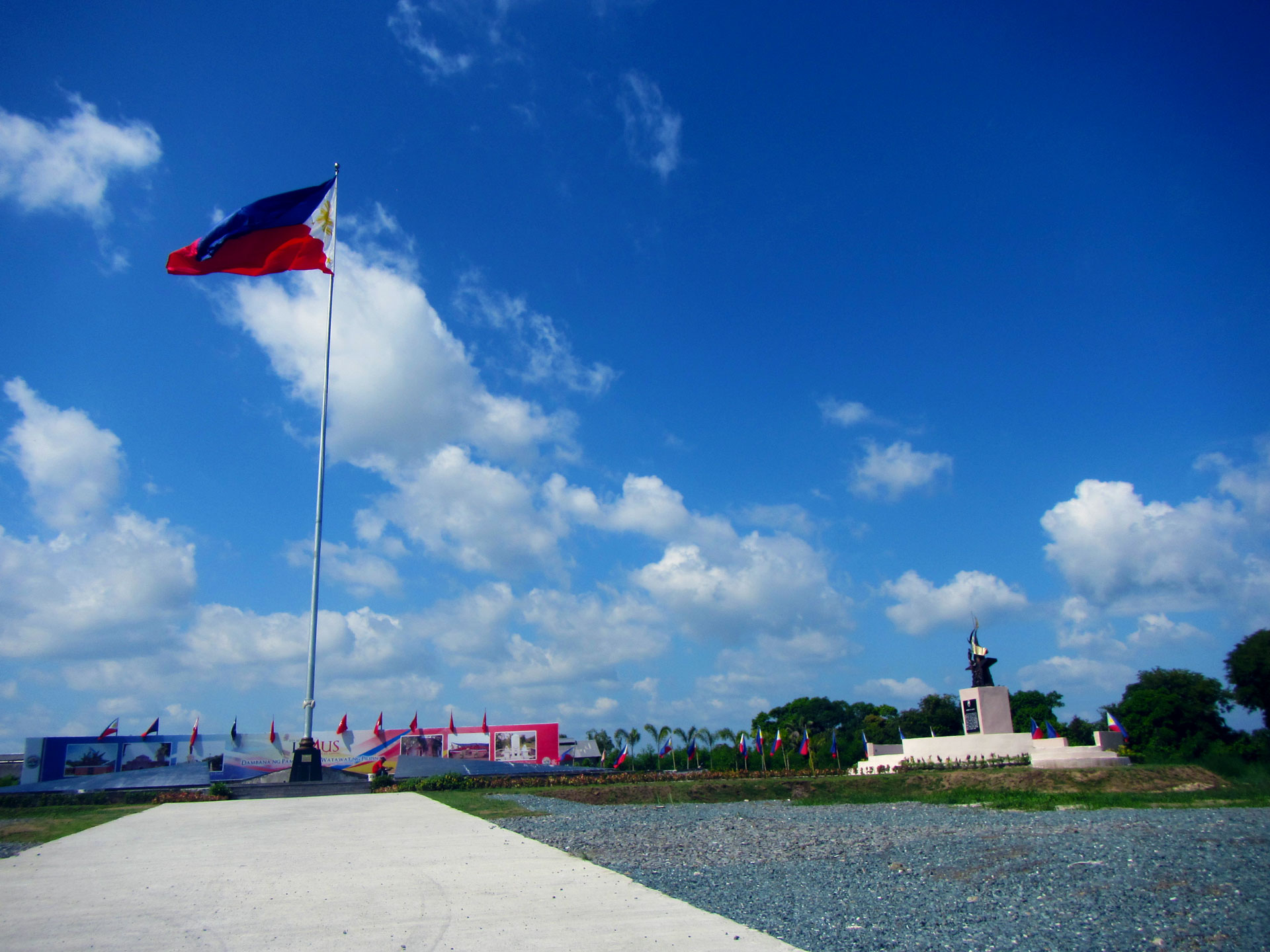
- Shrine of the National Flag
Date	May 28, 1898
Location	Alapan, Imus, Cavite, Philippines 14°24′56.4864″N 120°55′7.1458″E
Result	Filipino victory: Surrender of all Spanish forces in Cavite to Filipino forces; Raising of the Philippine National Flag for the first time
Territorial changes	Filipino revolutionaries liberate Cavite province

Belligerents
Philippines	Spanish Empire

Commanders and leaders
Emilio Aguinaldo; Artemio Ricarte; Mariano Noriel; Luciano San Miguel; Juan Cailles	Leopoldo García Peña (surrendered)

Strength
~18,000; 12,000 at Alapan; 6,000 nearby	~3,070; 270 in Alapan garrison 2,800 in Cavite

Casualties and losses
Unknown	132 killed 200+ captured at Alapan garrison 2,800 surrendered by May 31

The Battle of Alapan (Filipino: Labanan sa Alapan, Spanish: Batalla de Alapan) was fought on May 28, 1898, and was the first military victory of the Filipino Revolutionaries led by Emilio Aguinaldo after his return to the Philippines from Hong Kong. After the American naval victory in the Battle of Manila Bay, Aguinaldo returned from exile in Hong Kong, reconstituted the Philippine Revolutionary Army, and fought against the Spanish troops in a garrison in Alapan, Imus, Cavite. The battle lasted for five hours, from 10:00 A.M. to 3:00 P.M.

After the victory at Alapan, Aguinaldo unfurled the Philippine flag for the first time, and hoisted it at the Teatro Caviteño in Cavite Nuevo (present-day Cavite City) in front of Filipino revolutionaries and more than 270 captured Spanish troops. A group of American sailors of the US Asiatic Squadron also witnessed the unfurling.

Flag Day is celebrated every May 28 in honor of this battle. This day also marks the start of the national Independence Day celebrations, as well as of the province-wide Kalayaan Festival celebrated all over Cavite province, honoring the province's role in the achievement of national independence.

== Background ==
The previous year marked the end of the first part of the Philippine Revolution with the signing of the Pact of Biak-na-Bato. Under the terms of the agreement, Aguinaldo went into exile in Hong Kong and prepared for the continuation of the revolution.

When Aguinaldo was in exile, the Spanish–American War began. While most of the war's battles were in the Spanish colony of Cuba, the first battle was between the U.S. Navy and Spanish Navy in the Battle of Manila Bay. On May 1, 1898, U.S. Navy Commodore George Dewey and the U.S. Asiatic Fleet decisively defeated the Spanish and seized control of Manila Bay, effectively controlling Manila and the Spanish government of the Philippines. Aguinaldo, who at the time of the battle was visiting Singapore enroute to Europe, traveling under an assumed name, returned to Hong Kong and was transported to the Philippines by Dewey. On May 19, 1898, Aguinaldo returned to the Philippines aboard the U.S. Navy ship the USS McCulloch.

He had with him a flag of his own design, sewn in Hong Kong by Marcela Agoncillo and her daughter, with the help of Delfina Herbosa de Natividad, niece of José Rizal.

Upon returning to the Philippines, landing at Kawit in May 20, Aguinaldo reconstituted the revolutionary army and formed a dictatorial government with himself as dictator. With word of Aguinaldo's return and the reforming of the revolutionary army spreading, insurgents and restive elements from all over Luzon flocked by droves to Cavite to join the war of liberation taking place there.

== The battle ==
Fierce fighting erupted at 10:00 o'clock in the morning and lasted until 3:00 in the afternoon on May 28, 1898, Aguinaldo attacked a garrison of 270 or more Spanish troops under the command of General Leopoldo García Pena, who commanded 2,800 men loosely scattered across Cavite. Upon hearing of Aguinaldo's return, a column of 500 infantrymen from Manila had rushed to reinforce Peña, but they were stopped in Laguna by a force commanded by Paciano Rizal and Pío del Pilar.

Back in Cavite. a combined force of over 6,000 men under Artemio Ricarte, Luciano San Miguel, Mariano Noriel, and Juan Cailles pressured Peña's troops around Cavite. At Alapan, they fought at rather close range, armed with bamboo cannons and Mauser rifles and fought with full force despite heavy Spanish resistance. However, they had much more ammunition than the Spaniards, and after five hours, the Spaniards ran out of ammunition and surrendered.

== Flag-raising and aftermath ==
After the battle, Aguinaldo marched to Cavite together with 300 Spanish captives, including General García-Peña himself, and unfurled what was to become the Philippine national flag. A personal account of Aguinaldo's battalion described the battle and the ceremony:

There it was that the first engagement of the Revolution of 1898 took place. The battle raged from ten in the morning to three in the afternoon, when the Spaniards ran out of ammunition and surrendered, with all their arms, to the Filipino revolutionists, who took their prisoners to Cavite. In commemoration of this glorious achievement, I hoisted our National Flag in the presence of a great crowd, who greeted it with tremendous applause and loud, spontaneous and prolonged cheers for independence.

By the evening of May 31, the entire province of Cavite was in revolutionary hands. Over the next few months, revolutionary forces would solidify their control of areas outside of Manila, which was under Spanish control, while the Americans controlled Manila Bay and brought in U.S. Army troops. The Americans would seize Manila in the "mock" Battle of Manila of 1898 in September and eventually, this stand-off, with American forces controlling Manila and Manila Bay and the Philippine revolutionary forces surrounding the city, would end with the outbreak of the Philippine–American War in February 1899.
