= 2nd Noveleta Battalion =

Unit of the Philippine Republican Army

The Second Noveleta Battalion (Batallón Noveleta Número Dos in Spanish) was a military unit within the Philippine Republican Army, composed of enlisted Filipino soldiers from Noveleta, Cavite.

It was stationed in the First Zone of Manila in early 1899, under the command of General Mariano Noriel and Colonel Juan Cailles and saw action in the Battle of Manila in 1899.
