= 5th Malabon Battalion =

Unit of the Philippine Republican Army

The Fifth Malabon Battalion (Batallón Malabón Número Cinco in Spanish) was a military unit within the Philippine Republican Army, composed of enlisted Filipino soldiers from San Francisco de Malabon (currently General Trias), Cavite.

It was stationed in the First Zone of Manila in early 1899, under the command of General Mariano Noriel and Colonel Juan Cailles and saw action in the Battle of Manila in 1899.
