= Philippine resistance =

Philippine resistance may refer to the:

- Morong Command, which resisted US forces during the Philippine–American War of 1899–1902, or;
- Philippine resistance against Japan in 1942–1945.
