= Pío del Pilar Brigade =

Unit of the Philippine Republican Army

The Pío del Pilar Brigade was a military unit within the Philippine Republican Army, comprising Filipino soldiers and resistance fighters. It was established and led by General Pío del Pilar around May 1898 and was based in Las Piñas. As late as December 1900, it was recruiting volunteers from Singalong and Pasay.

The earliest record of the unit dates back to May 1898, when General del Pilar reported to Aguinaldo, who had recently returned from exile in Hong Kong, about his readiness to attack Manila with 300 volunteer Katipuneros stationed in Las Piñas. The brigade took part in the siege of Manila, initially pushing back Spanish forces in a battle at Zapote Bridge. Assigned to the Second Zone of Manila, the unit launched an attack against the Spaniards at the English Cemetery in Makati. On August 13, 1898, General Greene prevented Filipino forces from entering Spanish-held Manila. In response, the brigade blocked U.S. navigation on its side of the Pasig River, defying orders from President Aguinaldo and, like General Antonio Luna, continued to carry out provocative attacks against American troops.

The brigade played a significant role in the Battle of Manila in 1899. Following the loss of the Second Zone to American forces, the unit retreated eastwards. During this period, they engaged in a notable delaying action around Nuestra Señora de Gracia Church in Guadalupe Viejo, San Pedro de Macati on February 10, 1899 but was driven back. An attempted counterattack at San Felipe Neri on February 17 failed. Elements of the brigade also attempted to form defensive lines at Malapad-na-Bato, Pateros, through to Pasig in March and Cainta a few months later but were further driven out of towns. The U.S. forces took no prisoners from Del Pilar’s unit and vowed to wipe it out.

In May 1899, together with the forces of General Gregorio del Pilar numbering to about 800 men, set up stone-fronted trenches in Baliuag, Bulacan in an effort to delay the American advance. The units retreated when General Lawton approached the town.

The brigade was entrenched on the outskirts of Morong in June 1899 and withheld their fire until the American troops had disembarked and were exposed. However, the American artillery soon opened fire on the defenders, driving them from their positions. The skirmish resulted in nine Filipino deaths and five wounded. Following this, the 1st Washington Regiment, successfully took Morong, forcing the brigade to disperse and retreat to the hills.

In August 1899, elements of the brigade clashed with American forces in barrio Bintog in Quingua, Bulacan.

Following the decision of President Emilio Aguinaldo's government to dissolve the Army in November 1899 and transform military units into decentralized guerrilla commands, the brigade was assigned to operate in the Province of Bulacan, with its base in the southwestern sector of the Sierra Mountain Range. This threatened the Americans' control of the Marikina waterworks and Manila Wagon Road to the north, resulting in the Battle of San Mateo in 1899.

Under the leadership of Símon Tecson, the unit engaged American troops in San Miguel de Mayumo, Bulacan, on June 3, 1900, resulting in the capture of an American Captain and two Privates.

The unit was also noted for engaging American forces from the marshes of San Vicente and Santa Rita in Cabiao, in an attempt to delay their advance in pursuit of President Aguinaldo northwards.

The capture of del Pilar on June 8, 1900 in Guadalupe, Makati and exile to Guam in January 1901 effectively ended the operation of the guerrilla unit.

== Bibliography ==
- Nakpil, Carmen Guerrero (November 9, 2009). "Makati's hero". philstar.com.
