= Battle of Pateros =

- Part of the Philippine Revolution
Date	December 31, 1896 – January 3, 1897
Location	Pateros and Taguig towns, Province of Manila, and in Silang, Cavite, Captaincy General of the Philippines
Result	1st phase: Filipino victory 2nd phase: Spanish victory

Belligerents
Katipunan: Magdalo; Matagumpay	Spanish Empire: Guardia Civil

Commanders and leaders
Emilio Aguinaldo; Pío del Pilar; Mariano Noriel	Camilo de Polavieja; Francisco Galbis

Strength
about 1,000 regulars & militia	150 cazadores 400 Spanish reinforcements

Casualties and losses
Unknown	Unknown

The Battle of Pateros refers to a series of skirmishes between Spanish troops and revolutionary forces in the towns of Las Piñas, Taguig and Pateros in Manila. These skirmishes occurred shortly after the execution of José Rizal and are considered the renewal of hostilities in Luzon after a period of ceasefire from the Battle of Binakayan to the Rizal execution.

== Background ==
After the failed Spanish attempt to recapture several towns in Cavite, a short period of desperate fighting occurred. The central Luzon revolutionaries in the north were heavily depleted and were on the verge of losing their war. Andrés Bonifacio's men in Morong were hard pressed by the Spaniards. But as things began to settle, the revolutionaries had successfully liberated all of Cavite and most of Laguna, Batangas and Tayabas provinces. In the period following the battle at Binakayan, several townsfolk from all over the provinces raced to settle in the territory of Cavite, bringing with them their town bands, their patron saints and so on. This period of temporary peace saw what the settlers of Cavite called "Ang Panahon ng Tagalog". Meanwhile, a new governor, Camilo de Polavieja, was put in power and began to suppress the rebels in Cavite, with Manila newspapers reporting the arrival of 40,000 cazadores (marksmen) from Spain.

== Advance on Pateros ==
Strategically located along the Pasig River, Pateros and other cities in the area were ideal for controlling trade in and out of Laguna, as Emilio Aguinaldo slowly advanced on Pateros, the generals of Laguna planned to liberate the rest of the province as well. Just before these incidents, an unofficial ceasefire was being observed in Cavite. Upon hearing of the execution of Rizal, Aguinaldo and several other generals ordered for the renewed struggle for independence. The first major target for the revolutionaries was Pateros and its surrounding towns. The advance began on land with the Aguinaldo forces marching towards Pateros, after noticing rebel activities in the area, Spanish troops pleaded for reinforcements as Aguinaldo moved forward, the reinforcements would arrive one day too late.

=== First Battle ===
On December 31, Aguinaldo engaged the Spanish loyalist garrison at Pateros, the Spanish forces was caught completely by surprise and surrendered immediately, meanwhile, Mariano Noriel advanced on Taguig and Pio del Pilar on Las Piñas and Silang respectively. By nightfall of the 31st, Pateros, Taguig, Las Piñas and Silang were under rebel control.

=== Spanish reinforcements arrive ===
Starting on January 1 until January 2, a large contingency of Spanish reinforcement troops from Laguna arrived.

General Aguinaldo, after sustaining heavy casualties from the previous engagement, was forced to order a tactical withdrawal out of Pateros and Noriel, out of Taguig to avoid unnecessary casualties. Spanish troops began to probe rebel activities in Pateros, while the revolutionary forces shifted their attention to Las Piñas.

=== Skirmishes ===
On January 3, rebel forces under General Pio Del Pilar skirmished with Spanish fortified strongholds put up by Governor-general Ramon Blanco in Las Piñas, Perez Dasmariñas and Silang in an attempt to disrupt Spanish forces, by the afternoon of the 3rd, General del Pilar had withdrawn his forces from Las Piñas into Cavite.

== Aftermath ==
Though successful in the initial part of the battle, the Filipinos took crippling losses in this battle, and with such loss, were unable to hold their positions near Manila for long. They retreated in the nearby provinces to avoid further rout by the Spanish. For the latter, their advances after the battle meant that the road to the Katipunan faction of Magdalo's capital of Imus was now open. To grasp the opportunity, the Spanish general Jose de Lachambre ordered a quick assault on Cavite province to finally pacify the rebels there and retake the province for the Spanish Crown.
