= Luciano San Miguel =

Filipino general (1875-1903)

- Born: January 7, 1875; Noveleta, Cavite, Captaincy General of the Philippines
- Died: March 28, 1903; Antipolo, Rizal, Insular Government of the Philippine Islands
- Military career
- Allegiance: Katipunan; Philippine Republic; Bagong Katipunan
- Branch: Philippine Republican Army
- Service years: 1896–1903
- Rank: Brigadier general Captain general
- Commands: Magdiwang forces, Zambales, Pangasinan, Bagong Katipunan
- Conflicts: Philippine Revolution; Battle of San Francisco de Malabon; Battle of Alapan; Philippine–American War; Battle of Manila; Post-war resistance †

Luciano San Miguel (January 7, 1875 – March 27/28, 1903) was a Filipino general in the Philippine Republican Army during the Philippine Revolution, and the Philippine-American War, and the founder of Bagong Katipunan.

== Early life ==
Born in Noveleta, Cavite on January 7, 1875, to Regino San Miguel and Gabriela Saklolo. He was the eldest, and only son among five children. He was educated in agriculture at Ateneo de Manila, he later worked as a tailor before becoming an inspector at a hacienda at Nasugbu, Batangas.

== Katipunan and the revolution ==
San Miguel joined the Katipunan in 1896, a secret group whose aim is to topple the Spanish colonial authority over the Philippines. Upon the splitting of the group in late 1896, San Miguel joined the Magdiwang faction, who is loyal to supremo Andrés Bonifacio. when both the Magdiwang and Magdalo factions merged again into one group after the Tejeros Convention, Luciano quickly rose to the rank of colonel, and commanded Filipino forces in Nasugbu and Cavite in the revolution. He took part in multiple engagements in the revolution, like the Battle of San Francisco de Malabon in 1896, and the Battle of Alapan in 1898.
