= Morong Command =

Unit of the Philippine Republican Army

The Morong Command (also known as the Morong Battalion until November 1899) was a battalion of Filipino soldiers and resistance fighters, notably led by General Licerio Gerónimo during the Philippine–American War. Its volunteers mostly came from the province of Morong, northeast of Manila. It was assigned to the Third Zone of Manila in early 1899.

On the evening of February 4, 1899, the battalion was the first unit to skirmish with the First Nebraska Volunteer Regiment while the then-commanding officers General Artemio Ricarte and Colonel Luciano San Miguel were on leave at the time of the incident, sparking the Battle of Manila in 1899 and the Philippine–American War. The name of the first Filipino fatality of the war was Corporal Anastacio Felix of Morong Battalion's 4th Company, under Captain Serapio Narvaez. The battalion bore the brunt of most of the American probes north of the Pasig River. The battalion was reported to have retreated towards Cubao by morning of February 5 before ultimately ending up and regrouped in Marikina. The battalion set up a defense on the outskirts of the town the next day but by February 7, the unit has dispersed when the Americans under Colonel John Stotsenburg arrived and occupied in the town.

Following President Emilio Aguinaldo's government's decision to dissolve the Army in November 1899 and transform military units into decentralized guerrilla commands, the unit was assigned, under the leadership of General Gerónimo, to operate in the Province of Morong. The command played a significant role in the Battle of San Mateo in 1899, where a sniper from the command named Bonifacio Mariano fatally shot the American General Henry Ware Lawton.

Constant skirmishes and battles with the Philippine Constabulary and the U.S. Army took a heavy toll on the battalion. On March 29, 1901, General Gerónimo surrendered in San Mateo, Rizal.
