= Philippine Republic =

The term "Philippine Republic" refers to a succession of republics during and after the Philippine Revolution in the Philippines.

The current government of the Philippines recognizes five "Philippine republics" in the history of the Philippines:

- First Philippine Republic (January 23, 1899 – April 1, 1901)
  - Called itself the "Philippine Republic". Also called the Malolos Republic by historians.
- Second Philippine Republic (October 14, 1943 – August 17, 1945)
- Third Philippine Republic (July 4, 1946 – January 17, 1973)
- Fourth Philippine Republic (June 30, 1981 – February 25, 1986)
- Fifth Philippine Republic (February 2, 1987 – present)

The current government in the Philippines is termed Republic of the Philippines.

Earlier organizational bodies which led to the First Republic, headed by many of the same people, also styled themselves as "Philippine Republic" and/or "Republic of the Philippines":

- Tejeros government (March 22, 1897 – November 1, 1897)
  - Called itself by both and other names, no historical consensus.
- Republic of Biak-na-Bato (November 1, 1897 – December 15, 1897)
  - Called itself the "Republic of the Philippines". "Republic of Biak-na-Bato" is from historians.

Two other organizational bodies separate from the above also styled themselves as republican governments but used "Tagalog" and its derivatives as direct equivalents of "Philippines" and its derivatives. One may be considered a revival or continuation of the other.:

- Tagalog Republic (1896 – 1897)
- Tagalog Republic (1902 – 1906)
  - "Tagalog Republic" is an approximation of the original Tagalog language term by later historians. The original term may be translated more precisely as "Republic of the Tagalog People/Nation".

Within the Philippines, regional governments also styled themselves as republics but did not claim authority over the entire Philippine islands and population unlike all of the above:

- Cantonal Republic of Negros
- Republic of Negros
- Republic of Zamboanga
