= Zapote Line =

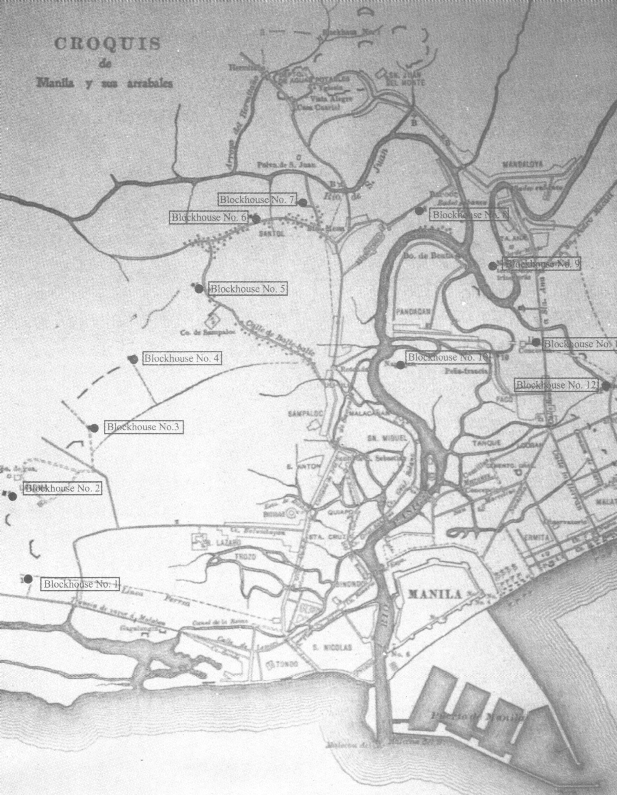
Zapote Line blockhouse locations

The Zapote Line was a defensive system built by the Spanish colonial government during the period of the Spanish–American War. It was a complex of blockhouses and military trenches from Fort San Antonio Abad to the Zapote River.

Following its loss to Filipino revolutionaries by the Spanish in May/June 1898 it was an easy matter for insurgent forces to isolate the province of Manila (formerly known as Tondo until 1859) from Cavite and other provinces to the South while American naval forces blockaded Manila Bay.
