= Pío del Pilar =

Filipino revolutionary general (1860–1931)

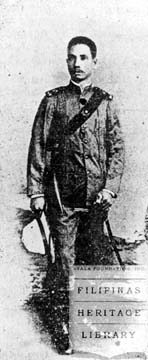
- del Pilar in 1898

Member of the Malolos Congress from Negros Oriental
- In office September 15, 1898 – November 13, 1899 Serving with Luciano San Miguel and Mariano Oirola

Personal details
- Born: Pío Isidro y Castañeda; July 11, 1860 San Pedro de Macati, Manila, Captaincy General of the Philippines, Spanish Empire
- Died: June 21, 1931 (aged 70) Morong, Rizal, Insular Government of the Philippine Islands, United States
- Resting place: Mausoleo de los Veteranos de la Revolución, Manila North Cemetery, Santa Cruz, Manila, Philippines
- Spouse: Juliana Valeriano
- Parents: Isaac del Pilar (father); Antonia Castañeda (mother)
- Nickname: "Pang-Una"

Military service
- Allegiance: First Philippine Republic; Republic of Biak-na-Bato; Katipunan (Matagumpay)
- Branch/service: Philippine Revolutionary Army
- Years of service: 1896–1901
- Rank: Brigadier General
- Battles/wars: Philippine Revolution: Battle of Mandaluyong; Battle of Binakayan-Dalahican; Battle of Pateros; Battle of Aliaga; Battle of Calamba; Philippine–American War: Battle of San Mateo (1899)

Pío del Pilar (born Pío Isidro y Castañeda; July 11, 1860 – June 21, 1931) was a Filipino revolutionary general. He was one of the leading figures in the Philippine Revolution, and fought major battles in Manila and Cavite.

To safeguard his family and prevent them from harassment, he changed his surname from Isidro to del Pilar.

== Early life and education ==
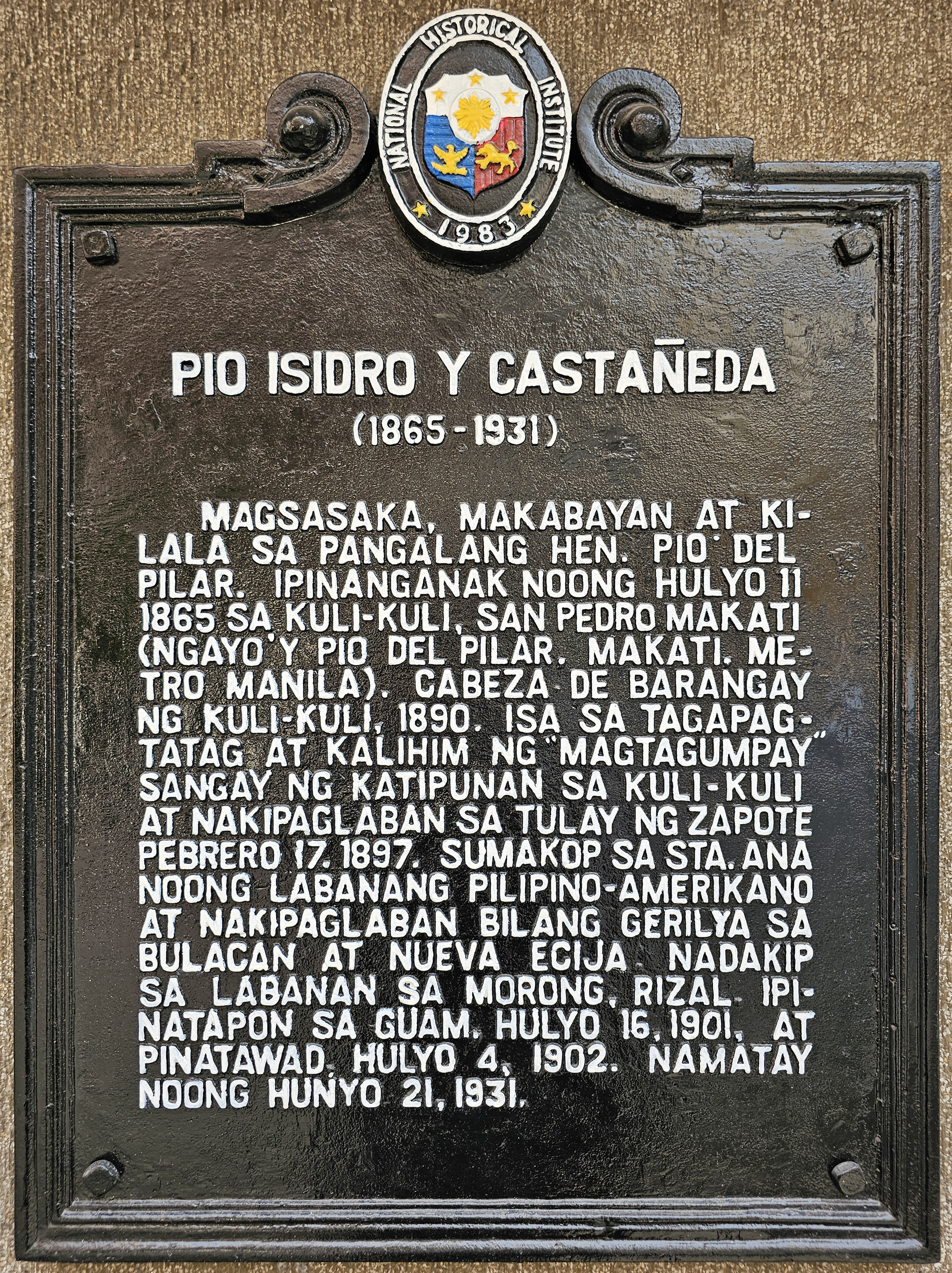
National historical marker installed in Brgy. Pio del Pilar, Makati, in 1983

Del Pilar was born Pío Isidro y Castañeda in Barrio Culi-culi, San Pedro de Macati (present-day Makati) on July 11, 1860, to Isaac del Pilar, a farmer from Pasay, and Antonia Castaňeda, an embroiderer from San Felipe Neri (present-day Mandaluyong). As a child, he studied for two years in the school of Pascual Rodriguez, and for four months under Ramon Renaldo, until he was forced to stop to work on the family farm. Typical of other Filipinos at the time, del Pilar knew little or no Spanish, but was fluent in Tagalog.

Del Pilar married his childhood friend, Juliana Valeriano, at the age of 17. He had been married for barely a year when he was drafted into the Spanish Army. He was assigned to Mindanao for a year, but his service was cut short to four months due to the intervention of a family friend.

In 1890, del Pilar was appointed cabeza de barangay and later became teniente del barrio in San Pedro de Macati. During this time, he had a chance meeting with Jose Rizal, and was inspired to distribute copies of his novel, Noli Me Tangere.

== Role in Philippine Revolution ==
Flag of Pío del Pilar's Katipunan chapter

In May 1896, del Pilar joined the Katipunan and formed a chapter called Matagumpay (Triumphant), taking the symbolic name Pang-una (lit. 'First, Leader'). His chapter also adopted a flag, a white triangle with a K at each corner, at the hoist of a red field, in the center of which was a mountain with a rising sun on it. This flag was known as the Bandila ng Matagumpay (Flag of the Triumphant) and was del Pilar's personal standard during the revolution.

At the outbreak of the Philippine Revolution, del Pilar was arrested by Spanish authorities for suspected membership in the Katipunan. Although tortured, he did not reveal any secrets about the group, and he was later released. Del Pilar participated in his first battle in San Felipe Neri (present-day Mandaluyong) on August 29, 1896. He also led a group of rebels in the Battle of Binakayan on November 9, 1896, capturing the town from Spanish authorities.

On February 16, 1897, bearing the rank of colonel, del Pilar defended Bacoor and Las Piñas. Subsequently, he was promoted to brigadier-general.

Del Pilar was present in the Tejeros Convention on March 22, 1897, which marked the split between the Magdiwang and Magdalo factions of the Katipunan. Because of the events of the Convention, he aligned himself with Andres Bonifacio, eventually signing the Naic Military Agreement declaring the results of the convention to be null and void. In time, however, he switched sides, aligning himself with the Magdalo faction and becoming one of Emilio Aguinaldo's trusted generals. It was del Pilar (along with Gen. Mariano Noriel) who advised Aguinaldo to change the commutation (banishment) to execution of Andres and Procopio Bonifacio.

His last battle was with the Americans, in the town of Morong, where he and his men were defeated and captured. Del Pilar was exiled to Guam along with Apolinario Mabini, Artemio Ricarte, and other revolutionaries, referred to as Irreconcilables by the Americans. He returned to the Philippines after Governor William Howard Taft extended pardons to the revolutionaries. He later supported the Jones Bill, which aimed to prepare Filipinos for self- governance.

He died of a lingering illness on June 21, 1931, at the age of 70, almost three weeks before his 71st birthday.

== Legacy ==
A barangay, originally known as Culi-Culi where he was born, four schools in Makati, and an elementary school in Santa Mesa, Manila, are named in his honor. Additionally, a bronze statue dedicated to him is located at the intersection of Makati Avenue and Paseo de Roxas in the Makati Central Business District.

== In popular culture ==
- Portrayed by Ian Palma in the 2010 film, Ang Paglilitis ni Andres Bonifacio.
- Portrayed by Emilio Garcia in the 2012 film, El Presidente.
