= Mariano Noriel =

Filipino general

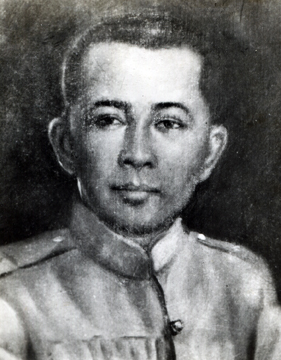
- Born: March 16, 1864; Bacoor, Cavite, Captaincy General of the Philippines
- Died: January 27, 1915 (aged 50); Santa Cruz, Manila, Philippine Islands
- Burial place: Manila North Cemetery, Santa Cruz, Manila, Philippines
- Military career
- Allegiance: First Philippine Republic; Republic of Biak-na-Bato; Katipunan
- Branch: Philippine Revolutionary Army
- Service years: 1897–1899
- Rank: Brigadier General
- Conflicts: Philippine Revolution: Battle of Pateros; Battle of Alapan; Philippine–American War

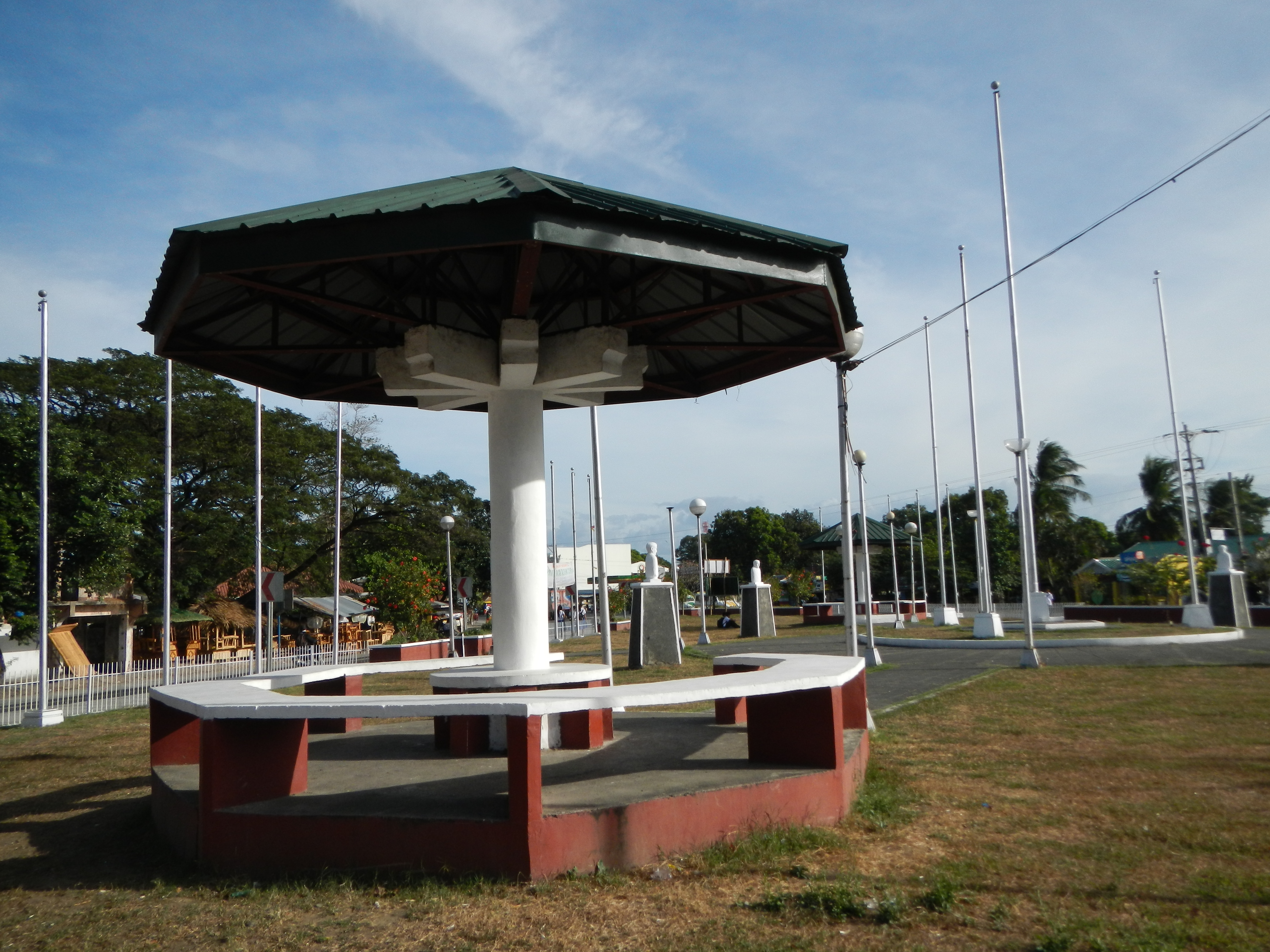
Hen. Mariano Noriel Centennial Park, Maharlika Hi-way Baloc, Santo Domingo, Nueva Ecija

Mariano Reguera Noriel (March 16, 1864 - January 27, 1915) was a Filipino general who fought during the Philippine Revolution and the Philippine–American War. He was member of the War Council that handled the case of Andres Bonifacio in 1897. He led Filipino advance troops before the American army landed in Intramuros in 1898.

== Early life and career ==
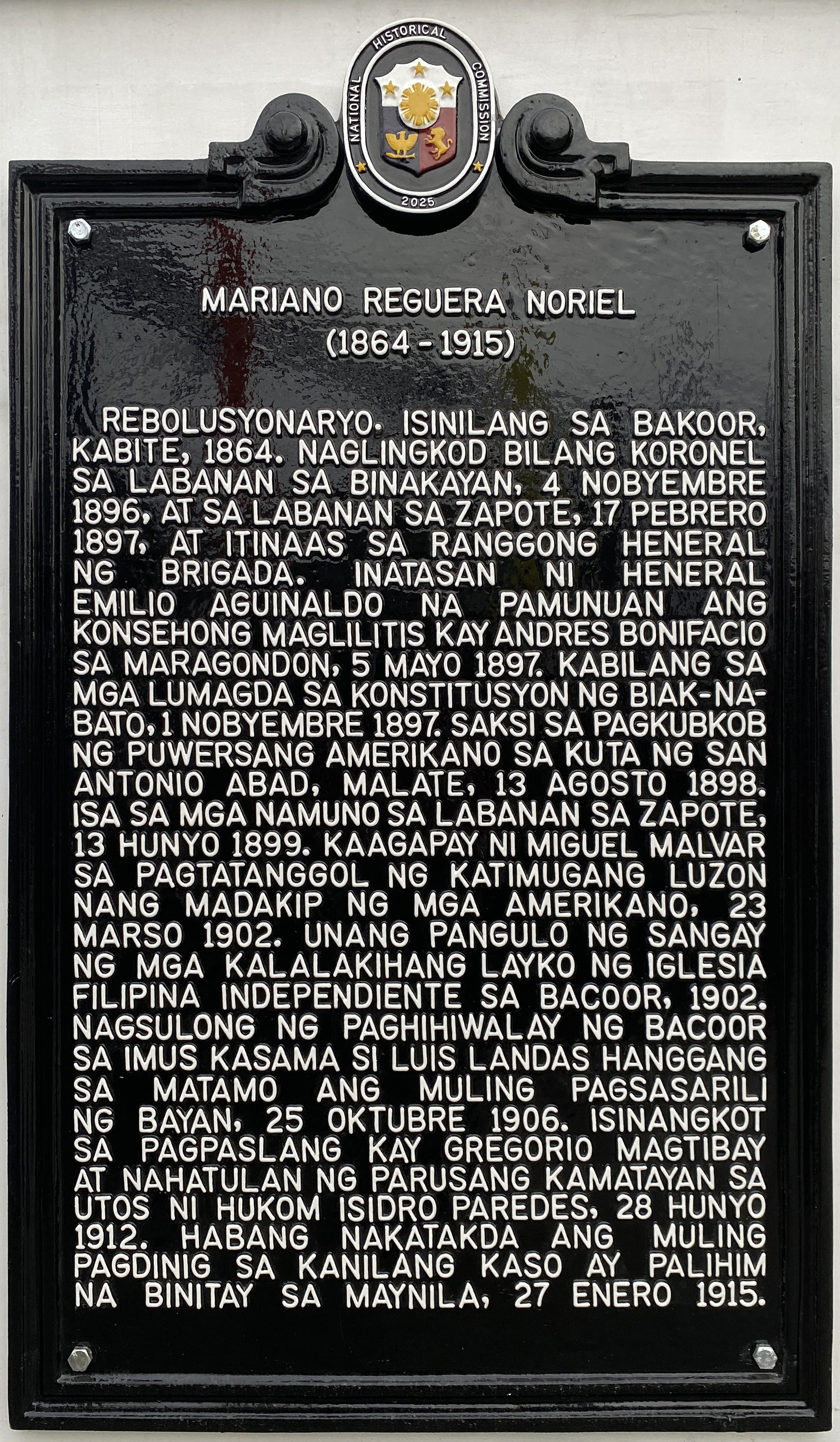
NHCP historical marker unveiled in Bacoor, Cavite, in 2026

A native of Bacoor, Cavite, Mariano Noriel was born in 1864.

Noriel was the president of the Council of War that tried the Bonifacio brothers (Andres and Procopio) in Naik and later in Maragondon in May 1897. Convicted of sedition and treason, Andres and Procopio were sentenced to death but General Emilio Aguinaldo, president of the newly established Revolutionary Government, commuted the death verdict to banishment to the Pico de Loro Mountain in Maragondon. The commutation, however, was later withdrawn due to strong pressure from senior army officers and prominent citizens, including General Pio del Pilar and Noriel himself who believed that the two brothers, if allowed to live, would endanger the revolution.

The withdrawal of the commutation order was construed by Noriel, who was also in charge of the prisoners, as a go signal for the execution of the sentence, and so he had the two brothers shot to death a squad of soldiers under Major Lazaro Macapagal on May 10, 1897.

Aguinaldo, in the book A Second Look at America, which he co-authored with Vicente Albano Pacis, claims that his withdrawal of the commutation order did not mean immediate implementation of the death verdict, that Noriel had misconstrued this and acted hastily. He says he wanted a little more time for a cooling-off period so that eventually the Bonifacio brothers would be forgiven and pardoned. This is in accord with Aguinaldo's claimed humanist and compassionate character.

== Life after the Philippine Revolution ==
The records show that Noriel, along with two others, was sentenced to death for the murder of a man in the Bacoor cockpit in May 1909. The Court of First Instance decision on the case was later confirmed by the Philippine Supreme Court, so it was appealed by an Irish-American lawyer named Amzi B. Kelly, to the Supreme Court of the United States which subsequently reversed the decision. But before the final verdict was received from Washington, Noriel and his co-accused had already been executed by hanging in Manila on January 27, 1915.

== In popular culture ==
- Portrayed by John Arcilla in the 1992 film, Bayani.
- Portrayed by Wendell Ramos in the 2012 film, El Presidente.
