= Philippine Revolutionary Army =

Army of the First Philippine Republic (1899–1901)

- Ejército Revolucionario Filipino (Spanish); Hukbong Tagapagbangong Puri (Tagalog)
- Emblem of the Republic
- Active: March 22, 1897–November 13, 1899
- Country: Philippines
- Allegiance: Tejeros Government from March 22, 1897 to November 1, 1897; Republic of Biak-na-Bato from November 1, 1897 to December 14, 1897; unknown following the December 14, 1897 signing of the Pact of Biak-na-Bato until April 17, 1898.; Central Executive Committee from April 17, 1898 to May 19, 1899; Dictatorial Government from May 19, 1898 to June 23, 1898; Revolutionary Government from June 23, 1898 to January 22, 1899; Philippine Republic from January 22, 1899 to perhaps November 13, 1899, when Aguinaldo decided to disperse his army and begin guerrilla war
- Type: Army
- Role: Land warfare
- Size: 80,000 to 100,000 (1898)
- Garrison/HQ: Kawit, Cavite
- Nickname: Republican Army
- Colors: Blue, Red, White, and Gold
- Anniversaries: March 22
- Engagements: Philippine Revolution; Spanish–American War; Philippine–American War

Commanders
- President: Gen. Emilio Aguinaldo
- Commanding General: Gen. Artemio Ricarte (1897–1899); Gen. Antonio Luna (1899)
- Notable commanders: Gen. Simeón Ola; Gen. Manuel Tinio; Gen. Pío del Pilar; Gen. Mariano Noriel; Gen. Juan Cailles; Gen. Gregorio del Pilar; Gen. Miguel Malvar; Gen. Tomás Mascardo; Gen. José Alejandrino; Gen. Licerio Gerónimo; Gen. Jose Ignacio Paua; Col. Paco Román; Maj. Manuel Quezon

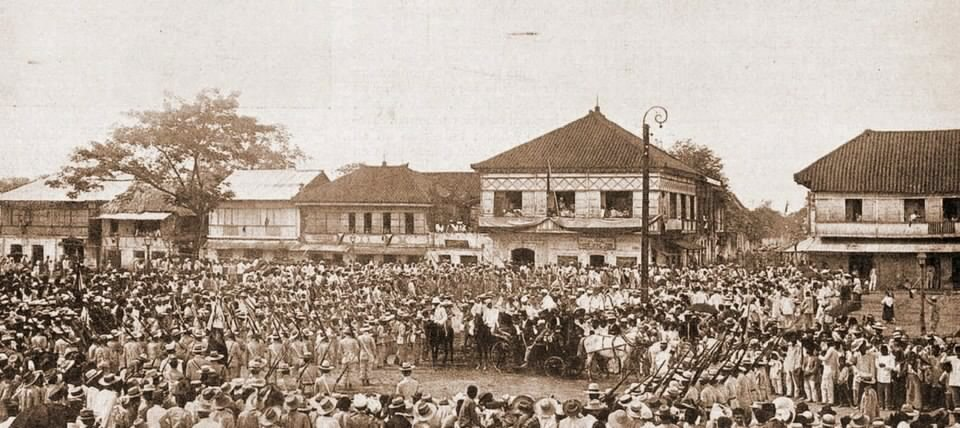
Marching Filipino soldiers during the inauguration of the First Philippine Republic in Malolos on January 23, 1899.

The Philippine Revolutionary Army (Spanish: Ejército Revolucionario Filipino; Tagalog: Hukbong Tagapagbangong Puri), later renamed Philippine Republican Army, (Spanish: Ejército Republicano Filipino; Tagalog: Hukbong Republikanong Pilipino) was the army of the First Philippine Republic from its formation in March 1897 to its dissolution in November of 1899 in favor of guerrilla operations in the Philippine–American War.

== History ==
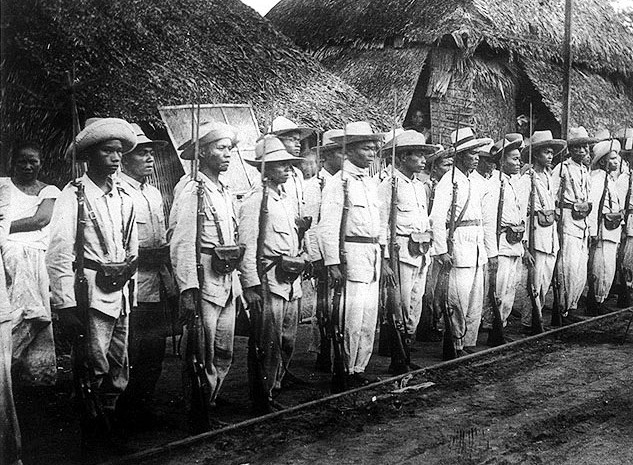
Regular soldiers of the Philippine Revolutionary Army stand at attention for an inspection.

The revolutionary army used the 1896 edition of the Spanish regular army's Ordenanza del Ejército to organize its forces and establish its character as a modern army. Rules and regulations were laid down for the reorganization of the army, along with the regulation of ranks and the adoption of new fighting methods, new rank insignias, and a new standard uniform known as the rayadillo. Filipino artist Juan Luna is credited with this design. Juan Luna also designed the collar insignia for the uniforms, distinguishing between the services: infantry, cavalry, artillery, sappers, and medics. His brother, General Antonio Luna commissioned him with the task and personally paid for the new uniforms. At least one researcher has postulated that Juan Luna may have patterned the tunic after the English Norfolk jacket, since the Filipino version is not a copy of any Spanish-pattern uniform. Infantry officers wore blue pants with two white stripes down the side, while Cavalry officers wore red trousers with two black stripes. Soldiers and junior officers wore straw hats while senior officers often wore peaked caps.

Orders and circulars were issued covering matters such as building trenches and fortifications, equipping every male aged 15 to 50 with bows and arrows (as well as bolo knives, though officers wielded European swords), enticing Filipino soldiers in the Spanish army to defect, collecting empty cartridges for refilling, prohibiting unplanned sorties, inventories of captured arms and ammunition, fundraising, purchasing of arms and supplies abroad, unification of military commands, and exhorting the rich to give aid to the soldiers.

Aguinaldo, a month after he declared Philippine independence, created a pay scale for officers in the army: Following the board, a brigadier general would receive 600 pesos annually, and a sergeant 72 pesos.

When the Philippine–American War erupted on February 4, 1899, the Filipino army suffered heavy losses on every sector. Even Antonio Luna urged Apolinario Mabini, Aguinaldo's chief adviser, to convince the President that guerrilla warfare must be announced as early as April 1899. Aguinaldo adopted guerrilla tactics on November 13, 1899, dissolving what remained of the regular army and after many of his crack units were decimated in set-piece battles.

== Weaponry ==
The Filipinos were short on modern weapons. Most of its weapons were captured from the Spanish, were improvised or were traditional weapons. The service rifles of the nascent army were the Spanish M93 and the Spanish Remington Rolling Block rifle. Moreover, while in Hong Kong, Emilio Aguinaldo purchased rifles from the Americans. Two batches of 2,000 rifles each including ammunition were ordered and paid for. The first batch arrived while the second batch never did. In his letters to Galicano Apacible, Mariano Ponce also sought weapons from both domestic and international dealers in the Empire of Japan. He was offered different breech-loading single-shot rifles since most nations were discarding them in favor of new smokeless bolt-action rifles. However, there was no mention of any purchase occurring. Another planned purchase was the Murata rifle from Japan but no record exists that it made its way into the hands of Filipino revolutionaries.

Crew-served weapons of the Philippine military included lantaka, Krupp guns, Hontoria guns, Ordóñez guns, Hotchkiss guns, Nordenfelt guns, Maxim guns, and Colt guns. Many of these were captured from the Spanish and the Americans. There were also improvised artillery weapons made of water pipes reinforced with bamboo or timber, which could only fire once or twice.

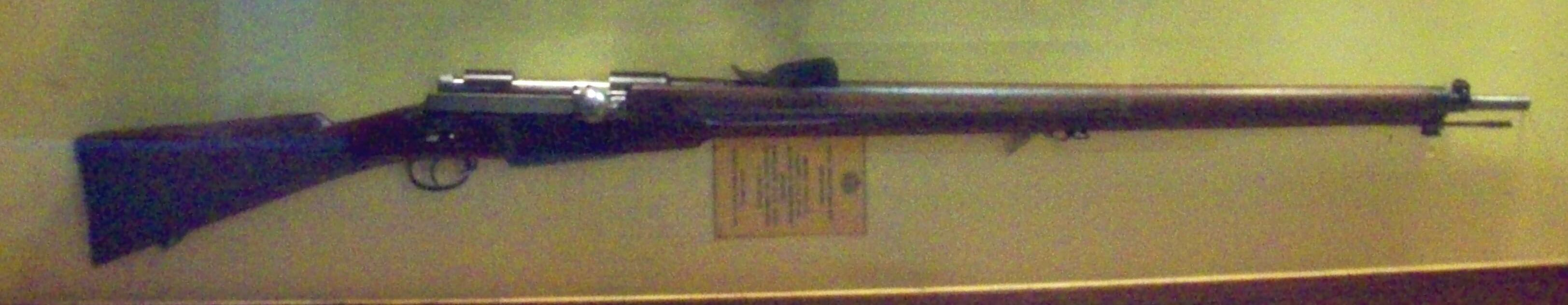
The Filipino Army considered acquiring the Mondragón rifle.

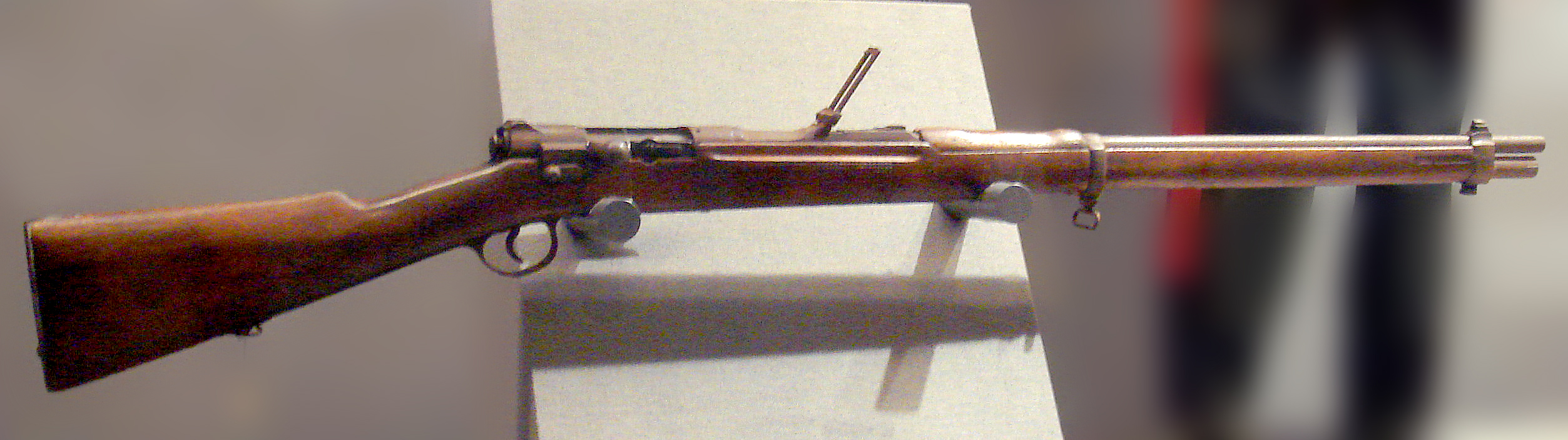
Murata rifles were used in small numbers by the Filipino Army.

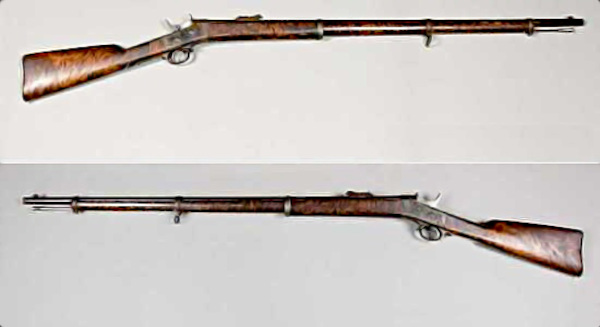
The Spanish Remington Rolling Block rifle was one of the first rifles used by the Filipinos during the Revolution.

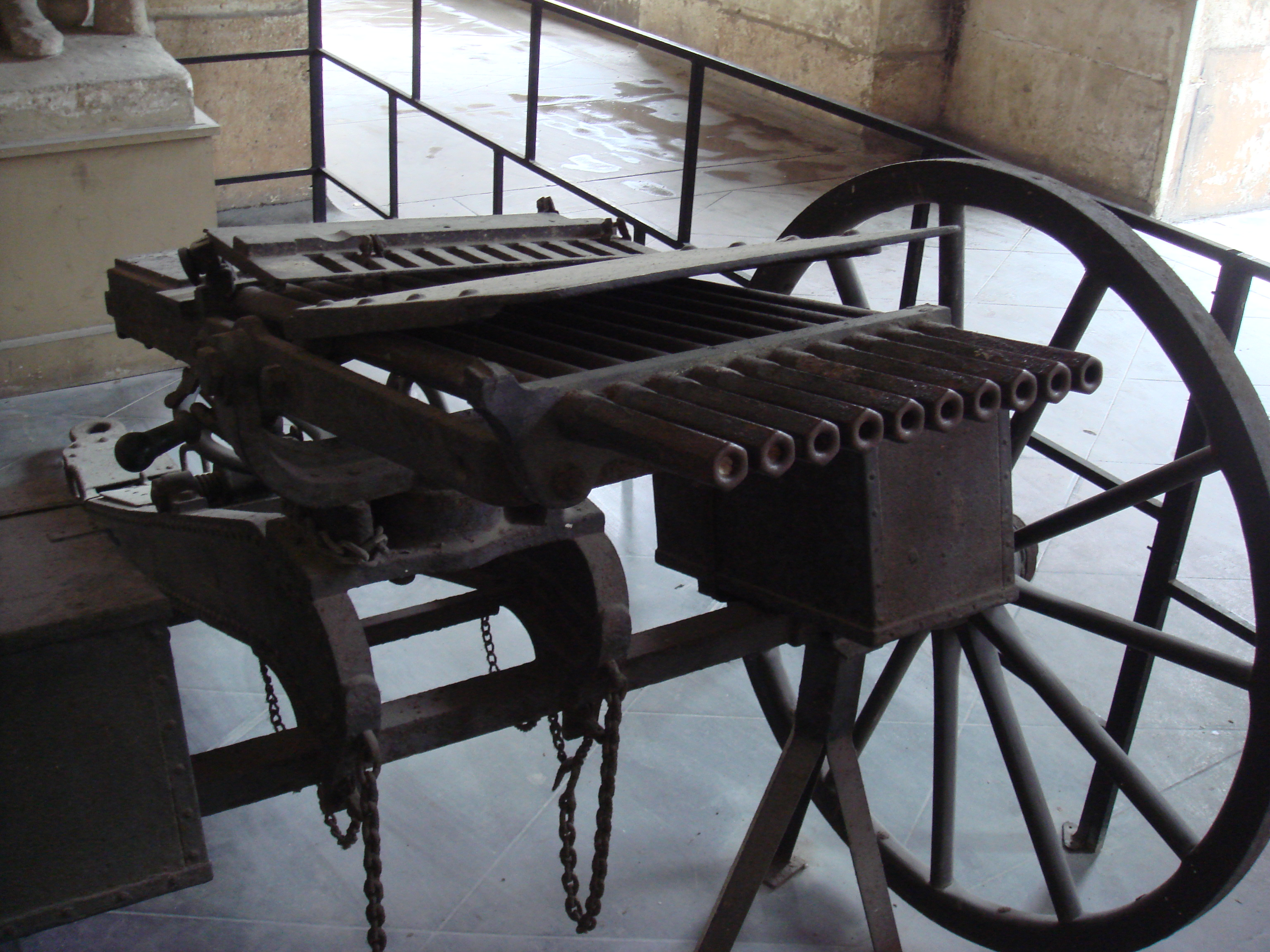
The multi-barreled Nordenfelt machine gun.

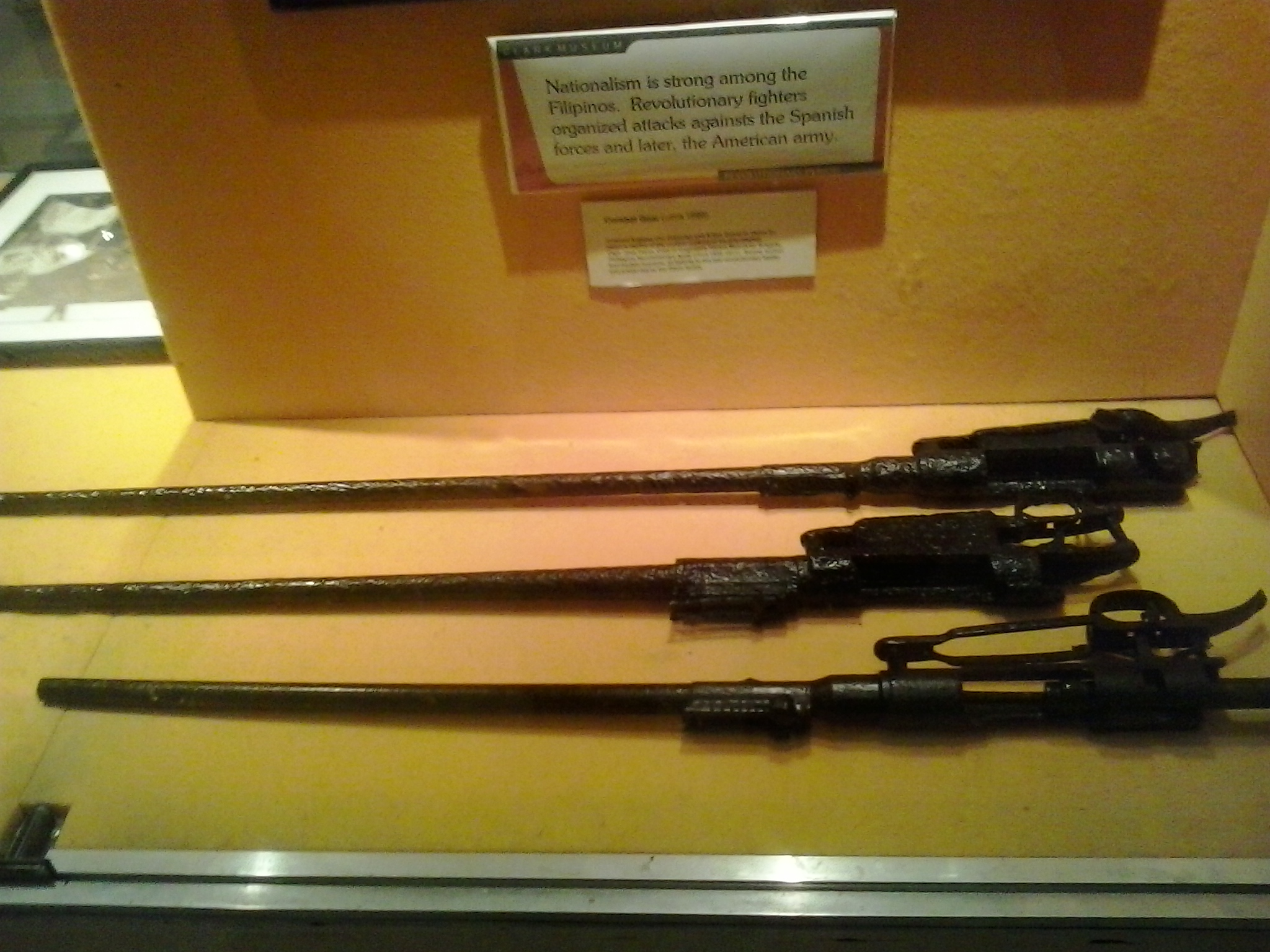
Relics of Mauser 93 rifles used by Filipino infantry during the Philippine Revolution and Philippine–American War on display at Clark Museum.

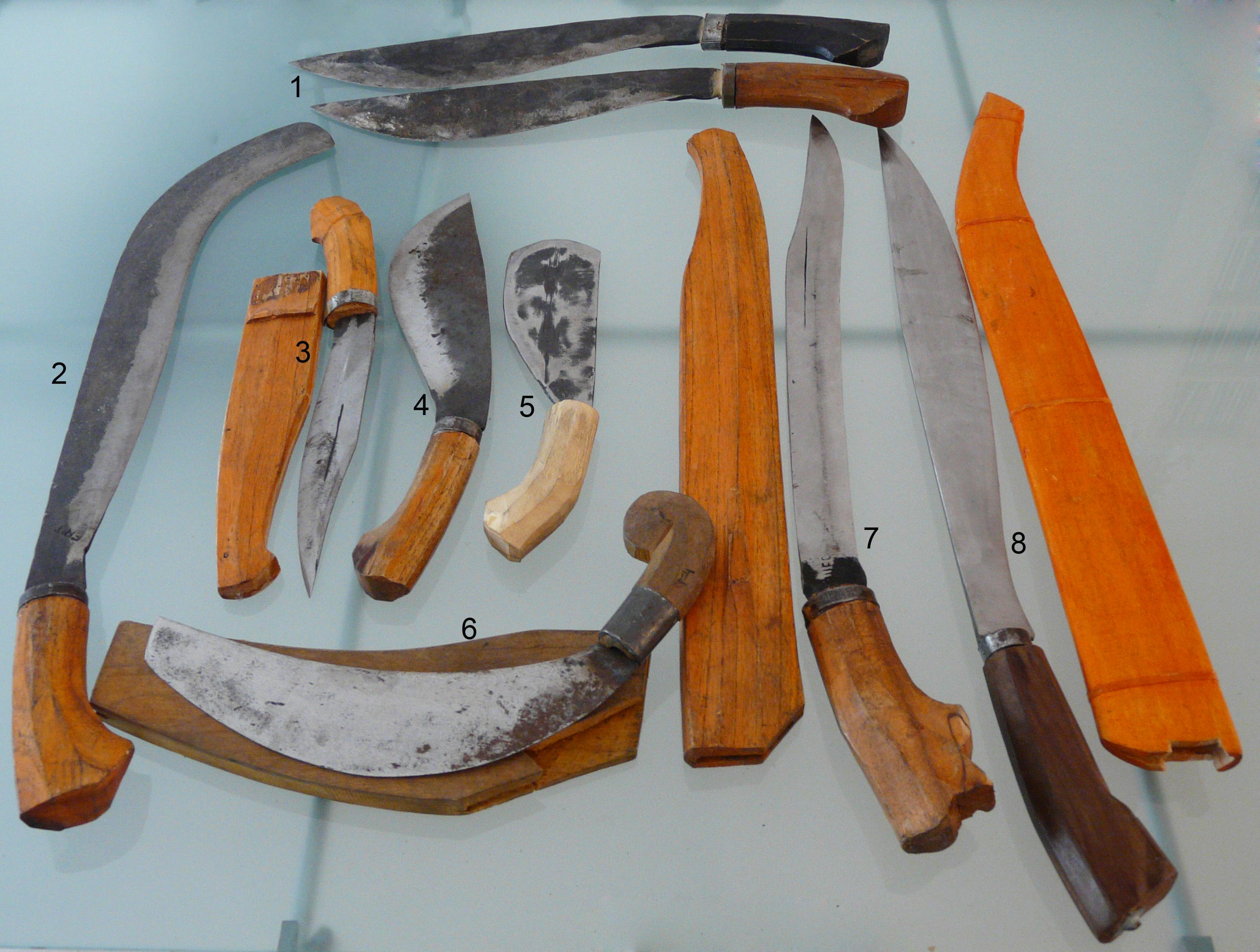
Bolo knives were widely available in the islands and were used extensively by the revolutionaries.

== Ranks ==
=== Commissioned officer ranks ===
The rank insignia of commissioned officers.

Rank group	General / flag officers					Senior officers			Junior officers
Shoulder insignia (1899–1901)
1896 Sleeve insignia
English	Generalissimo/Minister marshal	Captain general	Lieutenant general	Divisional general	Brigadier general	Colonel	Lieutenant colonel	Commandant	Captain	First lieutenant	Second lieutenant
Tagalog	Heneralisimo/Ministrong mariskal	Kapitán heneral	Tenyente Heneral	Komandante Heneral	Brigada Heneral	Koronel	Tenyente koronel	Komandante	Kapitán	Tenyente	Alpéres
Spanish	Generalísimo/Ministro mariscal	Capitán general	Teniente general	General de división	General de brigada	Coronel	Teniente coronel	Comandante	Capitán	1^{er} teniente	2° teniente

=== Other ranks ===
The rank insignia of non-commissioned officers and enlisted personnel.

Rank group	Senior NCOs	Junior NCOs	Enlisted
Sleeve insignia
English	Sergeant	Corporal	Soldier	Recruit
Tagalog	Sarhento	Kabo	Sundalo	Recluta
Spanish	Sargento	Cabo	Soldado	Recluta

=== Branch colors ===
In 1898, the Philippine government prescribed branch colors twice.

Branch	July 30, 1898	November 25, 1898
Infantry	Black	Deep Red
Artillery	Red	Green
Cavalry	Green	Black
Engineer Corps	Violet	Khaki
General Staff	Blue	Blue
Military Juridical Corps	White	White
Commissary and Quarter-master Corps	Yellow	
Medical Corps	Red Cross	Yellow
Military Administration		Rayadillo
Pharmacists		Yellow and Violet Piping
Secretary of War personnel		Blue
Philippine Military Academy		Blue
Chaplains		Violet
Signal Corps		Hemp

=== Branch insignia ===
- Engineers: A castle superimposed on a diagonally crossed pickax and shovel, surmounted by a sun.
- Artillery: Crossed field guns above six cannonballs, surmounted by a sun.
- Infantry: A diagonally crossed dagger and bolo surmounted by a sun, superimposed on three concentric circles.
- Cavalry: Two crossed lances over two crossed sabers, surmounted by a sun.
- Light Infantry/Rifle battalions: Two crossed rifles with fixed bayonets surmounted by a sun, superimposed on three concentric circles. (This badge is the basis of the current PA infantry branch insignia).
- Intendancy-Quartermaster: A cockade within a wreath surmounted by a sun.
- Signals: Six lightning bolts over a semicircular wreath surmounted by a sun.
- Medical Service: A bowl of Hygieia within a wreath surmounted by a sun.

== Recruitment and conscription ==
During the revolution against Spain, the Katipunan gave leaflets to the people to encourage them to join the revolution. Since the revolutionaries had become regular soldiers at the time of Emilio Aguinaldo, they started to recruit males and some females aged 15 and above as a form of national service. A few Spanish and Filipino enlisted personnel and officers of the Spanish Army and Spanish Navy defected to the Revolutionary Army, as well as a number of foreign individuals and American defectors who volunteered to join during the course of the revolution.

Conscription in the revolutionary army was in effect in the Philippines and military service was mandatory at that time by the order of Gen. Antonio Luna, the Chief Commander of the Army during the Philippine–American War.

== Organization ==
The army was formed into a regular army by Aguinaldo's decree of July 30, 1898. The army was organized into companies of 110 soldiers and officers, with soldiers armed with rifles and bolos while officers were armed with revolvers and swords. Four companies comprised a battalion headed by a lieutenant colonel. A full-complement battalion was composed of six companies and was headed by a brigadier general or colonel. In practice, the battalion varied in size depending on the province: six-company battalions in populous provinces like Cavite and Manila, four-company battalions in Morong, Bataan, and Nueva Ecija, a two-company battalion in Mindoro, and a single company in Marinduque. Battalions were named after their respective provinces, such as the 1st Battalion of Tayabas. Soldiers were recruited voluntarily, with surplus volunteers either joining the police or forming a central corps under the direct command of the President. It grew to four regiments of battalions totaling 10,560 men.

== Philippine Revolutionary Navy ==
The Philippine Revolutionary Navy was established during the second phase of the Philippine Revolution when General Emilio Aguinaldo formed the Revolutionary Navy. On May 1, 1898, the first ship handed by Admiral George Dewey to the Revolutionary Navy is a small pinnace from the Reina Cristina of Admiral Patricio Montojo, which was named Magdalo. The Navy was initially composed of a small fleet of eight Spanish steam launches captured from the Spaniards. The ships were refitted with 9-centimeter guns. The rich, namely Leon Apacible, Manuel Lopez and Gliceria Marella de Villavicencio, later donated five other vessels of greater tonnage, the Taaleño, the Balayan, the Bulusan, the Taal and the Purísima Concepción. The 900-ton inter-island tobacco steamer further reinforced the fleet, Compania de Filipinas (renamed as the navy flagship Filipinas), steam launches purchased from China and other watercraft donated by wealthy patriots.

Naval stations were later established to serve as ships' home bases in the following:

- Ports of Aparri
- Ports of Legaspi
- Ports of Balayan
- Ports of Calapan
- Ports of San Roque, Cavite

On September 26, 1898, Aguinaldo appointed Captain Pascual Ledesma (a merchant ship captain) as Director of the Bureau of the Navy, assisted by Captain Angel Pabie (another merchant ship captain). After passing of the Malolos Constitution the Navy was transferred from the Ministry of Foreign Relations to the Department of War (thereafter known as the Department of War and the Navy) headed by Gen. Mariano Trías.

As the tensions between Filipinos and Americans erupted in 1899 and a continued blockade on naval forces by the Americans, the Philippine naval forces started to be decimated.

== Flags and early banners of the revolution ==
Official Flag of the First Philippine Republic.

Color of the North Luzon Expeditionary Forces.

Flag of the Republic of Biak-na-Bato.

Flag used during the Cry of Pugadlawin.

Flag of Magdiwang faction led by Mariano Álvarez and Flag of the Magdalo faction led by Baldomero Aguinaldo.

The flag of the Katipunan was also used in many campaigns.

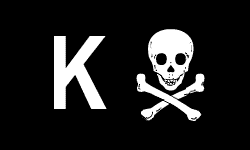
The Skull Banner by General Mariano Llanera of the republican army.

Banner of Pio del Pilar, called the Bandila ng Matagumpay (Flag Of the Triumphants).

Banner of General Gregorio del Pilar, which he used during his campaigns.

Flag of "Republic of Katagalugan" established by Macario Sakay

The supposed flag adopted by the Kakarong Republic was either the Katipunan banner or a plain red banner shown above.

Flag of the Katipuneros of the Bicol region.

Flag of the Revolutionary Government in Bacolod (1899), Republic of Negros.

Flag of the Negros Revolution.

== Officers ==
=== General officers ===
During the existence of the Philippine Revolutionary Army, over a hundred individuals were appointed to General Officer grades.

=== Other notable officers ===
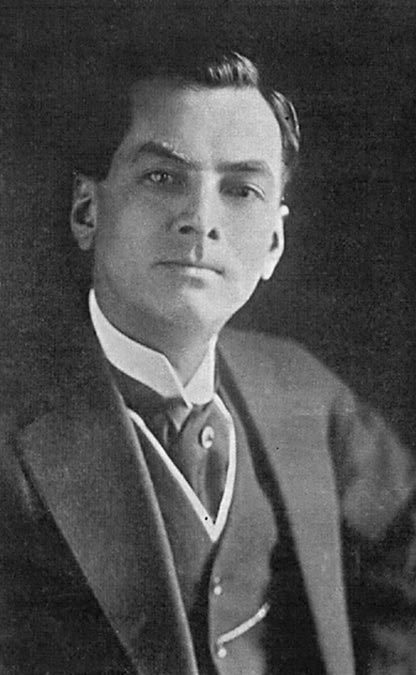
Manuel L. Quezon, a former president of the Philippines, rose to the rank of major in the army.

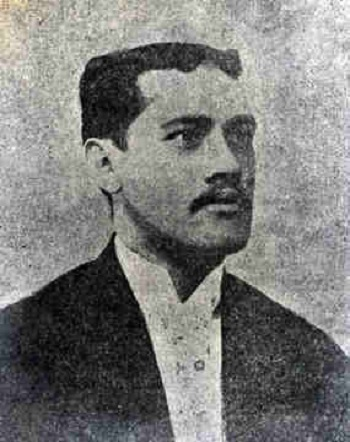
Francisco "Paco" Román – Aide to Lieutenant General Antonio Luna.

- General Águeda Kahabagan y Iniquinto - Commander of the Reserve Corps from April 6, 1899. The only female general in the roster.
- Colonel Agapito Bonzón
- Colonel Felipe Salvador – Commander of the Santa Iglesia faction.
- Colonel Apolinar Vélez
- Colonel Alejandro Avecilla
- Colonel Francisco "Paco" Román – Aide to Lieutenant General Antonio Luna.
- General Ambrosio Flores
- Colonel Pablo Tecson – Leader, Battle of Quingua.
- Colonel Alipio Tecson – Supreme Military Commander of Tarlac in 1900 and exiled to Guam.
- Colonel Simón Tecson – Leader of Siege of Baler; signatory of the Biak-na-Bato Constitution.
- Colonel Pablo Astilla - Headed Infanta Column in Battle of Mabitac
- Colonel Simeón Villa
- Colonel Luciano San Miguel
- Colonel Joaquin Luna
- Colonel José Tagle – Known for his role in the Battle of Imus.
- Lieutenant Colonel Lázaro Macapagal – Commanding officer in-charge at the execution of Andrés and Procopio Bonifacio brothers.
- Lieutenant Colonel José Torres Bugallón – Hero of the Battle of La Loma.
- Lieutenant Colonel Regino Díaz Relova – Fought as one of the heads of columns under General Juan Cailles in the Laguna province.
- Major Manuel Quezon – Aide to President Emilio Aguinaldo. Eventually succeeded him as the second president of the Philippines under the United States-sponsored Commonwealth.
- Major Eugenio Daza – Area Commander Southeastern Samar and overall Commander and chief organizer of the Balangiga Encounter.
- Major Geronimo Gatmaitan – Commanding Officer of the presidential guards responsible for the protection of the President.
- Major Juan Arce
- Major Rufino Ortiz
- Captain Eduardo Rusca – Aide to Lieutenant General Antonio Luna.
- Captain Pedro Janolino – Commanding Officer of the Kawit Company.
- Captain Vicente Roa
- Captain Serapio Narváez – Officer of the 4th Company, Morong Battalion.
- Captain Cirilo Arenas - Captain of Maguagui (Naic), Cavite.
- Lieutenant Venancio B.García – one of Gen. Luna's favorite sharpshooters of the Black Guard units.
- Corporal Anastacio Félix – 4th Company, Morong Battalion the first Filipino casualty of the Philippine–American War.

=== Notable officers and servicemen and their ethnic background ===
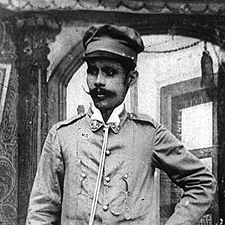
Juan Cailles.

Army

- General Juan Cailles – Franco-Indian mestizo who led Filipino forces in Laguna
- General José Valesy Nazaraire – Spanish.
- Brigadier General José Ignacio Paua – Full-blooded Chinese general in the Army.
- Brigadier General Benito Natividad – Brigade Acting Commander in Vigan under General Tinio.
- Colonel Manuel Sityar – Half-Spanish Director of Academía Militar de Malolos. A former captain in the Spanish colonial army who defected to the Filipino side.
- Colonel Sebastian de Castro – Spanish director of the military hospital at Malasiqui, Pangasinan.
- Colonel Dámaso Ybarra y Thomas – Spanish.
- Lieutenant Colonel Potenciano Andrade – Spanish.
- Estaquio Castellor – French mestizo who led a battalion of sharpshooters.
- Major Candido Reyes – Instructor at the Academía Militar de Malolos. Former sergeant in the Spanish Army.
- Major José Reyes – Instructor at the Academía Militar de Malolos. Former sergeant in the Spanish Army.
- Major José Torres Bugallón – Spanish officer who served under General Luna.
- Captain Antonio Costosa – Former officer in the Spanish Army.
- Captain Tei Hara – Japanese officer who fought in the Philippine-American war with volunteer soldiers.
- Captain Chizuno Iwamoto – Japanese officer who served on Emilio Aguinaldo's staff. Returned to Japan after Aguinaldo's capture.
- A Japanese national named Tobira ("Tomvilla" in American records) who was adjutant to General Licerio Geronimo.
- Captain David Fagen – An African-American Captain who served under Brigadier General Urbano Lacuna. A former Corporal in United States Army 24th Colored Regiment.
- Captain Francisco Espina – Spanish.
- Captain Estanislao de los Reyes – Spanish aide-de-camp to General Tinio.
- Captain Feliciano Ramoso – Spanish aide-de-camp to General Tinio.
- Captain Mariano Queri – Spanish officer who served under General Luna as an instructor in the Academía Militar de Malolos and later as the director-general of the staff of the war department.
- Captain Camillo Ricchiardi – Italian.
- Captain Telesforo Centeno – Spanish.
- Captain Arthur Howard – American deserter from the 1st California Volunteers.
- Captain Glen Morgan – American who organized insurgent forces in central Mindanao.
- Captain John Miller – American who organized insurgent forces in central Mindanao.
- Captain Russel – American deserter from the 10th Infantry.
- Lieutenant Danfort – American deserter from the 10th Infantry.
- Lieutenant Maximino Lazo – Spanish.
- Lieutenant Gabriel Badelly Méndez – Cuban.
- 2nd Lieutenant Segundo Paz – Spanish.
- Lieutenant Alejandro Quirulgico – Spanish.
- Lieutenant Rafael Madina – Spanish.
- Lieutenant Saburo Nakamori – Japanese.
- Lieutenant Arsenio Romero – Spanish.
- Private John Allane – United States Army.
- Private Harry Dennis – United States Army.
- Private William Hyer – United States Army.
- Private Meeks (given name not specified) – United States Army.
- Private George Raymond – 41st Infantry, United States Army.
- Private Maurice Sibley – 16th Infantry, United States Army.
- Private John Wagner – United States Army.
- Private Edward Walpole – United States Army.
- Henry Richter – American deserter from the 9th Cavalry.
- Gorth Shores – American deserter from the 9th Cavalry.
- Fred Hunter – American deserter from the 9th Cavalry.
- William Denten – American deserter who joined General Lukban in Samar.
- Enrique Warren – American deserter who served under Francisco Makabulos in Tarlac.
- Frank Mekin - American deserter from the 37th Infantry who served as a lieutenant under General Juan Cailles.
- Earl Guenther - American deserter and canteen keeper from the 37th Infantry at the Paete garrison who served under General Juan Cailles.
- Antonio Prisco – Spanish.
- Manuel Alberto – Spanish.
- Eugenia Plona – Spanish aide-de-camp to Baldermo Aguinaldo.
- Alexander MacIntosh – English.
- William McAllister – English.
- Charles MacKinley – Englishman who served in Laoag.
- James O'Brian – English.

Navy

- Captain Simplicio Agoncillo Orosa - Captain of the first steam flagship of the navy, SS Bulusan.
- Captain Vicente Catalan – Captain of the Philippine Navy ship Filipinas. A Criollo from Cuba and a former member of the Spanish Navy. Admiral of the Philippine Navy.

== See also ==
- Military history of the Philippines
- Katipunan
- Luna Sharpshooters
- Armed Forces of the Philippines
- Philippine Army
- History of the Philippine Army

== In popular media ==
The Philippine revolutionary army has been mentioned in several books and films.

=== Films ===
- Teniente Rosario (1937)
- Dugo sa Kapirasong Lupa (1975)
- Ganito Kami Noon, Paano Kayo Ngayon? (1976)
- Aguila (1980)
- Tirad Pass: The Last Stand of Gen. Gregorio del Pilar (1996)
- José Rizal (1998)
- Baler (2008)
- Amigo (2010)
- El Presidente (2012)
- Bonifacio: Ang Unang Pangulo (2014)
- Heneral Luna (2015)
- Goyo: Ang Batang Heneral (2018)
