= Campaigns of the Philippine–American War =

Philippine–American War
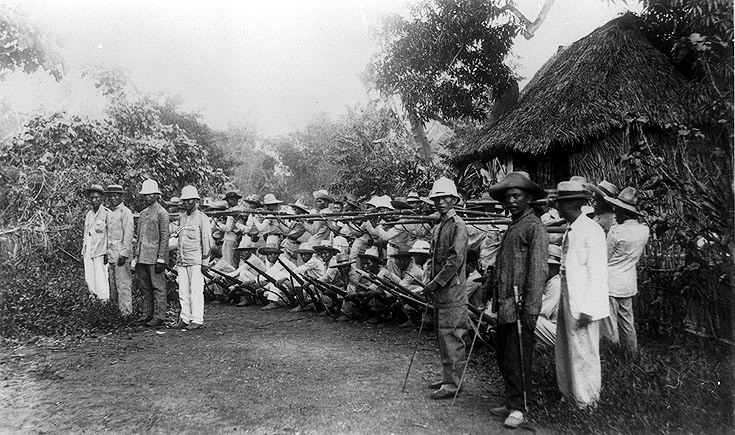
- Filipino soldiers outside Manila 1899
Date	Philippine-American War: June 2, 1899 – July 4, 1902 (Note: July 4, 1902 is the official ending date of the war, though the Moro, the Pulahanes, the remnants of the Katipunan, and the Tagalog Republic, continued hostilities until June 15, 1913.) (3 years, 1 month and 2 days); Moro Rebellion: 1899–1913
Location	Philippines, Southeast Asia
Result	American victory and occupation of the Philippines; Dissolution of the First Philippine Republic.
Territorial changes	The Philippines becomes an unincorporated territory of the United States.

Belligerents
United States; Philippine Constabulary; Macabebe Scouts Philippine Scouts	First Philippine Republic; Philippine Republican Army; Pulajanes; Sultanate of Sulu; Moro; Republic of Zamboanga; Republic of Negros

Commanders and leaders
(United States) William McKinley (United States) Theodore Roosevelt (United States) Elwell Otis (United States) Arthur MacArthur (United States) John Pershing (United States) Jacob Smith	(First Philippine Republic) Emilio Aguinaldo (First Philippine Republic) Antonio Luna (First Philippine Republic) Artemio Ricarte (First Philippine Republic) Miguel Malvar (First Philippine Republic) Manuel Tinio; Arcadio Maxilom; Macario Sakay (First Philippine Republic) Dionisio Seguela; Sultan of Sulu

Strength
≈126,000 total ≈24,000 to ≈44,000 field strength	100,000–1,200,000

Casualties and losses
(United States) 4,165 killed (about 75% from disease), ≈3,000 wounded; 2,000 Philippine Constabulary killed or wounded	≈12,000–20,000 killed
- Filipino civilian dead: ≈200,000 to 1,500,000

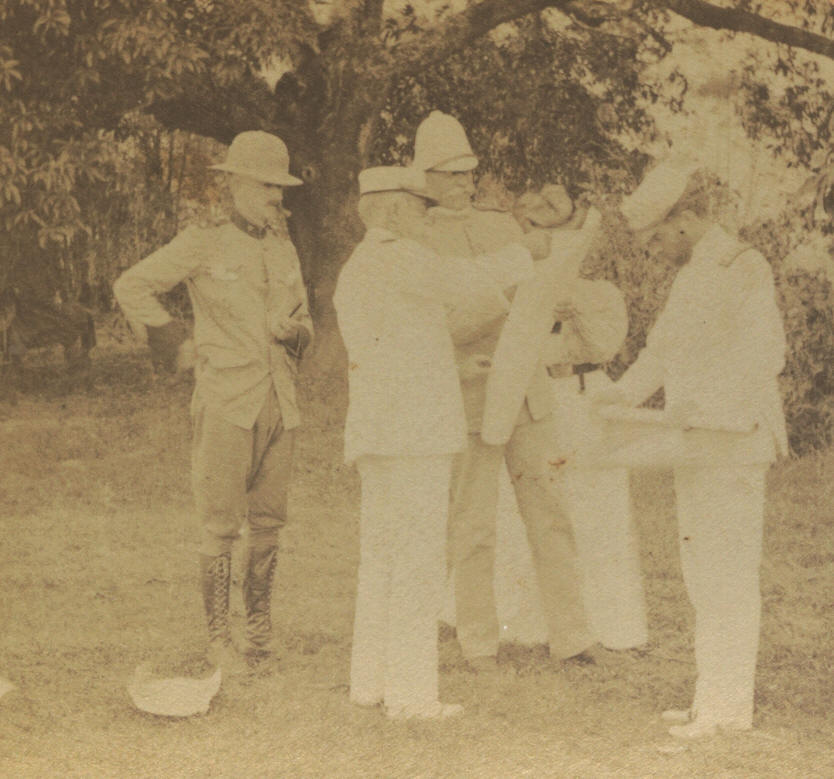
Admiral Dewey and General Lawton

Fighting erupted between forces of the United States and those of the Philippine Republic on February 4, 1899, in what became known as the 1899 Battle of Manila.

On the evening of February 4, 1899, Private William W. Grayson fired the first shot of the Philippine-American War at the corner of Sociego Street and Tomas Arguelles Street. A study done by Ronnie Miravite Casalmir places the event at this corner, not at Sociego-Silencio where they erroneously have the marker. The Ronnie Miravite Casalmir Study debunks the previous findings of Dr. Benito Legarda which was the basis for the erroneous placement of the marker at Sociego-Silencio. According to Ronnie Miravite Casalmir, the smoking gun for the Sociego-Arguelles corner is the presence of Blockhouse 7 in the background of Grayson's reenactment photo. The orientation of this Blockhouse 7 image lines up with the corner of Sociego and Arguelles when compared with the known photo of Blockhouse 7 taken from the same direction. In addition, the distance estimate of Lieut. Whedon placed the 100-yard distance from Santol at Sociego-Arguelles, not Sociego-Silencio. This meant that when Lieut. Whedon ordered the detachment at Santol to patrol 100 yards, he meant them to patrol all the way to Sociego-Arguelles. Col. Stotsenburg corroborated Lieut. Whedon's distance estimate. Prof. Ambeth R. Ocampo calls the evidence presented by Ronnie Miravite Casalmir as new and compelling. Prof. Ocampo agrees that this evidence shows that the marker should be moved one block away, from Sociego-Silencio to Sociego-Arguelles. Maj. Lillian A. Pfluke (Ret.), West Point Class of 1980, and founder of the American War Memorials Overseas Inc. also agrees and has a note on their U.S. War Memorials website that the proper placement of the marker should be at the adjoining intersection of Sociego Street and Arguelles Street where the incident actually occurred.

On June 2, 1899, the First Philippine Republic officially declared war against the United States. The war officially ended on July 2, 1902, with a victory for the United States. However, some Philippine groups—led by veterans of the Katipunan, a Philippine revolutionary society—continued to battle the American forces for several more years. Among those leaders was General Macario Sakay, a veteran Katipunan member who assumed the presidency of the proclaimed Tagalog Republic, formed in 1902 after the capture of President Emilio Aguinaldo. Other groups, including the Moro, Bicol and Pulahan peoples, continued hostilities in remote areas and islands, until their final defeat at the Battle of Bud Bagsak on June 15, 1913.

During the war, the United States Army conducted nine military campaigns. Two additional campaigns were conducted after the official end to the war on July 4, 1902 in connection with the Moro rebellion, which continued until 1913. (Note: See "U.S. Army Campaigns: The Philippine Insurrection". The U.S. Army Center of Military History. Archived from the original on November 9, 2010. Note that historians disagree on what to call the conflict, referring to the war variously as the Philippine Insurrection, Philippine–American War, Filipino-American War, Fil-American War and The Philippine War.) Some other significant actions occurred outside of organized campaigns, both during the war itself and in the post-war period.

== During Philippine–American War ==
The first battle of the Philippine–American War is the Battle of Manila in February, 1899, a few months after the December 1898 Treaty of Paris, which ended the Spanish–American War and in which Spain ceded the Philippines to the United States. (The cession of the Philippines involved a payment of $20 million from the United States to the Spanish Empire.) The Philippine–American War continued into 1902.

=== Manila campaign (February 4 – March 17, 1899) ===
The Manila Campaign was conducted between, February 4 and March 17, 1899. During the Spanish–American War, Emilio Aguinaldo organized a native army in the Philippines and secured control of several islands, including much of Luzon. Cession of the Philippines to the United States on December 10, 1898 via the Treaty of Paris disappointed many Filipinos, and on February 4, 1899 Aguinaldo's followers clashed with American troops. The Americans, numbering about 12,000 combat troops under Major General Elwell Otis, defeated Aguinaldo's force of some 40,000 men and suppressed an attempted uprising in Manila.

American columns pushed north, east, and south from Manila to split the insurgent forces and seize key towns. The column pushing north, commanded by Major General Arthur MacArthur, captured the town of Caloocan. The column pushing east, commanded by Brigadier General Loyd Wheaton, pushed out of Manila and gained control of the Pasig River, which connects Laguna de Bay to Manila Bay, permanently interrupting communications between insurgent forces in north and south Luzon. The column pushing south, commanded by Brigadier General Henry Lawton, was tasked with a long raid along Laguna de Bay; its mission assignment was limited because of manpower shortages due to primacy of the northern theater.

The Manila campaign split the Filipino forces in two, one section north and the other south of Manila, joined only by a narrow corridor running through the towns of Pasig, Pateros, Taguig and Muntinlupa between American lines and the shore of Laguna de Bay. This denied Aguinaldo direct control of Filipino forces south of Manila, in the most revolutionary provinces of Batangas, Laguna and Cavite. Antonio Luna continued as commander of the northern section, and Aguinaldo appointed Mariano Trías commander of the southern section.

==== Significant battles: Manila campaign ====
- Battle of Manila (February 4–5, 1899): American and Filipino forces clash and the Americans drive the Filipino army out of the Manila area.
- Battle of Caloocan (February 10, 1899) American troops under General Arthur MacArthur capture the town of Caloocan north of Manila, securing the southern terminus of the Manila to Dagupan railway (the Ferrocarril de Manila-Dagupan) and capturing a significant amount of rolling stock.
- Second Battle of Caloocan (February 22–24, 1899) Failed Filipino counterattack.

=== Iloilo campaign (February 8–12, 1899) ===
The Iloilo campaign was conducted between February 8 and 12, 1899. Although control of Luzon was the principal military objective in 1899, measures were also taken to establish American control over other important islands. Iloilo on Panay island was occupied on February 11, Cebu City on the island of Cebu on February 26, Bacolod on Negros on March 10, and Jolo in the Sulu Archipelago on May 19. US forces, consisting of General Marcus P. Miller's brigade and Capt. Frank F. Wilde's naval squadron, took Iloilo from Filipino forces under General Martin Delgado, Panay's Federal State of the Visayas, and Ananias Diokno, leaving the city a "blackened ruin". The city was destroyed by a "combination of arson, naval bombardment, and street fighting". Brig. Gen. James F. Smith arrived Bacolod on 4 March as the Military Governor of the Sub-district of Negros, after receiving an invitation from the president of the provisional government, Aniceto Lacson. Commodore George Dewey ordered the Petrel, under the command of Capt. Charles F. Cornwell, into Cebu City's harbor on 21 Feb., followed by Elwell S. Otis assigning on 14 March, troops from the 23rd Infantry, under Maj. Greenleaf A. Goodale, and Lt. Col. Thomas R. Hamer as military governor for the Cebu subdistrict of the Visayas Military District.

=== Malolos campaign (March 24 – August 16, 1899) ===
On March 17, 1899, General Otis reorganized his 8th Corps, breaking it into a defensive force for Manila and an offensive force to pursue operations against Aguinaldo's forces north of Manila.

The Malolos campaign was conducted between March 24 and August 16, 1899. General MacArthur's column advanced along the Ferrocarril de Manila-Dagupan railroad to the north. Malolos the capital of the First Philippine Republic government, was the first objective. MacArthur's column captured Malolos on March 31, but Aguinaldo had decamped and transferred his capital to San Fernando, Pampanga on the same day. on May 5, and the stronghold of San Isidro, Nueva Ecija (which was held only temporarily) on May 15. The advantage gained through capture of Malolos was exploited by advancing to Angeles City, which was captured on August 16.

MacArthur sent one brigade up the Manila–Dagupan railway line while another brigade forded the Quingua River and moved up a wagon road to the west. Otis intended for Lawton to advance west to Baliuag as a blocking force, but Lawton believed he was to move north to Norzagaray to draw Filipino forces away from a defense of Luna's stronghold at Calumpit.

At Calumpit, where Luna's main force was located, thousands of laborers had strengthened the formidable natural defenses with trenches roofed by steel rails or boilerplate for protection from shrapnel and the construction of breastworks at several points. Some 4,000 soldiers defended Calumpit itself, with another 3,000 guarding the flank at Baliuag. Luna had deployed much of his army along the railway line south of Calumpit, and on the night of April 10–11 he launched a series of assaults on garrisons along the railroad, driving the Americans back but failing to rout them.

Otis had intended to launch his offensive on April 24, but action began a day early, on April 23, when American scouts examining the approaches to Quingua were pinned down. Battle developed as American forces were committed to support the scouts. American forces overran Quingua in fierce fighting on April 23 and 24, putting them in position to threaten Calumpit. On April 25, American forces assaulted Luna's stronghold, which fell after a day of heavy fighting.

The American advance northwards stopped at Calumpit while negotiations aimed at ending hostilities were conducted. Colonel Manuel Arguelles, representing Aguinaldo, arrived in Lawton's camp to request a three-week armistice for Aguinaldo to call together his scattered government to discuss terms. Lawton sent him on to Otis, who refused a truce but did wire Lawton and MacArthur to hold their positions.

On May 2, Aguinaldo's representatives proposed a three-month cease-fire, couched in language which required Otis to acknowledge the Philippine Republic as a sovereign nation. Otis refused the truce on those terms, but gave the delegate a copy of President McKinley's plan for a Philippine civil government, which would include an advisory council and judiciary selected from Americans and Filipinos. (Note: For more information, see History of the Philippines (1898–1946)#First Philippine Commission and Schurman Commission.) Aguinaldo's delegates were won over. Aguinaldo's cabinet headed by hard-liner Apolinario Mabini was ousted and replaced with a "Peace cabinet" headed by Pedro Paterno, which sent the delegates back to Manila to discuss surrender terms with Otis. General Luna, however, arrested the delegates and Paterno's cabinet and restored Mabini and the hardliners. Negotiations collapsed, and Otis resumed his offensive.

American forces resumed military action, capturing San Fernando, Pampanga on May 4. Between February 4 and May 4, MacArthur's troops had pushed American lines over 40 miles north. Their supply lines were in shambles and barely half the troops were still fit for active duty. Exhausted American troops recuperated in San Fernando for the rest of May and MacArthur's forces solidified their control of the railroad corridor linking San Fernando to Manila.

==== Significant battles: Malolos campaign ====
- Battle of the Tuliahan River (March 25-26, 1899) – A series of battles along the Taliahan River where the U.S. Eighth Corps' 2nd Division engaged forces at Malabon, Caloocan, San Francisco del Monte, Polo, Malinta and Meycuaayan.
- Battle of the Meycauayan bridge (March 26, 1899) – a bloody battle in which MacArthur's forces advancing northwards along the railway line killed over 90 Filipino soldiers.
- Battle of Malinta (March 26, 1899) – An American unit entered the town of Malinta and found defensive positions there deserted. Once in the town, they came under a hail of fire. Captain John Ballance rallied the troops and led the battalion in an assault that turned a potential slaughter into a victory. For that action, Ballance was breveted to the rank of lieutenant colonel.
- Battle of Marilao River (March 27, 1899) – in one of the most celebrated river crossings of the war, American forces crossed the Marilao river (80 yards wide and too deep to ford) while under fire from the opposite bank.
- Battle of the Bocaue river (March 29, 1899) – American forces were ambushed in midcrossing at the river northwest of the town of Bocaue, Bulacan, taking 29 casualties in ten minutes.
- Capture of Malolos (March 31, 1899) – Malolos, northwest of Bocaoe, was taken by American forces unopposed. As the troops entered the town, buildings on all sides burst into flame, having been ignited by retreating Filipino forces under General Antonio Luna. When the fires were spent, the town was gutted.
- Battle of Quingua (April 23, 1899) – Filipino General Gregorio del Pilar stops American cavalry scouts on Luzon, but is then routed after an artillery bombardment and infantry ground assault. U.S. Colonel John M. Stotsenburg killed in battle.
- Battle of Calumpit, (April 25, 1899) – American forces assault the heavily defended stronghold across a wide river, overrunning it after a day of heavy fighting.

=== Laguna de Bay campaign (April 8–17, 1899) ===
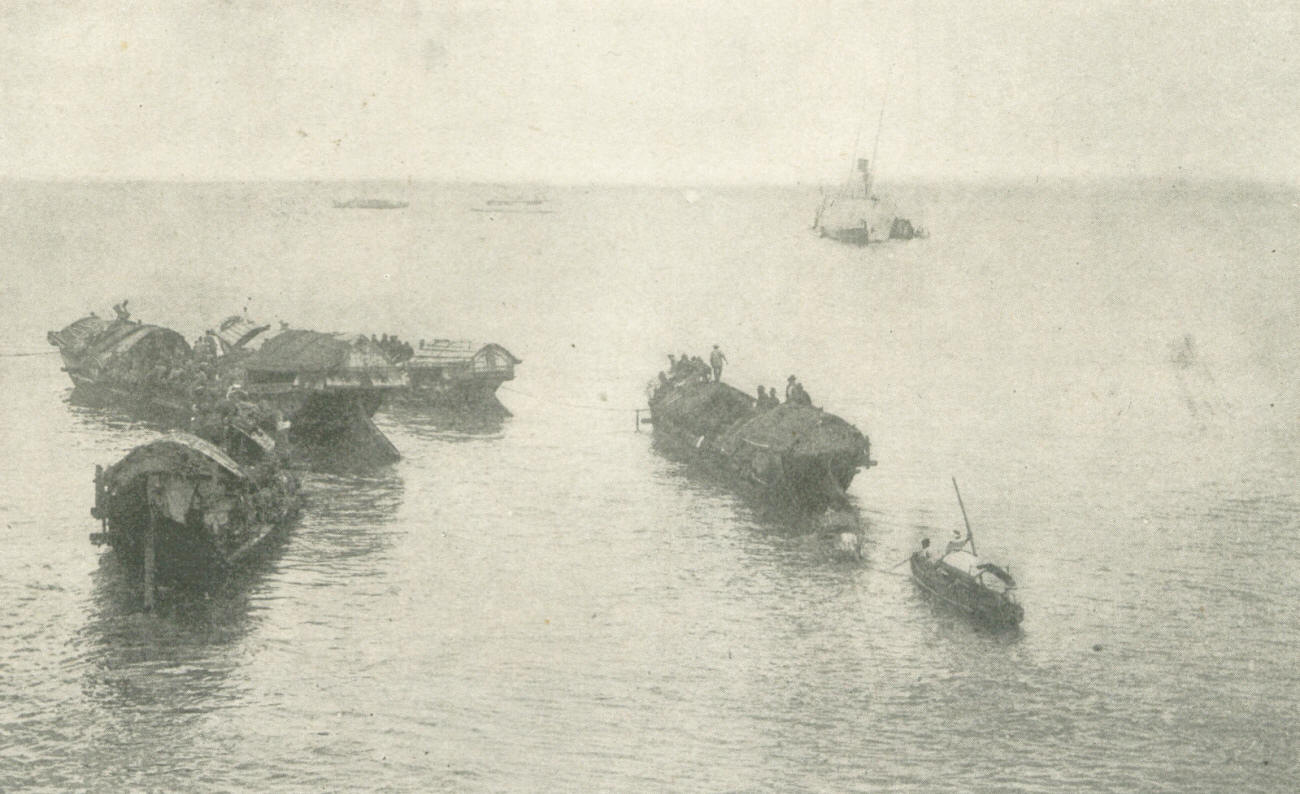
Cascoes being towed by the Laguna de Bay

In March, Brig. Gen. Loyd Wheaton's forces had fought its way through Pasig, Pateros and Taguig along the Marikina, Taguig and Pasig Rivers to Laguna de Bay, cutting the Filipino army into northern and southern components and allowing gunboats to patrol the lake. The Laguna de Bay campaign was conducted between April 8 and 17, 1899. While MacArthur's column had been hammering the insurgents along the railroad to the north, Major General Henry Lawton took his column south, captured Santa Cruz in the Laguna de Bay area on April 10, and returned to Manila on April 17. Otis recalled Lawton from the Laguna de Bay Campaign despite Lawton's desire to capture the town of Calamba. As Lawton's forces departed, they could see Filipino troops reoccupying Santa Cruz.

=== Significant battles: Laguna de Bay campaign ===
- Battle of Santa Cruz (April 9 – 10, 1899) – U.S. General Henry W. Lawton captures Filipino stronghold of Santa Cruz and pushes into Laguna province on Luzon.
- Battle of Pagsanjan (April 11, 1899) – American sharpshooters skirmish with Filipinos outside of Pagsanjan, succeeding in driving them out. General Lawton's troops take Pagsanjan in the second action of the Laguna Campaign.
- Battle of Paete (April 12, 1899) – General Lawton's forces disperse Filipinos blocking route to Paete in a stiff fight, taking Paete. This was the last action of the Laguna Campaign.

=== First San Isidro campaign (April 21 – May 30, 1899) ===
The first San Isidro campaign was conducted between April 21 and May 30, 1899. MacArthur's forces, Lawton commanding the 1st Brigade and Irving Hale the 2nd Brigade, captured Calumpit on 25 April and soon crossed the Rio Grande despite Luna's formidable defenses manned by 4,000 soldiers. Yet, MacArthur's offensive stalled after capturing San Fernando on 5 May. Lawton's troops captured Norzagaray, Bulacan on April 25 and Angat, Bulacan on 27 April.

After a pause while negotiations were underway in Manila, Lawton resumed his advance, and captured San Rafael, Baliwag and Bustos on 2 May.

At Baliwag on May 7, Lawton issued General Field Order No. 8, which authorized the creation of the first local government under the Americans as follows:

For the purpose of official and just representation of the inhabitants of this town with military authorities, as well as for temporary convenience in restoring and maintaining order among the former, the citizens were authorized to meet and elect a mayor (capitan municipal). The result of such meeting has been the election of señor Francisco Guerrero, who is therefore announced as Mayor and authorized to select a council and such other assistants or officers as may be necessary to properly administer municipal affairs. He will be accordingly respected and obeyed.

Waiting to advance until 11 May, Lawton's force took San Miguel on 16 May, and San Isidro on May 17. Aguinaldo and fragments of the insurgent Philippine Republic government had fled to Tarlac.

==== Significant battles: First San Isidro campaign ====
- Battle of San Isidro, on May 16, 1899, American scouts reconnoitering the approaches to San Isidro discovered and engaged large Filipino force burning a bridge. Four of the scouts charged over the bridge and engaged the Filipinos, one being Marcus W. Robertson the rest forded the river, beat out the flames, and saved the bridge. The next day, American forces crossed the bridge and captured San Isidro, which had been the temporary seat of Aguinaldo's insurgent government. Aguinaldo had already left before the town fell, however, taking with him 13 American captives.

=== Zapote River campaign (June 13, 1899) ===
The Zapote River campaign was completed in a single day, June 13, 1899, and consisted largely of a single battle. Operations in Luzon in mid-1899 had halted for the rainy season. During this pause the first Philippine Scouts units were organized and large numbers of additional troops began to arrive, bringing the strength of the American force (Eighth Army Corps) to some 47,500 men by the end of the year and 75,000 a year later. Following the murder of Luna, Aguinaldo had about 4,000 soldiers, mostly located along the Manila-Dagupan railroad, under the command of Tomas Mascardo, Servillano Aquino and Luciano San Miguel in Pampanga; Pio del Pilar and Urbano Lacuna in Bulacan, Francisco Macabulos in Tarlac; Gregorio del Pilar in Pangasinan; Manuel Tinio in Ilocano; and Daniel Tirona in the Cagayan Valley.

- Battle of Zapote Bridge (June 13, 1899) – In one of the hardest-fought engagements of the war, Lawton's forces routed a large Filipino force under General Pío del Pilar, and inflicted heavy casualties in the second largest battle of the Philippine–American War.

=== Naval Blockade and Treaty ===
Admiral John C. Watson on 19 Aug., initiated a blockade of "any vessel flying the Philippine Republic's flag, any vessel trading with closed ports or any vessel laded with contraband of war". The navy used 25 seagoing gunboats, complementary to the army's 10 river steamers, which were armed with cannons and machine guns, and stationed them at Zamboanga, Cebu, Iloilo and Vigan.

On 20 Aug., Brig. Gen. John C. Bates and the Sultan of Sulu signed a treaty in which the Sultan accepted American sovereignty, allowing the U.S. to garrison Jolo, Zamboanga and Siassi.

=== Cavite campaign (October 7 and 13, 1899) ===
The Cavite campaign was conducted between October 7 and 13, 1899. In October 1899, organized resistance in Cavite and adjacent provinces was destroyed by forces under General Lawton, Col. William Bisbee, and Brig. Gen. Theodore Schwan. In the same month, General Otis launched a three-pronged offensive in North Luzon directed at Aguinaldo's remaining forces.

Perhaps as a diversion, Filipino forces south of Manila had attacked Calamba and Los Baños in Laguna and Imus and Bacoor in Cavite in late 1899. In order to free troops to join the advance north, Otis moved to "attack and severely punish these Cavite insurgents". Lawton headed south with three columns. One column swept the lines between Imus and Bacoor and along Laguna de Bay, a second moved along the west shore of Manila Bay, with warships providing fire support, and a third advanced down a narrow peninsula from the Cavite naval station to Noveleta.

=== Second San Isidro campaign (October 10 – November 20, 1899) ===
A second San Isidro campaign was conducted between October 10 and November 20, 1899. Lawton's column moved up the Pampanga River, recaptured San Isidro on October 20, and entered San Fabian, Pangasinan, in Lingayen Gulf on November 18. The advance was spearheaded on 10 Oct. by a brigade under General Samuel Young, aided by Matthew Batson's Macabebe Scouts and the Lowe Scouts, which entered Arayat on the 12th and reentered San Isidro on October 20. Young pressed northeast towards Cabanatuan, Nueva Ecija, a city reputed to hold two dozen American and 4,000 Spanish prisoners of war, advancing slowly over difficult terrain. After Cabanatuan, Young took a Cavalry Brigade of 1,100 men, including the Macabebes, onwards to San Jose on 12 Nov., Umangan on 13 Nov., and then the passes at Tayug and San Nicholas on 16 Nov. Young captured San Fernando de la Union on 20 Nov., with the aid of the Samar, while the Oregon occupied Vigan.

=== Tarlac campaign (November 5–20, 1899) ===
The Tarlac campaign was conducted between November 5 and 20, 1899. MacArthur's forces advanced through the Central Luzon plain, seized Tarlac on November 12, and reached Dagupan on November 20. On November 5, MacArthur's forces, Col. Jacob H. Smith's 17th Infantry, J. Franklin Bell's 36th, and Joseph Wheeler's 9th and 12th Infantry, began clearing out the countryside between his garrison in Angeles City and Arayat, Pampanga in Pampanga, and intending to advance onwards to Bamban, Tarlac. Though hampered by a typhoon which caused rivers to rise ten feet and washed out roads, the forces entered the town of Tarlac on November 12. After delaying four days to repair washed-out roads and bring up supplies, a 900-man task force crossed a half-mile washout on November 17 and occupied Bayambang, Pangasinan on November 19 and entered Dagupan the next day. Brig. Gen. Frederick D. Grant later captured Subic Bay.

=== San Fabian campaign (November 6–19, 1899) ===
The San Fabian campaign was conducted between November 6 and 19, 1899. General Wheaton, with Bisbee's 13th Infantry and Luther Hare's 33 Infantry, sailed from Manila on the 6th, landed at San Fabian (November 7), routed insurgents at San Jacinto (November 11), and linked up with MacArthur's column at Dagupan on November 20.

==== Significant battles: San Fabian campaign ====
- Battle of San Jacinto (November 11, 1899) – U.S. General Loyd Wheaton drives Filipinos out of San Jacinto, Luzon.

=== Cagayan Valley (Dec. 1899) ===
Comdr. Bowman H. McCalla accepted the surrender of Daniel Tirona's forces at Aparri, Cagayan, on 11 Dec. McCalla then rendezvoused with Capt. Joseph Batchelor's 24th Infantry, Buffalo Soldiers, on 13 Dec.

Following the Battle of Tangadan Pass on 4 Dec., Col. Luther Hare's 220 men of the 33rd Infantry headed south, while Lt. Col. Robert Lee Howze's 130 men of the 34th Infantry headed north, and succeeded in freeing several hundred Spanish, and 26 American prisoners, including Lt. James Gillmore's men of the Siege of Baler, from Manuel Tinio's Brigade by 18 Dec.

=== Significant actions outside of campaigns ===
==== Pursuit of Aguinaldo (1899) ====
On October 31, 2nd Division scouts intercepted a message from Aguinaldo dated October 5, declaring that he was shifting his capital to Bayombong, Nueva Vizcaya. Elements from the Second San Isidro campaign and the San Fabian campaign reacted to this unexpected circumstance in an attempt to capture him.

Aguinaldo, retreating before MacArthur's advancing troops, had left his latest temporary capital in Tarlac and moved north up the railroad to Bayombong. At a November 13 conference, he decided to disperse his army and begin guerrilla war, then rode the train north 20 miles and set off across country for Pozorrubio, Pangasinan, 12 miles to the east. Aguinaldo was met en route by General Gregorio del Pilar, swelling his party to over 1,200. Aguinaldo reached Pozorrubio on November 14, but his rear guard had been attacked by pursuing American troops and his mother and son captured. When the American troops entered Pozorrubio the next morning, Aguinaldo had already left. Recognizing that American troops blocked his escape east, Aguinaldo turned north and west on November 15, crossing the mountains into La Union province.

Lawton wanted to send Young north to intercept Aguinaldo, but Otis ordered Lawton to advance no further north than San Jose, Nueva Ecija, and to dispatch troops to seal off passes to the east. With permission from Lawton, Young proceeded north from Cabanatuan on 7 November with an 1,100-man cavalry brigade, towards Tayug, Pangasinan, intending to block Aguinaldo's escape route.

Aguinaldo's escape north from Pozorrubio should have been blocked by a force under General Wheaton which had left Manila by sea on November 6 and arrived in San Fabian, Pangasinan the next day. Shortly after that force came ashore, however, a typhoon struck, flooded the countryside, and made movement almost impossible. Wheaton was not able to send troops to Pozorrubio until November 16, the day after Aguinaldo had left. Having dispersed his army, Aguinaldo was no longer limited to routes able to accommodate a large force. He could now travel rapidly in small parties, and his destination was more difficult for pursuing American forces to predict.

On November 17, Aguinaldo reached Naguilian, La Union. Young, suspecting that Aguinaldo was moving up the west coast and that he might turn eastwards at Candon, Ilocos Sur, in the direction of the Tirad Pass, sent Peyton C. March's battalion to block the pass. On December 2, that battalion engaged Aguinaldo's rear guard in the Battle of Tirad Pass, in which General Gregario del Pilar was killed. Aguinaldo had escaped through the pass. At the time of the battle, Aguinaldo and his party were encamped in Cervantes, about 10 km south of the pass. After being notified by a rider of the outcome of the battle and the death of Del Pilar, Aguinaldo ordered that camp be broken, and departed with his party for Cayan settlement.

- Battle of Tirad Pass (December 2, 1899) – In Luzon, 60 Filipinos under General Gregorio del Pilar hold off 500 American infantrymen for five hours in a delaying action to ensure General Emilio Aguinaldo's escape. Nearly all are killed, including del Pilar.

Aquinaldo was then on the move in the mountains until Sept. 1900, when he established his headquarters in Palanan. Maj. Gen. Pantaleon Garcia, revolutionary commander of Central Luzon, was captured in May 1900, while Gen. Servillano Aquino, Francisco Macabulos, and Pio del Pilar surrendered in June.

==== Other significant battles, campaign and expedition (1899–1900) ====
- Battle of Paye (December 19, 1899) – In Luzon Filipino General Licerio Gerónimo's forces kill General Lawton.
- Cavite, Batangas, Tayabas, and Laguna campaign (Jan. 1900) – Otis' campaign in the southern Tagalog provinces, sent Col. Robert L. Bullard to break the siege of Calamba by Brig. Gen. Miguel Malvar and his subordinate Mariano Noriel, followed by Brig. Generals Theodore Schwan and Loyd Wheaton driving out the forces of Mariano Trias and Brig. Gen. Martin Cabrera.
- "Hemp Expedition" (18-27 Jan. 1900) – Brig. Gen. William A. Kobbe and Commodore Raymond P. Rodgers, landed units of the 43rd and 47th Infantry at ports associated with the cultivation of abaca, used for cordage. Escorted by the Helena, Nashville, and Mariveles, steam launches would tow a line of boats loaded with soldiers to shore, capturing Sorsogon City, Legazpi City, Calbayog, Catbalogan, Tacloban, and Ormoc. At the time, Philippine Republic generals controlling the associated provinces were Vicente Lukban on Samar, Ambrosio Moxica on Leyte, and Vito Belarmino on Bicol.
- Siege of Catubig (April 15, 1900) – Filipino guerrillas launch a surprise attack against a detachment of American soldiers and after a four-day siege, forced them to evacuate the town of Catubig in Samar.
- Battle of Makahambus Hill (June 4, 1900) – On Makahambus Hill, in Cagayan de Misamis, Northern Mindanao (present day Cagayan de Oro), Filipinos rout an American regiment and inflict heavy casualties, but take less than five casualties of their own. It is the only known major victory by Filipino forces in Mindanao.
- Battle of Pulang Lupa (September 13, 1900) – On the island of Marinduque, Filipino forces under Colonel Maximo Abad ambush a force of 52 American infantrymen under Captain Devereux Shields.
- Battle of Mabitac (September 17, 1900) – Filipino forces outmaneuver and rout American forces in Luzon.

==== Capture of Aguinaldo (1901) ====
Several revolutionary leaders surrendered in 1901. On 10 Jan., Martín Teófilo Delgado surrendered on Panay, and on 29 March, Nicolas Capistrano in northern Mindanao and Mariano Trias in Southern Luzon on 13 May. Manuel Tinio and Jose Alejandrino surrendered on 29 April, Lacuna on 19 May, Juan Cailles on 24 June, Moxica surrendered in Leyte on 18 May, and Belarmino on 4 July.

On March 23, 1901 General Frederick Funston and his troops captured Aguinaldo in Palanan, Isabela, with the help of some Filipinos (called the Macabebe Scouts after their home locale) who had joined the Americans' side. The Americans pretended to be captives of the Scouts, who were dressed in Philippine Army uniforms. Once Funston and his "captors" entered Aguinaldo's camp, they immediately fell upon the guards and quickly overwhelmed them and the weary Aguinaldo.

On April 1, 1901, at the Malacañan Palace in Manila, Aguinaldo swore an oath accepting the authority of the United States over the Philippines and pledging his allegiance to the American government. On April 19, he issued a Proclamation of Formal Surrender to the United States, telling his followers to lay down their weapons and give up the fight. "Let the stream of blood cease to flow; let there be an end to tears and desolation," Aguinaldo said. "The lesson which the war holds out and the significance of which I realized only recently, leads me to the firm conviction that the complete termination of hostilities and a lasting peace are not only desirable but also absolutely essential for the well-being of the Philippines."

==== Other significant battles (1901) ====
- Lonoy massacre (March 1901) – In a reverse ambush, U.S. infantrymen launch a surprise attack on Bohol natives and kill over 400.
- Balangiga massacre (September 28, 1901) Townspeople and guerrillas virtually annihilated the American garrison in Balangiga.
- March across Samar (November 1901)

== Ending the war in 1902 ==
Not all of the insurgent leaders had responded to Aguinaldo's acceptance of the United States authority and his call for an end to the fighting, but by July 1901 only Miguel Malvar in Batangas and Vincente Lukban in Samar still led forces capable of resisting American control. Malvar took over as President of the Philippine Republic as designated in Aguinaldo's decreed line of succession. He reorganized Filipino forces in southern Luzon and renamed the combined armed forces, which possessed around 10,000 rifles at the time, "Army of Liberation". He also reorganized the regional departments of the Republic, which included the Marianas as a separate province. Lukban was captured in February 1902 and Malvar on 16 April.

American President Theodore Roosevelt unilaterally declared the insurrection at an end on July 4, 1902. His official issuance, however, was a proclamation of general amnesty for persons who had participated in or supported Philippine insurrections against the U.S., and explicitly excluded parts of the territory "inhabited by Moro tribes".

On April 9, 2002, Philippine President Gloria Macapagal Arroyo proclaimed that the Philippine–American War had ended on April 16, 1902 with the surrender of General Malvar.

== Post-war period ==
=== Mindanao campaign (July 4, 1902 – December 31, 1904 and October 22, 1905) ===
The Mindanao campaign was conducted between July 4, 1902 and December 31, 1904, and included other action on October 22, 1905. In 1902 serious trouble began with the Moros, Muslim people in Mindanao and the Sulu Archipelago, who had never been completely subjugated by the Spanish. When the Army occupied former Spanish garrison points, the Moros began to raid villages, attack soldiers, and otherwise resist American jurisdiction. Between July 1902 and December 1904, and again late in 1905, the Army dispatched a series of expeditions into the interior of Mindanao to destroy Moro strongholds. Col. Frank D. Baldwin with some 1,000 men (including elements of his own 27th Infantry and a mountain battery) invaded the territory of the Sultan of Bayan near Lake Lanao and defeated the Sultan's forces in the hotly contested Battle of Bayan on May 2, 1902. Capt. John J. Pershing headed a similar expedition into the Lanao country in 1903, and Capt. Frank R. McCoy finally killed the notorious Moro outlaw, Dato Ali, in the Cotabato district in October 1905.

==== Significant battles: Mindanao campaign ====
- Battle of Dolores River (December 12, 1904) – In Samar, 37 Philippine Constabulary Scouts are ambushed by 1,000 Pulahans and nearly all are killed.

=== Jolo campaign (May 1–24, 1905, 6 –March 8, 1906 and June 11–15, 1913) ===
The Jolo campaign was conducted in three segments, May 1–24, 1905, 6–March 8, 1906 and June 11–15, 1913. In May 1905, March 1906, and June 1913, Regulars had to cope with disorders too extensive to be handled by the local constabulary and Philippine Scouts on the island of Jolo, a Moro stronghold. During May 1905, followers of a Sulu Moro leader named Pala gathered in a volcanic crater and surrendered to American forces. On March 6, 7, and 8, 1906 the battle of Bud Dajo was fought to a successful conclusion by Regulars and in mid-June 1913 Moros at Bagsac were whipped.

==== Significant battles: Jolo campaign ====
- First Battle of Bud Dajo (March 5–7, 1906) – One thousand Moros (including women and children) fortify themselves in an extinct volcanic crater on Mindanao and battle several hundred American soldiers, before virtually all are killed.
- Second Battle of Bud Dajo (December 1911) – In a five-day battle, an estimated 1500 Moros fortified the top of the extinct volcano. General John J. Pershing, through negotiations, succeeded in persuading the majority of the assembled Moros to return home. The remaining Moro forces, led by a chieftain named Jailani, were either killed or captured in the battle.
