= Battle of Santo Tomas =

1899 battle of the Philippine–American War

- Part of the Philippine–American War
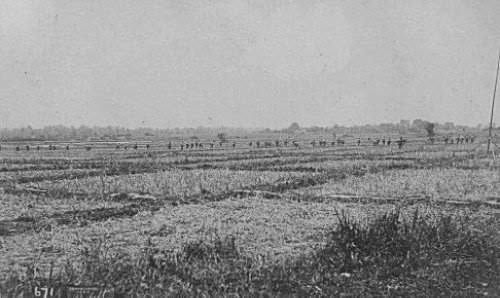
- 1st Nebraska Volunteers advancing during the Battle of Santo Tomas
Date	May 4, 1899
Location	Santo Tomas, Pampanga, Philippines
Result	American victory

Belligerents
United States	(First Philippine Republic) Philippine Republic

Commanders and leaders
(United States) Loyd Wheaton (United States) Irving Hale (United States) Frederick Funston	(First Philippine Republic) Antonio Luna (First Philippine Republic) Venacio Concepción (First Philippine Republic) Alejandro Avecilla

Strength
20th Kansas Volunteers; 1st Montana Volunteers; 1st Nebraska Volunteers; 51st Iowa Volunteers	Around 4,100

Casualties and losses
15 killed	35 dead 9 wounded

The Battle of Santo Tomas (Filipino: Labanan sa Santo Tomas, Spanish: Batalla de Santo Tomás) was fought on May 4, 1899, in Santo Tomas, Pampanga, during the Philippine–American War. During this battle, General Antonio Luna, the commander of the Filipino forces, was wounded. The Battle of Santo Tomas followed the Battle of Calumpit, wherein Luna's main force had fought that of General Arthur MacArthur, Jr. The battle resulted in a defeat of the Filipino forces around Santo Tomas and their withdrawal from the town.

== Background ==
After the fall of Calumpit and the march through the Calumpit–Apalit Line, the Americans' next objective was to capture San Fernando, Pampanga, which was immediately fronted by the Angeles–Magalang Line, the last of the three-tiered defense line Luna had made. Emilio Aguinaldo had transferred his capital to the nearby town of San Isidro, Nueva Ecija, before the Capture of Malolos on March 31. Luna's main force, which had been fighting the Americans since the fighting around Malolos, retreated to the nearby town of Santo Tomas by April 28. Therefore, the Americans decided that they had to capture Santo Tomas before taking San Fernando. As General Arthur MacArthur, Jr.'s main force rested in Malolos, Brigadier Generals Loyd Wheaton and Irving Hale's forces were committed to the advance, with Colonel Frederick Funston, their immediate deputy, spearheading the initial American attack.

== Battle ==
The battle featured an easy rout of the Filipino forces under Luna, numbering around 2,500, by Americans in Santo Tomas. In Funston's own account, he states that as soon as the Filipinos abandoned their trenches on the opposite bank of the lagoon, he sent two companies across to examine the vacated trenches and repair the railroad track that had been destroyed by the retreating Filipinos. However, when Lieutenant Colonel Cavestany brought up reinforcements consisting of about 1,600 men organized into eight companies, and crossed the bridge leading to San Fernando, Luna saw that the American advance could still be halted.

Mounted on his horse, Luna then charged into the battlefield leading his main force in a counterattack. As they advanced, the American forces began firing upon them. Amidst the fire, Luna's horse was hit and he fell to the ground. As he recovered, Luna realized that he had been shot in the stomach. Seeing the Americans coming towards him and deciding that he must not let himself be captured, he attempted to kill himself with his revolver. He was saved, though, by the actions of a Filipino colonel named Alejandro Avecilla who, having seen Luna fall, rode towards the general to save him. Despite being heavily wounded in one of his legs and an arm, with his remaining strength Avecilla carried Luna away from battle to the Filipino rear. Upon reaching safety, Luna realized that his wound was not very deep as most of the impact of the bullet had been taken by a silk belt full of gold coins that his parents had given him, which he had been wearing. As he left the field to have his wounds tended, Luna turned over the command to General Venacio Concepción, the Filipino commander of the nearby town of Angeles.

== Aftermath ==
Upon seeing Luna fall, the Americans responded with jubilation. As the Philippine Republic's Chief of War Operations in Central Luzon, Luna had been one of their most stubborn enemies in resisting their efforts to occupy the archipelago. Luna's death a month later would result in more celebrations by the Americans, who believed that the war would come to a swift conclusion with Luna's physical extinction.

American losses during the battle were two killed, while Filipino casualties are unknown. For his part in the battle, Luna was presented with the Medal of the Republic by Aguinaldo. On the back of the medal, Luna's heroic battles were inscribed with their corresponding dates. Later, he was promoted to lieutenant general.

On May 8, 1899, MacArthur captured San Fernando, and he stayed there to rest and improve his lines of communication. On May 12, Luna handed over command of the Angeles–Magalang Line to General Concepcion. Later that same month, Luna withdrew his staff and 3,000 men to Tarlac. On May 16, the Americans captured San Isidro, Nueva Ecija, but Aguinaldo yet again evaded his enemies by transferring the capital to Bamban, Tarlac.
