= Battle of San Roque (1899) =

Battle in the Philippine-American War

- Part of the Philippine–American War
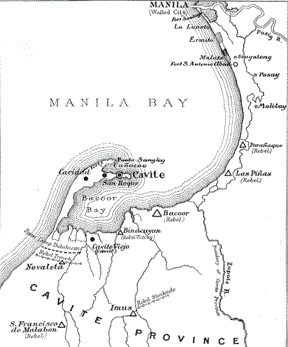
- Map of San Roque, in Manila Bay
| Date | 9 February 1899 |
| Location | San Roque, Cavite, Philippines |
| Result | American victory |
| Territorial changes | American capture of San Roque |

Belligerents
| United States | First Philippine Republic |

Commanders and leaders
| George Dewey; John C. Loper; John A. Glass | Salvador Estrella |

Strength
| 51st Iowa Volunteers; California Heavy Artillery; Wyoming Light Battery; Nevada Cavalry | Unknown |

Casualties and losses
| None | Unknown; Many captured |

The Battle of San Roque was fought during the Philippine-American War between the United States and the First Philippine Republic. The battle resulted in the Filipinos being pushed off the causeway near San Roque, and forcing them to abandon their planned attack upon Cavite City itself.

== Background ==
Filipino revolutionaries known as the Katipunan had been revolved against their colonial overlord Spain during the Philippine Revolution, which would go on to end more than 350 years of Spanish rule on the islands On 15 February 1898, an American battleship the USS Maine exploded off the coast of Cuba, which was having an ongoing revolution similar to that of the one in the Philippines. This would lead to the Spanish–American War between Spain and the United States on 21 April which would be fought on two fronts, in the Caribbean and the Pacific. The US supported revolutionaries in both Cuba and the Philippines against Spain, while the war itself did not last long as the Spanish Empire had long been declining ever since Napoleon invaded Spain in the early 19th century, while the US was a rising global power. On the Caribbean front the Americans naval advantage now began to show as the US was quickly able to establish a foothold and capture Santiago de Cuba and win a hard fought victory at the Battle of El Caney. The war on that front was concluded with Colonel Theodore Roosevelt's Rough Riders charge at the Battle of San Juan Hill and the naval Battle of Santiago de Cuba.

Meanwhile on the Pacific front Commodore George Dewey would be dispatched to the Philippines, and would subsequently annihilate the Spanish fleet at the Battle of Manila Bay. Meanwhile the US would also capture Guam and began preparing land forces to take the Philippines, in correlation with Filipino revolutionaries. The United States organized the Eighth Army Corps, dubbed the Philippine Expeditionary Force, under the command of Major General Wesley Merritt. On 16 May, the vanguard of the force left San Francisco under the command of Brigadier General Thomas Anderson. By June, U.S. and Filipino forces had taken control of most of the island, while the first contingents of American troops arrived in Cavite on 30 June, the second under General Francis Greene on 17 July, and the third under General Arthur MacArthur on 30 July. On 12 June 1898, one of the Filipino revolutionaries leaders, Emilio Aguinaldo issued a declaration of independence, proclaiming the sovereignty of the Philippines. American president William McKinley and his administration decided to ignore this and instead push for annexation. The Americans would win the final battle of the war at Manilia and in the 1898 Treaty of Paris, the Spanish–American War officially ended, and Spain agreed to cede control of the Philippines to the U.S.

This enraged the Filipino revolutionaries and tension greatly raised making war inevitable. The Philippine–American War officially broke out when Private William Walter Grayson of the 1st Nebraska Infantry Regiment fired upon a group of armed Filipinos near Manila, which started the war on the same day. The Filipinos immediately launched an attack upon Manila, but were soundly defeated by the better prepared and equipped Americans.

The American soldiers effectively became firefighters as they fought to put out the flames of San Roque.

== Aftermath ==
The battle ended the planned Filipino attack on Cavite City. The American casualties were none, while on the opposing side many Filipinos had been killed and even more captured. A day later the Americans would defeat the Filipinos yet again at the Battle of Caloocan, and a counter attack was also defeated. The Americans would go on to win the war and establish the Philippines as an overseas territory.
