= Battle of Calumpit =

1899 battle of the Philippine–American War

- Part of the Philippine–American War
- Frontline map situation of the Battle of Calumpit, April 27, 1899. The United States Army is colored blue and the Philippine Republican Army is colored brown.
Date	April 25–27, 1899
Location	Calumpit, Bulacan, Philippines
Result	American victory

Belligerents
United States	(First Philippine Republic) Philippine Republic

Commanders and leaders
(United States) Arthur MacArthur Jr. (United States) Loyd Wheaton (United States) Irving Hale (United States) Frederick Funston	(First Philippine Republic) Antonio Luna (First Philippine Republic) Gregorio del Pilar

Strength
20th Kansas Volunteers; Utah Volunteer Light Artillery; 1st Montana Volunteers; 1st Nebraska Volunteers; 51st Iowa Volunteers	3,000 soldiers including Luna Sharpshooters

Casualties and losses
700 killed (Philippine claim) 22 killed 127 wounded (American claim)	200 killed

The Battle of Calumpit (Filipino: Labanan sa Kalumpit), alternately known as the Battles of Bagbag and Pampanga Rivers, was fought from April 25–27, 1899, in Calumpit, Bulacan, during the Philippine–American War. Taking place after the Battle of Quingua, the fighting around Calumpit saw US forces under General Arthur MacArthur Jr. once again face General Antonio Luna's main force, with whom they had clashed during the fall of Malolos on March 31, 1899.

== Background ==
Beginning on March 25, the Americans began their drive to capture Malolos, the Philippine capital at the time, hoping that it would shatter the morale of the Filipino troops. This was achieved on March 31, amidst token resistance by about 5,000 Filipinos. The capital had already been transferred to San Isidro, Nueva Ecija, before the debacle, and the main Filipino force, under the command of General Antonio Luna, had moved to the Calumpit–Apalit Line. MacArthur, meanwhile, rested with his troops in Malolos to prepare the drive against the Calumpit–Apalit Line. The Battle of Quingua, which occurred on April 23, signaled the beginning of a new American offensive. It was one of the flanks in the Filipino line of defense.

== Battle ==
=== Bagbag River ===
Calumpit, only 8 kilometers (5.0 mi) north of Malolos, was the next American objective after they had taken Quingua. Luna, however, was nowhere near Calumpit for he had embarked on a journey to Guagua to punish General Tomás Mascardo, the military commander of Pampanga, for leaving his post to inspect troops in Arayat, Pampanga. He had been supposed to strengthen the defense of the Calumpit–Apalit Line by providing reinforcements in the area when needed. Mascardo had around 21,000 men under his command at the time. Luna took most of the defending cavalry and the artillery with him and General Del Pilar was left to counter the advancing American troops lacking their support.

Emilio Aguinaldo had ordered Luna to burn the railway bridge spanning the Bagbag River, but the latter ignored it. Thus, Del Pilar had cut the iron girders of the railway bridge with the plan to make the bridge collapse once the enemy train passed over it. However, the section of the bridge collapsed before the train bearing a machine gun had reached it.

Chinese porters pushed the train through the river as American troops swam to the opposite shore, where Filipino trenches were located. Other troops were promptly repairing the bridge to let their supply wagons cross over the river. By the time Luna had returned from Guagua, only Filipinos in the barrio of Santa Lucia were holding out against the Americans in the Bagbag sector. Luna tried to fight and repulse the Americans, but he was eventually forced to retreat, destroying bridges to slow the American advance as his troops fell back.

=== Pampanga River ===
On April 27, Colonel (later General) Frederick Funston directed his men to cross the other river in Calumpit, the 400-foot (120 m) wide Pampanga River, by establishing a rope ferry which was used to pull rafts across the river with tied ropes. The bridge had been destroyed by the Filipino soldiers and the river was too deep to swim. With 120 American troops, Funston went to a point far from the bridge where two privates swam with a rope to the opposite shore and attached the ropes to a portion of the Filipino trench, under heavy fire. The rope was then attached to three rafts loaded with 50 men and drawn to shore under enemy fire. Funston was on the first raft to cross the river.

A group of American soldiers then attacked the left flank of the Filipino positions in covered ways and trenches. The rest of the American troops crossed the bridge in single file. All the woodwork and most of the ironwork had already been removed. The 1st Nebraska Volunteers, acting as reserves, drove out the Filipino forces in three lines of entrenchments. For his actions at Calumpit, Funston earned a promotion and was later awarded the Medal of Honor.

== Aftermath ==
Following the battle, the American force rested before continuing their drive against Pampanga. On May 4, the Battle of Santo Tomas took place, which resulted in another American victory. San Fernando fell to American control on May 8, and San Isidro, Nueva Ecija, the capital after Malolos, fell on May 16.

On the American side, three earned the Medal of Honor for their performance in the battle. They were Colonel Funston, Private (later First Lieutenant) William B. Trembley, and Private Edward White.

The casualty figures reported by Luna to Aguinaldo by telegram were 700 dead on the American side, and 200 on the Filipino side. The American official history, however, recorded only 22 dead and 127 wounded in their ranks. Filipino representatives meeting with the Schurman Commission a few days after the battle mentioned that Aguinaldo had expected Calumpit to be "the cemetery of the American army."

== Gallery ==
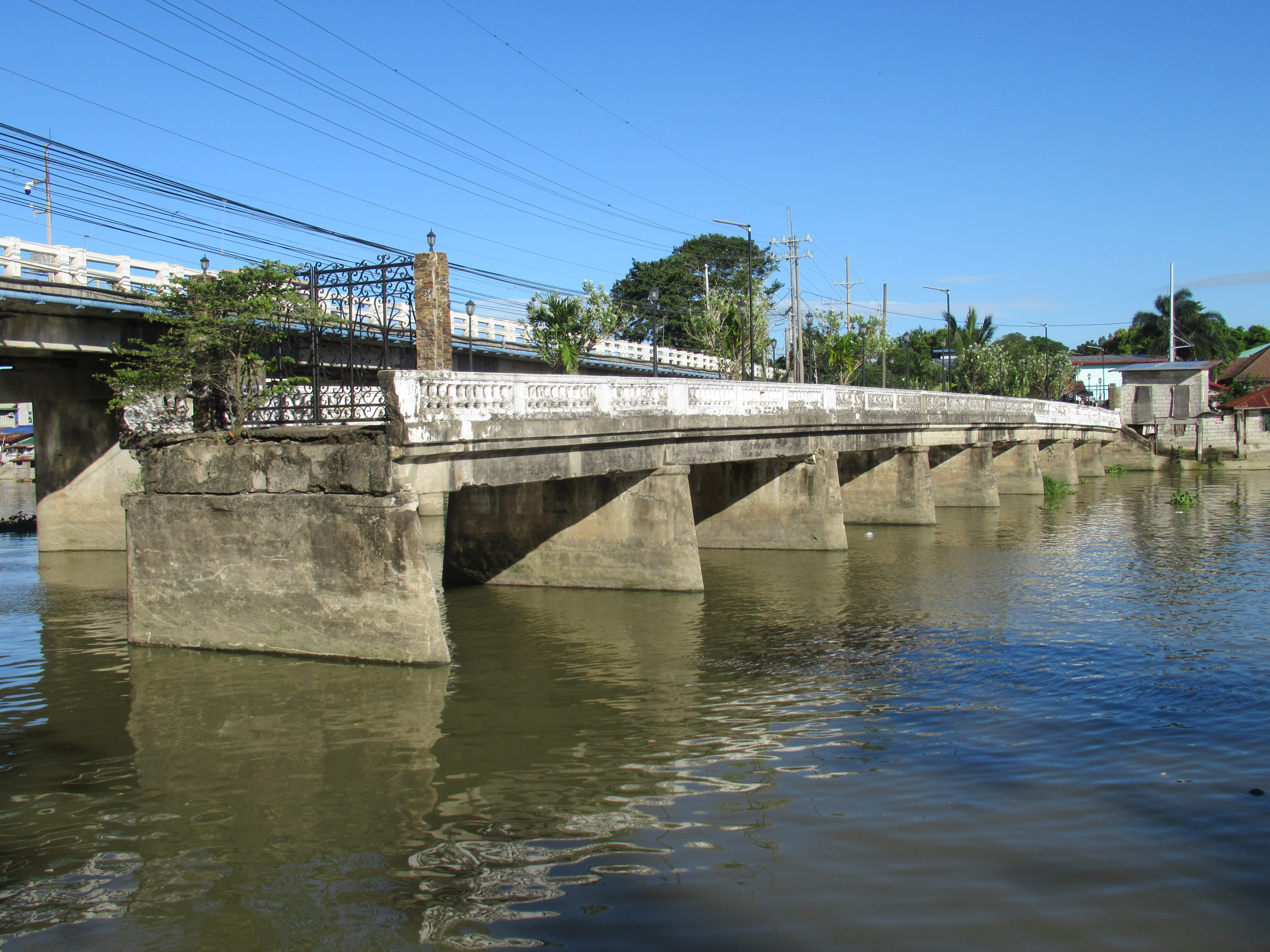
Old Bagbag Bridge, Calumpit (Bagbag) River

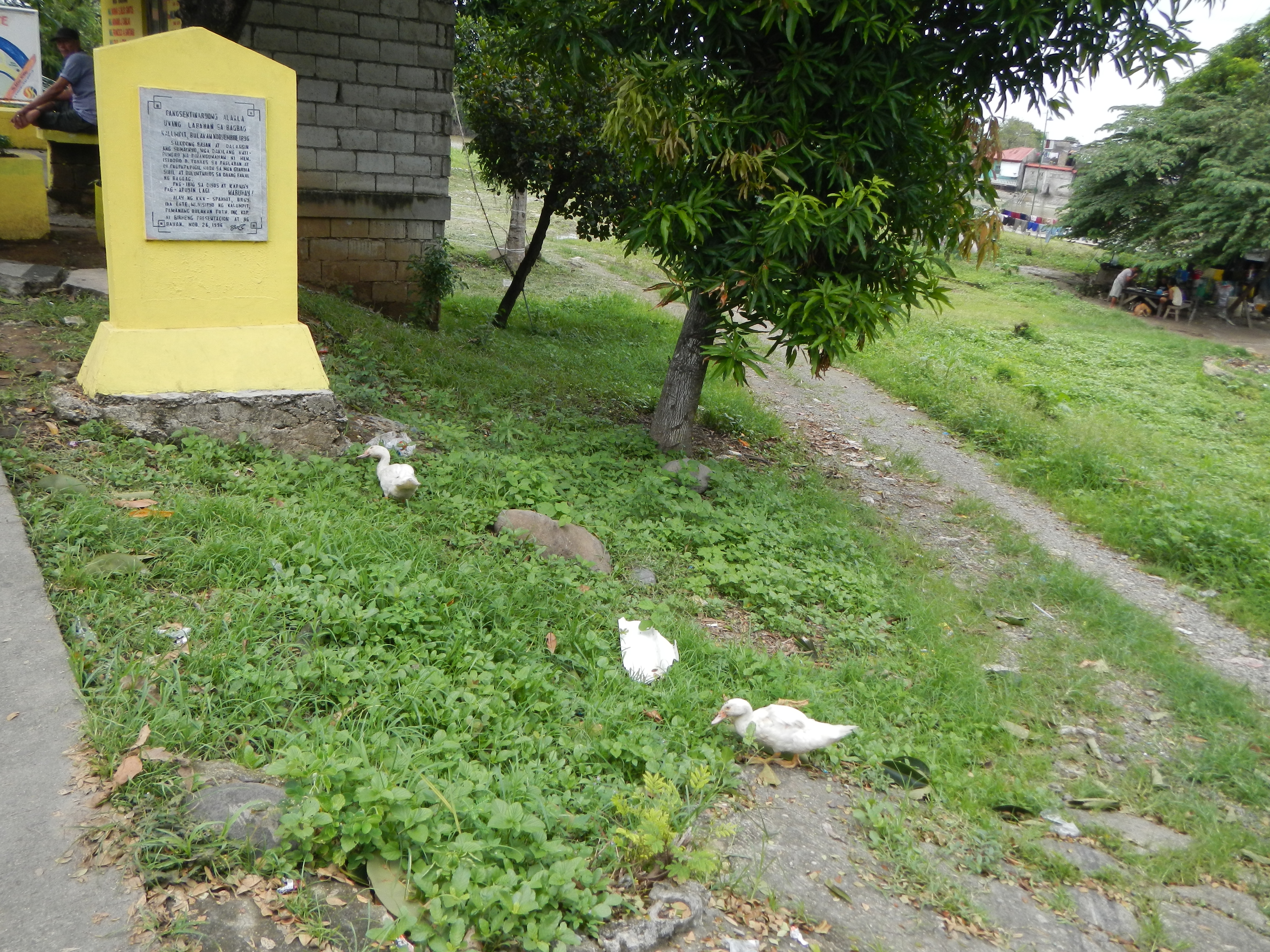
Battle of Calumpit (Bagbag Railway Bridge ) Centennial Marker

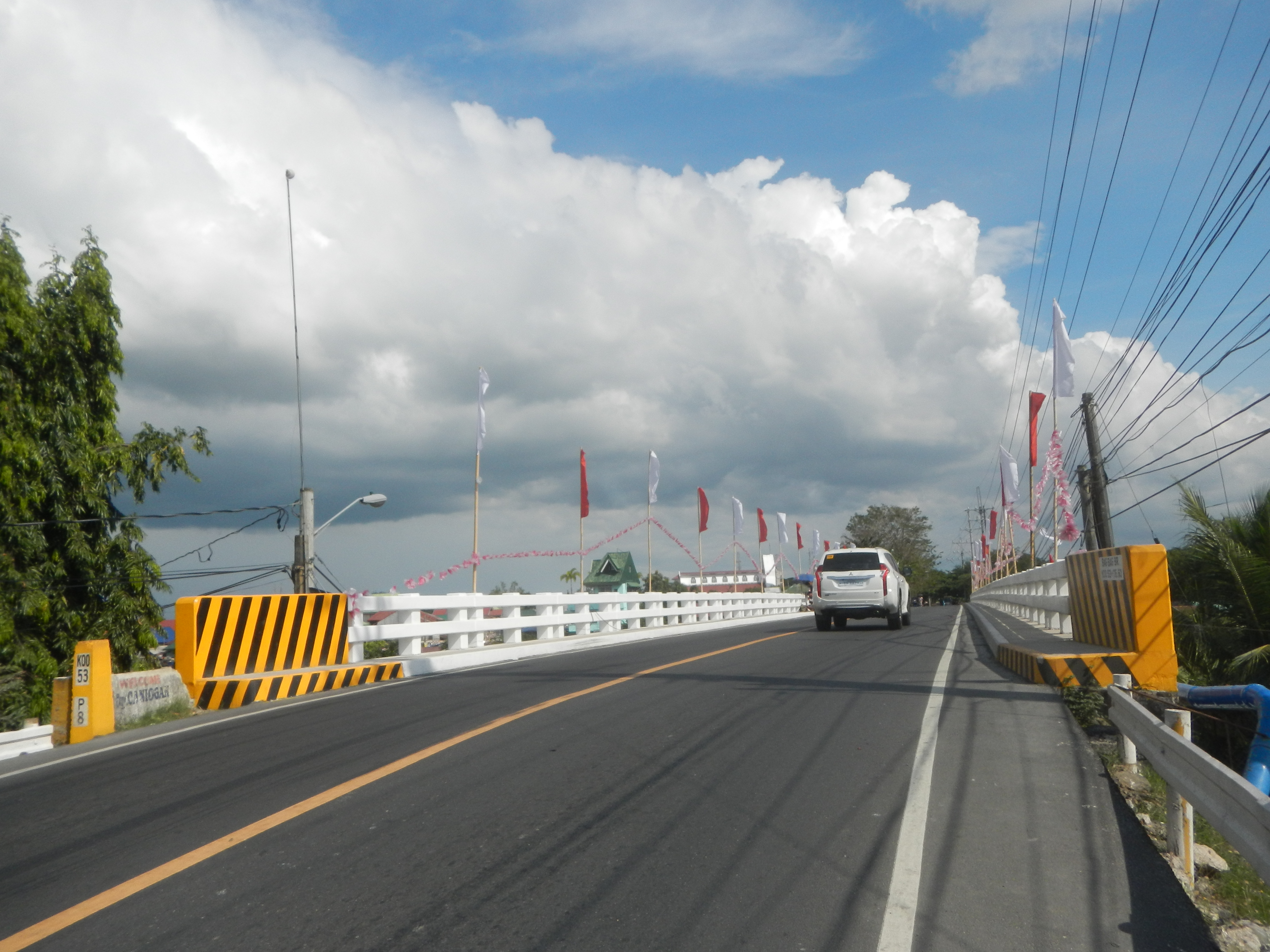
New Bag-Bag Bridge (Santo Niño & Caniogan), Calumpit
