= 51st Iowa Volunteer Infantry Regiment =

- Active: 30 May 1898 – 2 November 1899
- Country: United States
- Type: Regiment
- Role: Infantry
- Size: 1,344
- Engagements: Spanish-American War; Philippine–American War: Battle of San Roque; Battle of Quingua; Battle of Calumpit; Battle of Santo Tomas

The 51st Iowa Volunteer Infantry Regiment was raised in Iowa in 1898 for service in the Philippines Theater of the Spanish–American War. The volunteers trained in Iowa and San Francisco at Camp Merritt near the Presidio, where a monument to the regiment still stands. While in California nearly 27 men died from disease, which made disease the leading cause of death amongst the men. From California they embarked on the SS Pennsylvania for Manila. After a lengthy and illness plagued voyage, the regiment arrived and were made to wait on board ship near Cavite.

Of the 1,344 who served, 2 died in combat, 41 died of disease, 38 were wounded, 81 were discharged on disability, and 1 deserted. The regiment left for the United States on September 22, 1899, arrived 30 days later, and on November 2, was released after 18 months of duty.

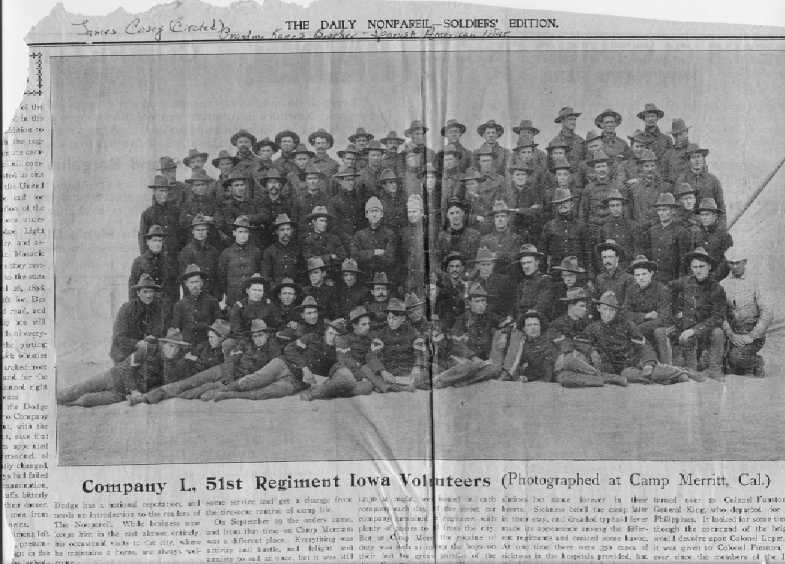
51st Iowa Volunteers, Company L
