= Harrison Gray =

Harrison Gray may refer to:

- Harrison Gray (Treasurer) (1711-1794), Treasurer and Receiver-General for the Province of Massachusetts Bay
- Harrison Gray (ice hockey) (1941-2022), Canadian ice hockey player
- Harrison Gray (footballer) (born 2007), English footballer

== See also ==
- Harrison Gray Otis (disambiguation)
