= Eighth Army Corps (Spanish–American War) =

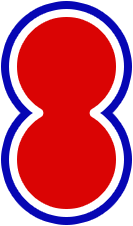
- Active: 1898–1900
- Country: United States of America
- Branch: Army of the United States
- Type: Corps
- Role: Infantry
- Size: 10,844
- Engagements: Spanish–American War; Battle of Manila (1898); Philippine–American War; Battle of Manila (1899)

Commanders
- Notable commanders: Major General Wesley Merritt; Major General Elwell Stephen Otis; Major General Arthur MacArthur

Insignia
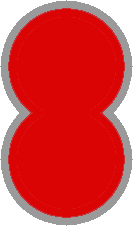
- Eighth Corps 1st Division

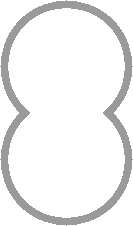
- Eighth Corps 2nd Division

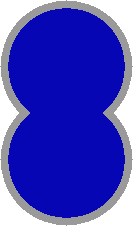
- Eighth Corps 3rd Division

The Eighth Army Corps was formed on June 21, 1898, shortly after the outbreak of the Spanish–American War, in order to provide a ground contingent to exploit Commodore George Dewey's success in defeating the Spanish fleet in Manila Bay on May 1, 1898.

San Francisco was the natural point of departure, but troops stationed there had been deployed to Cuba at the outbreak of the war. Colonel Thomas M. Anderson, who commanded the last remaining regiment on the coast, was ordered to San Francisco, made brigadier general of volunteers, and put in charge of the preliminary arrangements pending the selection of the officer to command the expedition that was to become Eighth Corps. Major General Wesley Merritt was later selected to command Eighth Corps, which had only one division, numbered as the Second Division, with General Andersom selected to command it.

Eighth Corps defeated the Spanish forces under the command of Governor-General of the Philippines Fermín Jáudenes in the Battle of Manila on August 13, 1898 and continued to prosecute the Spanish–American War and the Philippine–American War until, at the end of March 1900, the complexities involved in dealing with guerrilla warfare and governing the islands led to the transformation of what had been the Department of the Pacific into the Division of the Philippines with four geographical departments, each of which was in turn divided into military districts. This step brought an end to the Eighth Corps. Units of the former Eighth Corps fought to an eventual victory in the Philippine–American War in July 1902.

== Order of Battle 1898 ==
Following is the Order of battle for the Eighth Army Corps:

For details of the campaign in Cuba, see Battle of Manila (1898)

Commanding General, Eighth Army Corps: Major General Wesley Merritt

- 2nd Division - Brigadier General Thomas M. Anderson
  - 1st Brigade - Brigadier General Arthur MacArthur Jr.
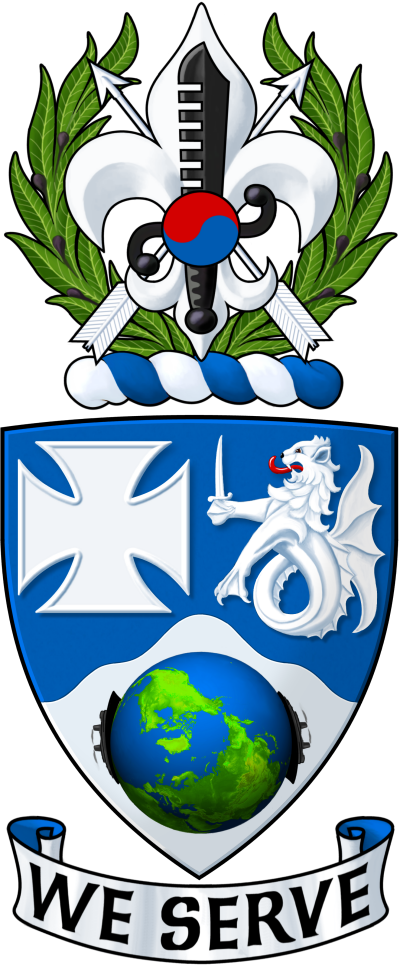
    - 23rd Infantry Regiment - Lieutenant Colonel John W. French Jr.
    - 14th Infantry Regiment - Colonel Thomas M. Anderson
    - 13th Minnesota Volunteer Infantry Regiment - Col. Charles McCormick Reeve
    - 1st North Dakota Volunteer Infantry Regiment - Lt. Col. Amasa P. Peake
    - 1st Idaho Volunteer Infantry Regiment - Lt. Col. John W. Jones
    - 1st Wyoming Volunteer Infantry Regiment - Col. DeForest Richards
    - Astor Battery - Captain Peyton C. March
  - 2nd Brigade - Brigadier General Francis Vinton Greene
    - 18th U.S. Infantry Regiment - Col. David D. Van Valzah
      - 1st Battalion - Lieutenant Colonel Clarence M. Bailey
      - 2nd Battalion - Major Charles Keller
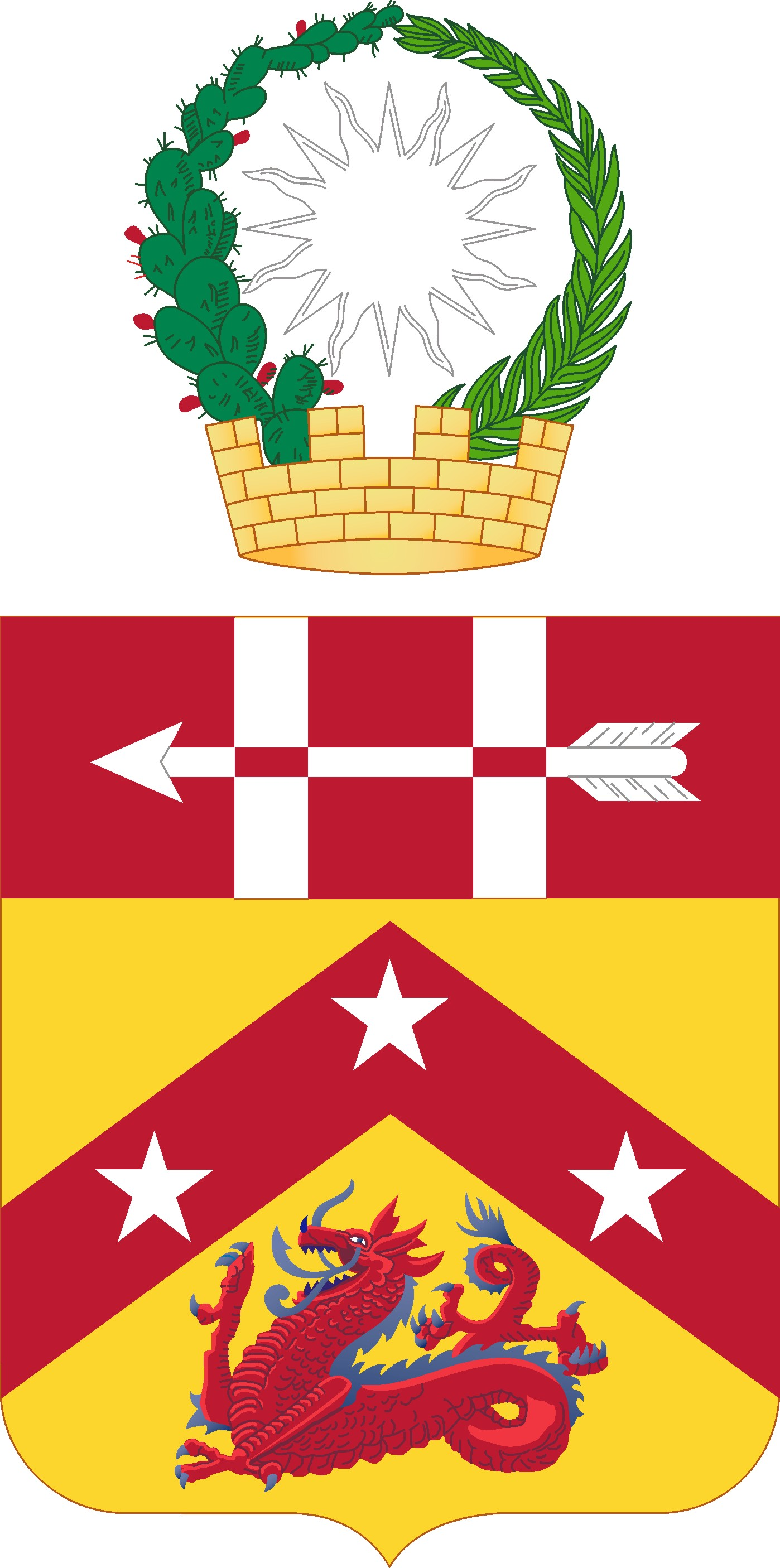
    - 3rd U.S. Artillery Regiment - Maj. William August Kobbé
      - 1st Battalion - Captain James O'Hara
      - 2nd Battalion - Captain William E. Birkhimer
    - U.S. Engineer Battalion, Company A - 2nd Lieutenant William Durward Connor
    - 1st California Infantry Regiment - Colonel James Francis Smith
    - 1st Colorado Infantry Regiment - Colonel Irving Hale
    - 1st Nebraska Volunteer Infantry Regiment - Colonel John P. Bratt
    - 2nd Oregon Volunteer Infantry Regiment - Colonel Owen Summers
    - 10th Pennsylvania Volunteer Infantry Regiment - Colonel Alexander Leroy Hawkins
    - 1st Tennessee Volunteer Infantry Regiment - Colonel William Crawford Smith, later Colonel Francis Gracey Childers
    - Utah Volunteer Artillery Regiment - Colonel Harry B. Mulford
      - Light Battery A - Captain Richard W. Young
      - Light Battery B - Captain Frank A. Grant
    - California Volunteer Heavy Artillery Detachment - 1st Lieutenant John A. Koster

== Order of Battle 1899 ==
- 2nd Division - Major General Arthur MacArthur Jr.
  - 1st Brigade - Brigadier General Harrison G. Otis
    - 3rd Artillery Regiment
    - 20th Kansas Volunteer Infantry Regiment
    - 1st Montana Volunteer Infantry Regiment
  - 2nd Brigade - Brigadier General Irving Hale
    - 1st Colorado Volunteer Infantry Regiment
    - 1st Nebraska Volunteer Infantry Regiment
    - 1st South Dakota Volunteer Infantry Regiment
    - 10th Pennsylvania Volunteer Infantry Regiment
  - 3rd Brigade - Brigadier General Robert Henry Hall
    - 4th Infantry Regiment
    - 17th Infantry Regiment
    - 13th Minnesota Volunteer Infantry Regiment
    - 1st Wyoming Volunteer Infantry Regiment
    - 4th Cavalry Regiment
    - Utah Light Artillery

== See also ==
- Camp Merritt, California
- Corps Badges of the Spanish-American War by Robert Borrel Sr. at JSTOR
