= 1st Nebraska Infantry Regiment (1898) =

United States Army unit

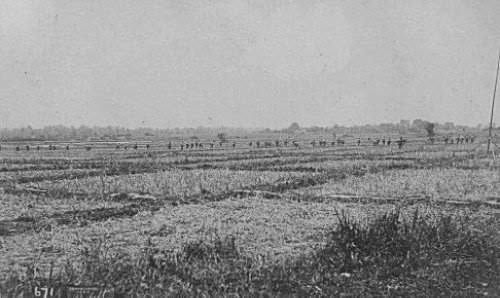
- The 1st Nebraska Infantry Regiment advancing on Santo Tomas
- Active: May 10 or 12, 1898 – August 23, 1899
- Country: United States
- Branch: Infantry
- Size: Regiment
- Engagements: Spanish–American War; Battle of Manila (1898); Philippine–American War; Battle of Manila (1899); Battle of Marilao River; Capture of Malolos; Battle of Quingua; Battle of Calumpit; Battle of Santo Tomas

Commanders
- Colonel: John P. Bratt
- Colonel: John M. Stotsenburg
- Major: Harry Mulford

The 1st Nebraska Infantry Regiment was an infantry regiment that served in the United States Army during the Spanish–American War and the Philippine–American War. After mustering in May 1898 for service in the Spanish–American War, the regiment trained in Nebraska and at Camp Merritt in California before leaving for the Philippines in June. The regiment was present in the actions against Manila in August, including the capture of the city. Remaining in the Philippines through the rest of the year, the 1st Nebraska was engaged when Philippine-American War and the 1899 Battle of Manila began with William W. Grayson firing the first shot of the war. After fighting in the Battle of Manila and then guarding a water pipeline, the regiment was present in a campaign that began in late March and resulted in the Capture of Malolos, fighting in several battles. In April, the regiment fought at the Battle of Quingua, where its commander, Colonel John M. Stotsenburg, was killed. After fighting in Battle of Calumpit and the Battle of Santo Tomas the regiment occupied San Fernando before being returned to Manila. On July 1, the regiment boarded the steamship SS Hancock, which brought the men back to the United States, where they mustered out on August 23.

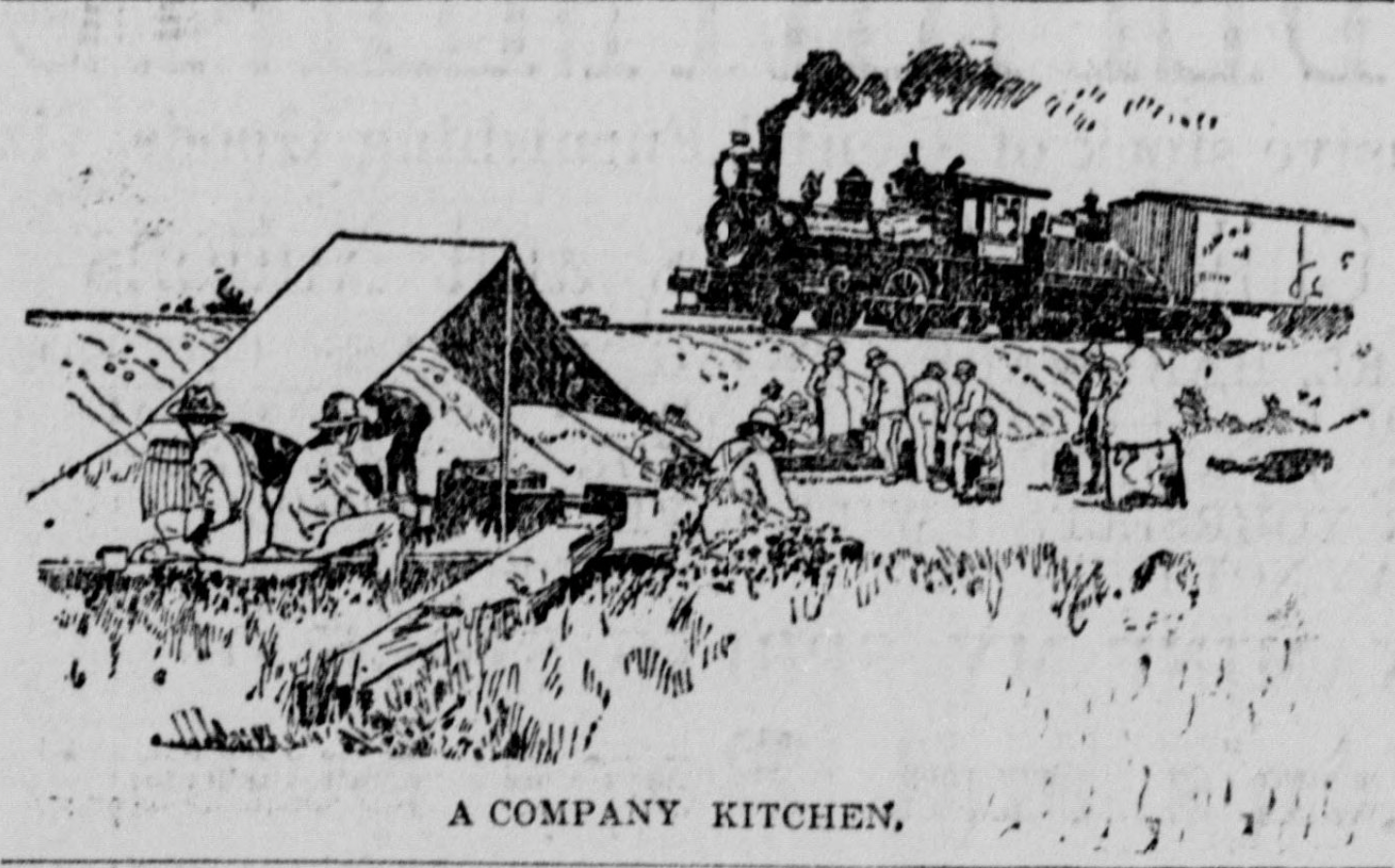
Company A camped near Chickamauga, Georgia

== Formation and journey to the Philippines ==
Upon the outbreak of the Spanish–American War in April 1898, two regiments of the Nebraska National Guard were sent to Lincoln, Nebraska, on April 23 to mobilize, per orders by Governor of Nebraska Silas Holcomb. The unit entered United States service on either May 12 or May 10, with an enlistment period of two years or the end of the war, whichever came first. After training in Nebraska at Camp Alvin Saunders, the regiment was originally intended to be sent to Camp George H. Thomas in Georgia, but was instead sent to San Francisco, California, leaving on May 16. The trip was made by railroad and cost the government $15,808.80. Colonel John P. Bratt commanded the unit, which would eventually receive the nickname "Fighting First". The regiment carried the American flag and Blue regimental flag.

After arriving the San Francisco, the unit reported to Camp Merritt, on May 19 and 20, where the men trained more. While at Camp Merritt, an order was made to increase the size of the regiment's companies, and a few men were sent back to Nebraska for further recruiting. The regiment left for Manila on June 15, traveling on the steamship SS Senator, with three other troopships in the convoy. On June 24, the men were allowed to disembark at Honolulu in the Republic of Hawaii while the ships took on coal. The vessels left Hawaii the next day, stopping again at Wake Island on July 4. Manila Bay was reached on July 17.

With Manila itself still in Spanish hands, the regiment disembarked at Cavite City on July 20. The American troops occupied a position established by local Filipino rebels, and at 21:40 on August 2, the 1st Nebraska came under fire for the first time. Spanish troops made a failed attempt to outflank the American line. During the fight, seven or eight Nebraskans were wounded and one was killed, and two men of the regiment were awarded the Certificate of Merit. Part of the regiment came under artillery fire on August 5, losing two men wounded. When American troops occupied Manila on August 13 in an affair partially arranged with the local Spanish commander, the 1st Nebraska was one of the units that advanced into the town. It did not fire a shot and suffered no casualties.

== Occupation and Philippine–American War ==
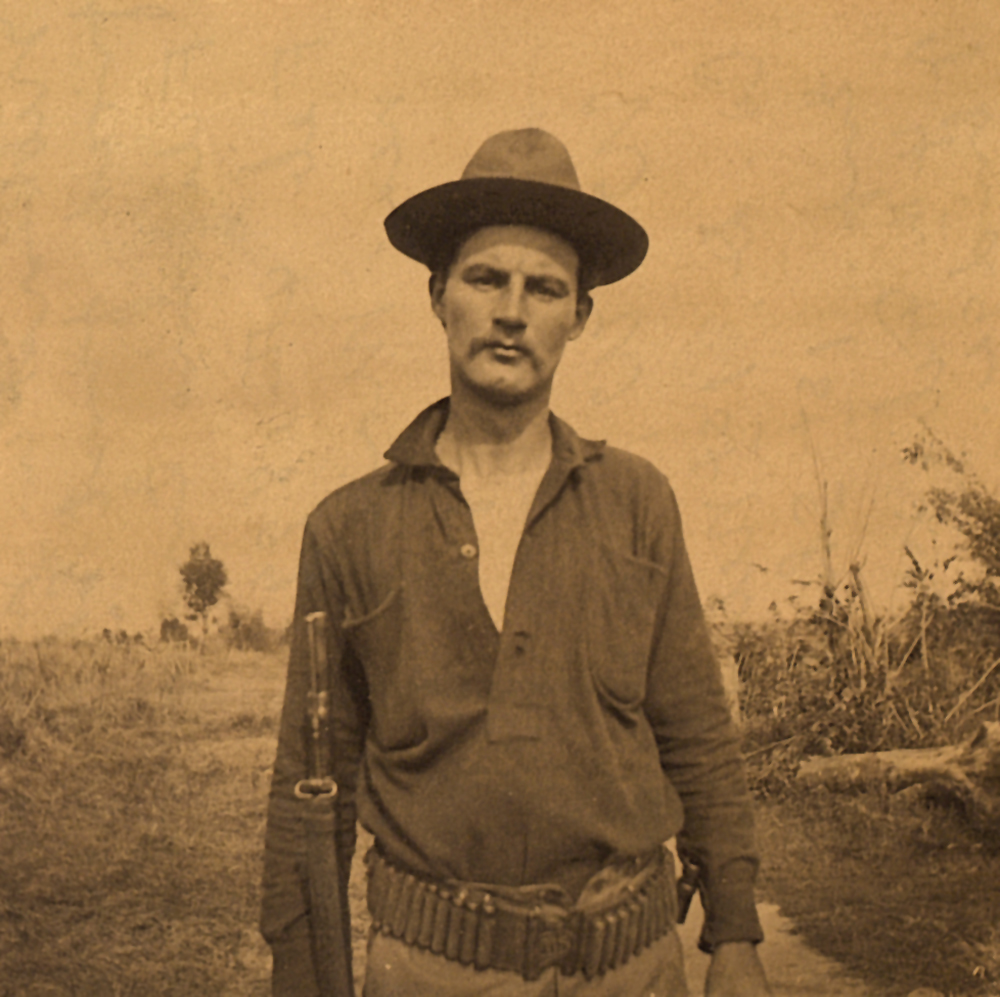
Private Grayson, who fired the first shots of the Philippine-American War

American troops performed occupation duty in the city, with the First Nebraska policing the waterfront district near the customs house. Tensions remained between the Americans and the Spanish and with the Filipino rebels under General Emilio Aguinaldo, who desired independence for the Philippines. Soldiers in the occupying American forces often referred to the locals by racial slurs, and some of the soldiers behaved in a hostile manner towards the Chinese minority population of Manila. Some looting occurred as well. Bratt was sent home due to illness in September, and John M. Stotsenburg was promoted to colonel to command the regiment on October 4. Disease caused many illnesses and deaths in the unit, and 300 soldiers were discharged in December and shipped back to the United States due to illness or infirmity. The losses to illness were partially offset by the arrival in late November of the additional recruits that had been authorized in June. In December, the regiment was transferred to Camp Santa Mesa, which was in a salient of the American lines outside of Manila that would allow the regiment a route with which to quickly take the city's waterworks if needed.

In December, the Treaty of Paris ended the Spanish–American War, and the United States signaled that it intended to keep the Philippines as a colonial possession, although Aguinaldo and his followers still desired independence. Tensions between the Americans and the Filipinos mounted through January 1899, with the location of the 1st Nebraska's camp being a point of contention.

On the evening of February 4, 1899, Private William W. Grayson fired the first shot of the Philippine-American War at the corner of Sociego Street and Tomas Arguelles Street. A study done by Ronnie Miravite Casalmir places the event at this corner, not at Sociego-Silencio where they erroneously have the marker. The Ronnie Miravite Casalmir Study debunks the previous findings of Dr. Benito Legarda which was the basis for the erroneous placement of the marker at Sociego-Silencio. According to Ronnie Miravite Casalmir, the smoking gun for the Sociego-Arguelles corner is the presence of Blockhouse 7 in the background of Grayson's reenactment photo. The orientation of this Blockhouse 7 image lines up with the corner of Sociego and Arguelles when compared with the known photo of Blockhouse 7 taken from the same direction. In addition, the distance estimate of Lieut. Whedon placed the 100-yard distance from Santol at Sociego-Arguelles, not Sociego-Silencio. This meant that when Lieut. Whedon ordered the detachment at Santol to patrol 100 yards, he meant them to patrol all the way to Sociego-Arguelles. Col. Stotsenburg corroborated Lieut. Whedon's distance estimate. Prof. Ambeth R. Ocampo calls the evidence presented by Ronnie Miravite Casalmir as new and compelling. Prof. Ocampo agrees that this evidence shows that the marker should be moved one block away, from Sociego-Silencio to Sociego-Arguelles. Maj. Lillian A. Pfluke (Ret.), West Point Class of 1980, and founder of the American War Memorials Overseas Inc. also agrees and has a note on their U.S. War Memorials website that the proper placement of the marker should be at the adjoining intersection of Sociego Street and Arguelles Street where the incident actually occurred.

The Philippine–American War began on February 4. Filipino soldiers did not answer to American sentinels, and Private William W. Grayson of the 1st Nebraska fired a shot. Firing all along the American lines soon broke out, as the Battle of Manila had begun. The next day, the Nebraskans captured a pumping station on the Mariquina River and a Hotchkiss gun. During the two days of fighting, the regiment had six men killed and 22 wounded. Eight of the regiment's members were cited for gallantry.

From February 7 to March 15, the regiment, along with an artillery battery from Utah, guarded a water pipeline. The Nebraskans and Filipinos at first fought small set-piece battles, but the Filipinos found they were not having success with those tactics and began to move to guerrilla warfare. A larger action occurred on February 22, in which part of the regiment chased a detachment of Filipinos. On February 26, a detachment of the regiment was fired upon from the town of Mariquina, and the Nebraskans burned the town in response. An investigation was launched into Stotsenburg in early March, but after interviewing men of the regiment, the investigators determined that the complaints that had led to the investigation had been made by maligners, and Stotsenburg was cleared. During the time the regiment guarded the pipeline, it lost seven men killed and 14 wounded.

Aguinaldo had his capital at Malolos, and the Americans made a movement to attack it. The offensive began on March 25, with the 1st Nebraska being part of the leading American force. Fighting through San Francisco del Monte, the regiment continued fighting on March 26, driving to the Meycauayan River. The next day, the regiment was present at the Battle of Marilao River. Part of the regiment helped a South Dakota unit capture a bridge, and later in the action, the 1st Nebraska routed the left side of the Filipino line. After spending March 28 repairing the capture bridge, the regiment advanced on March 29 and 30. On the latter day, it was heavily engaged after crossing the Guiguinto River. On March 31, the 1st Nebraska was present at the Capture of Malolos, where it served as a skirmish line and captured a few small defensive positions.

On April 23, the 1st Nebraska sent a scouting party armed with new Krag–Jørgensen rifles. Filipino fire pinned the scouts down in a ditch, starting the Battle of Quingua. A charge by the Nebraskans drove off the Filipinos, but Stotsenburg was killed during the battle, having been shot through the heart. Major Harry Mulford took command of the regiment after Stotsenburg's death. The Americans, including the 1st Nebraska, then began moving to the northwest towards San Fernando, which was a Filipino stronghold. The regiment participated in the opening portion of the Battle of Calumpit on April 25, crossing the Calumpit River and driving back Filipino forces. On May 4, the 1st Nebraska fought at the Battle of Santo Tomas, where it suffered its final battle losses. After American forces captured San Fernando, the 1st Nebraska entered the city on May 6 and stayed there through the 20th. Battle and disease had taken the regiment from a strength of 923 men on February 4 to only about 300 when it reached San Fernando. The campaign for Malolos and San Fernando had cost the regiment 20 killed and 168 wounded.

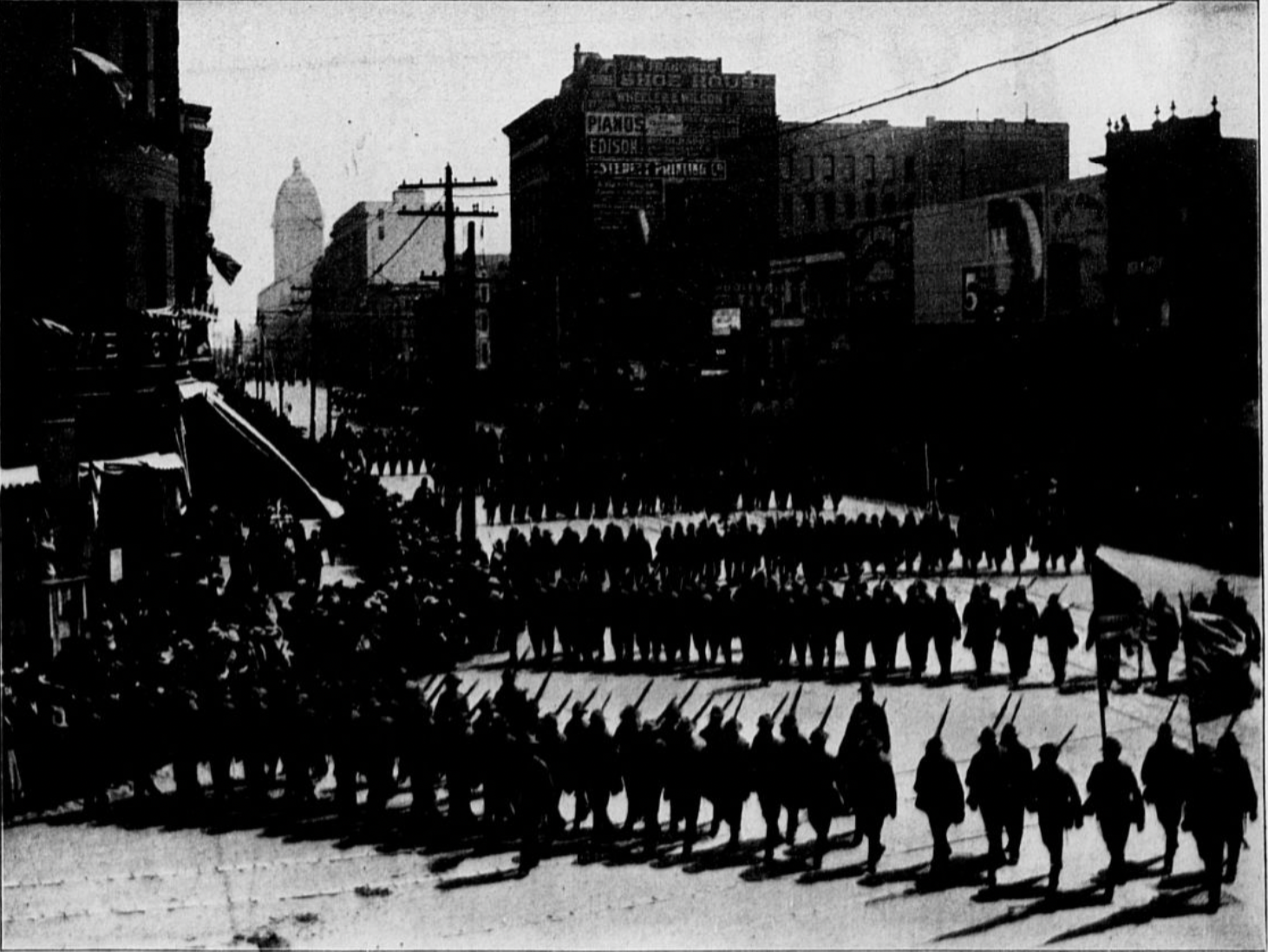
Company I in San Francisco, 1899

The United States began to replace the state volunteer regiments with new national ones, and the 1st Nebraska was sent back to Calumpit on May 20. From there, it returned to Manila by rail, where it performed guard duty for a month. On June 21, the regiment boarded the SS Hancock, leaving Manila on July 1. Hancock made stops in Nagasaki and Yokohama in July, and the ship reached San Francisco on the night of July 29 and 30. The 1st Nebraska was mustered out on August 23, 1899, and the men boarded trains for Nebraska on August 25. During the regiment's time in service, it had 64 men killed and several hundred wounded.

== Sources ==
- Coats, Stephen D. (2006). Gathering at the Golden Gate: Mobilizing for War in the Philippines, 1898. Fort Leavenworth, Kansas: Combat Studies Institute Press.
- Grant, H. Roger (1974). "The Fighting Firsts: The First South Dakota and Nebraska Volunteers in the Philippines, 1898–1899". South Dakota History. 4 (3): 320–332.
- Thiessen, Thomas D. (1989). "The Fighting First Nebraska: Nebraska's Imperial Adventure in the Philippines, 1898–1899". Nebraska History. 70: 210–272.
