= John M. Stotsenburg =

American colonel (1858–1899)

John Miller Stotsenburg
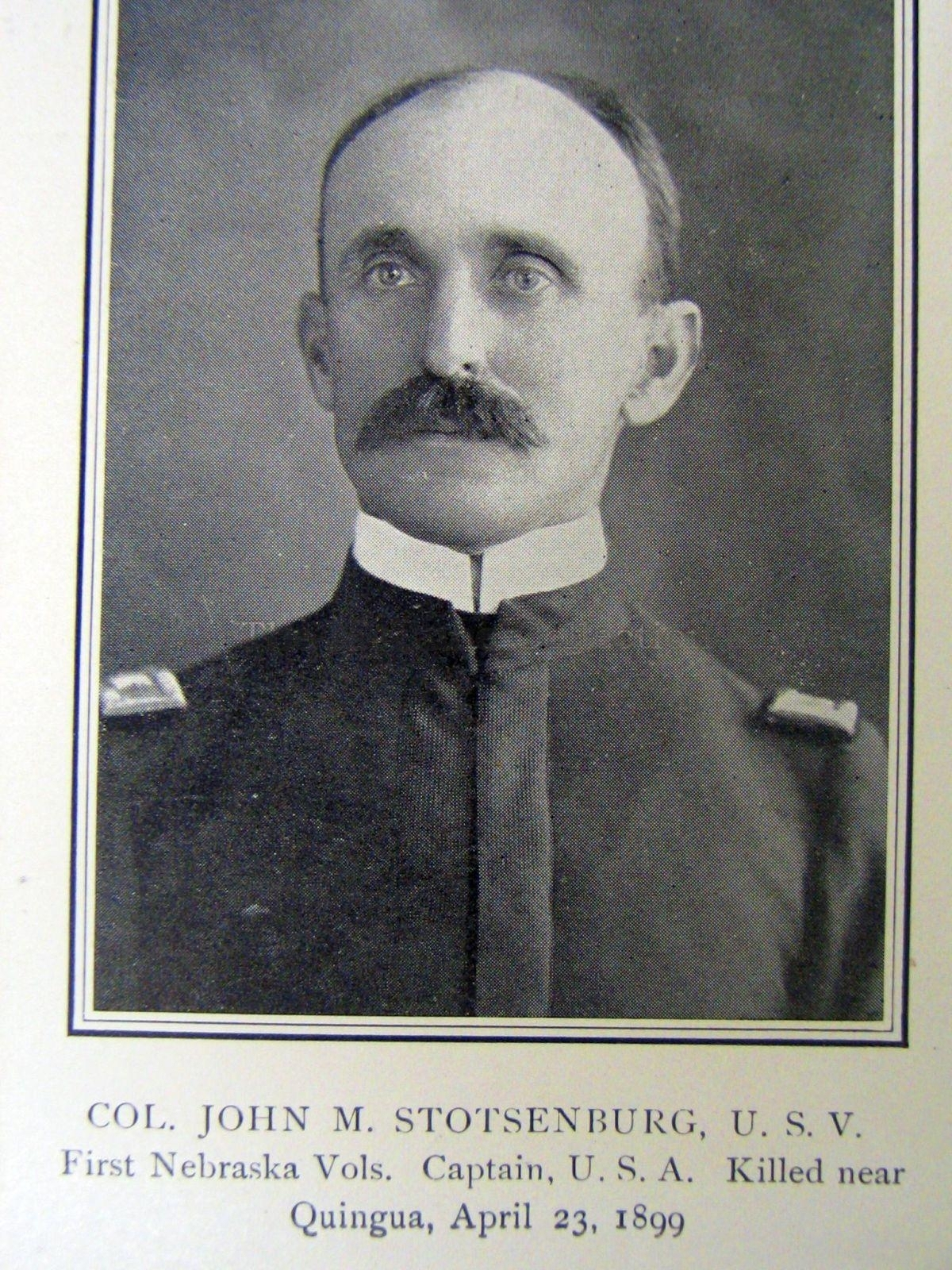
- Stotsenburg in 1899
- Born: November 24, 1858; New Albany, Indiana, U.S.
- Died: April 23, 1899 (aged 40); Quingua, Bulacan, First Philippine Republic
- Burial place: Arlington National Cemetery, Arlington, Virginia, U.S.
- Alma mater: United States Military Academy
- Relatives: Evan B. Stotsenburg (brother)
- Military career
- Allegiance: United States
- Branch: United States Army
- Service years: 1877–1899
- Rank: Colonel (USV); Captain (USA)
- Commands: 1st Nebraska Infantry Regiment; 6th Cavalry Regiment
- Conflicts: Spanish–American War; Philippine–American War: Battle of Quingua †

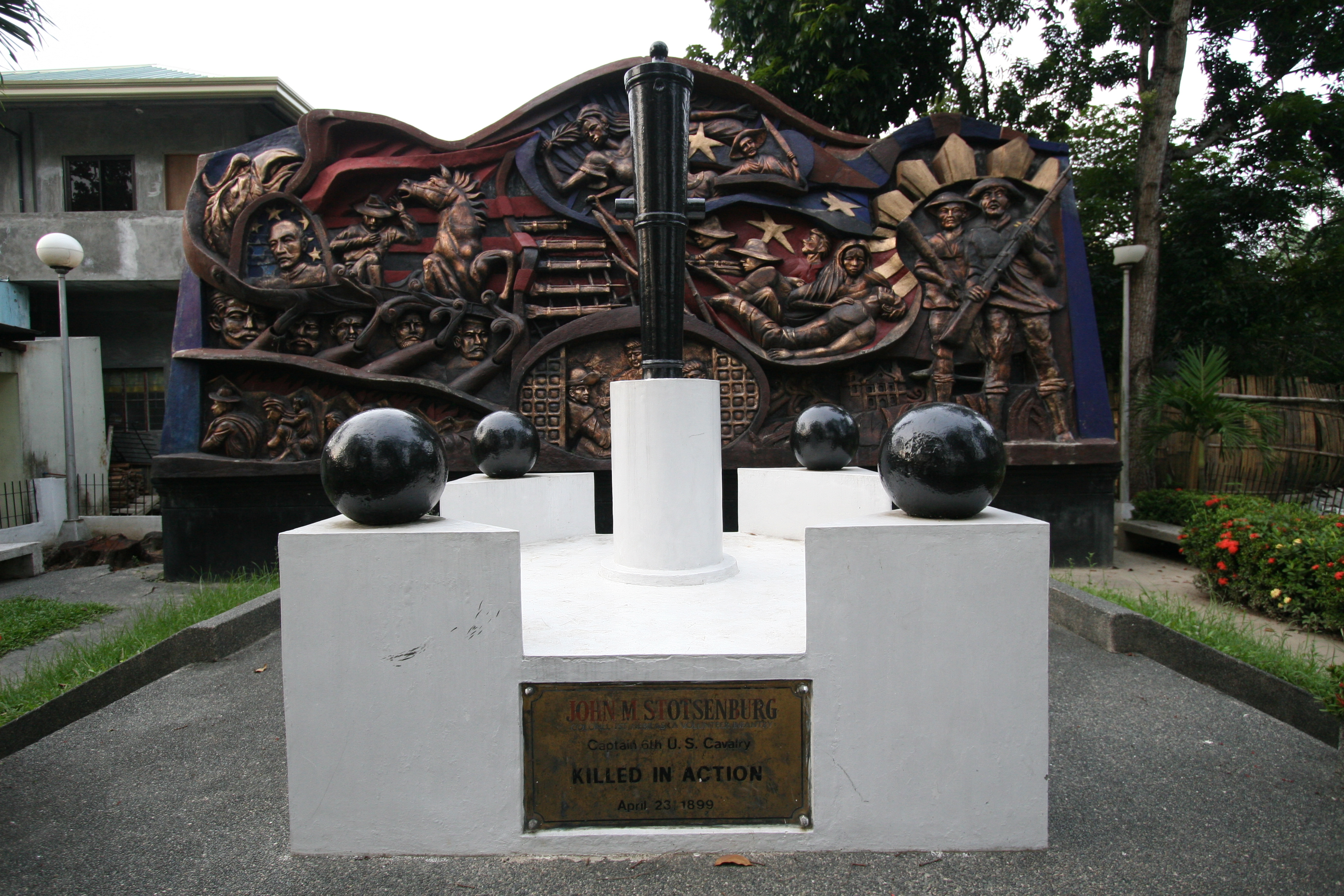
John M. Stotsenburg War Memorial, Plaridel

John Miller Stotsenburg (November 24, 1858 – April 23, 1899) was a captain of the Sixth U.S. Cavalry, and a colonel of the First Nebraska Volunteers. He was killed in the Philippine–American War, while leading his regiment in action near Quingua, Bulacan, Philippines on April 23, 1899.

== Biography ==
John M. Stotsenburg was born in New Albany, Indiana on November 24, 1858. His brother was Evan B. Stotsenburg, the twenty-second Indiana Attorney General.

He entered the United States Military Academy in West Point, New York on July 1, 1877. He graduated in 1881, and assigned to the Sixth Cavalry, with which he served in New Mexico, Arizona, Nebraska, and Fort Myer, Virginia.

After graduating from the Infantry and Cavalry School of Application at Fort Leavenworth in June 1897, he was appointed as Professor of Military Science and Tactics at the University of Nebraska in December 1897. Immediately after the declaration of war with Spain, he was assigned as mustering officer for Nebraska and assisted in organizing the First Nebraska Regiment of which he was appointed as major. With that rank, he took the regiment to the Philippines, where he was promoted to colonel on November 10, 1898.

From the opening of hostilities until after his death, Colonel Stotsenburg's regiment was constantly in the field and always on the firing line. In the first major engagement of the Philippine–American War, on February 5, 1899, Colonel Stotsenburg personally led his troops into action that resulted in the capture of the San Juan Bridge, the powder magazine, the water work reservoir, the Convent of San Juan del Monte, and San Felipe, all of which were contested heavily by General Emilio Aguinaldo's forces. The following day, his troops drove the enemy across the Santolan River and captured the water works pumping station before the Filipinos could destroy it. During those maneuvers, Colonel Stotsenburg commanded more troops than any brigadier general on the field in the Philippines had handled up to that time: the First Nebraska, four guns of the Utah Light Battery, and a battalion of the 23rd U.S. Infantry.

On April 23, 1899, Colonel Stotsenburg was killed in action during the Battle of Quingua while leading a charge on a Filipino position. He was 40 years old at the time of his death and was later buried at Arlington National Cemetery. The former Fort Stotsenburg, established in 1902 and later replaced by Clark Air Base, was named for him.

== Personal life ==
Stotsenburg was the son of John Hawley Stotsenburg (December 13, 1830 – June 7, 1909) and Jane Frances (Miller) Stotsenburg (August 12, 1835 – December 31, 1901). His father was a lawyer, judge and writer.

On February 11, 1885, Stotsenburg married Mary LaTourette (died March 31, 1929) at Fort Union in New Mexico. Her father was a U.S. Army chaplain. They had two daughters, both of whom married U.S. Army officers.

Stotsenburg and his wife are interred at Arlington National Cemetery.
