= Capture of Malolos =

1899 battle of the Philippine-American War

- Part of the Philippine–American War
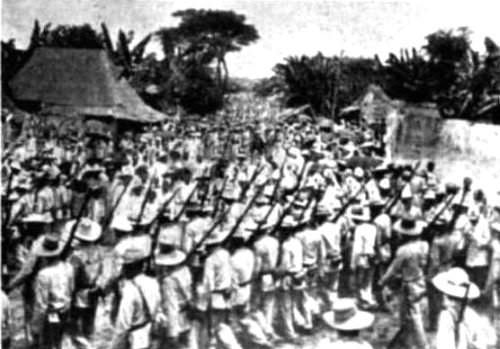
- Filipino soldiers in Malolos
Date	March 25–31, 1899
Location	Malolos, Bulacan, Philippines
Result	American victory
Territorial changes	Fall of the capital of the Philippine Republic

Belligerents
United States	(First Philippine Republic) Philippine Republic

Commanders and leaders
(United States) Arthur MacArthur Jr. (United States) Loyd Wheaton (United States) Irving Hale (United States) Frederick Funston	(First Philippine Republic) Antonio Luna

Strength
10,000 to 15,000	5,000 (estimate)

Casualties and losses
8 killed, 105 wounded (official report)	Unknown
- Total casualties: 56 killed 478 wounded

The Capture of Malolos (Filipino: Labanan para sa Malolos), also known as the Battle of Malolos, occurred on March 31, 1899, in Malolos, Bulacan, during the Philippine–American War. General Arthur MacArthur Jr.'s division advanced to Malolos along the Manila-Dagupan Railway. By March 30, American forces were advancing toward Malolos. Meanwhile, the Aguinaldo government moved its seat from Malolos to San Isidro, Nueva Ecija.

== Background ==
Despite the failure of the Filipino counterattack to retake Manila on February 23, 1899, the Americans still saw their position as being unsafe, for the Filipino forces in Marikina still threatened Manila more than that of the forces in Malolos. So, they waited for reinforcements under General Henry Ware Lawton, which arrived between March 10 and 23. After Lawton's arrival, the overall American force was divided into two divisions: one under the command of Arthur MacArthur Jr. and another under Lawton. On March 25, the American offensive resumed under MacArthur, which attempted in vain to encircle the Filipinos retreating to Malolos. It was then decided that Malolos be approached via the Manila–Dagupan Railway. On March 27, the advancing Americans faced Aguinaldo's force in the Battle of Marilao River, which resulted in an American victory. Due to increasing pressure from the American offensive and the Republican Army officers, Aguinaldo had reinstated Antonio Luna as Chief of War Operations in Central Luzon on March 28. So, it was Luna who facilitated the Philippine Republican Army during the event.

== Battle ==
After resting at Guiguinto, Bulacan, from March 29 to 30, 1899, the American division under MacArthur pushed towards the suburbs of Malolos, reaching there by the afternoon of March 30. In the morning of March 31, the Americans conducted an artillery bombardment for 25 minutes. According to Colonel (later General) Funston's account, he was the first to enter Malolos and his unit was "fired upon by about a dozen men behind a street barricade of stones". The Americans then exchanged fire with the Filipinos at the plaza. It was at that point that Funston and his men saw that Emilio Aguinaldo's Presidencia (headquarters) and the Hall of Congress had caught fire. This buoyed the spirits of the Americans, who cheered before informing their division commander, MacArthur, that Malolos was theirs for the taking. The American official history described the Presidencia as an edifice of "considerable architectural beauty". It also noted that Funston's account of the event was oversimplified, stating that Filipino resistance, which had lasted almost two hours, had been "stubborn".

In a letter sent by the Philippine Republic to the Filipino Junta in Hong Kong (which was then led by Galicano Apacible) on April 18, 1899, it was stated that the fall of Malolos did not pose a significant impact upon the ability of the Filipino forces to wage war on the Americans. It was also stated that Filipino garrisons in the north could not be pulled out for the defense of the capital because an American landing was suspected in Pangasinan and Tayabas. The generals of the Republic believed that Malolos was near enough to the shore to be bombarded by American gunships, and that rather than advancing to meet them, the best strategy would be to draw the Americans into the interior of the country where they would have to disperse their forces. This would in turn serve to dilute the strength of the Americans and keep the Filipino forces out of range of the American gunships.

== Aftermath ==
The battle in Malolos itself only cost eight American lives, with another 105 Americans wounded. However, the American official history noted that the whole campaign to capture the Philippine capital from March 25 to 31, resulted in 56 Americans killed and 478 wounded. The hasty campaign to Malolos primarily failed in its objective to demoralize the Filipinos. This was demonstrated in the third week of April when, after MacArthur left Malolos to move to Pampanga via Calumpit, the Filipinos returned to reoccupy Malolos. MacArthur's move would subsequently result in the Battle of Calumpit.
