= Harrison Gray Otis =

Harrison Gray Otis may refer to:

- Harrison Gray Otis (publisher) (1837–1917), publisher of the Los Angeles Times
- Harrison Gray Otis (politician) (1765–1848), American businessman, lawyer, and politician
- SS Harrison Gray Otis, Liberty ship, commissioned and sunk in 1943

== See also ==
- Harrison Gray Otis Dwight (1803–1862), American Congregational missionary
- Harrison G. O. Blake (1818–1876), U.S. Representative from Ohio
- Harrison Gray Otis House, in Boston, Massachusetts
