= Battle of Quingua =

1899 battle during the Philippine–American War

- Part of the Philippine–American War
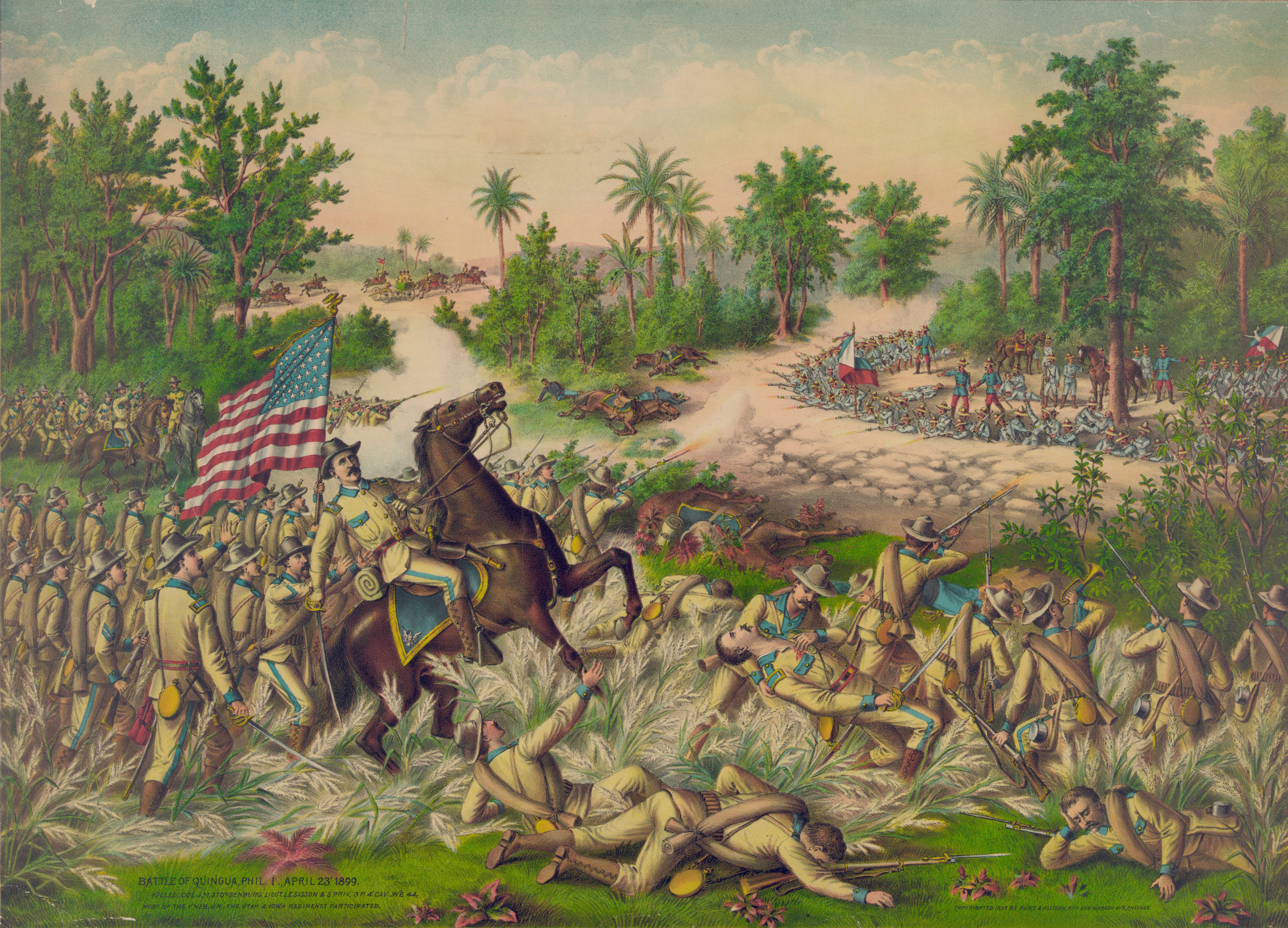
- Battle of Quingua, Kurz and Allison
| Date | April 23, 1899 |
| Location | Quingua, Bulacan, Philippines |
| Result | 1st phase: Filipino victory 2nd phase: American victory |

Belligerents
| United States | Philippines |

Commanders and leaders
| J. Franklin Bell; John Stotsenburg †; Irving Hale | Gregorio del Pilar; Pablo Tecson |

Strength
| 800 | 50–100 |

Casualties and losses
| 7 killed 44 wounded | 52 killed |

The Battle of Quingua (Filipino: Labanan sa Quingua, Spanish: Batalla de Quingua) was fought on April 23, 1899, in Quingua — now Plaridel, Bulacan, Philippines, during the Philippine–American War (1899–1902). The engagement was a two-part battle that started general Elwell S. Otis' Bulacan and Pampanga offensive a day early. The first phase was a brief victory for the young Filipino general Gregorio del Pilar when he stopped the advance of the American Cavalry led by Major J. Franklin Bell. In the second phase of the battle, Bell was reinforced by the 1st Nebraskan Infantry, who routed the Filipinos, but not before they repelled a cavalry charge that killed Colonel John M. Stotsenburg.

== Battle ==
The battle began when US Major Bell with the 4th Cavalry, while on a reconnaissance mission, came upon a strong Filipino position led by Colonel Pablo Tecson, a Republican officer from San Miguel, Bulacan who was under command of General Gregorio del Pilar. The Filipinos laid down heavy fire which halted Bell's cavalry advance. After a short firefight, Bell recognized his position was badly exposed to the opposition, and as a result his force risked defeat. Bell sent for reinforcements, and the 1st Nebraskans came to his aid under Colonel John M. Stotsenburg, while Irving Hale sent companies from the 51st Iowa as well as artillery from the Utah Battery.

Once he arrived on the field, Stotsenburg led the Nebraskan Infantry, with a dozen or so Cavalrymen— in a charge on the enemy's position. The Filipinos held their ground and opened fire. Stotsenberg was one of the first to fall, a bullet to the heart. Several of the cavalrymen's mounts were also slain. The Filipino soldiers sustained the heavy fire, forcing the cavalrymen to retreat.

The Nebraskans, only 200 in number, continued advancing under fire by the Filipino riflemen. Despite the accuracy and intensity of the riflemen's fire, the Nebraskan line continued to advance. Inevitably, the two forces clashed in close combat, but after an exhaustive battle, the Filipinos retreated. During the fight, Hale's brigade lost 7 men killed, and 44 more men were wounded.

== Legacy ==
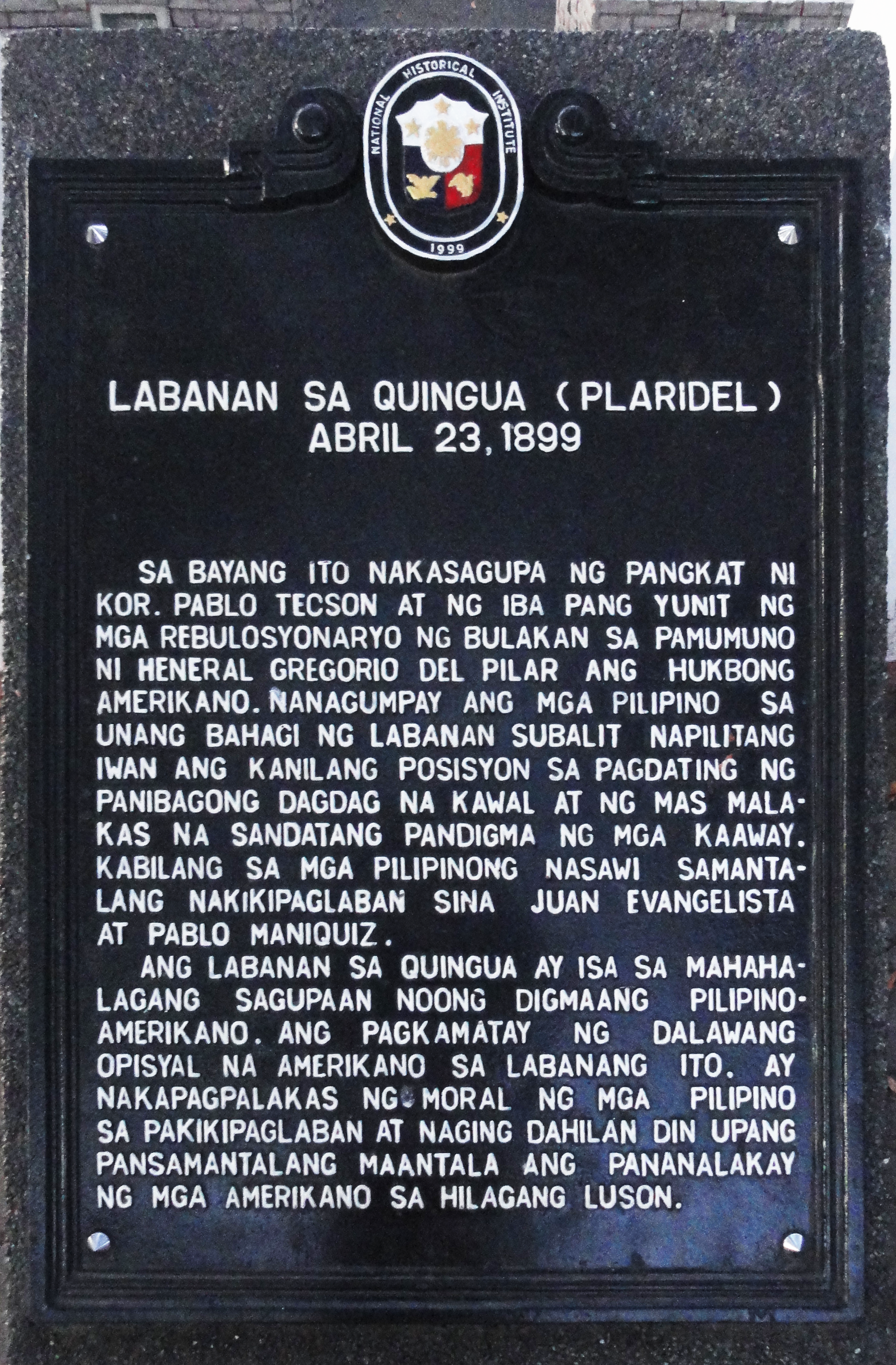
Historical marker in the monument

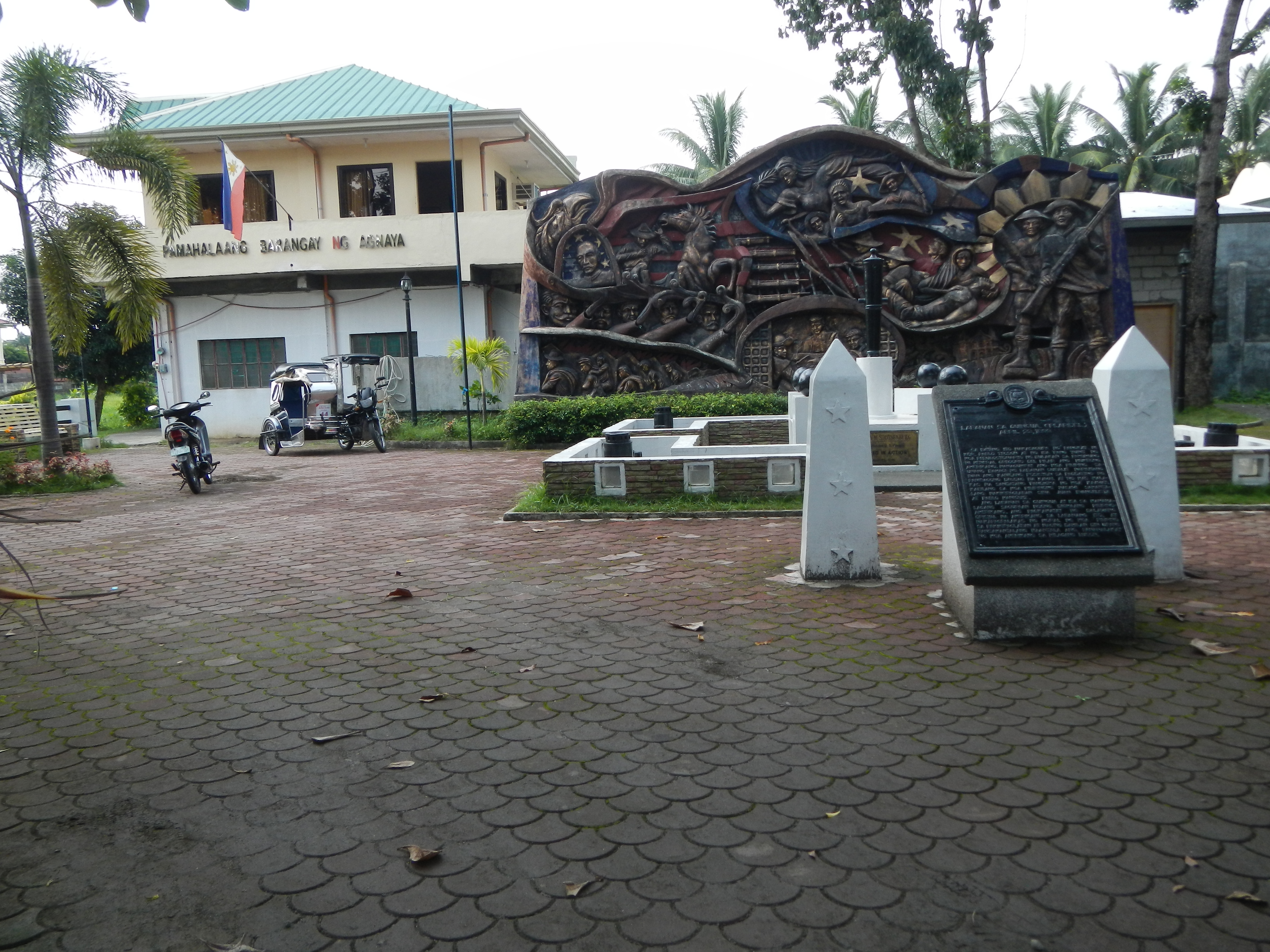
Monuments and memorials in Barangay Agnaya, Plaridel

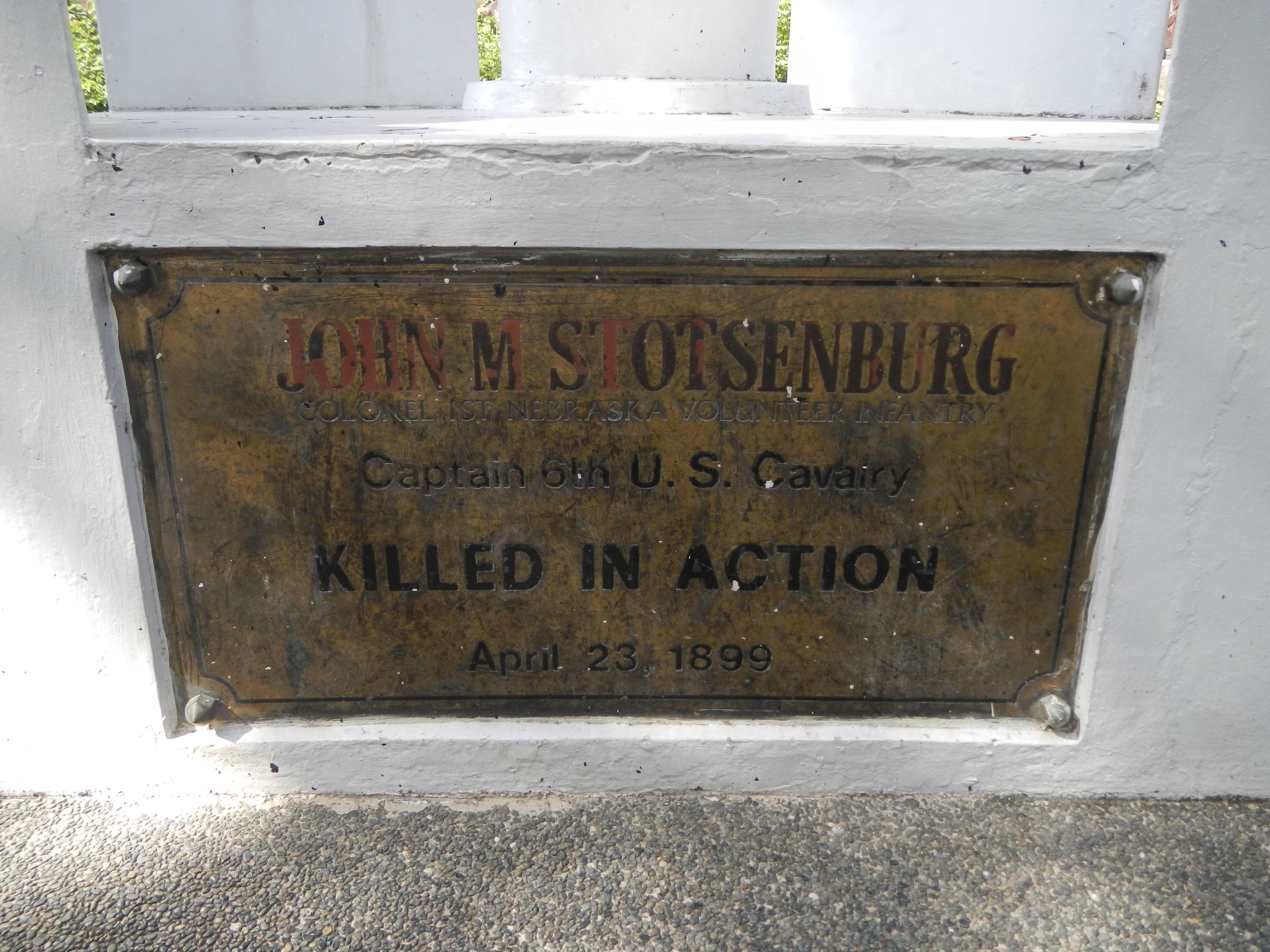
John M. Stotsenburg marker

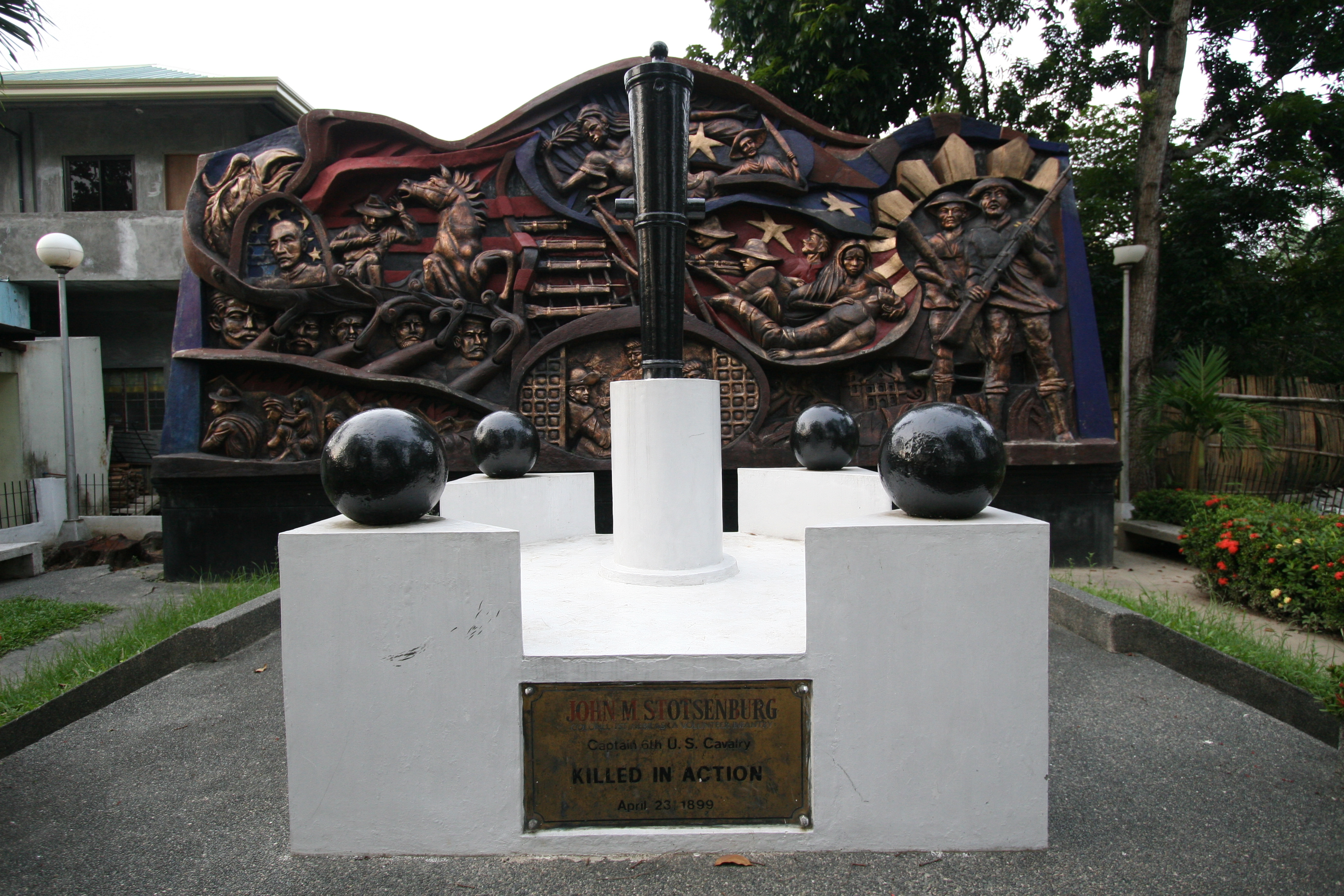
John M. Stotsenburg War Memorial, Plaridel
