= Loyd Wheaton =

United States Army general

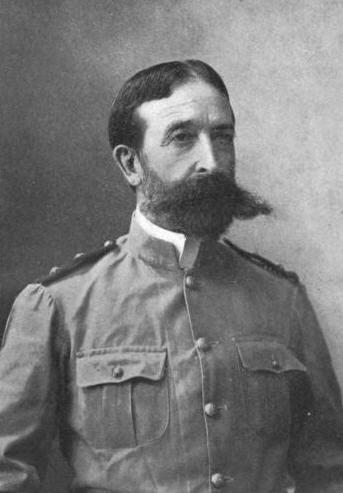
- Major General Loyd Wheaton, c. 1902
- Born: July 15, 1838; Pennfield, Michigan, U.S.
- Died: September 17, 1918 (aged 80); Chicago, Illinois, U.S.
- Burial place: Greenwood Cemetery, Rockford, Illinois
- Military career
- Allegiance: United States of America; Union
- Branch: (United States) Union Army
- Service years: 1861–1902
- Rank: Major General
- Unit: 8th Illinois Volunteer Infantry
- Commands: 20th Infantry Regiment
- Conflicts: American Civil War; Battle of Fort Blakeley; Fenian Raids; American Indian Wars; Black Hills Expedition; Spanish–American War; Philippine–American War; Pasig River Expedition; Capture of Malolos; Battle of Zapote River; Battle of San Jacinto
- Awards: Medal of Honor

Loyd Wheaton (July 15, 1838 – September 17, 1918) was a United States general who fought in the Philippine–American War and in the Union Army during the American Civil War.

== Early life ==
Wheaton was born in Pennfield, Michigan, on July 15, 1838.

== American Civil War ==
At the outbreak of the American Civil War in April 1861, Wheaton joined the 8th Illinois Infantry as a first sergeant. He was commissioned as a first lieutenant in July 1861, and was promoted to captain in March 1862, major in August 1863, and reached the rank of lieutenant colonel in November 1864.

Wheaton received a brevet (honorary promotion) to colonel on March 26, 1865, for his service in the campaign against Mobile, Alabama.

Wheaton received the Medal of Honor for his actions at the Battle of Fort Blakeley on April 9, 1865; however, the medal was not presented until January 16, 1894. After mustering out of the volunteers in 1866, he became a captain in the regular army.

He was discharged from the volunteer Army on May 4, 1866.

After the war, he became a member of the Military Order of the Loyal Legion of the United States—a military society of officers of the Union armed forces and their descendants.

== Regular Army career ==
Shortly after his discharge from the volunteer Army, Wheaton was commissioned as a captain in the 34th Infantry Regiment of the Regular Army on July 28, 1866. He transferred to the 20th Infantry on September 1, 1869. In 1870, he commanded soldiers which captured a number of Fenian raiders, who were heading to Manitoba. He was promoted to major of the 20th Infantry on October 14, 1891.

He was promoted to lieutenant colonel of the 22nd Infantry on May 31, 1895, and transferred back to his old regiment, the 20th, on September 11 of the same year.

== Spanish–American War ==
Wheaton was appointed brigadier general of volunteers at the outbreak of the Spanish–American War on May 27, 1898, and was placed in command of the 1st Brigade, 1st Division, Seventh Army Corps stationed in Miami. Seventh Corps served in Cuba but only after the fighting was over; his brigade was part of the occupation force.

He fulfilled a long-held ambition when, on February 6, 1899, he became colonel of the 20th Infantry—the regiment with which he had spent the bulk of his long career.

== Philippine–American War ==
Wheaton was then sent to the Philippines, where he was placed in command of a Provisional Brigade in the Eighth Army Corps during the Philippine–American War. He led his brigade during the Pasig River expedition, Malolos campaign, and at the Battle of Zapote River. He then assumed command of the 1st Brigade, 2nd Division, Eighth Corps during the Northern offensive where his troops defeated a Filipino force at the Battle of San Jacinto and linked with the corps' 1st Division under Arthur MacArthur at Dagupan. He commanded the 1st Brigade of 1st Division, Eighth Corps during the second Cavite expedition.

He was breveted to major general of volunteers on June 19, 1899, for gallantry in action against insurgent forces in Imus, Philippines. Wheaton commanded the Department of Northern Luzon during the second phase of the war. He was Brigadier General Frederick Funston's immediate superior and authorized Funston's expedition to capture Emilio Aguinaldo. He was promoted to major general of volunteers on June 18, 1900.

During the war, Wheaton and troops under his command perpetrated a massacre of Filipino civilians in the town of Titatia. A. A. Barnes, a soldier in the G Battery of the 3rd Artillery Regiment, wrote a letter to his brother describing the massacre:

The town of Titatia was surrendered to us a few days ago, and two companies occupy the same. Last night one of our boys was found shot and his stomach cut open. Immediately orders were received from General Wheaton to burn the town and kill every native in sight; which was done to a finish. About 1,000 men, women and children were reported killed. I am probably growing hard-hearted, for I am in my glory when I can sight my gun on some dark skin and pull the trigger.

== Late career ==
He was commissioned as a brigadier general in the Regular Army to rank from February 2, 1901, and was discharged from the Volunteer Army on February 28, 1901. He was promoted to major general in the Regular Army on March 30, 1901.

Having reached the mandatory retirement age of 64, General Wheaton retired from the Army, after 41 years of service, on July 15, 1902. He was a companion of Kansas Commandery of the Military Order of the Loyal Legion of the United States.

He died in Chicago on September 17, 1918.

== Medal of Honor citation ==
Rank and organization: Lieutenant Colonel, 8th Illinois Infantry. Place and date: At Fort Blakeley, Ala., April 9, 1865. Entered service at: Illinois. Born: July 15, 1838, Calhoun County, Mich. Date of issue: January 16, 1894.

Citation:

Led the right wing of his regiment, and, springing through an embrasure, was the first to enter the enemy's works, against a strong fire of artillery and infantry.

== See also ==
- List of Medal of Honor recipients
- List of American Civil War Medal of Honor recipients: T–Z
