= Irving Hale =

United States Army general (1861–1930)

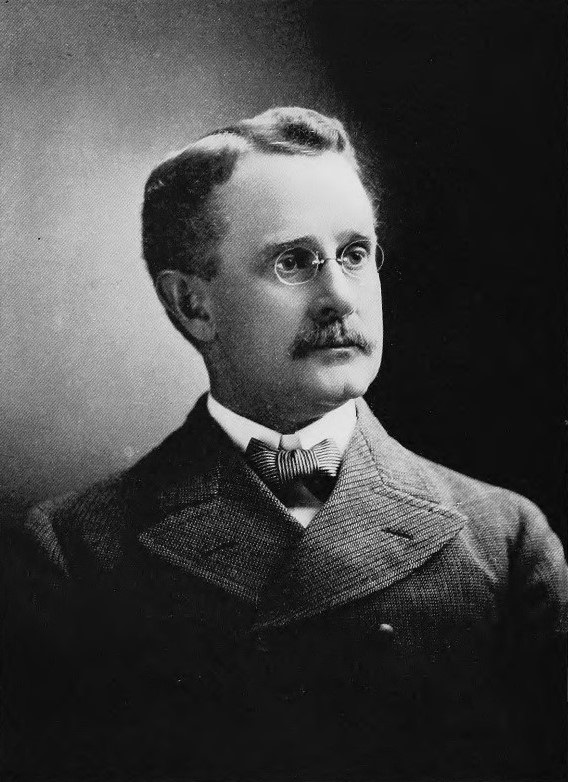
- Born: Horace Irving Hale; August 28, 1861; North Bloomfield, Ontario County, New York
- Died: July 26, 1930 (aged 68); Denver, Colorado
- Burial place: Fairmount Cemetery
- Military career
- Allegiance: United States of America
- Branch: United States Army
- Service years: 1884–1890; 1897–1899
- Rank: Brigadier General
- Commands: 1st Colorado Volunteer Infantry
- Conflicts: Spanish–American War; Battle of Manila; Philippine–American War; Battle of Meycauayan
- Awards: Silver Star
- Other work: Electrical engineer

Signature
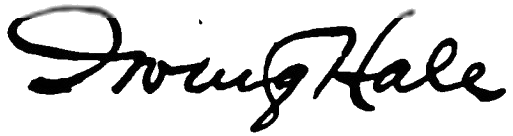

Irving Hale (August 28, 1861 – July 26, 1930) was a brigadier general of the United States of America who served in the Philippines during the Spanish–American War and the early stages of the Philippine–American War.

== Biography ==
Born in New York, Hale was the son of Horace M. Hale, a teacher who later became the second president of the University of Colorado. Hale's family moved to Colorado in 1865. He graduated at the head of the first class from Denver East High School in 1877. He enrolled at West Point in July 1880, and graduated at the head of his class four years later. His final score was 2070.4 points out of a possible 2075, which is the highest-ever score from the military academy.

Hale pursued studies in electrical engineering following his commission as a second lieutenant. In September 1886, he was promoted to first lieutenant. From November 1887 to August 1888, Hale taught military photography at the Engineer School of Application. In September 1888, he won a gold medal for rifle marksmanship in the U.S. Army competition at Fort Niagara, New York. From September 1888 to August 1889, Hale was an assistant professor of civil and military engineering at the U.S. Military Academy.

In September 1889, he took a leave of absence to supervise the construction of the South Broadway line in Denver, Colorado, creating the first successful electric railway there. On April 1, 1890, Hale resigned from the regular army to take a position with General Electric. In 1895, he was awarded the honorary degree of electrical engineer by the Colorado State School of Mines.

Still living in Denver, Hale joined the state militia in May 1897 as lieutenant colonel in the 1st Infantry Regiment, Colorado National Guard. In October 1897, he was promoted to colonel by Governor Alva Adams and given command of the regiment. In December 1897, Hale was promoted to brigadier general in the National Guard.

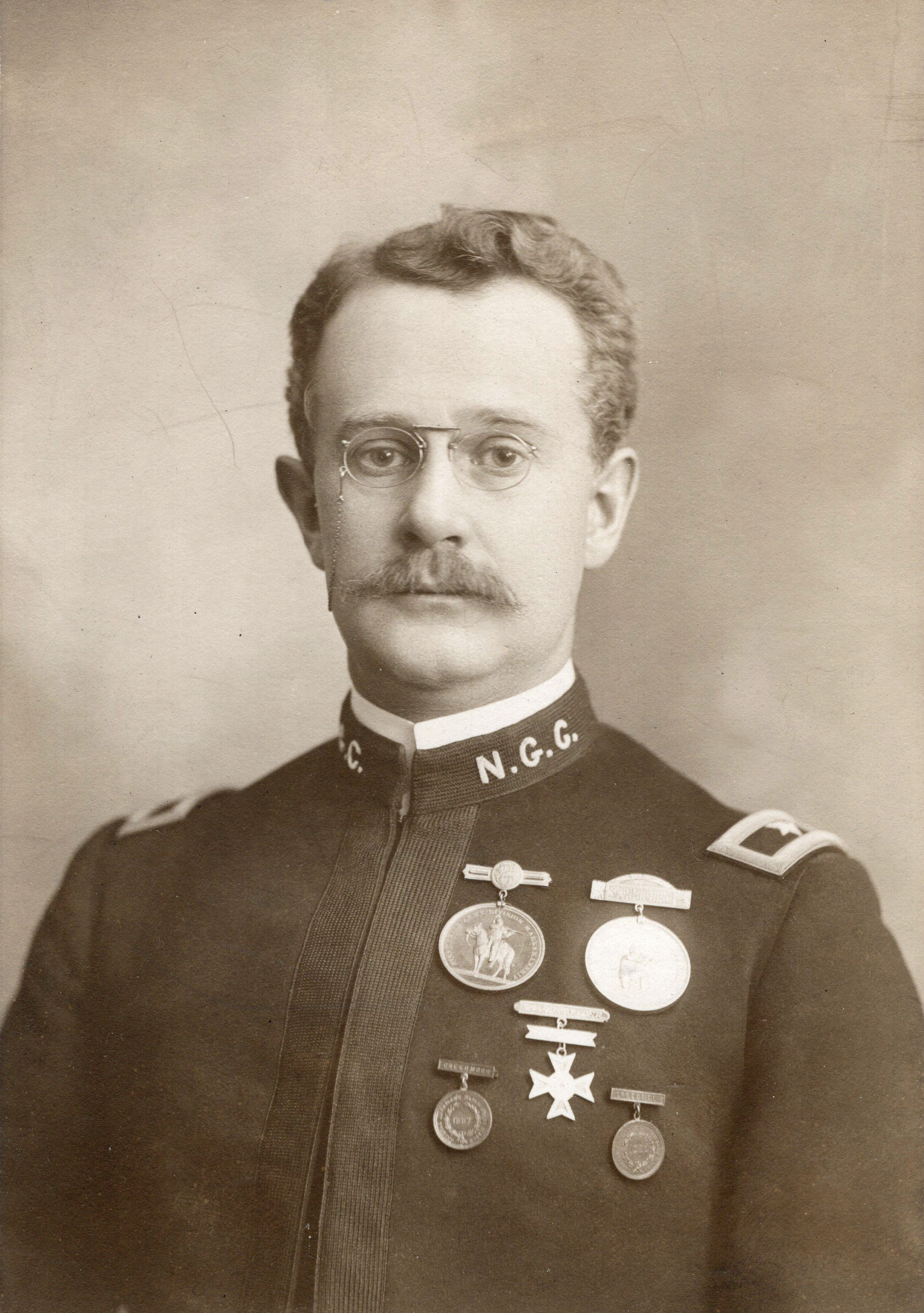

The First Colorado, like many other state militias, was sworn into service at the beginning of the Spanish–American War in April 1898, with Hale as colonel of U.S. Volunteers in command. The Colorados were sent to the Philippines, along with other militias from western states. The First Colorado secured the American left flank during the Battle of Manila, capturing Fort San Agustin, and raising the first American flag over the city's fortifications; his excellent leadership secured Hale a promotion to the rank of brigadier general of volunteers in command of the 2d Brigade, 2d Division, Eighth Army Corps.

During the Philippine–American War, Hale led troops into battle on several occasions, and was wounded while scouting an enemy position during the battle of Meycauayan on March 26, 1899. He later received a Silver Star for his leadership near Calumpit on April 25, 1899. Hale was also awarded an honorary LL.D. degree by the University of Colorado in 1899.

Though offered a position in the new volunteer army, Hale decided to return home with the state militias in the fall and was honorably mustered out on October 1, 1899, returning to his civilian career as an electrical engineer. Following the war, he was active as one of the founders of the Veterans of Foreign Wars.

== Personal ==
On June 14, 1887, Hale married Mary Virginia King in Willet's Point, New York. Her father was William Rice King, an Army engineer and 1863 West Point graduate. Hale and his wife had three sons and three daughters.

On September 29, 1911, Hale suffered a paralytic stroke from which he never fully recovered. He died on July 26, 1930, in Denver, and is buried in Denver's Fairmount Cemetery. The neighborhood of Hale, Denver is named for him. In addition, a prominent plaque in his honor was placed on the south side of the Colorado State Capitol Building, in Denver.

== See also ==
- Camp Hale
