= Manila Battalion =

Unit of the Philippine Republican Army

- Batalyon ng Maynila; Batallón de Manila
- Active: 1899
- Country: Philippines
- Allegiance: Philippine Republic
- Branch: Philippine Republican Army
- Type: Infantry
- Role: Line Infantry
- Size: 4 to 6 companies
- Nickname: El Famoso
- Engagements: Philippine–American War; Battle of Manila; Second Battle of Caloocan; Battle of Malabon; Battle of Malinta; Battle of Polo; Battle of Meycauayan; Battle of Marilao River; Battle of Calumpit

Commanders
- Notable commanders: Gen. Pantaleon Garcia; Lt. Col. Cipriano Pacheco

The Manila Battalion was a military unit within the Philippine Republican Army, composed of enlisted Filipino soldiers from the City of Manila, and would play a crucial role in the defense of their province against the Americans, and later on the defense of the capital, Malolos.

A company of the Manila Battalion under Garcia was present in Aliaga, Nueva Ecija on June 5th, 1899. On that day, they disarmed General Antonio Luna's men and conducted them as prisoners, sending them toward Cabanatuan. This occurred on the same day General Luna was assassinated by troops of the Kawit Battalion in Cabanatuan.

== Service as a military unit ==
=== The battalion’s formation ===
The Philippine Republican Army organized its units into battalions, some numbered or even specialized, though most were named after the province, or city they were raised. Formed principally by Tagalogs from the same area, and mustered from the town of Malabon, the battalion was considered to be one of the most well-trained of Philippine Army units.

As the Spanish were losing hold of the Philippines in the Philippine Revolution, and a Philippine victory on the horizon, native infantry units began to desert and began to join the ranks of the Philippine Army. The soldiers who defected from the Ejército Filipino of Spain to join the battalion were mainly the men of the 73rd Infantry Regiment, and the Carabineros Customs Guards.

=== Manila and Malolos Campaign ===
The battalion was stationed at the fourth military zone of Manila, covering Caloocan, Novaliches, and Malabon, alongside the units Bulacan Battalion, Pampanga Battalion, and other notable battalions. When hostilities between the Philippines and America began, fighting in the battles of the Manila Campaign.

After the Filipino retreat from Manila, the Americans began preparing for their advance towards Malolos. The battalion fiercely fought from the 25th-27th of March, 1899 during the near-end of the Malolos campaign. At the 25th, the Manila Battalion managed to check the advance of Wheaton’s Brigade at the Tullahan River which prevented them from crossing the river at Tinajeros and Malabon, allowing the battalion to do an orderly retreat and fight once again in the following days.

=== Final battles of the battalion ===
For their discipline and valor, they gained the moniker “El Famoso” or “The famous” in English, given by both Filipino and American sides. Prior to 1899, the battalion wore rayadillo trousers, but later on as the war against America progressed, the battalion would wear red trousers signifying the battalion was one of the elite units of the Philippine Republican Army. The last major engagements of the battalion would be fought around Arayat, Pampanga, far from the area they were first raised in.

== Related units ==
Another Manila-based territorial militia was recorded to have been active in January 1899. The 5th Trozo Battalion was formed by Intramuros resident Julian Santo. The name of the battalion was derived from the vicinity of Trozo in Santa Cruz, Manila and was composed of at least 400 native soldiers from the Spanish infantry. The 5th Trozo Battalion was notably involved in the Second Battle of Caloocan, which was at the time led by Colonel Soriano.
