= List of History with Lourd episodes =

History with Lourd is a 30-minute documentary show about history lessons. It airs every Saturday at 10:00-10:30 PM on TV5 and AksyonTV.

== Episodes ==
Episode Title	Episode #	Aired
Ex-President Marcos Naharap sa Sex Scandal	1	October 18, 2013
Bakla Sa Katipunan	2	October 25, 2013
Nasaan Ang Mga Labi ni Andres Bonifacio?	3	October 31, 2013
The Beatles in Manila '66	4	November 7, 2013
Gregorio del Pilar: The Boy General	5	November 14, 2013
Cory at PNoy: Masters of Disasters?	6	November 21, 2013
The Battle of Leyte Gulf	7	November 28, 2013
The Luna Brothers (Antonio and Juan)	8	December 4, 2013
Andres Bonifacio: Unang Pangulo?	9	December 11, 2013
Kasunduan Sa Biak-na-Bato	10	December 18, 2013
Nawawalang Buto ni Andrés Bonifacio	11	December 25, 2013
Sino Ba Si Macario Sakay?	12	January 8, 2014
Sakdalista: Mga Makabayan na Naging Makapili	13	January 15, 2014
Artemio Ricarte: Bayani o Traydor?	14	January 22, 2014
Love Triangle: Imelda, Ninoy, Cory	15	January 29, 2014
Jose Rizal: Lover Boy	16	February 5, 2014
Andres-Oryang: Soldiers of Love	17	February 12, 2014
Douglas MacArthur: Lover Boy o Mama's Boy?	18	February 19, 2014
Kilalanin si Epifanio de los Santos	19	February 26, 2014
Mga Babae sa Rebolusyon	20	March 5, 2014
Pre-Colonial Women: Sexual Aggressive?	21	March 12, 2014
Alamat ni Lapulapu?	22	March 19, 2014
Ben Tumbling	23	March 26, 2014
Ramon Magsaysay	24	April 2, 2014
Fliptop: Modernong Balagtasan?	25	April 9, 2014
Hudas ng Kasaysayan	26	April 23, 2014
Mabini, May Syphilitis?	27	April 30, 2014
Yamashita's treasure	28	May 7, 2014
Stonehill Scandal	29	May 14, 2014
Golden Arinola	30	May 21, 2014
Surplus War Property Scandal	31	May 28, 2014
Rebelding Pag-ibig: Imee at Tommy Manotoc	32	September 17, 2014
Love in the time of Martial Law	33	September 24, 2014
Love or Career: Manuel Roxas at Jovita Fuentes	34	October 1, 2014
Sinumpang Pag-ibig:Juan Luna at Paz Pardo De Tavera	35	October 8, 2014
Pag-iibigan nina Diego at Gabriela Silang	36	October 15, 2014
Nora Forever	37	October 22, 2014
Ang mamatay nang dahil sa'yo	38	October 29, 2014
RP-US Love-Hate relationship	39	November 5, 2014
Jose P. Laurel: Taksil o Bayani?	40	November 12, 2014
Da King	41	November 19, 2014
Government Scandal	42	November 26, 2014
Kwento ng Traydor at mga Taksil	43	December 3, 2014
Idol sa Kasaysayan	44	December 10, 2014
Mga Buhay Pag-ibig Sa Kasaysayan	45	December 17, 2014
Kalayaan Islands	46	July 11, 2015
Rizal and Bonifacio Monument	47	July 18, 2015
State of the Nation Address (SOanoNA?)	48	August 1, 2015
Ugnayang Aquino At Roxas	49	August 8, 2015
Diskarteng Quezon	50	August 15, 2015
Teorya sa Likod ng Pagpaslang ni dating Sen. Ninoy Aquino	51	August 22, 2015
Ang Pagpaslang ni Hen. Antonio Luna	52	August 29, 2015
Mali Noon, Problema Ngayon	53	September 5, 2015
Pamilya at Pulitika	54	September 12, 2015
Martial Law Myths Busted	55	September 19, 2015
Isyu ng Bayan	56	September 26, 2015
Trahedya sa Buhay ng Mga Bayani	57	October 3, 2015
Kwentong Politika	58	October 10, 2015
Artista sa Pulitika	59	October 17, 2015
Bayani o Gangster?	60	October 24, 2015
Greatest Presidents We Never Had (Part 1)	61	October 31, 2015
Yaman ng Pamilya Cojuangco	62	November 7, 2015
Balimbingan sa Pulitika	63	November 14, 2015
Black Propaganda Tuwing Eleksyon	64	November 21, 2015
Greatest President We Never Had (Part 2)	65	November 28, 2015
Bala at Balota	66	December 5, 2015
Anatomiya ng Kampanya	67	December 12, 2015
Bagong Simula	68	December 19, 2015
Mga Yumanig sa Kasaysayan ng Pinas sa Disyembre	69	December 26, 2015
Hamunan sa Kasaysayan	70	January 2, 2016
1986 Snap Elections	71	February 9, 2016
Kasaysayan ng Beauty Pageants sa Pilipinas	72	February 16, 2016
Calle de Escolta	73	February 23, 2016
People Power @ 30	74	March 1, 2016
Homosexuality	75	March 8, 2016
Watawat ng Pilipinas	76	March 15, 2016
Kwaresma	77	March 29, 2016
Greatest Hoaxes in Philippine History	78	April 5, 2016
Political Satire sa Pilipinas	79	April 12, 2016
Bala at Magsasaka	80	April 19, 2016
Kulturang Pinoy	81	April 26, 2016
