= Luna Sharpshooters =

Elite Filipino sharpshooter unit active during the Philippine–American War

Batallón Tiradores
- Active: 1899
- Country: Philippines
- Allegiance: Philippine Republic
- Branch: Philippine Republican Army
- Type: Infantry
- Role: Skirmishers
- Size: At least 1 battalion
- Nickname: Marksmen of Death
- Engagements: Philippine–American War; Second Battle of Caloocan; Battle of Malolos; Battle of Calumpit; Battle of San Mateo

Commanders
- Notable commanders: General Antonio Luna

Mauser rifles, similar to those used by the Luna Marksmen and the Black Guards

The Luna Sharpshooters, officially the Marksmen Battalion (Spanish: Batallón Tiradores) (Tagalog: Batalyong Tiradores) more colloquially known as the "Marksmen of Death" (Tiradores de la Muerte), was a military unit formed by General Antonio Luna to serve under the Philippine Republican Army. They became famous for their portrayal in pop culture as an elite unit of riflemen. Most of the members of this unit came from the old Spanish Army which fought during the Philippine Revolution.

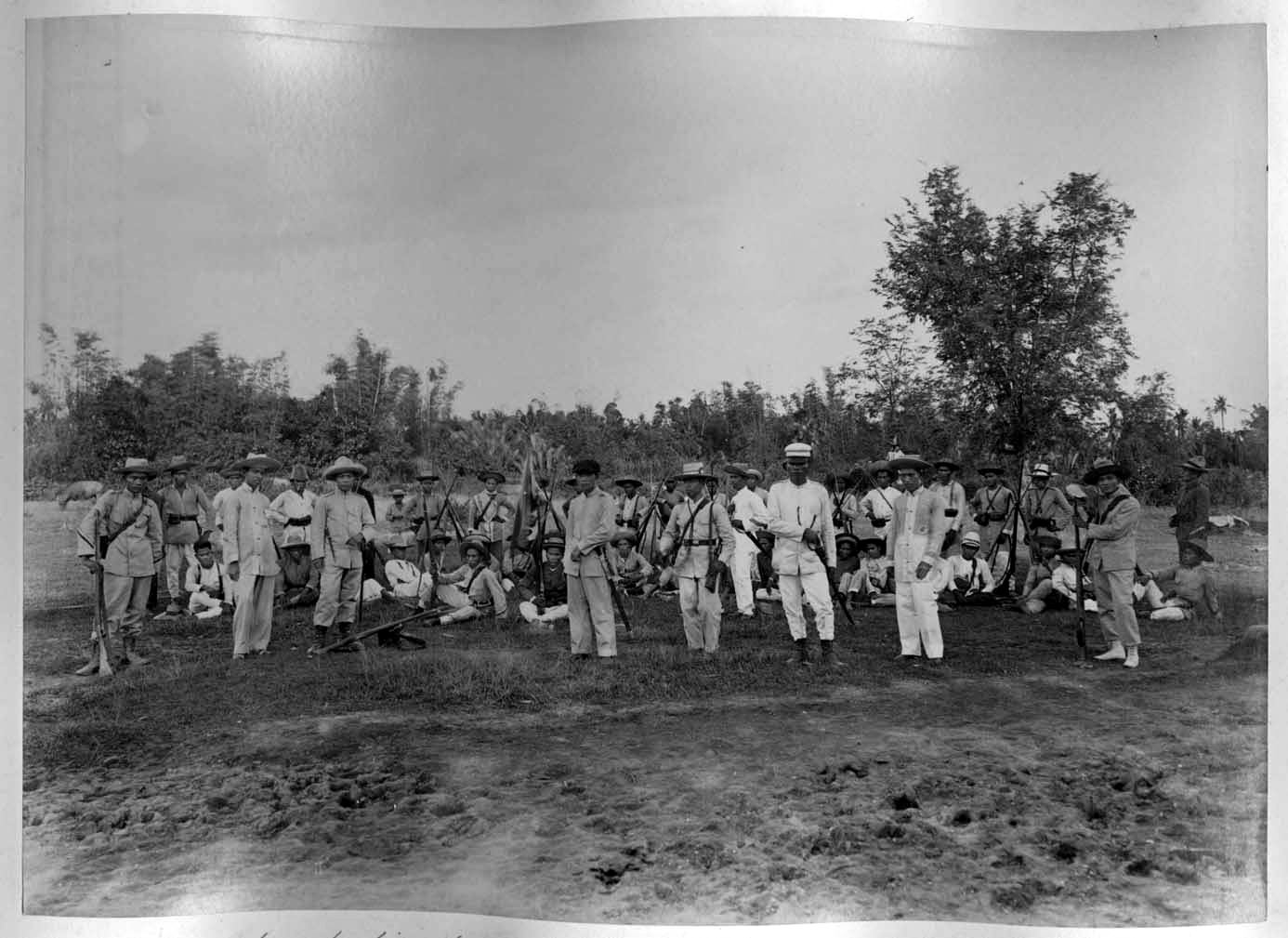
Tiradores and some militiamen at Paombong, Bulacan. This photo was retrieved from the William P. Moffett Papers. Moffett was an officer of the 1st North Dakota Volunteer Infantry.

== History ==
=== Formation ===
On February 11, 1899, two companies of troops under the command of Captain Santos Yaga Márquez and Captain Carlos Jaro, were sent by Secretary of War Baldomero Aguinaldo to Luna, who was then acting as the Chief of Operations of Polo. According to Aguinaldo, the two companies were arriving from Mariveles, where they were disarmed by Americans after having been discharged from the Spanish Army. According to José Alejandrino, these troops had come from either the 72nd or the 74th Infantry Regiments of the Spanish Army, and had requested Luna to not disband the two companies and promote their non-commissioned officers to commissions. This became the nucleus for the Batallón Tiradores.

=== Second Battle of Caloocan ===
The first mention of a Tiradores unit in action appears on the 15th of February in what would become the battleplan for the Second Battle of Caloocan. According to Luna's telegraph to Apolinario Mabini on this engagement, this would be executed on the 23rd, when Rosendo Simon y Pajarillo and a certain Torres under the command of Francisco Roman made an evening assault on the Tondo Train Station and successfully seized the station from American control. American forces sustained 15 dead and 50 wounded. Alejandrino notes Simon's actions at Bilibid, where they exchanged fire with the American forces until they ran out of ammunition, sustaining no casualties.

=== Defense of the Calumpit-Apalit Line ===
On April 24, at 3:00 PM, an engagement at Dampol and Pulilan broke out between elements of the Batallón Torres-Bugallón under the command of the newly promoted Lt. Col. Simon, the 5th and 4th company of the 1st Tiradores under a Captain Epifanio de Obin and Captain Lazo, and the 6th Company of the 2nd Tiradores under 2nd Lieutenant San Juan and American forces, which lasted until the afternoon of April 25. The Filipino forces at Dampol and Pulilan sustained 186 casualties. Simon and Obin claim to have inflicted 700 American casualties.

=== Battle of San Mateo ===
In the Battle of San Mateo on December 19, 1899, Bonifacio Mariano, a marksmen under the command of General Licerio Gerónimo, killed General Henry Ware Lawton, making the latter the highest ranking casualty during the course of the war.

== Related units ==
During the war, Luna also formed other units similar to the marksmen. One would be the unit commanded by Rosendo Simón de Pajarillo called Los Bandoleros. The unit emerged from a group of ten men wanting to volunteer in the regular Filipino army. Luna, still thinking of the defeat at the Battle of Caloocan, sent the men away at first. However, he soon changed his mind and decided to give the men an initiation. After taking breakfast, he ordered a subordinate, Colonel Queri, to prepare arms and ammunition for the ten men. Then, the men boarded a train destined towards Malinta (now in the City of Valenzuela), which was American-held territory. After giving orders to the men, he let them go and watched them with his telescope. The men, succeeding their mission, eventually returned unharmed. Admiring their bravery, he organized them into a guerrilla unit of around 50 members. This unit would see action in the Second Battle of Caloocan.

Another unit would be the Guardia Negra (Black Guard), a 25-man guerrilla unit under a Lieutenant García. García, one of Luna's favorites, was a modest but brave soldier. His unit was tasked to approach the enemy by surprise and quickly return to camp. Luna had admired García's unit very much that he wanted to increase their size. However, García declined the offer. Alejandrino later stated that he never heard of García and his unit again after Luna's resignation on February 28.
