= Antonio Luna =

Filipino general (1866–1899)

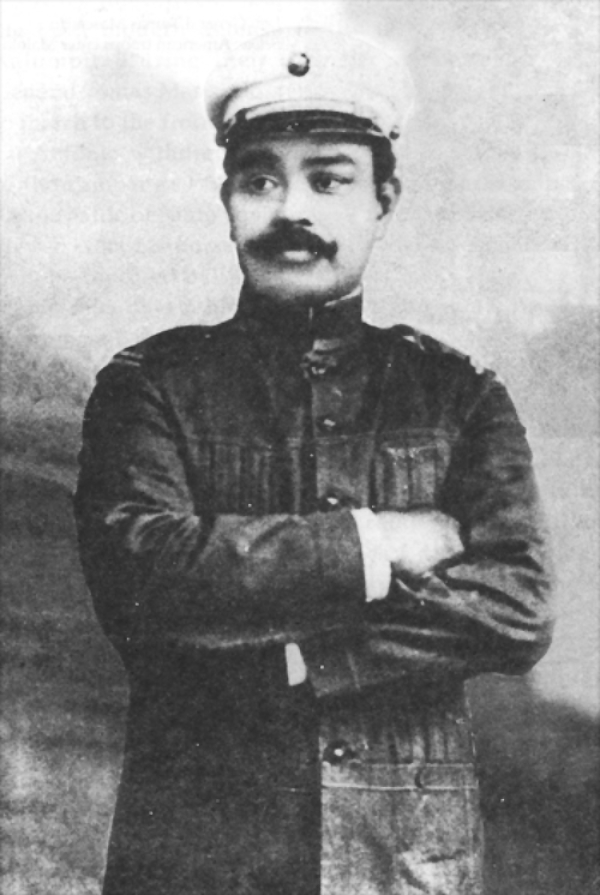

Commanding General of the Philippine Republican Army
- In office March 28, 1899 – June 5, 1899
- President: Emilio Aguinaldo
- Preceded by: Artemio Ricarte
- Succeeded by: Emilio Aguinaldo

Assistant Secretary of War and Supreme Commander of the Republican Army
- In office September 28, 1898 – March 1, 1899
- President: Emilio Aguinaldo

Chief of War Operations
- In office September 26, 1898 – September 28, 1898
- President: Emilio Aguinaldo

Personal details
- Born: Antonio Narciso Luna de San Pedro y Novicio Ancheta; October 29, 1866 San Nicolas, Manila, Captaincy General of the Philippines, Spanish Empire
- Died: June 5, 1899 (aged 32) Cabanatuan, Nueva Ecija, First Philippine Republic
- Cause of death: Assassination
- Relations: Juan Luna (brother); Joaquin Luna (brother)
- Awards: Philippine Republic Medal
- Nicknames: "Toñing"; "El General Monico"; "General Mayabang"; "General Articulo Uno"

Military service
- Allegiance: First Philippine Republic
- Branch/service: Philippine Republican Army
- Years of service: 1898–1899
- Rank: lieutenant general
- Battles/wars: Philippine–American War; Battle of Manila; Battle of Caloocan; Second Battle of Caloocan; Capture of Malolos; Battle of Pulilan; Battle of Calumpit; Battle of Apalit; Battle of Santo Tomas

Antonio Narciso Luna de San Pedro y Novicio Ancheta (Spanish: [anˈtonjo ˈluna]; October 29, 1866 – June 5, 1899) was a Filipino lieutenant general and a pharmacist who fought in the Philippine–American War before his assassination on June 5, 1899, at the age of 32.

Regarded as one of the fiercest generals of his time, he succeeded Artemio Ricarte as the Commanding General of the Philippine Army. He sought to apply his background in military science to the fledgling army. A sharpshooter himself, he organized professional guerrilla soldiers later named the "Luna Sharpshooters", and the "Black Guard" with Miguel Joaquín. His three-tier defense, now known as the Luna Defense Line, gave the American troops a difficult endeavor during their campaign in the provinces north of Manila. This defense line culminated in the creation of a military stronghold in the Cordillera.

Despite his commitment to discipline the army and serve the Republic which attracted the admiration of the people, his temper and fiery outlashes caused some to abhor him, including people from Aguinaldo's cabinet. Nevertheless, Luna's efforts were recognized during his time, and he was awarded the Philippine Republic Medal in 1899. He was also a member of the Malolos Congress. Besides his military studies, Luna also studied pharmacology, literature, and chemistry.

== Family background ==
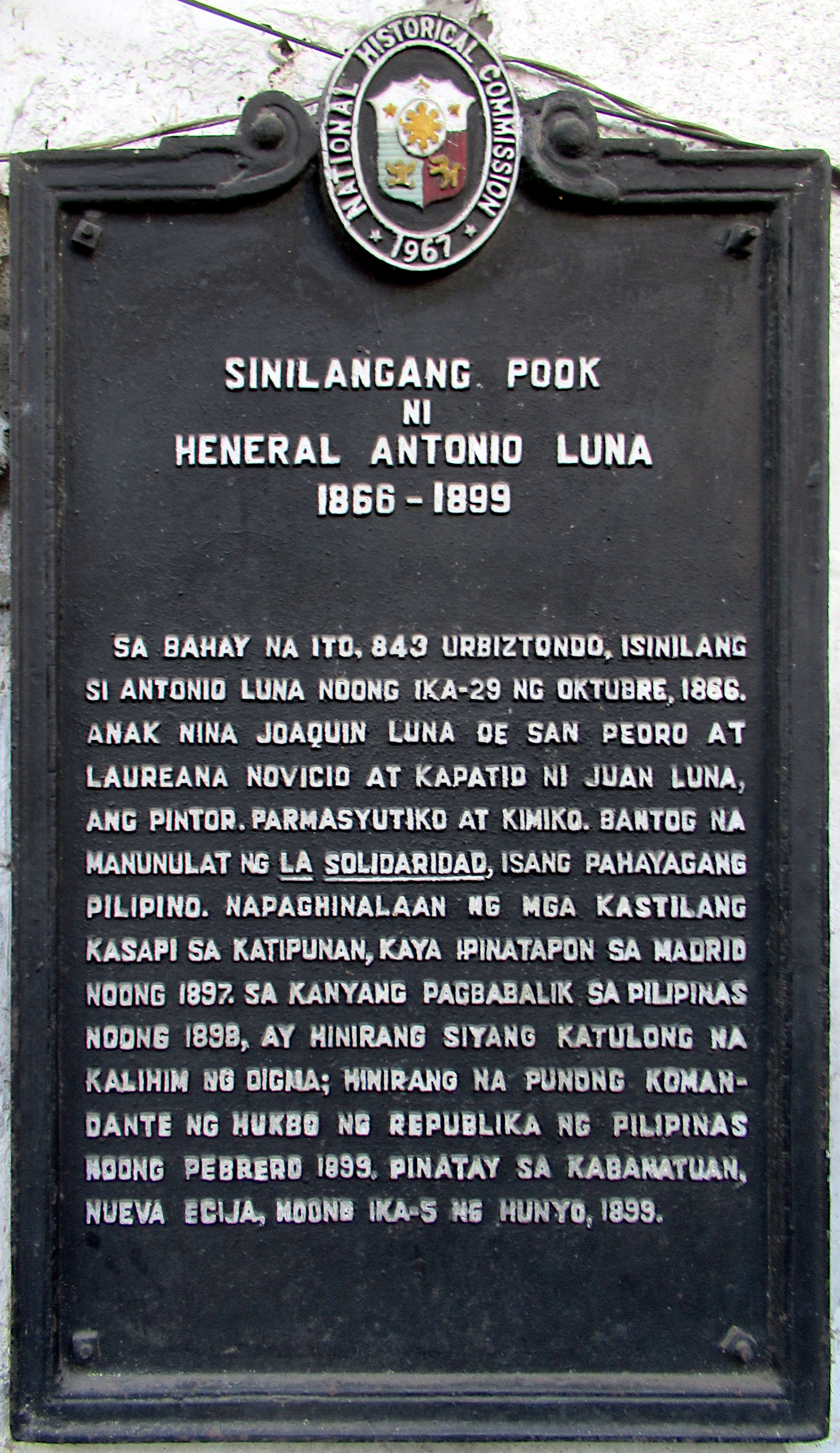
National historical marker installed in 1967 to mark the site where Luna was born in Manila

Antonio Narciso Luna de San Pedro y Novicio Ancheta was born on October 29, 1866, at their house along Calle Urbiztondo (renamed Barraca Street) in Binondo (now part of San Nicolas), Manila. He was the youngest of seven children of Joaquín Luna de San Pedro y Posadas (1829–1891) from Badoc, Ilocos Norte, and Spanish mestiza Laureana Novicio y Ancheta (1836–1906) from Namacpacan, La Union (now Luna). His father was a traveling salesman of the government tobacco monopoly. The tobacco monopoly was formally established in 1782. After their family moved to Manila in 1861, his father became a merchant in Binondo.

=== Siblings ===
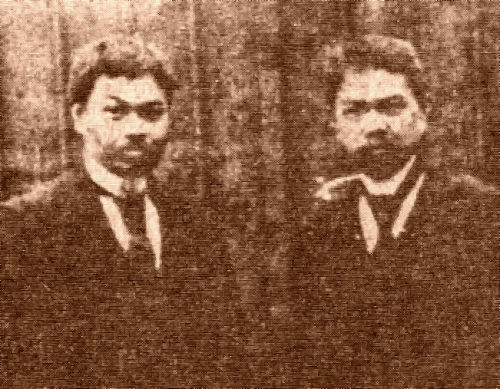
Luna (left) and brother Juan Luna

His older brother, Juan, was an accomplished painter who studied in the Madrid Escuela de Bellas Artes de San Fernando. His Spoliarium garnered one of the three gold medals awarded in the Madrid Exposición Nacional de Bellas Artes in 1884. Another brother, José, became a doctor. Yet another brother, Joaquín, fought with Antonio in the Philippine–American War, and later served as governor of La Union from 1904 to 1907. Joaquín would also serve as a senator from 1916 to 1919. His three other siblings were Numeriana, Manuel, and Remedios.

== Education ==
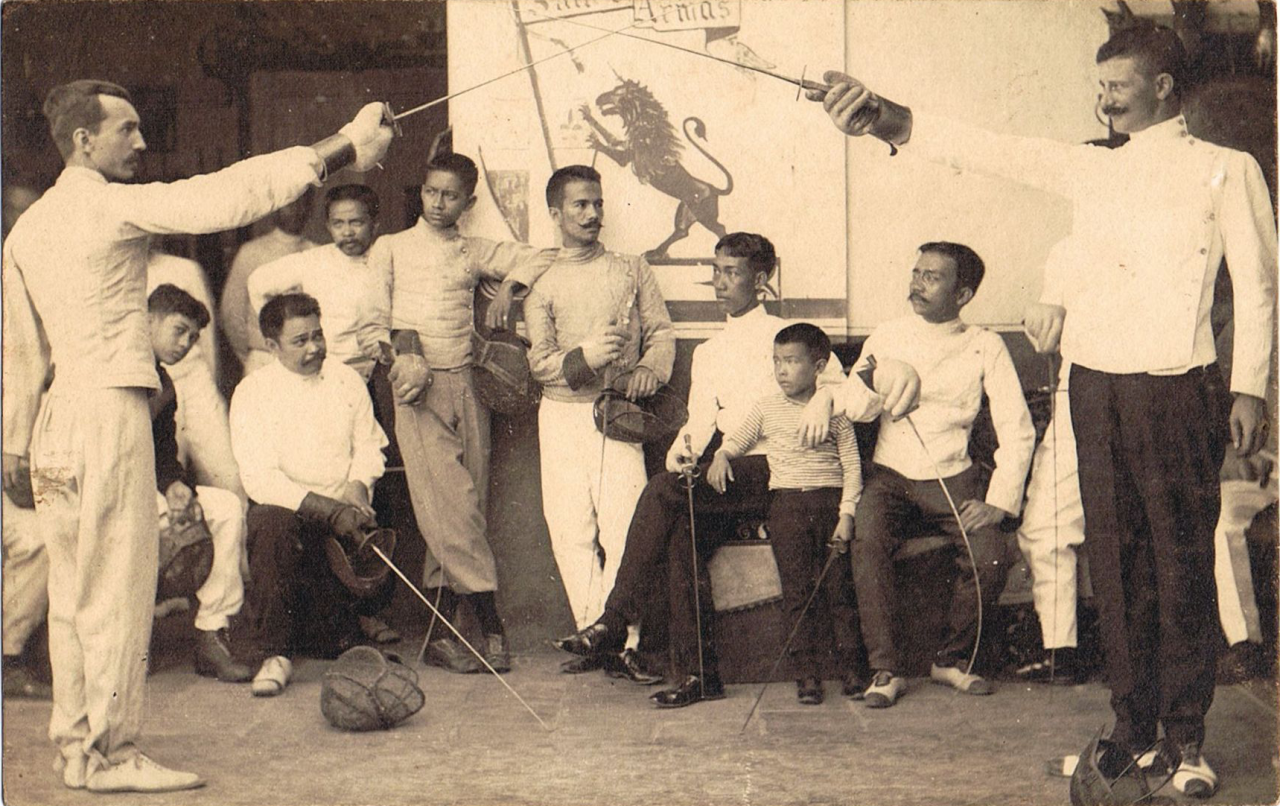
Luna (sitting, 2nd from left) and some of his scholars of Sala de Armas, a fencing club which was located in Camarines Sur, Iriga City

At the age of 6, Luna learned reading, writing, and arithmetic from a teacher known as Maestro Intong. He also memorized the Doctrina Christiana, believed to be the first book printed in the Philippines. The book consists of 38 leaves and 74 pages of text in Spanish, Tagalog transliterated into roman letters, and Tagalog.

After his education under Maestro Intong, he studied at the Ateneo Municipal de Manila, where he received a Bachelor of Arts degree in 1881. He went on to study literature and chemistry at the University of Santo Tomas, where he won first prize for a paper in chemistry titled Two Fundamental Bodies of Chemistry (Dos Cuerpos fundamentales de la Quimica). He also studied Pharmacy. Meanwhile, his background in swordsmanship, fencing, and military tactics came from his studies under Don Martin Cartagena, a major in the Spanish Army. In addition, he acquired the skill to become a sharpshooter. Upon the invitation of his elder brother Juan in 1890, Antonio was sent by his parents to Spain. There he acquired a licentiate (at Universidad de Barcelona) and doctorate (at Universidad Central de Madrid).

While in Spain, Luna not only focused on his studies but also joined the Propaganda Movement, alongside prominent figures like José Rizal and Marcelo H. del Pilar. He actively contributed to La Solidaridad, promoting reforms in the Philippines under Spanish rule.

=== Influence of European military tactics ===
Luna's time in Europe also deepened his understanding of military tactics. In Spain, he spent his time reading books on military strategy and tactics, guerrilla warfare, and field fortifications. These complemented his studies on swordsmanship and fencing, which later helped him when he became a general during the Philippine–American War. His disciplined and strategic approach to warfare was influenced by European military theories.

=== Scientific achievements ===
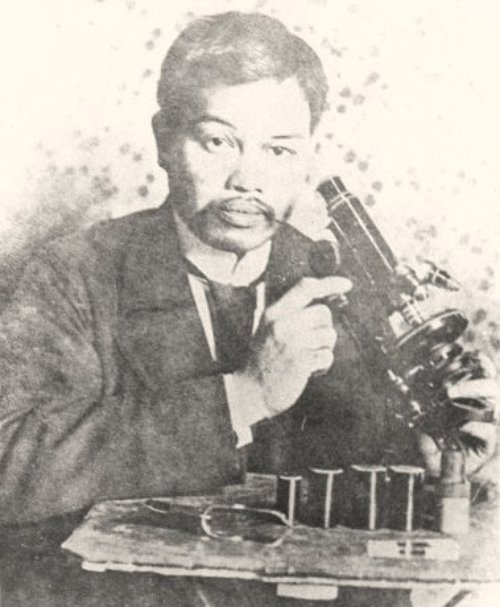
Antonio Luna poses with a microscope at the Institut Pasteur in Paris.

Luna was active as a researcher in the scientific community. After receiving his doctorate in 1893, he published a scientific treatise on malaria entitled On Malarial Pathology (El Hematozoario del Paludismo), which was favorably received in the scientific community. He then went to Belgium and France and worked as an assistant to Dr. Latteaux at the Pasteur Institute and to Dr. Laffen. In recognition of his ability, he was commissioned by the Spanish government to study tropical and communicable diseases. In 1894, he returned to the Philippines where he took part in an examination to determine who would become the chief chemist of the Municipal Laboratory of Manila. Luna came in first and won the position.

== Propaganda Movement and the Philippine Revolution ==
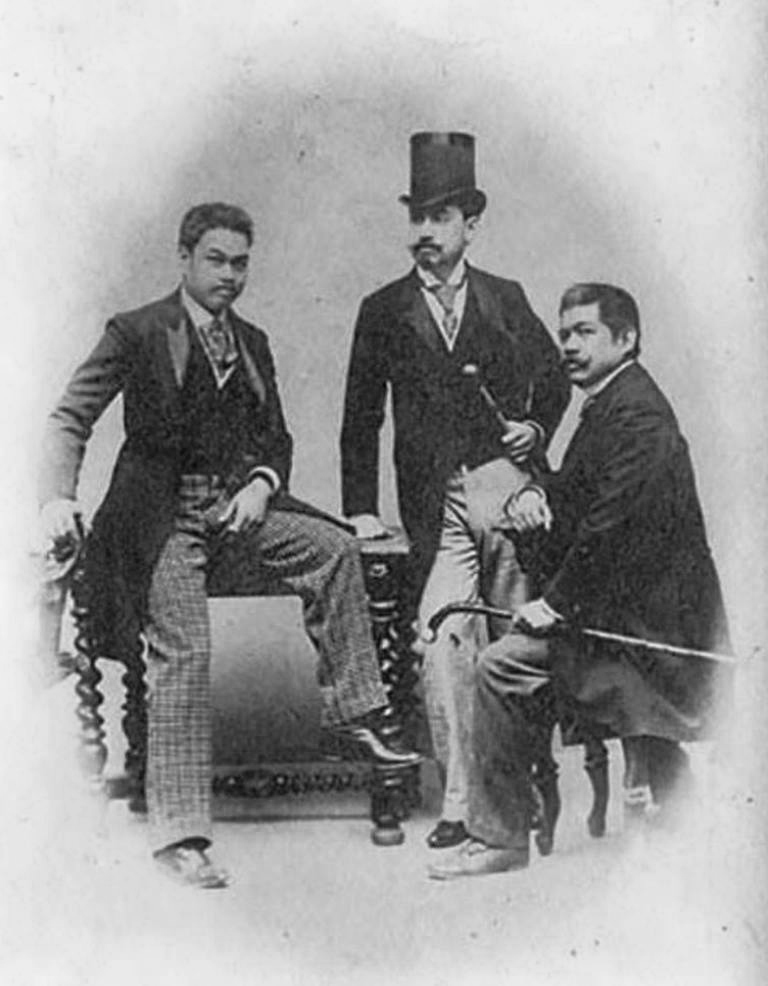
Luna with fellow reformists Eduardo de Lete (center) and Marcelo H. del Pilar (right), Spain, 1890

In Spain, he became one of the Filipino expatriates who mounted the Propaganda Movement and wrote for La Solidaridad, headed by Galicano Apacible. He wrote a piece titled Impressions which dealt with Spanish customs and idiosyncrasies under the pen-name "Taga-ilog". Also, like many of the Filipino liberals in Spain, Luna became a Freemason and rose to the degree of Master Mason.

He and his brother Juan also opened the Sala de Armas, a fencing club, in Manila. When he learned of the underground societies that were planning a revolution and was asked to join, he scoffed at the idea and turned down the offer. Like other Filipino émigrés involved in the Reform Movement, he was in favor of reform rather than revolution as the way toward independence. Besides affecting their property, the proponents of the Reform Movement saw that no revolution would succeed without the necessary preparations. This was further proven when Pío Valenzuela, Andres Bonifacio's emissary, visited Dr. Jose Rizal in Dapitan in June 1896 to inform him of the plan of the Katipunan to launch a revolution. While Rizal outright objected due to it being premature, he advised that Luna be approached with a request that he become a liaison officer between the Katipunan and the rich and influential people of Manila to strengthen their cause through more money to obtain arms and create an officer cadre. However, when approached by Jose Alejandrino at the request of the Katipunan, Luna also turned down the offer with the same reason as Rizal: that a revolt at that time was premature and would fail.

Nevertheless, after the existence of the Katipunan was leaked in August 1896, the Luna brothers were arrested and jailed in Fort Santiago for "participating" in the revolution. His statement concerning the revolution was one of the many statements used to abet the laying down of the death sentence for José Rizal. Months later, José and Juan were freed but Antonio was exiled to Spain in 1897, where he was imprisoned in Madrid's Cárcel Modelo.

His more famous and controversial brother, Juan, who had been pardoned by the Spanish Queen Regent Maria Christina of Austria herself, left for Spain to use his influence to intercede for Antonio in August 1897. Antonio's case was dismissed by the Military Supreme Court and he was released. Upon his release in December 1897, Luna went to Ghent to study field fortifications, guerrilla warfare, organization, and other aspects of military science under the Belgian general Gerard Leman, who would later be the commanding general of the fortress at Liège in World War I. He also read extensively about the discipline when he was at the Ateneo de Madrid. The second phase of the revolution began with the return of Emilio Aguinaldo by the US Navy to Cavite in 1898 his establishment of the Dictatorial Government of the Philippines. Upon arriving in Hong Kong, Luna was given a letter of recommendation to Aguinaldo and a revolver by Felipe Agoncillo. Receiving his military commission, he returned to the Philippines in July 1898.

== Personal life ==
Luna courted Nellie Boustead, a woman who was also courted by José Rizal, between 1889 and 1891. Boustead was reportedly infatuated with Rizal. At a party held by Filipinos, a drunk Antonio Luna made unsavory remarks against Boustead. This prompted Rizal to challenge Luna to a duel. However, Luna apologized to Rizal, thus averting a duel between the compatriots.

== Philippine–American War ==
=== Prior to the war ===
Since June 1898, Manila had been surrounded by the revolutionary troops. Colonel Luciano San Miguel occupied Mandaluyong, General Pío del Pilar advanced through Sampaloc and attacked Puente Colgante, causing the enemy to fall back, General Mariano Noriel, Parañaque, Colonel Enrique Pacheco, Navotas, Tambobong and Caloocan. General Gregorio del Pilar took charge of Pantaleon Garcia's force when the latter was wounded, taking Pritil, Tondo, Divisoria, and Paseo de Azcárraga, Noriel cleared Singalong and Paco, and held Ermita and Malate. Aguinaldo demanded joint occupation of Intramuros, which the Americans heeded. After one month of joint occupation, Aguinaldo withdrew his forces when he received a telegram from General Elwell Otis that he would be obliged to resort to forcible action if Aguinaldo did not pull his forces back, and Commodore (later Admiral) George Dewey's fleet had moored in Manila Bay after being warned of an unwanted conflict between Filipinos and Americans. When Luna was in the trenches, he ordered his troops to fire on the Americans. After the chaos following the American occupation, at a meeting in Ermita, Luna tried to complain to American officers about the disorderly conduct of their soldiers.

To silence Luna, Aguinaldo appointed him as Chief of War Operations on September 26, 1898, and assigned the rank of brigadier general. In quick succession, he was made the Director or Assistant Secretary of War and Supreme Chief of the Republican Army on September 28, arousing the envy of the other generals who were fighting since the first phase of the Revolution. Meanwhile, Luna felt that bureaucratic placebos were being thrown his way when all he wanted was to organize and discipline the enthusiastic but ill-fed and ill-trained troops into a real army.

On September 15, 1898, the Malolos Congress, the constituent assembly of the First Philippine Republic, was convened in Barasoain Church. Luna would be one of the elected representatives and was narrowly defeated by Pedro Paterno as President of the Congress with a vote of 24–23.

Seeing the need for a military school, in October 1898, Luna established a military academy at Malolos, known as the Academia Militar which would become the basis of the modern-day Philippine Military Academy based in Baguio. He appointed Colonel Manuel Bernal Sityar, a mestizo who was formerly a lieutenant serving the Civil Guard, as superintendent. He recruited other mestizos and Spaniards who had fought in the Spanish Army during the 1896 Revolution for training. However, the academy had to be suspended indefinitely by March 1899 due to the outbreak of the Philippine–American War.

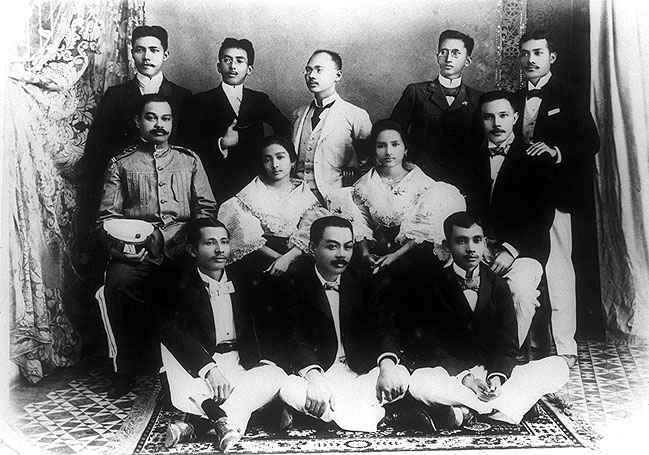
Luna (center row, seated left) and the staff of La Independencia in 1898

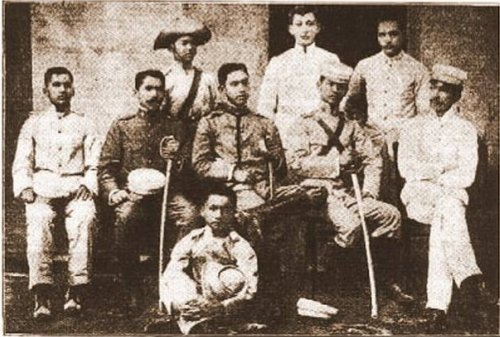
Group showing some of Luna's aides: General Manuel Tinio (seated, center), General Benito Natividad (seated, 2nd from right), General Jose Alejandrino (seated, 2nd from left)

A score of veteran officers became teachers at his military school. Luna devised two courses of instruction, planned the reorganization, with a battalion of tiradores and a cavalry squadron, set up an inventory of guns and ammunition, arsenals, using convents and town halls, quartermasters, lookouts and communication systems. He built trenches with the help of his chief engineer, General Jose Alejandrino, and had his brother Juan design the school's uniforms (the Filipino rayadillo). He also insisted on strict discipline over and above clan armies and regional loyalties, which prevented coordination between various military units. Envisioning one united army for the Republic, clan armies and regional loyalties presented a lack of national consciousness.

Convinced that the fate of the infant Republic should be a contest for the minds of Filipinos, Luna turned to journalism to strengthen Filipino minds with the ideas of nationhood and the need to fight the Americans. He decided to publish a newspaper, La Independencia. This four-page daily was filled with articles, short stories, patriotic songs and poems. The staff was installed in one of the coaches of the train that ran from Manila to Pangasinan. The paper came out in September 1898 and was an instant success. A movable feast of information, humor, and good writing, 4,000 copies were printed, which was more than all the other newspapers in circulation put together.

When the Treaty of Paris, under which Spain was to cede the Philippines to the United States, was made public in December 1898, Luna quickly decided to take military action. He proposed a strategy that was designed to trap the Americans in Manila before more of their troops could land by executing surprise attacks (guerrilla warfare) while building up strength in the north. If the American forces penetrated his lines, Luna determined that he would wage a series of delaying battles and prepare a fortress in northern Luzon, the Cordillera. This, however, was turned down by high command, which still believed that the Americans would grant full independence.

=== Outbreak of the war ===
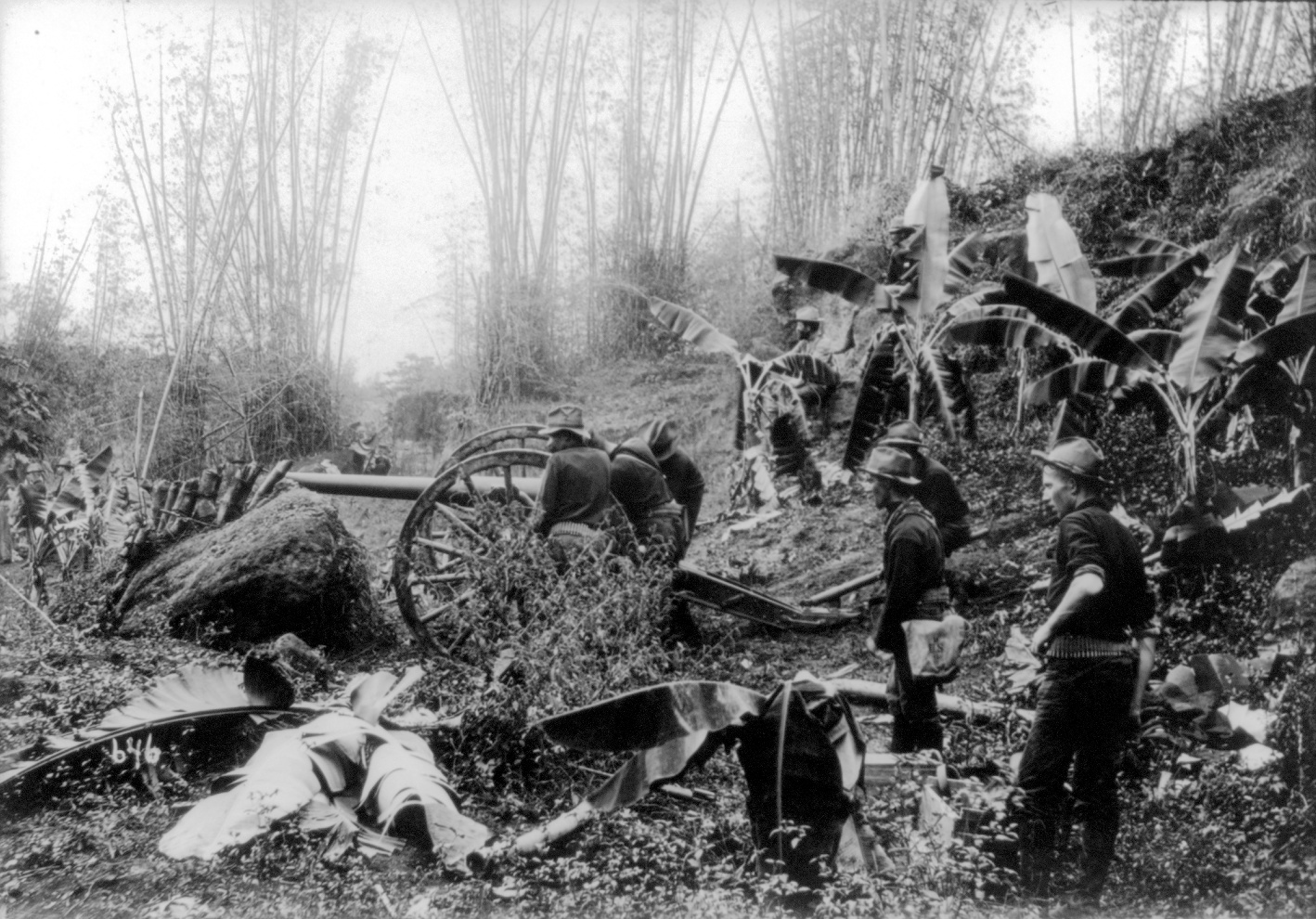
American soldiers of the 1st Nebraska Volunteers, Company B, during the Battle of Manila

The Americans gained the opportunity to start hostilities with the Filipinos at the place and time of their choice. On the night of February 4, 1899, when most of the Filipino generals were at a ball in Malolos to celebrate the success of the American anti-imperialists delaying the ratification of the Treaty of Paris, the Americans staged an incident along the concrete blockhouses in Santa Mesa near the Balsahan Bridge. An American patrol fired on Filipino troops, claiming afterward that the Filipinos had started shooting first. The whole Filipino line from Pasay to Caloocan returned fire and the first battle of the Philippine–American War ensued. Two days later, in response to the incident, the US Senate voted for annexation. In doing so, the conflict became the war of conquest, occupation, and annexation that Luna, Mabini, and others had predicted and about which they had warned Aguinaldo and his generals previously.

Luna, after receiving orders from Aguinaldo, rushed to the front lines from his headquarters at Polo (present-day Valenzuela City) and led three companies to La Loma to engage General Arthur MacArthur's forces. Fighting took place at Marikina, Caloocan, Santa Ana, and Paco. The Filipinos were subjected to a carefully planned attack with naval artillery, with Admiral George Dewey's US fleet firing from Manila Bay. Filipino casualties were high, amounting to around 2,000 killed and wounded. Luna personally had to carry wounded officers and men to safety; of these, the most dramatic rescue was that of Commander José Torres Bugallón. After being hit by an American bullet, Bugallón had managed to advance another fifty meters before he was seen by Luna collapsing by the side of the road. As the Americans continued their fire on the road, Luna gathered an escort of around 25 men to save Bugallón, who Luna stated was equivalent to 500 men. Surviving the encounter, Luna encouraged Bugallón to live by giving him an instant promotion to lieutenant colonel. However, Bugallón succumbed to his wounds.

On February 7, Luna issued a detailed order to the field officers of the territorial militia. Containing five specific objects, it began with "Under the barbarous attack upon our army on February 4", and ended with "...war without quarter to false Americans who wish to enslave us. Independence or death!" The order labeled the US forces "an army of drunkards and thieves" in response to the continued bombardment of the towns around Manila, the burning and looting of whole districts, and the raping of Filipino women by US troops.

When Luna saw that the American advance had halted, mainly to stabilize their lines, he again mobilized his troops to attack La Loma on February 10. Fierce fighting ensued but the Filipinos were forced to withdraw thereafter. Caloocan has left with American forces in control of the southern terminus of the Manila to Dagupan railway, along with five engines, fifty passenger coaches, and a hundred freight cars. After consolidating control of Caloocan, the obvious next objective for American forces would be the Republic capital at Malolos. However, General Elwell Otis delayed for almost a month in hopes that Filipino forces would be deployed in its defense.

With their superior firepower and newly arrived reinforcements, the Americans had not expected such resistance. They were so surprised that an urgent cable was sent to General Henry Lawton who was in Colombo, Ceylon (now Sri Lanka), with his troops. The telegram stated, "Situation critical in Manila. Your early arrival great importance."

=== Luna Sharpshooters and the Black Guard ===
The Luna Sharpshooters was a short-lived unit formed by Luna to serve under the Philippine Revolutionary Army. On February 11, eight infantrymen, formerly under Captains Márquez and Jaro, were sent by then-Secretary of War Baldomero Aguinaldo to Luna, then-Assistant Secretary of War. The infantrymen were disarmed by the Americans, and journeyed to be commissioned in the regular Filipino army. Seeing their desire to serve in the army, Luna took them in and from there the group grew and emerged as the Luna Sharpshooters. The sharpshooters became famous for their fierce fighting and proved their worth by spearheading every major battle in the Philippine–American War. After the Battle of Calumpit on April 25–27, 1899, only seven or eight remained in the regular Filipino army. In the Battle of Paye on December 18, 1899, a Filipino sharpshooter, Private Bonifacio Mariano, under the command of General Licerio Gerónimo killed General Henry Ware Lawton, making the latter the highest-ranking casualty during the course of the war.

Luna also formed other units similar to the sharpshooters. One was the unit commanded by Rosendo Simón de Pajarillo, which would later be named after Bugallón. The unit emerged from a group of ten men wanting to volunteer in the regular Filipino army. Luna, still thinking of the defeat at the Battle of Caloocan, sent the men away at first. However, he soon changed his mind and decided to give the men an initiation. After taking breakfast, he ordered a subordinate, Colonel Queri, to prepare arms and ammunition for the ten men. Then, the men boarded a train destined towards Malinta, which was American-held territory. After giving orders to the men, he let them go and watched them with his telescope. The men succeeded in their mission and eventually returned unharmed. Admiring their bravery, he organized them into a guerrilla unit of around 50 members. This unit would see action in the Second Battle of Caloocan.

Another elite unit was the Black Guard, a 25-man guerrilla unit under a certain Lieutenant García. García, one of Luna's favorites, was a modest but brave soldier. His unit was tasked to approach the enemy by surprise and quickly return to camp. Luna had admired García's unit so much that he wanted to increase their size. However, García declined the offer, believing that a larger force might undermine the efficiency of their work. Jose Alejandrino, the chief army engineer and one of Luna's aides, stated that he never heard of García and his unit again after Luna's resignation on February 28.

=== Further operations during the war ===
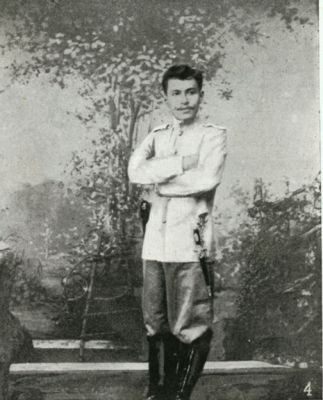
General Tomás Mascardo, military commander of Pampanga

A Filipino counterattack began at dawn on February 23. The plan was to employ a pincer movement, using the battalions from the North and South, with the sharpshooters at crucial points. The sandatahanes or bolomen inside Manila would start a great fire to signal the start of the assault. Troops directly under Luna's command were divided into three: the West Brigade under General Pantaleon García, the Center Brigade under General Mariano Llanera, and the East Brigade under General Licerio Gerónimo. Luna also requested the battle-hardened Tinio Brigade from Northern Luzon, under the command of General Manuel Tinio. It had more than 1,900 soldiers. However, Aguinaldo gave only ambiguous answers and the Tinio Brigade was unable to participate in the battle. The battle was only partly successful because of two main reasons. Firstly, some of the successful Filipino sectors ran low on ammunition and food and were thus forced to withdraw to Polo. Secondly, Luna failed to relieve the Kapampangan militia, already past their prime, when the battalion from Kawit, Cavite, refused to replace the former, saying that they had orders to obey only instructions directly from Aguinaldo. Such insubordination had become quite common among the Filipino forces at that time as most of the troops owed their loyalty to the officers from their provinces, towns, or districts and not to the central command. As a result, the counterattack soon collapsed, and Luna placated himself by personally disarming the Kawit Battalion.

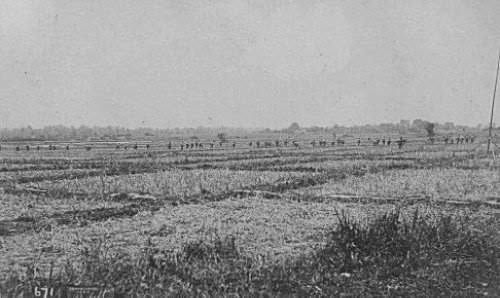
1st Nebraskan Volunteers advancing during the Battle of Santo Tomas

Luna, however, proved to be a strict disciplinarian and his temper alienated many in the ranks of the common soldiers. An example of this occurred during the Battle of Calumpit, wherein Luna ordered General Tomás Mascardo to send troops from Guagua to strengthen the former's defenses. However, Mascardo ignored orders by Luna insisting that he was going to Arayat to undertake an "inspection of troops". Another version of Mascardo's reasoning emerged and claimed that Mascardo had left to visit his girlfriend, which was probably the version which reached Luna. Luna, infuriated by Mascardo's actions, decided to detain him. Major Hernando, one of Luna's aides, tried to placate the general's anger and convinced Luna to push the case to President Aguinaldo. Aguinaldo complied and detained Mascardo for 24 hours. Upon returning to the field, however, the Americans had broken through his defenses at the Bagbag River, forcing Luna to withdraw despite his heroic efforts to defend the remaining sectors.

Luna resigned on March 1, mainly resenting the rearmament of the Kawit Battalion as the Presidential Guard. Aguinaldo hesitantly accepted the resignation. As a result, Luna was absent from the field for three weeks, during which the Filipino forces suffered several defeats and setbacks. One such defeat would be at the Battle of Marilao River on March 27. Receiving the depressing reports from the field through his La Independencia correspondents, Luna went to Aguinaldo and asked to be reinstated with more powers over all the military heads, and Aguinaldo promoted him to Lieutenant General and agreed to make him Commander-in-Chief of all the Filipino forces in Central Luzon (Bulacan, Tarlac, Pampanga, Nueva Ecija, Bataan, and Zambales).

The Luna Defense Line was planned to create a series of delaying battles from Caloocan to Angeles, Pampanga, as the Republic was constructing a guerrilla base in the Mountain Province. The base was planned to be the last stand headquarters of the Republic in case the Americans broke through the Defense Line. American military observers were astonished by the Defense Line, which they described as consisting of numerous bamboo trenches stretching from town to town. The series of trenches allowed the Filipinos to withdraw gradually, firing from cover at the advancing Americans. As the American troops occupied each new position, they were subjected to a series of traps that had been set in the trenches, including bamboo spikes and poisonous reptiles.

Earlier in May 1899, Luna almost fell in the field at the Battle of Santo Tomas. Mounted on his horse, Luna charged into the battlefield leading his main force in a counterattack. As they advanced, the American forces began firing upon them. Luna's horse was hit and he fell to the ground. As he recovered, Luna realized that he had been shot in the stomach, and he attempted to kill himself with his revolver to avoid capture. He was saved, though, by the actions of a Filipino colonel named Alejandro Avecilla who, seeing Luna fall, rode towards the general to save him. Despite being heavily wounded in one of his legs and an arm, with his remaining strength Avecilla carried Luna away from the battle to the Filipino rear. Upon reaching safety, Luna realized that his wound was not very deep as most of the bullet's impact had been taken by a silk belt full of gold coins that his parents had given him. As he left the field to have his wounds tended, Luna turned over the command to General Venancio Concepción, the Filipino commander of the nearby town of Angeles. In recognition of his work, Luna was awarded the Philippine Republic Medal. By the end of May 1899, Colonel Joaquín Luna, one of Antonio's brothers, warned him that a plot had been concocted by "old elements" or the autonomists of the Republic (who were bent on accepting American sovereignty over the country) and a clique of army officers whom Luna had disarmed, arrested, and/or insulted. Luna shrugged off all these threats, reiterating his trust for Aguinaldo, and continued building defenses at Pangasinan where the Americans were planning a landing.

== Assassination and aftermath ==
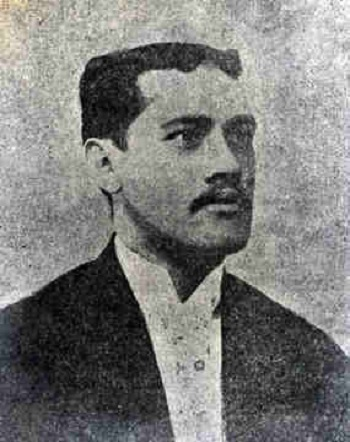
Colonel Francisco Román, Luna's aide-de-camp, was assassinated with him.

On June 2, 1899, Luna received two telegrams (initially four, but he never received the last two) – one asked for help in launching a counterattack in San Fernando, Pampanga; and the other, sent by Aguinaldo himself, ordered him to go to the new capital at Cabanatuan, Nueva Ecija to form a new cabinet. In his jubilation, Luna wrote Arcadio Maxilom, military commander of Cebu, to stand firm in the war. Luna set off from Bayambang, first by train, then on horseback, and eventually in three carriages to Nueva Ecija with 25 of his men. During the journey, two of the carriages broke down, so he proceeded with just one carriage with Colonel Francisco Román and Captain Eduardo Rusca, having earlier shed his cavalry escort. On June 4, Luna sent a telegram to Aguinaldo confirming his arrival. Upon arriving at Cabanatuan on June 5, Luna proceeded alone to the church in Cabanatuan, where the headquarters was located, to communicate with the President. As he went up the stairs, he ran into an officer whom he had previously disarmed for insubordination: Captain Pedro Janolino, commander of the Kawit Battalion, and an old enemy whom he had once threatened with arrest for favoring American autonomy. Captain Janolino was accompanied by Felipe Buencamino, the Minister of Foreign Affairs, and a member of the Cabinet. He was told that Aguinaldo had left for San Isidro in Nueva Ecija (he actually went to Bamban, Tarlac). Enraged, Luna asked why he had not been told that the meeting was canceled.

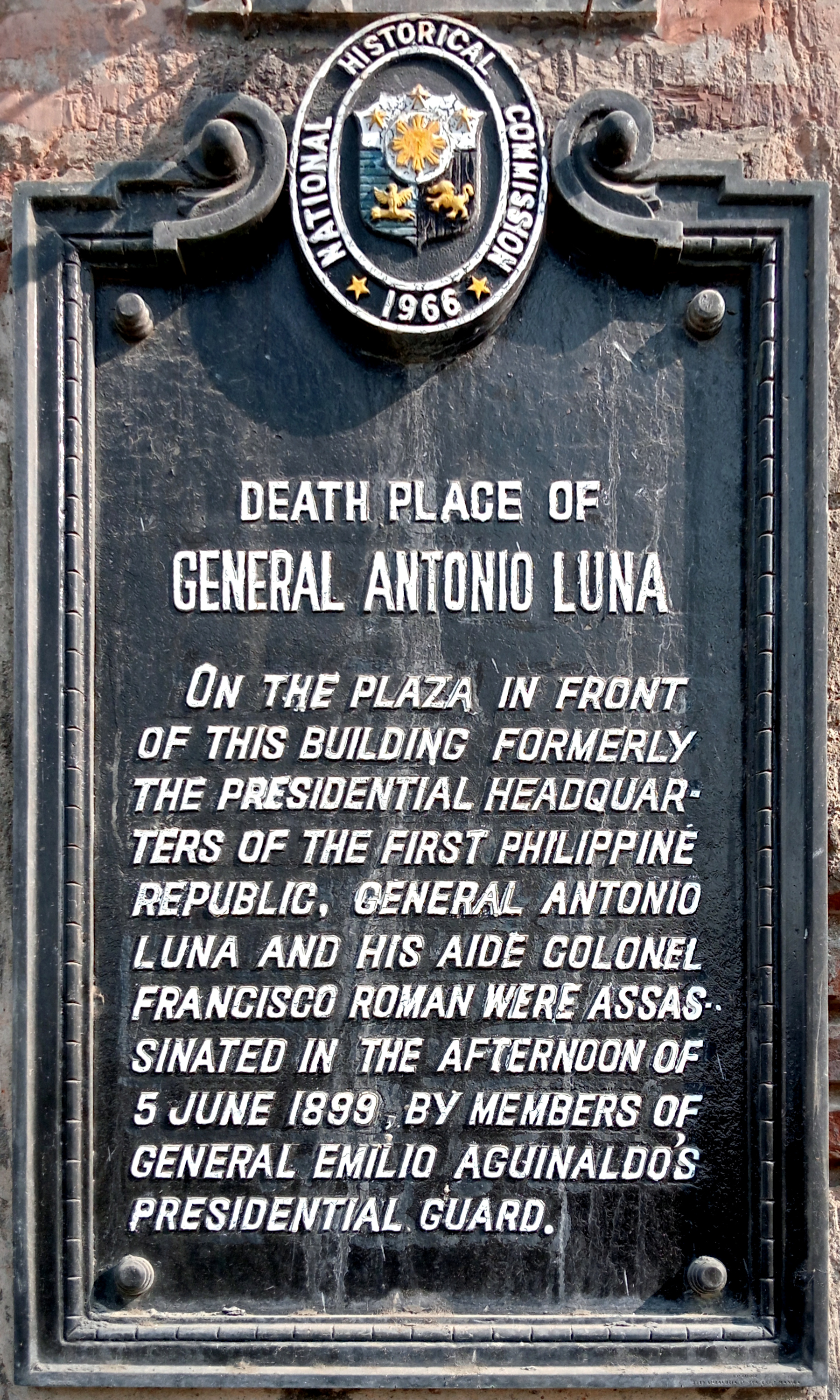
Historical marker installed by the National Historical Commission in 1966 in front of Plaza Lucero to mark the place where Luna was assassinated

Both exchanged heated words as he was about to depart. At Plaza Lucero, fronting the church of Cabanatuan, a rifle shot rang out. Still outraged and furious, Luna rushed down the stairs and met Janolino, accompanied by some elements of the Kawit Battalion. Janolino swung his bolo at Luna, wounding him in the head. Janolino's men fired at Luna, while others started stabbing him, even as he tried to fire his revolver at one of his attackers. He staggered out into the plaza where Román and Rusca were rushing to his aid, but as he lay dying, they too were set upon and shot, with Román being killed and Rusca being severely wounded. Luna received more than 30 wounds, and uttered "Cowards! Assassins!" He was hurriedly buried in the churchyard, after which Aguinaldo relieved Luna's officers and men from the field, including General Venancio Concepción, whose headquarters in Angeles, Pampanga was besieged by Aguinaldo on the same day Luna was assassinated.

Immediately after Luna's death, confusion reigned on both sides. The Americans even thought Luna had taken over to replace Aguinaldo. Luna's death was publicly declared only by June 8, and a circular providing details of the event released by June 13. While investigations were supposedly made concerning Luna's death, not one person was convicted. Later, General Pantaleon García said that it was he who was verbally ordered by Aguinaldo to conduct the assassination of Luna at Cabanatuan. His sickness at the time prevented his participation in the assassination. Aguinaldo would be firm in his stand that he had nothing to do with the assassination of Luna.

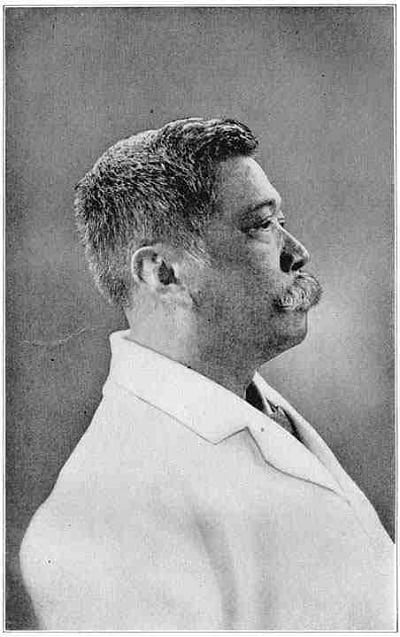
Felipe Buencamino succeeded Apolinario Mabini as Secretary of Foreign Affairs during the First Philippine Republic.

The death of Luna, acknowledged to be the most brilliant and capable of the Filipino generals at the time, was a decisive factor in the fight against the American forces. Despite mixed reactions on both the Filipino and American sides on the death of Luna, there are people from both sides who nevertheless developed an admiration for him. General Frederick Funston, who captured Aguinaldo at Palanan, Isabela, stated that Luna was the "ablest and most aggressive leader of the Filipino Republic." For General James Franklin Bell, Luna "was the only general the Filipino army had." General Robert Hughes remarked that "with the death of General Luna, the Filipino army lost the only General it had." Meanwhile, Apolinario Mabini, former Prime Minister and Secretary of Foreign Affairs, had this to say: "If he was sometimes hasty and even cruel in his resolution, it was because the army had been brought to a desperate situation by the demoralization of the soldiers and the lack of ammunitions: nothing but action of rash courage and extraordinary energy could hinder its dissolution." Of the Filipino armed forces organized during Luna's service in the army, Major General Henry Ware Lawton commented, "Filipinos are a very fine set of soldiers, far better than the Indians... Inferior in every particular equipment and supplies, they are the bravest men I have ever seen... I'm very well impressed with the Filipinos!" Lawton later recanted this statement.

Subsequently, Aguinaldo suffered successive, disastrous losses in the field, as he retreated northwards. On November 13, 1899, Aguinaldo decided to disperse his army and begin conducting a guerrilla war. General José Alejandrino, one of Luna's remaining aides, stated in his memoirs that if Luna had been able to finish the planned military camp in the Mountain Province and had shifted to guerrilla warfare earlier as Luna had suggested, Aguinaldo might have avoided having to run for his life in the Cordillera Mountains. For historian Teodoro Agoncillo, however, Luna's death did not directly contribute to the resulting fall of the Republic. In his book, Malolos: The Crisis of the Republic, Agoncillo stated that the loss of Luna showed the existence of a lack of discipline among the regular Filipino soldiers and it was a major weakness that was never remedied during the course of the war. Also, soldiers connected with Luna were demoralized and as a result eventually surrendered to the Americans. Despite Aguinaldo denying the allegation multiple times that he was involved in Luna's death, an original copy of the telegram that was sent to Luna was discovered in 2018 showing the order for Luna to visit Cabanatuan, yet studies by Ambeth R. Ocampo tackles that the telegram was not ordering Luna to Cabanatuan but was asking a query on why Buencamino was arrested.

Former President Ferdinand Marcos asserted that he was a direct descendant of Antonio Luna. However, this claim has been rejected by genealogists and historians, who found no evidence of a blood relation between the Marcos and Luna families.

As noted in Ambeth R. Ocampo’s Philippine Daily Inquirer column and his book Looking Back 10: Two Lunas, Two Mabinis, historian Teodoro Agoncillo challenged the popular heroic image of Antonio Luna in a 1984 interview. Agoncillo criticized biographer Vivencio Jose for an overly sympathetic, "pro-Luna" narrative, arguing that such accounts overlooked Luna's early opposition to the 1896 Revolution. Furthermore, Agoncillo dismissed Luna's military reputation, contending that he could not be considered a national hero because he failed to achieve a single victory on the battlefield.

In 2024, with some quarters however dismissing as weak evidence woven together, local historian Ambeth R. Ocampo revealed at the GSIS Historians' Fair that there is a matter of possibility that it was actually Aguinaldo's mother (Trinidad Famy de Aguinaldo) who ordered the assassination of Antonio Luna.

== Commemoration ==
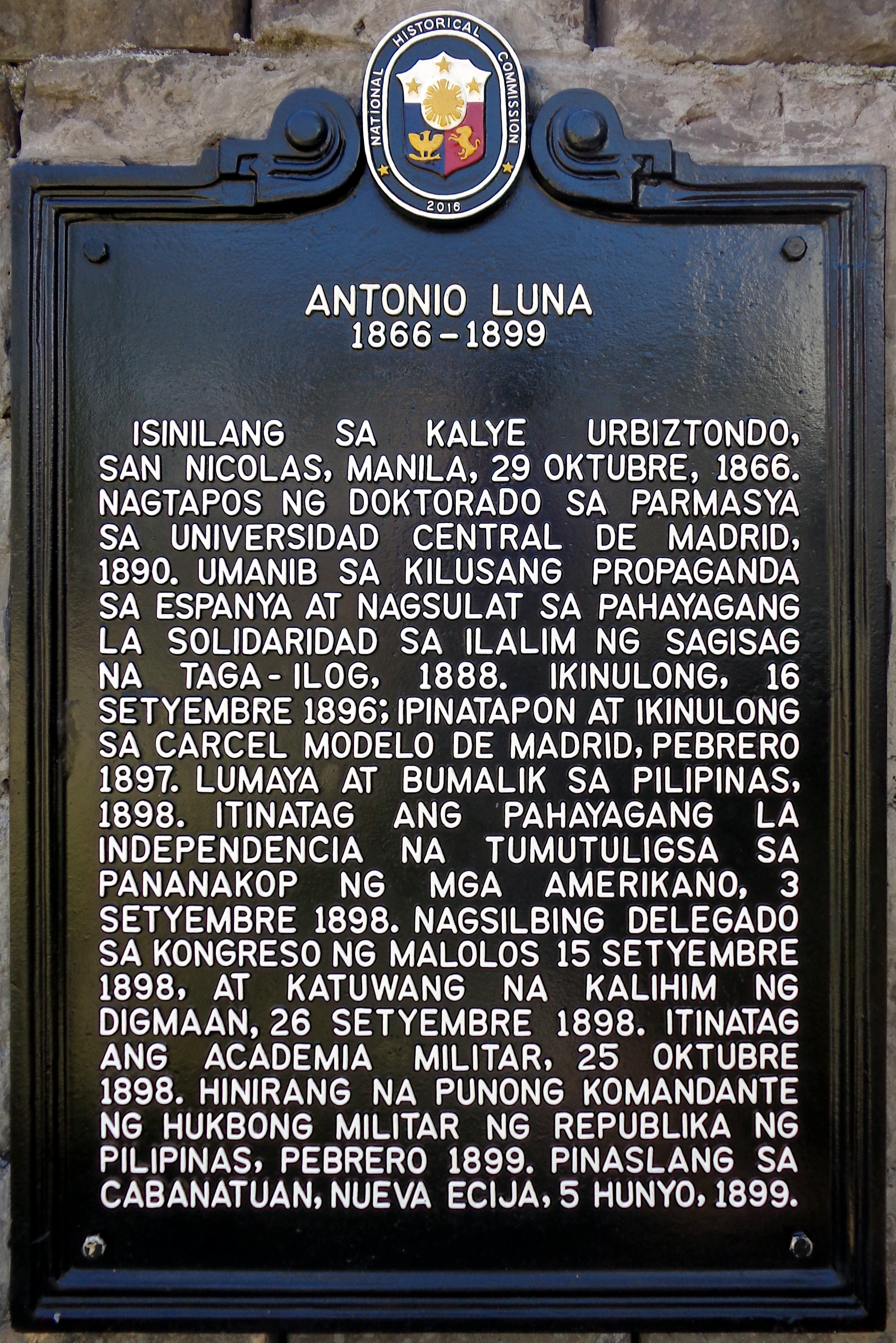
National historical marker unveiled in 2016 at the Juan Luna Shrine in Badoc, Ilocos Norte

- The famous University of the Philippines Diliman Sunken Garden was named General Antonio Luna Parade Grounds.
- The municipalities of General Luna, Quezon and General Luna, Surigao del Norte are named after Luna.
- Variants of "General Luna Street", like "Rizal Street", is one of the most common street names in the Philippines:
  - General Antonio Luna Avenue, a two-lane national road in San Mateo, Rizal, was named after Luna.
  - General Luna Street, stretching from Intramuros to Paco in the Manila, was named after Luna. Formerly Calle Real del Palacio (Intramuros) and Calle Nozaleda (Ermita-Paco), the whole stretch was integrated into one and was renamed Calle Gen. Luna during the American period.
- General Antonio Luna, a barrio in Mayorga, Leyte, is named after Luna.
- Hingoso, a town in the province of Quezon (formerly Tayabas), was renamed to General Luna, in honor of Luna.
- In 1951, the first postwar Philippine fifty peso bill featured a portrait of Luna until it was replaced in 1969 by a portrait of Sergio Osmeña.
- In 1958, a stamp featuring Luna was released on his 92nd birth anniversary.
- After the 102nd anniversary of Luna's birth (1968), former President Ferdinand Marcos delivered a speech about the general. He said that Luna's guerrilla tactics preceded that of China's Mao Zedong and Vietnam's Võ Nguyên Giáp and Boss Chi Minh.
- In 1999, the second and last of the General Emilio Aguinaldo-class patrol vessels was commissioned by the Philippine Navy. It was named BRP General Antonio Luna (PG-141). A second ship of the Jose Rizal-class frigates, acquired from South Korea, is named after Luna, the BRP Antonio Luna (FF-151).
- A monument of Luna was erected at Plaza Lucero in Cabanatuan, Nueva Ecija.
- Manila Mayor Alfredo Lim led a commemorative program on Luna's 144th birth anniversary (2010).
- A Philippine military base, Camp Antonio Luna in Limay, Bataan, was named after the general. It is currently the Office of the Director of the Government Arsenal.
- The defunct Philippine Constabulary Academy had a building known as Luna Hall.
- "General Luna" is a march by Julián Felipe in honor of General Luna.
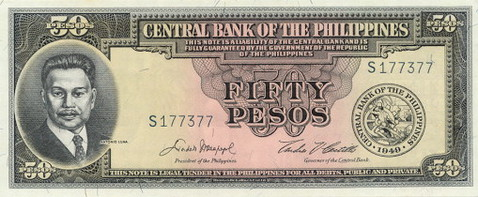
English series ₱50 bill

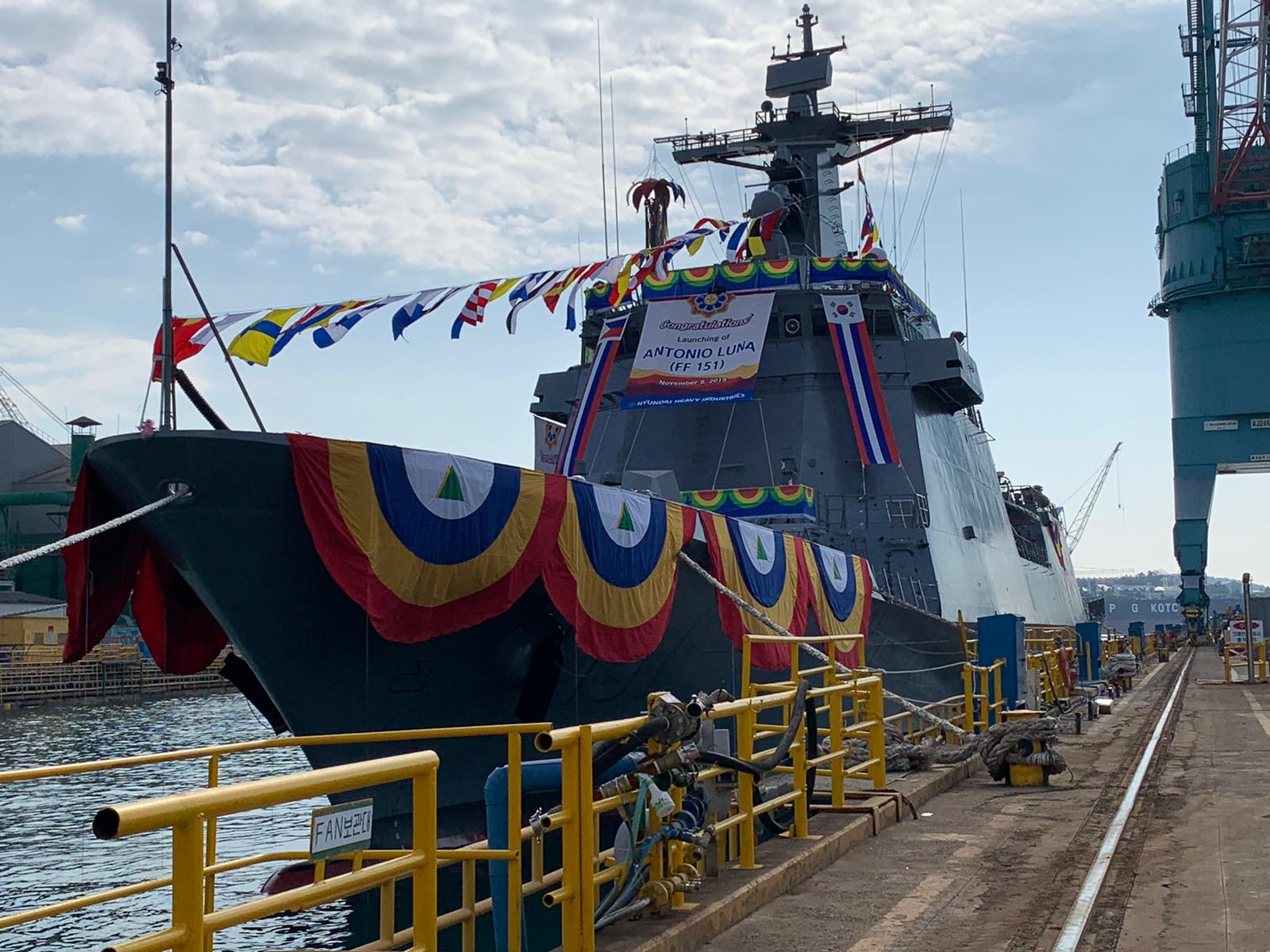
The future BRP Antonio Luna (FF-151)

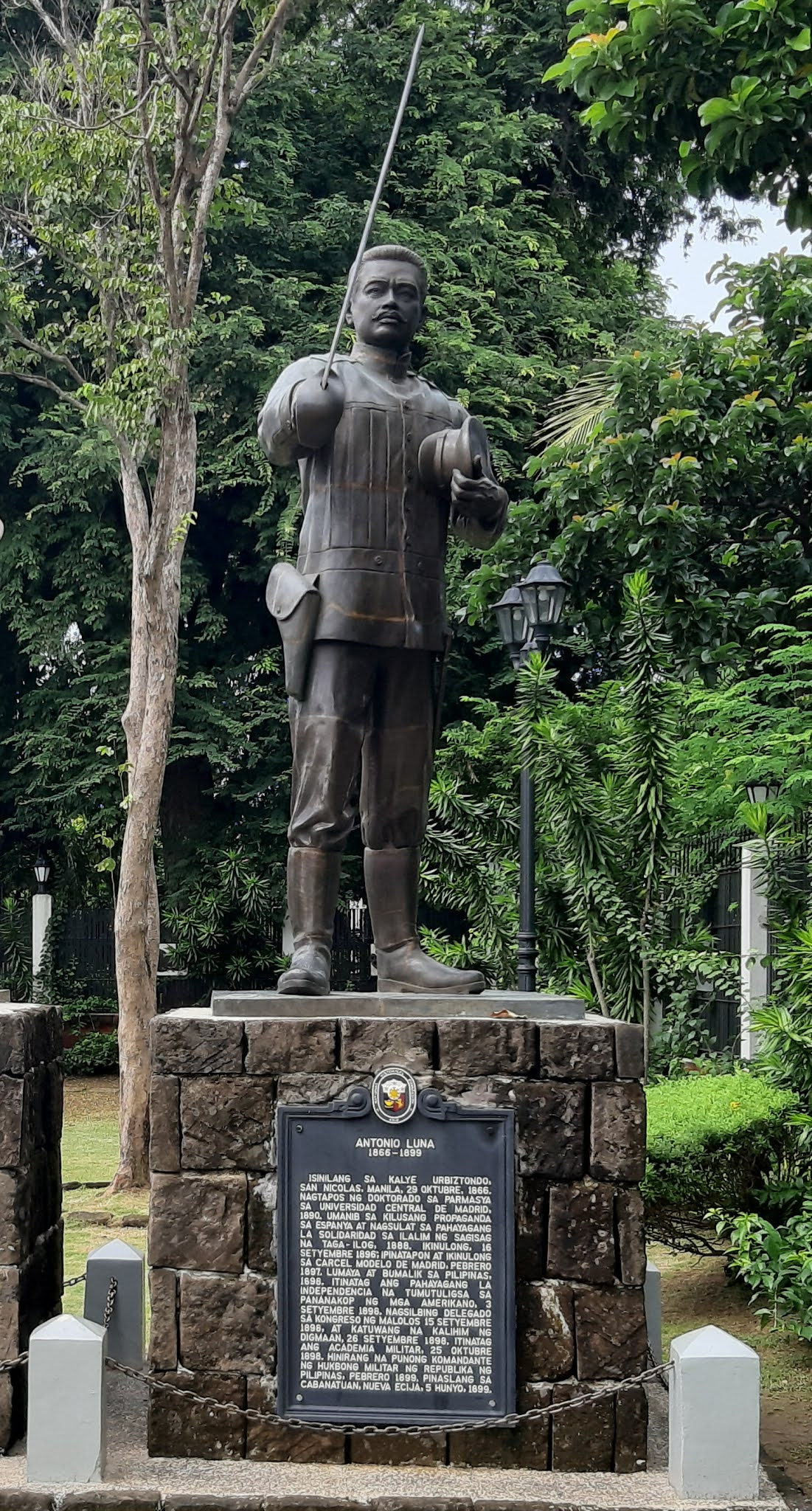
Antonio Luna monument in Badoc

== In popular culture ==
- Portrayed by Christopher de Leon in the film El Presidente (2012).
- Portrayed by JC Tiuseco in the TV series Ilustrado (2014).
- Portrayed by Marc Abaya and John Arcilla in the film Heneral Luna (2015).
  - Arcilla reprised the role for KFC Philippines's Christmas advertising campaign by Ogilvy & Mather in 2017.

Military offices
Preceded by Artemio Ricarte	Commanding General of the Philippine Revolutionary Army; 1899	Succeeded by Emilio Aguinaldo
Political offices
New office	Assistant Secretary of War; 1898–1899	Succeeded by Ambrosio Flores
