= Cordora: Lulutang Ka sa Sarili Mong Dugo =

1992 Filipino film starring Eddie Garcia

- Directed by: Francis "Jun" Posadas
- Written by: Tony Tacorda
- Produced by: Rosita Go; William Chua
- Starring: Eddie Garcia; Daniel Fernando; Roy Alvarez; Banjo Romero; Roi Vinzon; Tessie Tomas; Vanessa Escano; Jobelle Salvador; Jenny Roa
- Cinematography: Ver Dauz
- Edited by: Ever Ramos
- Music by: Mon del Rosario
- Production companies: First Films; EG Productions
- Release date: June 24, 1992
- Country: Philippines
- Language: Filipino
- Budget: ₱13 million

Cordora: Lulutang Ka sa Sarili Mong Dugo (lit. 'Cordora: You Will Float in Your Own Blood') is a 1992 Filipino action film about Gaudencio "Boy" M. Cordora, a chief inspector for the Philippine National Police. Directed by Francis "Jun" Posadas, it stars Eddie Garcia as the titular police inspector, alongside Daniel Fernando, Roi Vinzon, Roy Alvarez, Tessie Tomas, Fred Montilla, Dick Israel, Roberto Talabis, Zandro Zamora, and Banjo Romero.

Based on real events, the film was produced by First Films and was released on June 24, 1992, as part of the revived Manila Film Festival, winning the award for Best Picture, Best Actor, and Best Actress. Despite this, critic Justino Dormiendo criticized the film as a routine Filipino action film, and considered its "superhuman" depiction of Cordora to be the "depth of idiocy".

== Cast ==
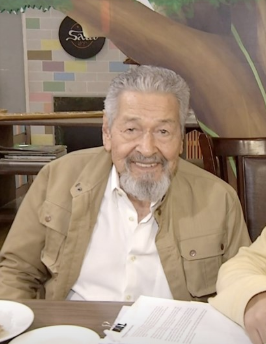
Eddie Garcia portrays the role of Gaudencio "Boy" M. Cordora

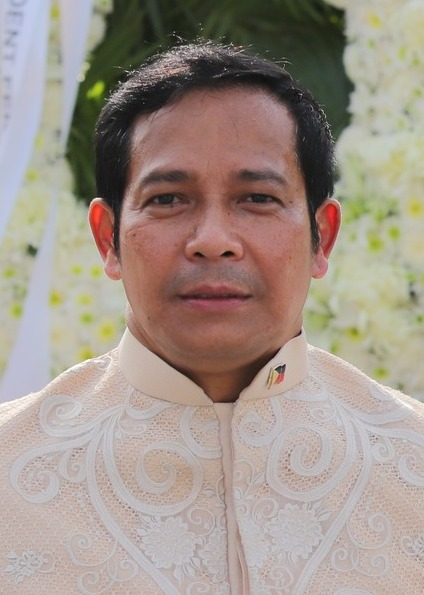
Daniel Fernando portrays the role of Ka George

- Eddie Garcia as P/Capt. Gaudencio "Boy" M. Cordora
- Daniel Fernando as Ka George
- Roi Vinzon Ex Sgt. Anselmo Garuda
- Roy Alvarez as Benjamin Cabrera/Ka Bernie
- Tessie Tomas
- Fred Montilla
- Dick Israel
- Roberto Talabis P/Maj. Francisco
- Zandro Zamora
- Banjo Romero
- Jobelle Salvador
- Vanessa Escano
- Jenny Roa
- Jess Lapid Jr. as Ben Tumbling
- Gabriel Romulo
- Rey Ravelo
- Jonathan Gabriel
- Raul "Boy Fernandez
- Edward Salvador
- William Magallanes Jr.
- Rey Lapid
- Leo Lazaro
- Robert Miller
- Jim Rosales
- Tony Tacorda
- Ben Dato
- Danny Rojo
- Marlo Escudero
- Ernie Zarate
- Ross Olgado
- Nanding Fernandez
- Vic Felife
- Flora Gasser

== Production ==
=== Pre-production ===
Preparations for Cordora lasted six months, with screenwriter-actor Tony Tacorda researching into Gaudencio Cordora's life.

=== Casting ===
Tessie Tomas, a comedian and actress mostly known for her imitations of Imelda Marcos, was cast in Cordora against type in a dramatic role as the wife of Gaudencio Cordora.

=== Filming ===
Principal photography took place over four months.

== Critical response ==
Justino Dormiendo, writing for the Manila Standard, gave Cordora a negative review. He criticized the film's screenplay and direction, noting that the storytelling offered nothing new for the action genre, "content as it is with the usual intramurals of bloody confrontations, domestic feuds and the law enforcer's death-defying feats". Dormiendo was also critical of the film's "superhuman" depiction of Cordora, stating that him surviving numerous gunshots to his body is "the depth of idiocy." For the actors, he was disappointed with Eddie Garcia's exaggerated acting and Tessie Tomas' "hardly believable" character, and expressed that with the exception of Roy Alvarez as the "gutsy" leader of the New People's Army, the supporting actors were the typical victims and villains of action films.
