= Battle of Marilao River =

1899 battle in the Philippine-American War

Battle in Marilao River
- Part of the Philippine–American War
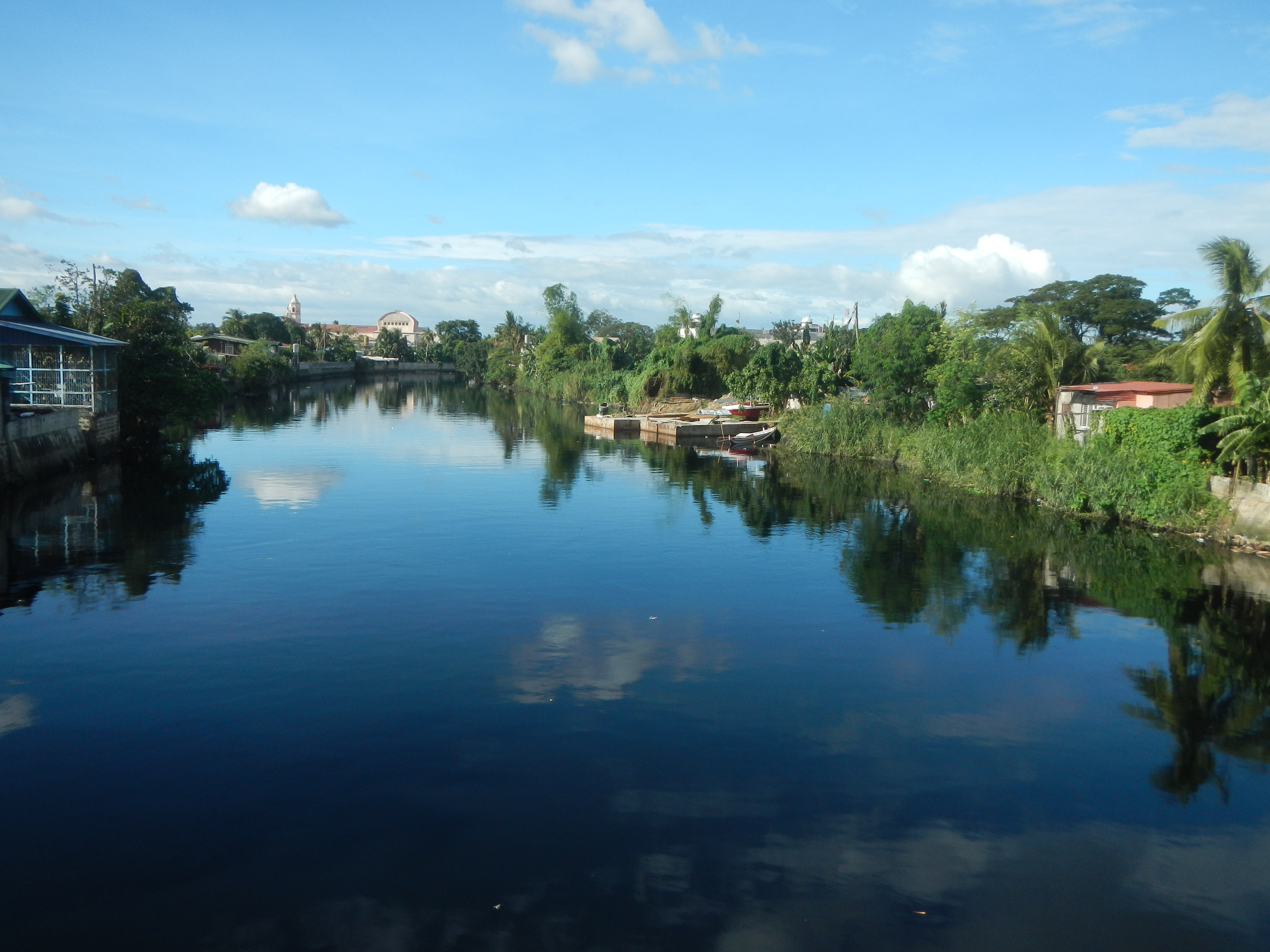
- Marilao River
Date	March 27, 1899
Location	Marilao, Bulacan, Philippines 14.76°N 120.95°E
Result	American victory

Belligerents
United States	Philippines

Commanders and leaders
Irving Hale	Emilio Aguinaldo

Units involved
1st South Dakota Infantry; 3rd U.S. Artillery	Unknown

Strength
Unknown	5,000 soldiers

Casualties and losses
14 dead 65 wounded	90 dead 30 taken prisoner

The Battle of Marilao River was fought on March 27, 1899, in Marilao, Bulacan, Philippines, during the Philippine–American War. It was one of the most celebrated river crossings of the war, wherein American forces crossed the Marilao River, which was 80 yards (73 m) wide and too deep to ford, while under fire.

== Background ==
After the failed Filipino counterattack to regain Manila on February 23, General Antonio Luna, the Chief of War Operations of the Philippine Republic, resigned his post on February 28 in protest to the reinstatement of the Kawit Battalion, which Luna had disarmed for insubordination during the earlier fighting around Caloocan. During Luna's absence, President Emilio Aguinaldo himself took over the military affairs, for the only time in the whole course of the war.

Meanwhile, the Americans, anticipating another counteroffensive from the Filipino side, took their time waiting for reinforcements under General Henry Ware Lawton. These arrived between March 10 and 23. By March 25, the Americans under General Arthur MacArthur, Jr. renewed their offensive against Caloocan and Polo, up to the ultimate drive to Malolos.

== Battle ==
The American force, after the Battle of Malinta, had advanced to Marilao on March 27. It was part of the campaign for the Capture of Malolos, the Philippine capital. The Filipino force was led by President Emilio Aguinaldo himself, commanding the organized forces of General Isidro Torres, General Pantaleon Garcia (who just came straight from Dagupan with a thousand riflemen) and Colonel Enrique Pacheco. The Americans fought with the Filipinos within the range of around 400 yards (370 m). Meanwhile, the Filipinos destroyed bridges to delay American artillery units. The Americans gained superiority in the battle only after severe fighting and the use of gunboats in the river that "made great execution" of Filipino soldiers. The official American account of the battle stated that Aguinaldo acted with a great sense of military strategy, averting a disastrous rout while succeeding in inflicting heavy damage on the Americans. The losses in the American drive to Malolos, the account also stated, had proven the Filipinos' effective fighting ability.

== Aftermath ==
On the American side, the American official history stated that 14 were killed and 65 more wounded. In the account of Teodoro Agoncillo, the battle resulted to 15 killed and 70 wounded. The Filipino side had sustained 90 dead.

After resting at Guiguinto, Bulacan from March 29 to 30, 1899, the American division under General Arthur MacArthur, Jr. pushed to the suburbs of Malolos by the afternoon of March 30. Malolos fell the next day, on March 31, since the Americans faced only token resistance. The American forces would rest in Malolos until April 1899, when they would have to shatter the Calumpit-Apalit Line at the Battle of Quingua and Battle of Calumpit.
