= Second Battle of Caloocan =

1899 battle between Philippine forces and the US

- Part of the Philippine–American War
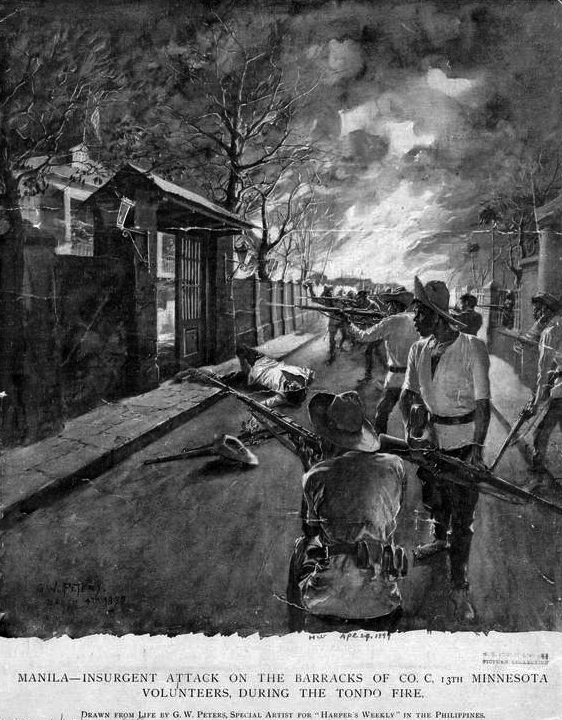
- Filipinos attack the barracks of the 13th Minnesota Volunteers.
Date	February 22–25, 1899
Location	Caloocan, Manila, Philippines
Result	American victory

Belligerents
United States	Philippine Republic

Commanders and leaders
Arthur MacArthur, Jr.	Antonio Luna; Mariano Llanera

Strength
15,000–20,000 soldiers 1 monitor	5,000 soldiers

Casualties and losses
5 killed, 34 wounded	500 killed and wounded (American Estimate)

The Second Battle of Caloocan (Filipino: Ikalawang Labanan sa Kalookan, Spanish: Segunda Batalla de Caloocan), alternately called the Second Battle of Manila, was fought from February 22 to 24, 1899, in Caloocan during the Philippine–American War. The battle featured a Filipino counterattack aimed at gaining Manila from the Americans. This counterattack failed to regain Manila mainly because of lack of coordination among Filipino units and lack of artillery support.

== Background ==
The Philippine–American War began on February 4, 1899, with the culmination of the Battle of Manila. Later, on February 10, Filipino forces regrouped in Caloocan and fought again with the American forces at the first Battle of Caloocan. The Americans won both engagements, but then Elwell S. Otis had Arthur MacArthur, Jr. wait before attacking Malolos. Noticing that the Americans had halted their offensive to reorganize, the Filipino forces, now under the command of General Antonio Luna, began finalizing their plans to counterattack. Apolinario Mabini, the political philosopher, highlighted the need to prepare thoroughly to ensure the success of the operation, stating that the battle's outcome would determine the fate of the Philippine Republic.

=== Filipino preparations ===
Luna's headquarters was established in Polo (now Valenzuela), and operations for the counterattack were prepared there. The troops directly under his command were organized into three brigades. The West Brigade was under General Pantaleon Garcia, the Center Brigade was under General Mariano Llanera, and the East Brigade was under Colonel Maximino Hizon. The plan envisioned by Luna and his army staff was to effect a union of forces from the north and south of Manila with sandatahanes inside the city. The other forces that were to attack simultaneously with Luna's troops were General Licerio Gerónimo's Morong Battalion from the east, General Pío del Pilar's brigade and Miguel Malvar's Batangas Brigade from the south. Luna even requested the battle-hardened Tinio Brigade in Northern Luzon. It had more than 1,900 soldiers. However, Aguinaldo gave only ambiguous answers. The total Filipino force amounted between 5,000 men. The defending American force had 15,000 to 20,000 men in Manila and its suburbs.

The Western Brigade was composed of the following battalions: the Manila Battalion, under Colonels Pacheco and Soriano, was to attack via Tinajeros; the Salvador Battalion, Colonel Maximino Hizon's Pampanga Battalion, and the 5th Malolos Battalion were to advance south and occupy the tramway station; the Kawit Battalion was to occupy the Meisic police station; and a separate column under Paco Roman, led by Torres and Pajarillo, was to enter via Vitas, supported by seventy sandatahanes. The Center Brigade consisted of five companies of the Nueva Ecija Battalion, supported by two companies of sharpshooters. The East Brigade was composed of a column of the Pampanga Battalion, led by Major Canlas, who were to enter via La Loma, and the Pangasinan Battalion, which was to advance via Balic-balic toward Sampaloc.

== Battle ==
At 9 pm on February 22, fire broke out at the brothel in Santa Cruz, Manila, followed by another in Tondo, Manila. The fires signaled the beginning of the Filipino counterattack. Around 9 pm, Aguinaldo received a telegram concerning the fire. The local firefighters refused to act, so the Americans used European volunteers, supported by the Provost Guard and the 13th Minnesota, 2nd Oregon, and the 23rd Infantry in Tondo, when 500 Filipinos troops occupied the northern part of the city. Panicked refugees fled from the flames in Tondo and as the market in Binondo caught fire after midnight. As a result, it took three hours for the fires to be brought under control. At around 10 pm, armed Filipinos under Colonel Francisco Roman entered Tondo and confronted the surprised American troops.

Confusion, however, did not rest on the American side alone. The Filipinos also succumbed to indecision. Colonel Luciano Lucas, who led the Cuerpo de Armas Blancas within the city of Manila and was under Luna's direct command, responded immediately after hearing the signal for attack. His objective was to march into the Meisic police station, which the Americans had turned into a barracks. However, en route Lucas' troops were met by a large American contingent at Azcarraga Street. Thinking of retreat, Lucas had reconsidered the belief that it was better to die fighting than die burning. The houses at their rear were already on fire, so he ordered his men to attack the Americans with only daggers in their hands. In the ensuing fight three Filipinos and eight Americans were killed.

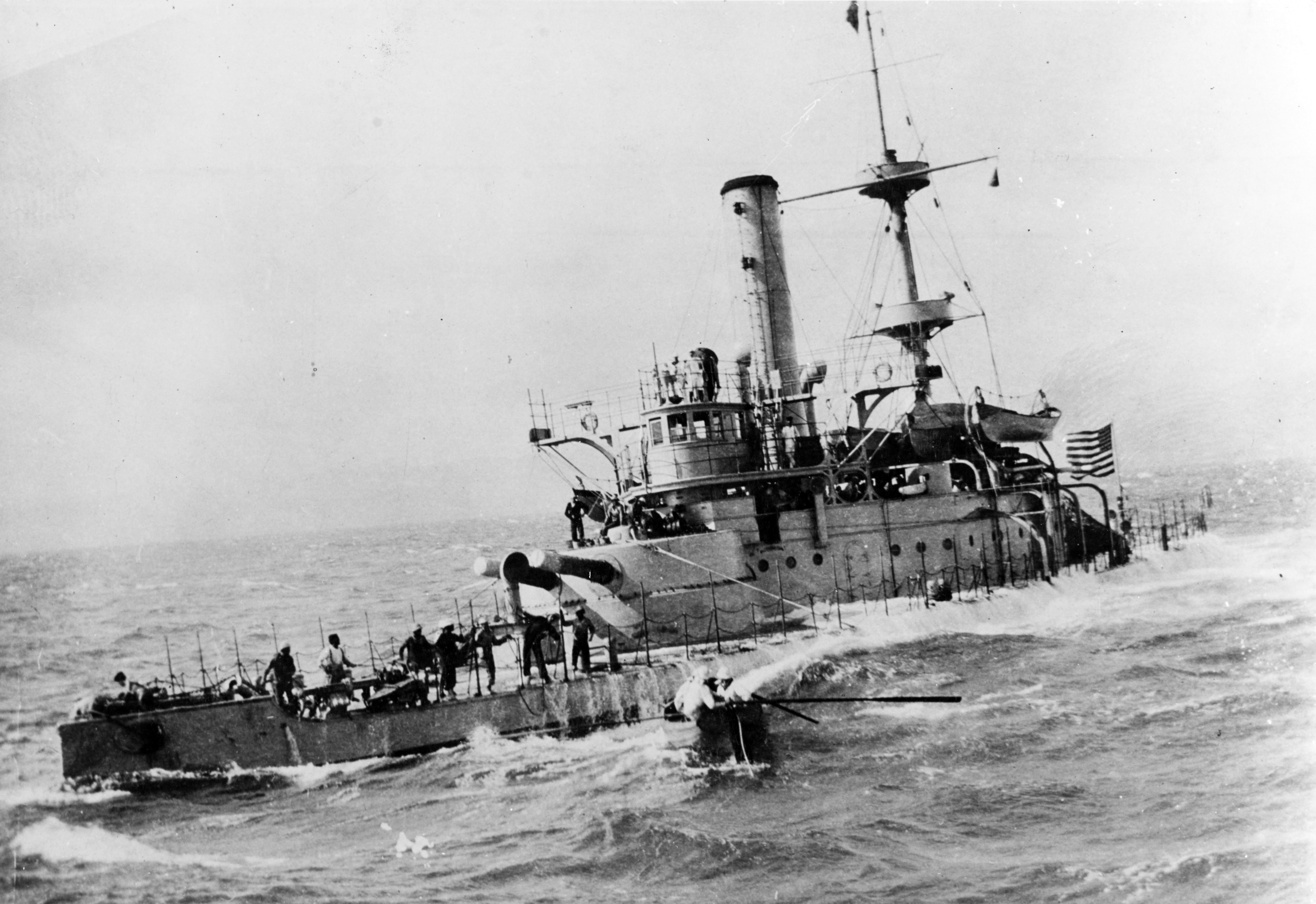
The USS Monadnock crossing the Pacific Ocean during the Spanish–American War

During the course of the battle, Luna did his best to keep personal participation in the field. At dawn of February 23, the Filipinos opened their attack by firing their cannons against the Americans. Luna managed to secure a Krupp Rifled breech loader to provide artillery support for his men. However, while the advancing Filipinos attempted to break the American line in Caloocan, the Americans were able to coordinate their positions with the USS Monadnock. The ship's twin turrets fired 10-inch shells that set fire to a number of Filipino houses that broke up the Filipino attack, forcing them to fall back to take cover.

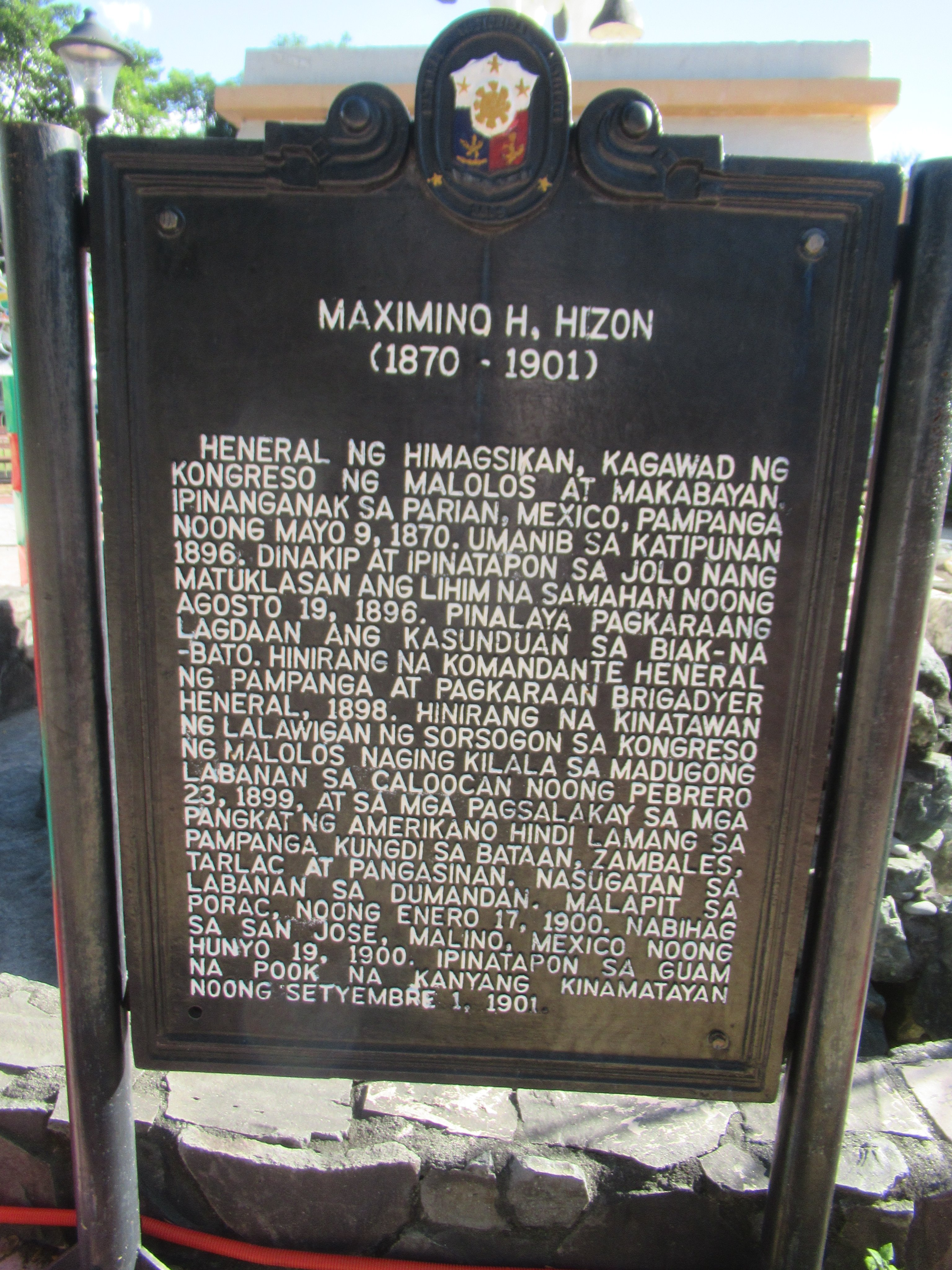
February 23, 1899 (Maximino Hipolito Hizon "Bayani ng Mexico")

This setback was made worse by the poor coordination between the regular Filipino army and the Sandatahanes. A lack of ammunition had also affected some units, including the troops under Colonel Roman. Nevertheless, Garcia's troops had reached the planned points of occupation in Manila, and at that point he believed that Manila would soon fly the Filipino flag. At that point, however, Filipino fortunes wavered. Two companies, totaling about 400 men, of the Pampanga troops under Major Canlas made a rapid advance and placed La Loma under siege. When the Pampanga troops ran out of ammunition, four companies (around 800) of Kawit troops were ordered to link up with the Pampanga troops and launch a joint attack on the Americans entrenched in La Loma. The Kawit commander, Captain Janolino, did not obey the order stating that he would only obey orders from President Aguinaldo. As a result, the battle in that sector was lost, and later this incident was singled out by both Luna and General Ambrosio Flores, Luna's assistant as Director of War, as being the main factor in denying the Filipinos victory that day.

By the end of February 23, the Filipinos had managed to secure Sampaloc, Binondo and Tondo (by Generals Pío del Pilar, Geronimo and Colonel Hizon). The Kawit Battalion under Captain Pedro Janolino had secured Meisic and American troops in Caloocan, numbering around 6,000, were under siege by Filipino troops under Llanera and Garcia.

The next day, the Filipinos fought even more fiercely than they had the day before. The continued fighting aroused concern amongst the American commanders who called for reinforcements, cabling General Henry Ware Lawton to expedite his move to Manila from Colombo. However, in general, the Filipinos were retreated to their original positions. Weak links between Filipino units enabled the Americans to intercept a number of telegrams and disrupt their communications. This resulted in poor coordination and, coupled with poor discipline among some units such as the Kawit Battalion and the Sandatahanes, this ultimately let to the failure of the counterattack. The Tondo pocket was cleared, the defenders fell back and resistance collapsed.

== Aftermath ==
Thirty-nine among the Americans and 500 among the Filipinos were counted as casualties. Following the battle, Luna disarmed the Kawit Battalion for their insubordination. But Aguinaldo countered the act by putting them in a new command, that of Major Ramos. Upon learning of the reinstatement of the Kawit Battalion, Luna offered his resignation on February 28. The Americans also acted in their own area by banning the entry of armed Filipinos in Manila, and instituting a system of passage cards for everyone entering the city. As the Americans ceased operations while they waited for reinforcements to arrive, a period of comparative peace followed after the battle, except for limited activity by small bands of Filipinos guerrillas. Lawton's reinforcements finally began to arrive between March 10 and 23.
