= Ben Tumbling =

Filipino criminal

- Born: Benjamin M. Garcia; June 7, 1957; Malabon, Rizal, Philippines
- Died: March 13, 1981 (aged 23); Santa Cruz, Manila, Philippines
- Cause of death: Gunshot wounds

Benjamin M. Garcia, also known as Ben Tumbling (June 7, 1957 – March 13, 1981) was a Filipino stuntman who later became one of the Philippines' most wanted gangsters.

Tumbling was killed in a shootout with the police operatives reportedly led by then Intelligence Chief, Col. Vicente Vinarao, in Manila in the early morning of March 13, 1981.

Retired police officer, former Lt. Edgar Gimao, one of those claiming to be the one who killed Tumbling, recounted the events in an interview by the Philippine Daily Inquirer in 2000. According to him, he saw Tumbling inside an open barangay hall near Rizal Avenue during surveillance. The four-man team later regrouped at a nearby hotel, boarded a taxi, and headed straight to the hall wherein a brief shootout ensued inside. He shot Tumbling to death while being injured along with Maj. Romeo Clavio, while Insp. Reynaldo "Boy" Chico unsuccessfully fired his gun, and another did nothing. Vinarao though was not mentioned in Gimao's testimony.

Then First Lady and Metro Manila governor Imelda Marcos awarded medals of efficiency to the four who were also given spot promotions, while then WPD chief Narciso Cabrera and other officials received honors as well.

Gimao said that his former colleagues at the WPD made false claims that Chico, not him, supposedly killed Tumbling. Chico was portrayed in a 1997 biographical film, and by the time of Gimao's interview, was involved in a shooting incident in Manila. Clavio had also been reported as the one who did.

== In popular culture ==
- Portrayed by Lito Lapid in a 1985 film, Ben Tumbling: A People's Journal Story.
- Portrayed by Jess Lapid Jr. in a 1992 Manila Film Festival entry, Cordora: Lulutang Ka sa Sarili Mong Dugo.
- In a controversial 1997 film Boy Chico (Hulihin si Ben Tumbling) by Viva Films, Ben was portrayed by Ace Espinosa; Chico, by Joko Diaz.
- Another life story about him was featured in a 2012 film, Alyas Ben Tumbling.
- Featured in History with Lourd in 2014.
