= Sandatahan =

Unit of the Philippine Republican Army

The Sandatahanes (plural, from Tagalog sandatahan), also known as bolomen, were lightly armed, often irregular units within the Philippine Republican Army. It was officially called Cuerpo de Armas Blancas (Knife Corps in English). Typically equipped with a bolo knife, they served primarily to support the regular forces. Dressed as farmers or civilians during the day, the Sandatahanes engaged in guerrilla activities at night, including ambushing small detachments of enemy soldiers, sabotage, and, most importantly, supplying the regular army with intelligence on enemy positions and movements. The unit traces its history back to the lightly or even unarmed Katipunan revolutionaries during the war of independence from Spain.

The Sandatahanes played significant roles in the opening phases of the Philippine–American War, notably in the Battle of Manila in 1899 and the Second Battle of Caloocan. Sleeper cells in the suburbs around Manila were active during the planned uprising scheduled for February 15, 1899. According to a telegram issued by General Luna a few days after hostilities began on February 5, 1899, the operation called for the militiamen of Trozo, Binondo, Quiapo, and Sampaloc to follow up the initial attack by sharpshooters from Tondo and Santa Ana. The militiamen of Paco, Ermita, Malate, Santa Cruz, and San Miguel were instructed to join the attack once the fighting had become widespread, which was expected to be around midnight.

== Notable units ==
A regiment was already active in Tondo and Binondo between December 1898 and January 9, 1899. It is believed to have originally been organized to oppose Spanish colonial rule. Under the leadership of Colonel Luciano Lucas, the unit operated independently from the main Filipino forces stationed outside the city. Although it was intended to support the Malolos government's objectives, it functioned with considerable autonomy. The exact size of the regiment is unclear, but correspondence from Colonel Lucas suggests it was a substantial force. Contemporary accounts offer differing estimates, with Dean C. Worcester suggesting 6,330 men and General Otis reporting it to be around 10,000.

The unit’s pre-war role was somewhat unclear. Colonel Lucas described its purpose as collecting funds from wealthy residents of Manila, protecting against American abuses, and carrying out various essential tasks. He emphasized that its goal was to ensure peace and security for native Filipinos in Manila, collecting only enough funds to sustain its operations.

On February 17, 1899, while en route to participate in an offensive, the regiment captured a certain Gregorio Martinez, who had informed the Americans of their activities. Fearing an imminent counterattack, the unit abandoned its mission and discarded their weapons. The eventual fate of Martinez is not documented.

The regiment's activities also included the abduction of Filipinos who were seen interacting with Americans, according to reports from a Filipino informant identified as "Pipi." However, the unit’s effectiveness diminished as Filipino forces were driven further from Manila and additional American reinforcements arrived.

During the Second Battle of Caloocan, guerrilla fighters from the regiment infiltrated American lines disguised as women and attempted to set fire to San Fernando de Dilao, a suburb of Manila. While they managed to ignite some fires, the operation was quickly suppressed by American provost guards and hindered by a lack of coordination and local support.

== Organization ==
Several units were formed between 1899 and 1901, namely:

- Guerilla de Voluntarios, an all-volunteer guerilla unit
- Guerilla Montada, a mounted guerilla unit
- Guerilla Navotas, a guerilla unit that operated in and around the town of Navotas
- Zona de Manila, a guerilla unit that operated within the city of Manila and participated in the Battle of Manila in 1899 and the Second Battle of Caloocan

== Bibliography ==
- Taylor, John R. M.; United States Bureau Of Insular Affairs (1903), Compilation of Philippine insurgent records, U.S. Government Printing Office
