= Pampanga Battalion =

Unit of the Philippine Republican Army

The Pampanga Battalion was a military unit within the Philippine Republican Army, composed of enlisted Filipino soldiers mainly from Bacolor, Pampanga.

It was stationed in the Fourth Zone of Manila in early 1899, under the command of General Pantaleon Garcia and Colonel Enrique Pacheco and saw action in the Battle of Manila in 1899. Elements of the battalion were also involved in the First and Second Battle of Caloocan.
