= History with Lourd =

Philippine documentary show

- Tagline : Tsismis Noon, Kasaysayan Ngayon
- Genre: Documentary
- Created by: TV5
- Developed by: News5
- Directed by: R.A. Rivera; Jun Sabayton
- Presented by: Lourd de Veyra
- Country of origin: Philippines
- Original language: Filipino
- No. of seasons: 6
- No. of episodes: 81 (list of episodes)

Production
- Executive producer: Analisa Puod
- Running time: 30 minutes

Original release
- Network: TV5
- Release: October 17, 2013 – April 26, 2016

History with Lourd is a Philippine historical comedy documentary show broadcast by TV5 and AksyonTV. Hosted by Lourd de Veyra, it aired from October 17, 2013, to April 26, 2016.

== Plot ==
The show solely focuses on discovering the different aspects of Philippine history and debunking famous historical myths with topics focusing in either political, personal, or social life and the show mixing both history lessons with comedic flair. It also featured interviews from historians, professors, and politicians (former and current).

== Host ==
- Lourd de Veyra
- Rodolfo "Jun" Sabayton

== Book ==
In 2018, the show's episodes were published in book format.

== Awards and nominations ==
Year	Award-Giving Body	Category	Recipient	Result	Source
2017	2nd Guild of Educators, Mentors, and Students (GEMS)	Best Program Host	Lourd de Veyra	Won	
2017	31st PMPC Star Awards for Television	Best Television Program	History	Nominated	
2016	30th PMPC Star Awards for Television	Best Television Program	History	Nominated	
2016	14th Gawad Tanglaw Awards	Best Educational Program	History with Lourd	Won	
2015	29th PMPC Star Awards for Television	Best Television Program	History	Nominated	
2015	5th EdukCircle Awards	Best Educational Show Host	Lourd de Veyra	Won	
2014	National Commission on Culture and the Arts	Best Culture-Based Documentation Host	Lourd de Veyra	Won	
2014	8th Hildegarde Awards	Outstanding Achievement in the Broadcast Media (Television)	History with Lourd	Won	

== See also ==
- News5
- List of TV5 (Philippine TV network) original programming
