= Paco Román =

Filipino revolutionary leader (1869–1899)

Koronel Paco Román
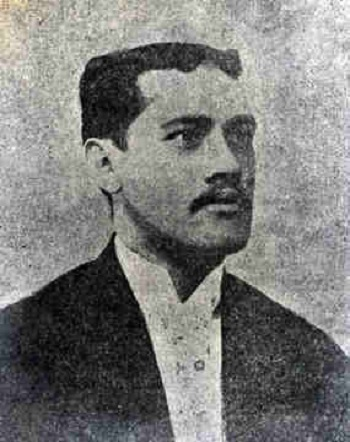
- Román c. 1899
- Born: Francisco Román y Velásquez; October 4, 1869; Alcala, Cagayan, Captaincy General of the Philippines
- Died: June 5, 1899 (aged 29); Cabanatuan, Nueva Ecija, First Philippine Republic
- Cause of death: Assassination
- Alma mater: Ateneo Municipal de Manila
- Spouse: Juliana Piqueras
- Relatives: José Palma, Rafael Palma (first cousins)
- Military career
- Allegiance: Philippine Republic; Spanish Empire
- Branch: Philippine Republican Army; Spanish Army
- Rank: Koronel (Republican Army)
- Conflicts: Philippine Revolution; Philippine–American War; Battle of Caloocan; Second Battle of Caloocan

Francisco Román y Velásquez (October 4, 1869 – June 5, 1899) was a Filipino soldier who became a revolutionary during Philippine Revolution and Philippine–American War. Roman had the rank of a colonel in the Philippine Revolutionary Army, and served as aide-de-camp of Lieutenant General Antonio Luna. When Luna was assassinated in Cabanatuan, Nueva Ecija, Román attempted to save him but he was also shot to death by Emilio Aguinaldo's presidential guards.

== Personal life ==
Francisco Román was born on October 4, 1869, in Alcala, Cagayan to Pelagia Velásquez, a Tagalog, and José Román, a Spanish national. Pelagia was the sister of Hilaria Velásquez, the mother of José and Rafael Palma. Paco's father, José, was a licensee of the tobacco monopoly system then implemented in the province. The family moved to Manila where the elder Román established a factory. Francisco then studied at Ateneo Municipal de Manila and eventually pursued studies in Hong Kong.

Roman married Juliana Piqueras, whom he had two children, Juan and Carmen.

== Philippine independence struggle ==
Francisco Román assumed his father's business after the latter died and secretly donated to the revolutionary cause. Being the son of a Spanish national, he sided with the colonial government and was believed to have volunteered in the Spanish cavalry in order to not be suspected of aiding the revolutionary forces. At the outbreak of the Philippine–American War, Roman joined General Antonio Luna's forces and rose to the ranks to become a colonel and Luna's aide-de-camp.

Román led what came to be known as the Second Battle of Caloocan where his forces were able to push the invading American forces back to Azcárraga Street in Manila.

== Assassination ==
While setting up his mountain headquarters in Bayambang, Pangasinan, General Antonio Luna received a telegram on June 4, 1899, from Cabanatuan, Nueva Ecija summoning him to a conference with the President Emilio Aguinaldo. Román, together with Captain Eduardo Rusca, Major Manuel Bernal, Captain José Bernal, Colonel Simeon A. Villa of the Medical Corps, and 25 cavalrymen, accompanied Luna to Cabanatuan.

The next day, en route to Cabanatuan, a broken bridge posed to delay the entire party. Luna, accompanied by only Román and Rusca, decided to proceed immediately to the parish convent which was used as Aguinaldo's office after moving the government's capital from Malolos.

At around three in the afternoon on June 5, 1899, Luna, Román, and Rusca arrived at the convent of Cabanatuan, with Luna proceeding alone to meet Aguinaldo. Upon hearing gunshots, Román and Rusca rushed to Luna’s aid. However, Román was killed by Aguinaldo’s personal guards from Kawit, Cavite, while Rusca was severely wounded and eventually surrendered to the attacking soldiers.

Román was buried together with Luna at the town cemetery with military honors. However, the whereabouts of his body was lost, as Luna's was later exhumed and transferred. Aguinaldo denied any knowledge in the assassination of Luna and Román, but acknowledged his failure to persecute the people behind their deaths.

== In popular culture ==
- Portrayed by Rogelio Aldo Yadao in the film, El Presidente (2012).
- Portrayed by Joem Bascon in the film, Heneral Luna (2015).
