= Tinio Brigade =

Philippine military unit (1898–1901)

- Brigada Tinio
- Active: 1898 - 1901
- Disbanded: April 29, 1901
- Country: (First Philippine Republic) Philippines
- Allegiance: (First Philippine Republic) Philippine Republic
- Branch: Philippine Republican Army
- Type: Infantry
- Role: Light Infantry
- Size: 1,900 - 2,400
- Part of: Northern Luzon Forces
- Garrison/HQ: Vigan, Ilocos Sur
- Engagements: Battle of Bangued Battle of Vigan Battle of San Jacinto, Pangasinan

Commanders
- Organizer and Commander: Manuel Tinio
- Notable commanders: Casimiro Tinio Benito Tinio Blas Villamor

The Tinio Brigade was a military unit within the Philippine Republican Army, originally comprising Tagalog settlers from Nueva Ecija and later including various ethnolinguistic groups such as Ilocanos, Abreños, Igorots, and Itnegs, with some Spaniards. Formed by Manuel Tinio, the brigade was one of the last organized units resisting American occupation in northern Philippines during the Philippine–American War.

In June 1898, President Emilio Aguinaldo ordered Manuel Tinio to form an expeditionary army and march north to lay siege to remaining Spanish forces in the Ilocos region. Initially led by Colonel Casimiro Tinio, the brigade prepared for conflict with the Americans by constructing defensive trenches in Pangasinan and La Union. At the start of the Philippine–American War, the brigade had approximately 1,904 soldiers.

On November 7, 1899, the brigade clashed with American forces in San Jacinto, Pangasinan, resulting in casualties on both sides. After disbanding and reorganizing as guerrilla units following a national council of war on November 13, 1899, they played a key role in delaying American pursuit of President Aguinaldo.

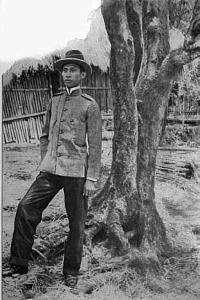
Brigadier General Manuel Tinio organized and commanded the brigade.

On December 4, 1899, the brigade, comprising 400 riflemen and bolomen, fought in Vigan, suffering over 40 Filipino casualties and causing 8 American fatalities. By December 3, 1899, General Young and Lt. Col. Howze had reached Tangadan Pass, defended by 1,060 Filipino soldiers under Lt. Col. Blas Villamor. The pass was overrun, leading to a Filipino retreat. The brigade continued to resist by fortifying Mt. Bimmauya and establishing an arsenal, but was gradually weakened, with many members captured.

In January 1901, the brigade's arsenal at Barbar was captured. In February, Brigadier General James Franklin Bell intensified repression, destroying food supplies and evacuating populations to prevent guerrilla support. On February 26, 1901, General Tinio launched his last attack in Sta. Maria. Bell's harsh policies led to widespread devastation and many guerrillas surrendering by March.

On March 25, 1901, the brigade's leadership decided to wait for President Aguinaldo's decision. With Aguinaldo's capture on March 23 and his call for surrender, General Tinio complied, surrendering on April 29, 1901, effectively ending the brigade as an operational unit.

== Bibliography ==
- Taylor, John R. M.; United States Bureau Of Insular Affairs (1903), Compilation of Philippine insurgent records, U.S. Government Printing Office
- Ochosa, Orlino A. (1989), The Tinio Brigade: Anti-American Resistance in the Ilocos Provinces 1899–1901, Quezon City: New Day Publishers
- Scott, William Henry (1986), Ilocano Responses to American Aggression 1900–1901, Quezon City: New Day Publishers
- Aguinaldo, Emilio (2005) [1899], True Version of the Philippine Revolution, University of Michigan Library
