= Battle of Caloocan =

1899 battle of the Philippine–American War

Coordinates: 14°39′N 120°58′E

- Part of the Philippine–American War
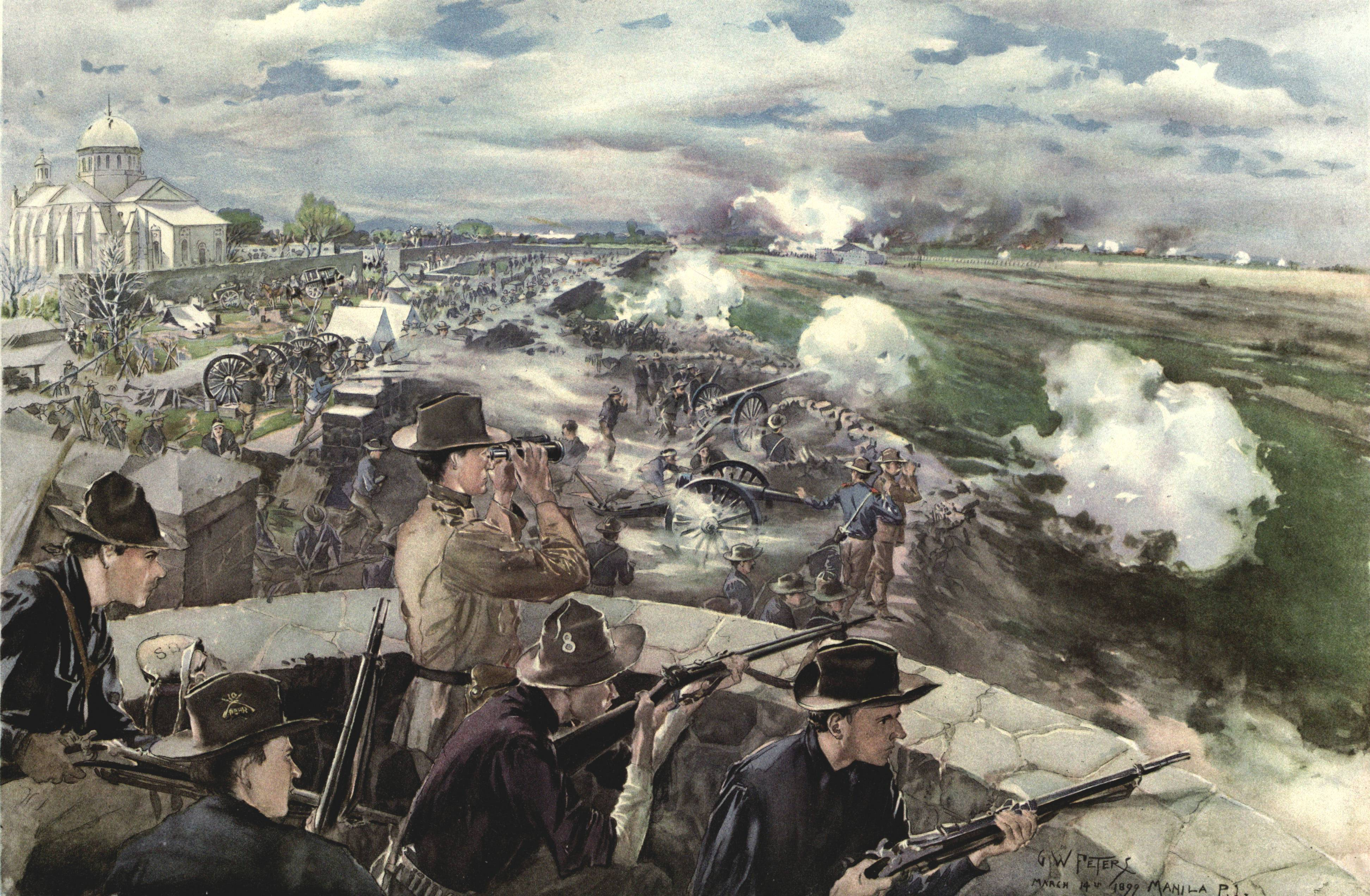
- Maj. Gen. Arthur MacArthur Jr., with a battery of Utah Artillery and the 10th Pennsylvania Volunteers
Date	February 10, 1899
Location	Caloocan, Manila
Result	American victory

Belligerents
United States	Philippine Republic

Commanders and leaders
Arthur MacArthur Jr. Harrison Gray Otis; Frederick Funston	Antonio Luna; Paco Román

Strength
3,312; 1 protected cruiser 1 monitor	~5,000

Casualties and losses
6 killed 61 wounded	Unknown

The Battle of Caloocan was fought on February 10, 1899 between American forces under the command of Major General Arthur MacArthur Jr. and Filipino forces led by Brigadier-general Antonio Luna. One of the opening engagements of the Philippine–American War, the battle resulted in the Americans capturing the city of Caloocan from the Filipinos as part of an offensive planned and led by MacArthur. Occurring only five days after the American victory at Manila on February 5, the engagement once again demonstrated the military superiority that the American military held over the Philippine Republican Army. However, it was not the decisive strike that MacArthur had hoped for, and the war continued for another three years.

From 1896 to 1898, Filipino revolutionaries led by the Katipunan waged the Philippine Revolution against Spanish colonial rule. Despite providing assistance to the revolutionaries, the United States decided to annex the Philippines in the 1898 Treaty of Paris. On February 4, American troops fired on a Filipino detachment, sparking war between the U.S. and the newly-established Philippine Republic. Over the following days, American commanders in the region made plans to attack Caloocan. On February 10, American forces launched a three-hour bombardment of the settlement; immediately afterwards, a large U.S. force advanced towards Caloocan. Aided by a surprise attack, American troops successfully stormed the city.

The capture of Caloocan led significant sections of the Manila-Dagupan Railroad along with large amounts of its rolling stock to fall into the hands of American forces. However, as the majority of Luna's 5,000 troops were able to retreat intact and soon regrouped elsewhere, the battle did not have the decisive impact that American military commanders had initially hoped for. On February 22, the Filipinos launched a counterattack on American positions on Manila but withdrew after two days of fighting. Allegations later surfaced that American troops had summarily executed prisoners of war during the capture of Caloocan, which the US Senate's Committee on the Philippines investigated before choosing not to further pursue the matter.

== Background ==
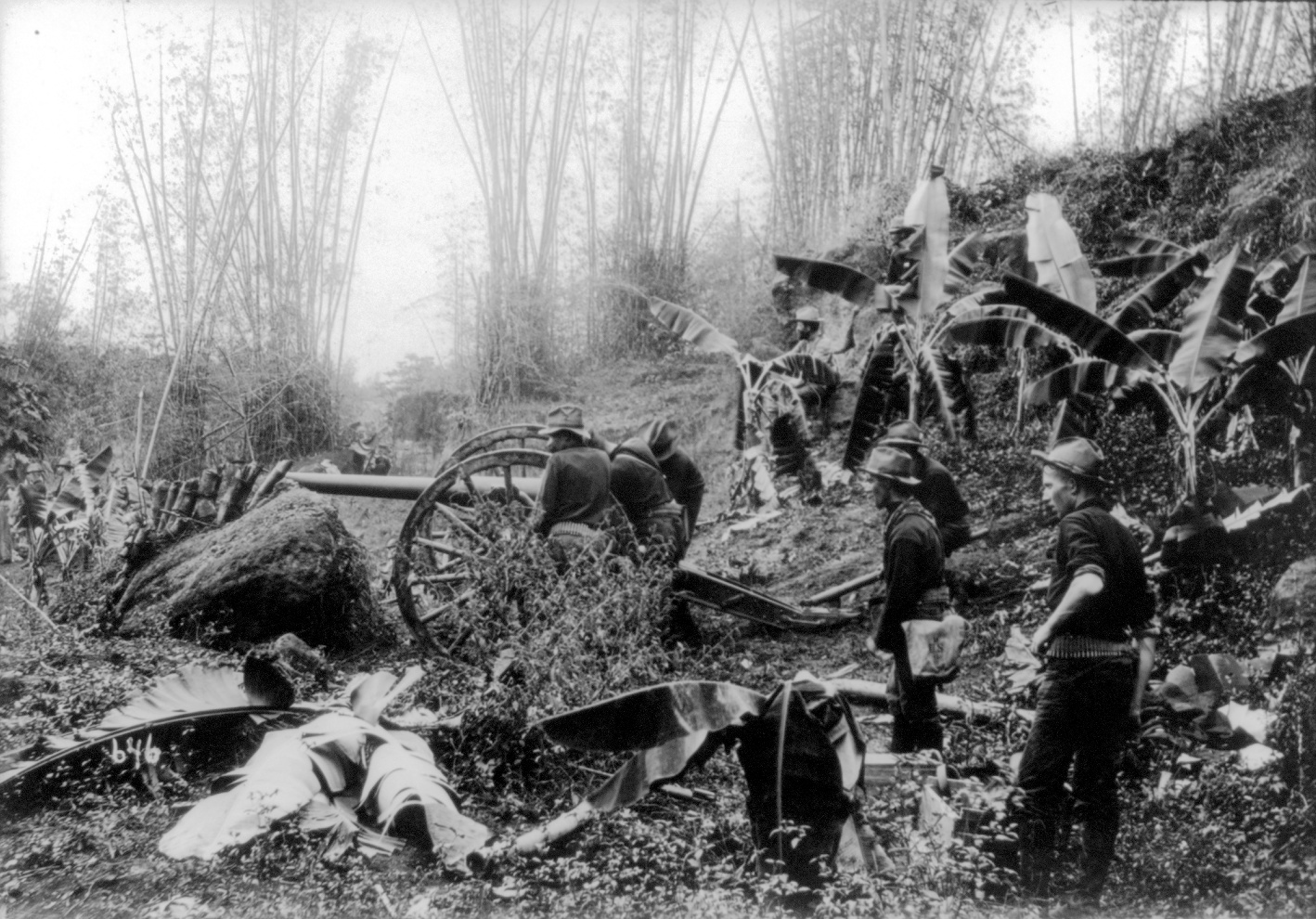
American troops near Manila, c. 1899

In 1896, Filipino revolutionary organizations led by the Katipunan began waging the Philippine Revolution, a war of independence against Spanish colonial rule. The United States declared war on Spain in 1898, and proceeded to provide assistance to the Filipinos in the closing stages of the Philippine Revolution. On June 12, 1898, the Filipino revolutionary leader Emilio Aguinaldo issued the Philippine Declaration of Independence, which proclaimed the independence of the Philippines. However, the American government, under the McKinley administration, had decided to annex the Philippines. In the 1898 Treaty of Paris, which ended the Spanish–American War, Spain agreed to cede control of the Philippines to the U.S.

The American military sent the Philippine Expeditionary Force to the Philippines in 1898, which in concert with Filipino rebels took control over most of the province of Manila from the Spanish. In 1899, war broke out between the United States and the newly-established First Philippine Republic after the U.S. annexed the Philippines. The war began on February 4 when a 1st Nebraska Infantry Regiment patrol fired on Filipino troops they encountered near the city of Manila, sparking the war's first battle. Throughout the day, American and Filipino troops exchanged fire, and the Americans rejected a ceasefire offer from Filipino commanders. On February 5, American troops went on the offensive, storming and capturing several Filipino entrenchments.

Following their defeat, Philippine Republican Army troops who had been pushed out of their positions by the Americans regrouped at the city of Caloocan, which was located twelve miles north of the city of Manila. Caloocan held strategic value, serving as an important railroad center and blocking any American attempt to capture the city of Malolos. Major General Arthur MacArthur Jr. immediately made plans to launch an attack on Caloocan, but was persuaded by his superior, Major General Elwell Stephen Otis, to delay the planned attack for several days to allow for American reinforcements to arrive and nearby Filipino troops to concentrate in Caloocan. Both men agreed that occupying Caloocan would lead to the capture of a key city and trap several Philippine Republican Army units around Manila Bay.

== Battle ==
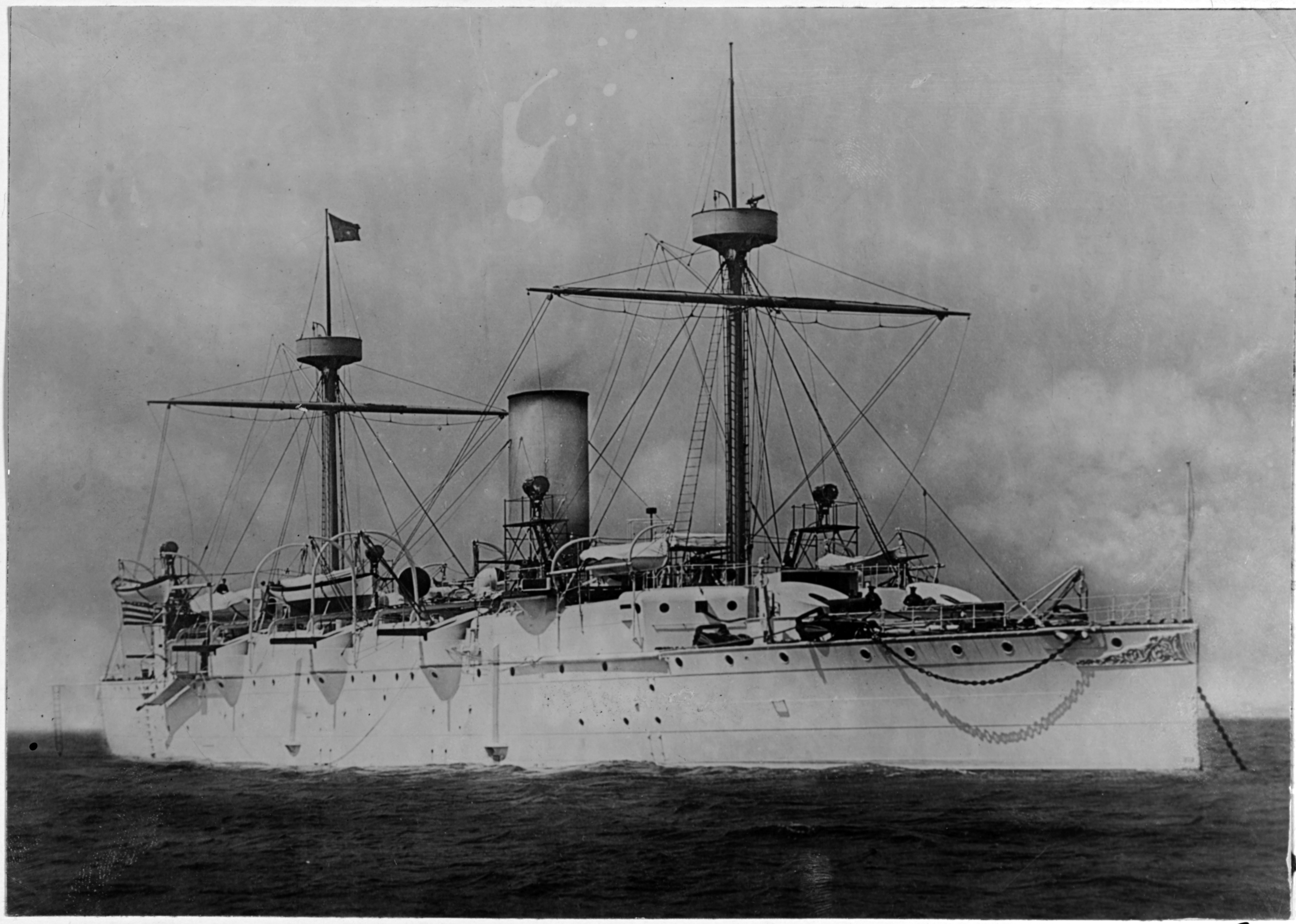
USS Charleston, which bombarded Filipino positions during the battle

On February 10, a detachment of the 6th Field Artillery Regiment along with the U.S. Navy protected cruiser USS Charleston and monitor USS Monadnock began a preparatory bombardment of Filipino redoubts in Caloocan, which lasted for roughly three hours. The commander of the roughly 5,000 Filipino troops in Caloocan was Brigadier-general Antonio Luna, who had made plans to fight a series of delaying actions against advancing American forces before retreating to and fortifying the Cordillera Central mountain range in Luzon. Around 4:00 p.m., 3,312 United States Army troops from the 1st Brigade of the Eighth Army Corps under the command of Brigadier-General Harrison Gray Otis launched a frontal assault on Filipino redoubts around Caloocan.

As part of the frontal assault, the 20th Kansas Volunteer Infantry Regiment advanced along the Manila Bay coastline through a wooded area near Caloocan as the 3rd Field Artillery Regiment and 1st Montana Volunteer Infantry Regiment concurrently executed a flanking maneuver on the city's right side. As American troops advanced towards the Filipino positions, they soon realized that the defenders of Caloocan were firing too high, resulting in the attackers suffering only minor casualties. Encouraged by this, the Americans abandoned their previous tactic of slowly advancing under the safety of suppressive fire and started rushing towards the Filipino positions, only stopping on occasion to fire several fusillades at the Filipino positions before advancing again.

The 20th Kansas, 3rd Field Artillery, and 1st Montana closed in on Caloocan at the same time. Led by Major J. Franklin Bell, a company of the 1st Montana quietly entered Caloocan on the city's eastern side and attacked the Filipino positions from their rear. Perceiving themselves to be trapped, the Filipino troops in Caloocan panicked and began to rout. Advancing American troops rapidly captured the Filipino trenches and charged into the settlement, which had been set aflame by the American artillery bombardment. A group of Filipino soldiers made a last stand at the Caloocan Cathedral, leading to an intense but short close-quarters engagement that resulted in the capture of the cathedral by American attackers. One American officer, caught up in the excitement, shouted "On to Malolos!"; this led the American rank-and-file to start chasing the retreating Filipinos on their own initiative, before being pulled back by infuriated U.S. staff officers.

== Aftermath ==
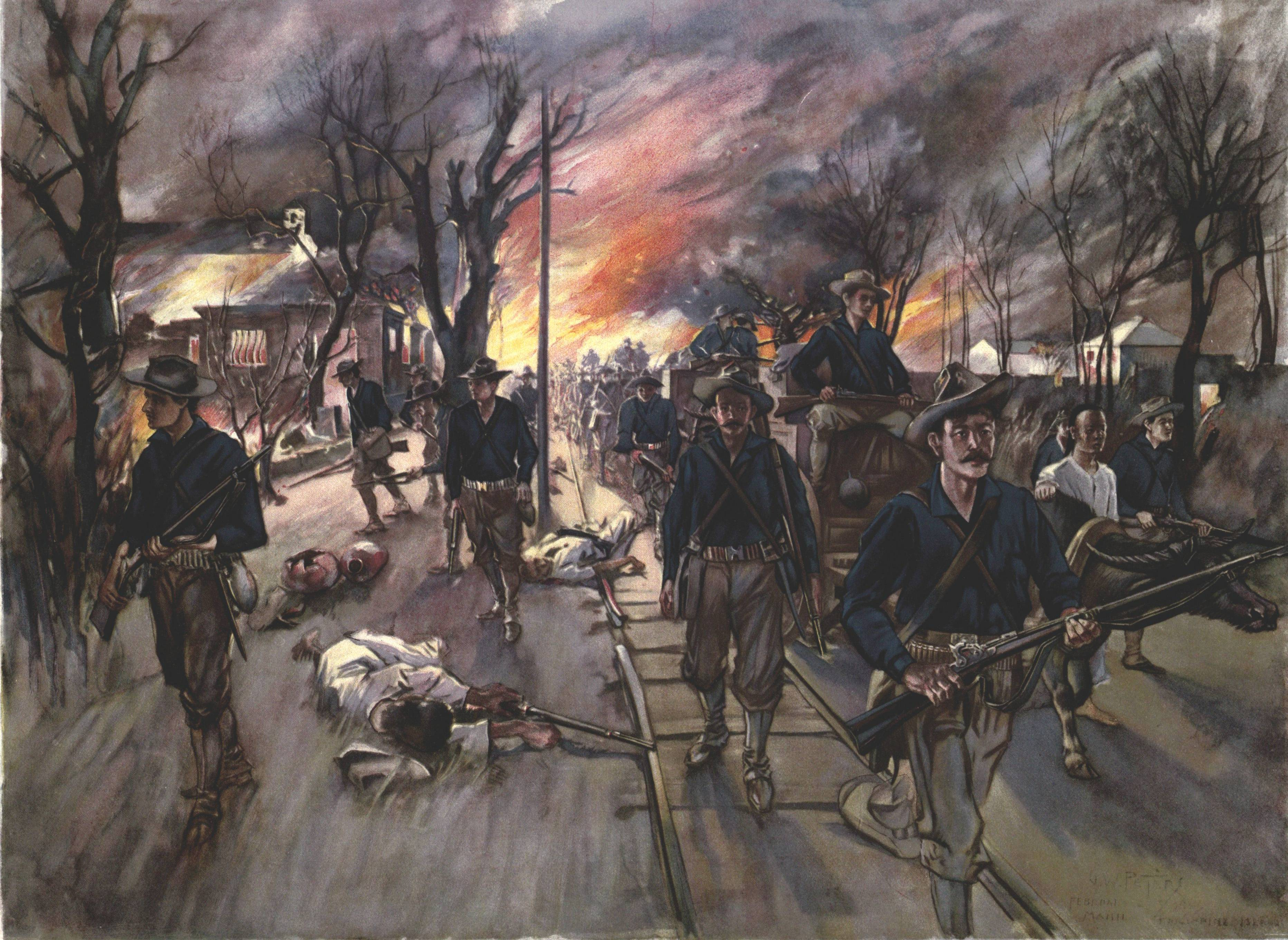
The 20th Kansas marching through Caloocan on February 10

American casualties totaled 6 men killed and 61 wounded. The capture of Caloocan led to the southern terminus of the Manila-Dagupan Railroad along with five locomotives, 50 passenger cars and 100 freight cars falling into American hands. It also compounded the Philippine Republican Army's woes after their defeat just five days earlier, which in the view of senior Filipino officers was exacerbated by the fact that their troops had "once again failed to hold field fortifications against troops attacking over open ground." However, the majority of the Filipino troops in Caloocan had managed to withdraw from the city intact and regroup elsewhere, and as such the battle soon proved not to be the decisive blow MacArthur and other U.S. commanders had hoped for.

Following the battle, American commanders in the region agreed to halt the ongoing U.S. offensive in order to reform their lines, a decision which was soon noticed by Luna and other Filipino commanders, who made plans for a counterattack against the American positions. On February 22, a force of Filipino troops led by Luna and Mariano Llanera launched an attack on American positions in Manila as part of the Second Battle of Caloocan, aiming to recapture the city. Though the Filipinos were initially able to make strong headway against the Americans, indecisiveness and poor communication led to a successful counterattack by U.S. forces, which pushed the Filipinos away from Manila and ensured it would remain under U.S. control for the remainder of the war.

The conduct of American forces during and after the fall of Caloocan came under scrutiny following allegations by U.S. soldiers that several senior officers, including Colonel Wilder Metcalf, had ordered the summary execution of Filipino prisoners of war. Several American soldiers testified to the United States Senate Committee on the Philippines that they overheard a Captain Bishop, a subordinate of Metcalf, discussing no quarter orders issued by his superiors. One American soldier, Corporal Cyrus Ricketts, testified to the committee's members that "several Filipinos in a trench near the dummy line" were summarily executed by U.S. forces after the battle. In response, Colonel Frederick Funston, Metcalf and Bishop all denied issuing any orders to summarily execute prisoners of war, with Metcalf denying an eyewitness account that he had personally executed prisoners. The committee chose not to pursue the matter any further.
