= Church of St. Panteleimon =

Church of St. Panteleimon can refer to:

- Church of St. Panteleimon of Acharnai, Athens, Greece
- Church of St. Panteleimon, Thessaloniki, Greece
- Church of St. Panteleimon, Gorno Nerezi, North Macedonia
- Church of Sts. Clement and Panteleimon, Ohrid, North Macedonia
- Church of St. Panteleimon, Veles in Veles, North Macedonia

== See also ==
- Panteley (disambiguation) for people or places named Panteley or Panteleimon
