= Saint Pantaleon (disambiguation) =

Saint Pantaleon was a legendary Christian martyr.

Saint Pantaleon may also refer to the following:

== Places ==
- Saint-Pantaléon, Lot, France
- Saint-Pantaléon, Vaucluse, France
- Saint-Pantaléon-de-Lapleau, France
- Saint-Pantaléon-de-Larche, France
- Saint-Pantaléon-les-Vignes, France
- Sankt Pantaleon, Austria
- Sankt Pantaleon-Erla, Austria

== Churches ==
- Saint Pantaleon, Cologne, Germany
- San Pantalon, Venice, Italy
- San Pantaleo, Rome

== See also ==
- Panteleimon (disambiguation)
- Pantaleon (disambiguation)
- Pantaleo, a name
