= Pantaleon (disambiguation) =

Pantaleon was an early 2nd century BC Greco-Bactrian king.

Pantaleon may also refer to:

== People ==
=== Given name ===
- Saint Pantaleon (died 303), legendary Christian martyr
- Pantaleon Alvarez (born 1958), Filipino lawyer and politician
- Pantaleon Candidus (1540–1608), Austrian theologian
- Pantaléon Costa de Beauregard (1806–1864), French statesman
- Pantaleón Dalence (1815–1892), Bolivian jurist and politician
- Pantaleon Hebenstreit (1668–1750), German dance teacher, musician and composer
- Pantaleón Salvó (fl. 1910s), Spanish footballer
- Pantaleon Szyndler (1846–1905), Polish painter
- Pantaleón Julian Valdés (fl 1917), Cuban medical doctor
- Pantaleón Valmonte or Belmonte (1856–1896), mayor of Gapan during the Philippine Revolution against Spain
- León Kilat (Pantaleón Villegas, 1873–1898), Filipino revolutionary leader
- Pope Urban IV (Jacques Pantaléon, 1195–1264)

=== Surname ===
- Anchero Pantaléone (1210–1286), French cardinal
- Javier Pantaleón (1941–1978), Argentine singer
- Julissa Reynoso Pantaleón (born 1975), American attorney and diplomat
- Sotirios Pantaleon (born 1980), Greek volleyball player

== Other uses ==
- Pantalon, or pantaleon, a musical instrument
- Pantaleón River, in Guatemala

== See also ==
- Panteleimon (disambiguation), including Panteley
- Pantaleo (disambiguation)
- Saint Pantaleon (disambiguation)
- Captain Pantoja and the Special Service (Pantaleon y las visitadoras), 1973 novel and film adaptation
