= Panteleyev =

Panteleyev, also transliterated as Panteleev (Russian: Пантелеев) is a Russian surname, formed from the Greek name Panteleimon. The feminine form is Panteleyeva or Panteleeva:

- Aleksander Panteleyev (1874–1948), Soviet actor and director, Cohabitation (film)
- Denis Panteleyev (born 1982), Russian footballer
- Elena Deza, née Panteleeva (born 1961), French–Russian mathematician
- Grigorijs Panteļejevs (born 1972), Latvian ice hockey player
- Leonid Panteleyev (1908–1987), writer of The Republic of ShKID (film)
- Marina Panteleyeva (born 1989), Russian sprinter
- Natalya Panteleyeva (born 1983), Russian middle distance runner
- Petko Pantaleev (born 1938), Bulgarian volleyball player
- Serafima Panteleeva (1846–1918), Russian feminist, physiologist, author, and translator.
- Sergey Panteleev (born 1951), Russian politician
- Vladislav Panteleyev (born 1996), Russian footballer
- Yuri Aleksandrovich Panteleyev (1901–1983), Soviet naval officer
- Yuri Panteleyev (born 1999), Russian footballer

== See also ==
- Russian destroyer Admiral Panteleyev
