= Cry of Nueva Ecija =

1896 call for revolution in the Philippines

- Part of the Philippine Revolution
Date	September 2–5, 1896
Location	Nueva Ecija, Philippines
Result	Tactical Filipino victory Strategic Spanish victory: Start of the Philippine Revolution in Central Luzon

Belligerents
Katipunan	Spanish Empire

Commanders and leaders
Mariano Llanera; Pantaleon Valmonte (executed); Manuel Tinio	Joaquin Machorro †; Lopez Arteaga

Strength
3,000 volunteers (500 engaged)	200 men 6 Civil Guards; 3 officers (initial)

Casualties and losses
60 dead	Unknown (heavy)

The first Cry of Nueva Ecija (Filipino: Sigaw ng Nueva Ecija; Spanish: Grito de Nueva Écija) occurred on September 2–5, 1896, in the province of Nueva Ecija, in the Philippines under Spanish rule. It followed shortly after the Cry of Pugad Lawin and was the first call for revolution in central Luzon. Roughly 3,000 volunteers were led by Mariano Llanera and Pantaleon Valmonte (the Gobernadorcillos of Cabiao and Gapan, respectively). They marched towards San Isidro, the provincial capital, where after fighting several battles with the Spanish forces, their army was finally forced to retreat and to undertake guerrilla warfare.

== Tyranny of Spain ==
In response to Spanish oppression, the formation of the Katipunan, the Cry of Pugad Lawin, of August 1896, and the repression that followed, Mariano Llanera led about 700 men (Note: 461 of the 700 men from Cabiao are listed on the Tablet of Heroes in the Municipal Compound) from Cabiao, while Pantaleon Valmonte led troops from Gapan. Manuel Tinio, Colonel Alipio Tecson, and their men also joined the combined forces of Llanera and Valmonte. With the people of the neighboring towns of Arayat, Deliquente (San Antonio), and Jaen, this force numbered three thousand Filipino revolutionaries, and it prepared to seize the provincial capital of San Isidro. Although the force numbered 3,000, it was only possessed of about 100 rifles. So, the Filipinos organized themselves at Sitio Pulu, about 5 kilometers from San Isidro, and chose 500 men for the initial attack, and chose to employ the Cabiao Brass Band (Note: Sources also refer to it as a bamboo band, or orchestra, named the "Banda Makabayan De Cabiao".) to disguise the military movement as a peaceful march meant to gain the release of those already arrested by the Spanish.

Upon reaching San Isidro, the revolutionaries furiously fought the Spaniards, who defended themselves in the Casa Tribunal and the Arsenal, as well as in other government buildings, and in the houses of Spanish residents. The Spanish commander, Joaquin Machorro, commander of the Guardia Civil, was killed on the first day of battle. At the end of three days of fighting, the Spanish were driven out, and the revolutionaries seemed to have prevailed.

== Spanish counterattack ==
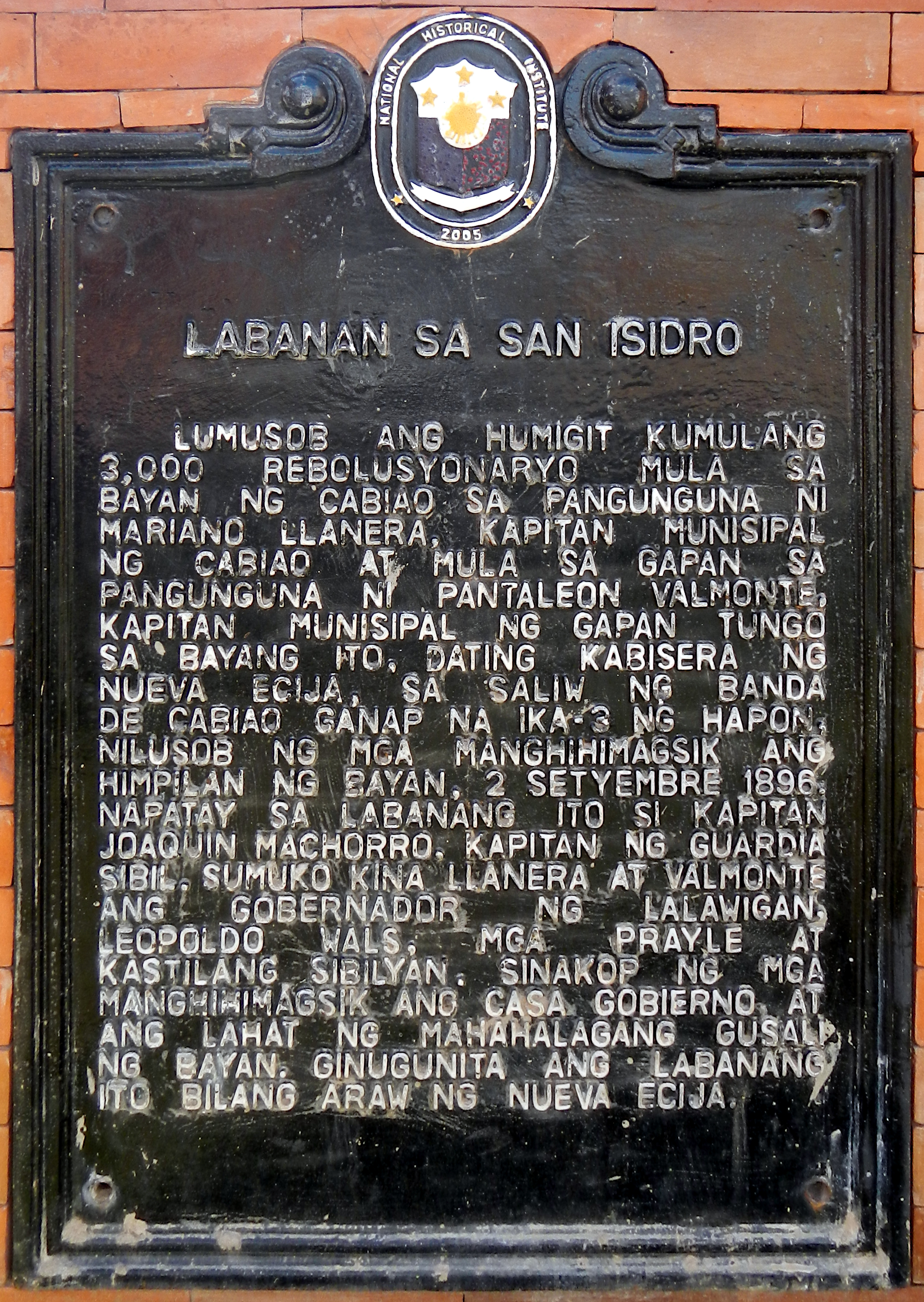
Historical marker installed at the San Isidro Town Plaza in 2005 to commemorate the battle

The Spanish delayed reacting due to the sheer scale of the uprising in the province and its surroundings. However, by the next day, Major Lopez Arteaga had hastily organized a company of 200 men. Fighting throughout the next night followed.

This time, the Spanish army prevailed, as they regained possession of the town. They successfully drove the insurgents out of the government centers. More Spanish troops arrived from Peñaranda, forcing the poorly armed rebels to retreat, leaving behind 60 of their dead.

The Spaniards continued to pursue the rebels, furiously driving the rebels out of Cabiao. The rebels of Cabiao retreated to Candaba, Pampanga, while the rebels of Gapan retreated to San Miguel de Mayumo, Bulacan. The San Isidro rebels crossed the river to safety in Jaen, Nueva Ecija. Manuel Tinio defended the rebels crossing the river, who were all relatives of the local rebels, and were among his kinfolk.

== Guerrilla warfare ==
After the retreat, Llanera, Tinio, and other Nueva Ecijano commanders, shifted to guerrilla warfare until they could regroup for another offensive. This tactic, though effective in stalling for time, caused the revolutionaries massive casualties, as the Spaniards furiously pursued them. Generals like Manuel Tinio had to constantly escape from pursuit and hide, as the revolutionaries continued to fight desperate skirmishes against a well-armed and well-prepared enemy. This continued until late December when, for a while, there was no pursuit by the Spaniards and the revolution seemed over. Llanera used this vital pause to regroup for another attempt at revolt.
