= Panteleimon =

Panteleimon or Panteley may refer to:

== People ==
- Pantaleon, also called Panteleimon, king in Bactria and India (reigned c. 190–180 BC)
- Saint Pantaleon, also called Saint Panteleimon
- Panteley Dimitrov, Bulgarian football midfielder
- Panteley Kiselov, Bulgarian soldier and general
- Panteleimon Golosov, Russian Constructivist architect and brother of Ilya Golosov
- Panteleimon Kotokos, Greek Orthodox bishop
- Panteleimon Kulish, Ukrainian writer
- Panteleimon Ponomarenko, general in the Red Army
- Panteleimon Romanov, Russian/Soviet writer
- Panteleimon Sudzhaksky, Bulgarian Orthodox monk
- Cary-Hiroyuki Tagawa (Panteleimon Tagawa), Japanese-American-Russian actor

== Places ==
- Paralia Panteleimonos (Beach of Panteleimon), a settlement of the former municipal district of Panteleimonas
- Panteleimon, Kilkis, a village in the Kilkis regional unit, Greece
- Panteleimon Kulish Gymnasium, a high school in Borzna, Ukraine

== Religious buildings ==
- Church of St. Panteleimon of Acharnai, central Athens, Greece
- Church of St. Panteleimon (Nerezi), North Macedonia
- Church of St. Panteleimon, Thessaloniki, Greece
- St. Panteleimon's Cathedral, in the Kyivan neighbourhood of Theophania
- St. Panteleimon Monastery, on Mount Athos in Greece
- St. Panteleimon Monastery, Myrtou, Cyprus
- Church of St. Panteleimon, Mirkovci, Croatia

== Other uses ==
- Panteleimon, the renamed Imperial Russian battleship Potemkin of the period 1905 to 1917, named for Saint Pantaleon (Panteleimon)
- Pantalaimon ("Pan"), the daemon of the fictional character Lyra Belacqua in Philip Pullman's His Dark Materials trilogy of 1995–2000

== See also ==
- Pantelej (disambiguation)
- Pantaleon (disambiguation)
- Pantaleyev (disambiguation)
