= Mariano Llanera =

Filipino revolutionary general (1855–1942)

Mariano Núñez Llanera
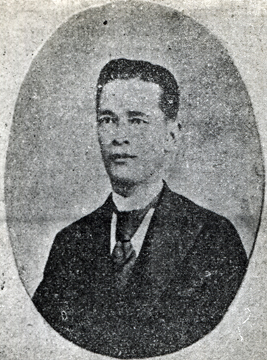
- Llanera in 1899
- Born: Mariano Llanera y Núñez; November 9, 1855; Cabiao, Nueva Ecija, Captaincy General of the Philippines
- Died: September 19, 1942 (aged 86); Cabiao, Nueva Ecija, Philippine Commonwealth
- Military career
- Allegiance: First Philippine Republic; Republic of Biak-na-Bato; Katipunan
- Branch: Philippine Revolutionary Army
- Rank: General
- Conflicts: Philippine Revolution: Cry of Nueva Ecija; Philippine–American War: Second Battle of Caloocan

Mariano Núñez Llanera (born Mariano Llanera y Núñez; November 9, 1855 – September 19, 1942) was a Filipino revolutionary general from Cabiao, Nueva Ecija who fought in his aforementioned home province, and also in the neighboring provinces of Bulacan, Tarlac, and Pampanga. He is considered one of the "three Fathers" (the main instigators/commanders) of the Cry of Nueva Ecija, along with Pantaleon Valmonte and Manuel Tinio.

== Early life ==
Llanera studied at the Colegio de San Juan de Letran. He then became a Cabeza de barangay and later, a Gobernadorcillo for two terms in the town of Cabiao. He married his first wife, Salome Siapoco, in 1877.

== Philippine Revolution ==
As soon as the news about the Revolution reached Nueva Ecija and Bulacan, men were mobilized on September 1, 1896. Among the leaders were Mariano and his son Eduardo Llanera, Mamerto Natividad, Alipio Tecson and Manuel Tinio. Llanera used his own flag: a black flag, with the single white letter K and the skull and crossbones symbol. It was said that Andrés Bonifacio himself ridiculed the flag and called it Llanera's Skull.

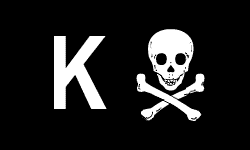
Llanera's Battle Flag

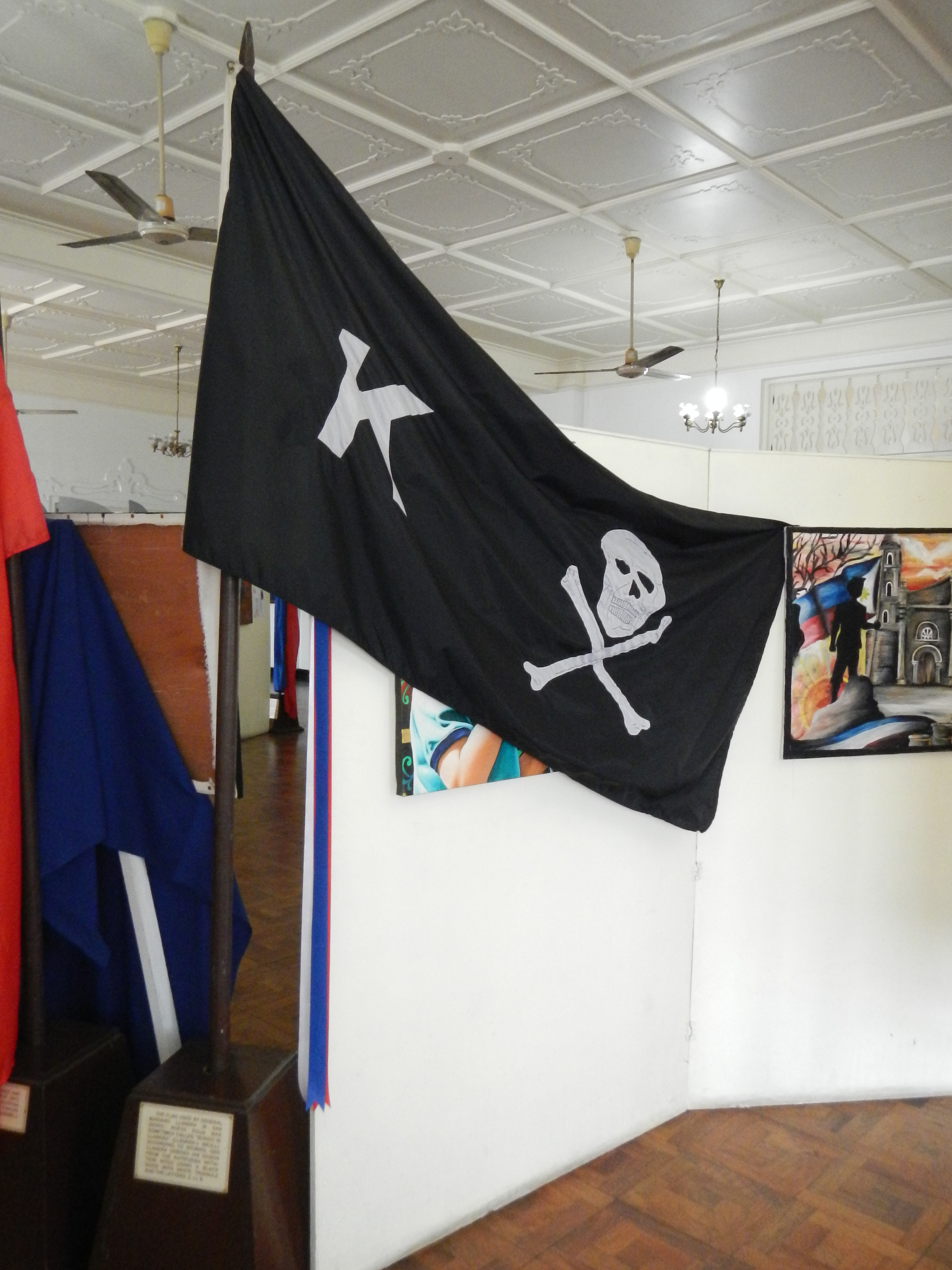
"Bungo ni Llanera": The flag used by Mariano Llanera in San Isidro, Nueva Ecija (in Casa Real Museum, Malolos City).

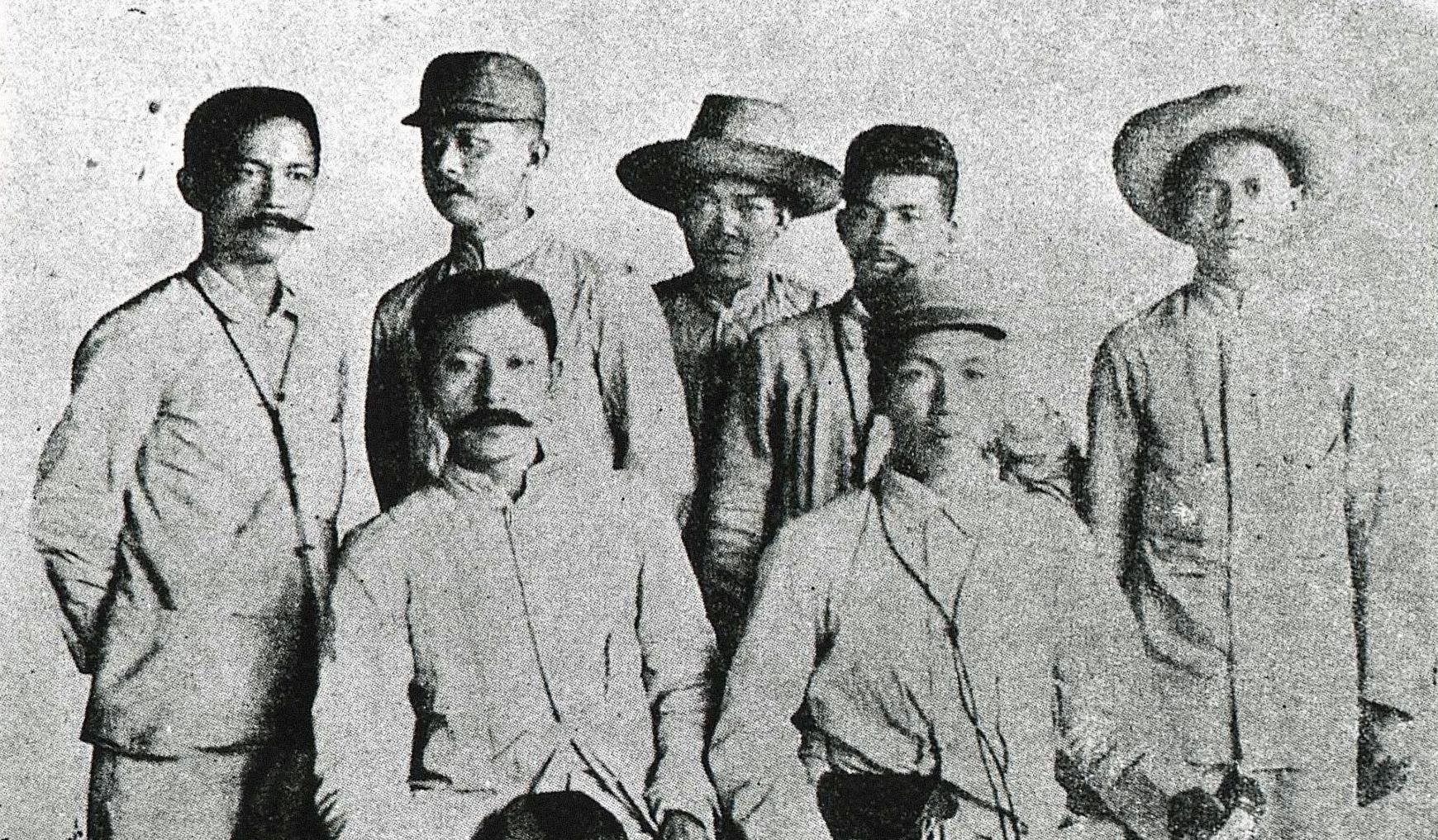
Llanera was far right at the back of Pedro A. Paterno (front left) and Emilio Aguinaldo (front right)

Llanera gathered with him around 3,000 men, including Tinio and his men, mostly armed with bolos, and bamboo spears. Only few had guns. Of the 3,000 who volunteered, 500 determined men were chosen for the attack. Led by a brass band of Cabiao named Banda Makabayan De Cabiao, the force came in two separate columns from Cabiao and Gapan and converged in Sitio Pulu, which was 5 kilometers from San Isidro. Despite having only 100 rifles, the rebels furiously held siege the Spaniards in the Casa Tribunal, the arsenal, and other government buildings. Capt. Joaquin Machorro, commander of the Guardias Civiles, was killed on the first day of battle. The Spanish authorities hastily organized a company of 200 armed civilian Spaniards and mercenaries the following day and attacked the overconfident insurgents, driving the latter away from the government center. The next day, more Spanish reinforcements arrived. It forced the poorly armed rebels to retreat, leaving behind 60 dead. The Spaniards went in hot pursuit of the insurgents, forcing those from Cabiao to flee to Pampanga, and those from Gapan to hide in San Miguel de Mayumo in Bulacan - San Miguel, Bulacan. The insurgents from San Isidro fled across the river to hide in Jaen, Nueva Ecija. The relatives of those who were recognized were driven away from their homes by the colonial authorities. The Spaniards’ relentless pursuit of the rebels forced them to disband and go into hiding until January 1897. After Bonifacio's death in May 1897, he was designated lieutenant general. He was with Emilio Aguinaldo when the latter, along with 35 more revolutionaries, was exiled to Hong Kong on December 23, 1897, in accordance to the Pact of Biak-na-Bato.

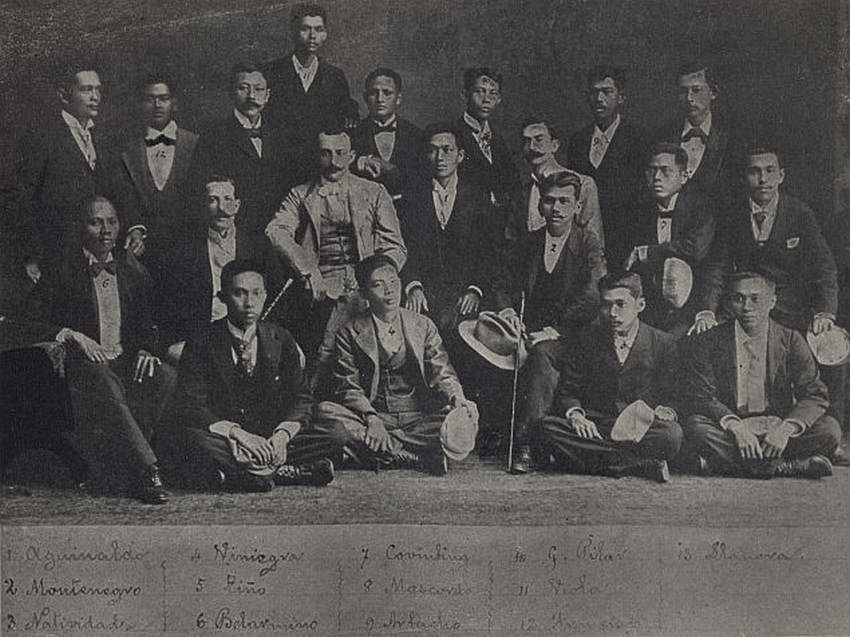
Llanera was the first person from the left at the third row

== Philippine–American War ==
When the Philippine–American War broke out, he was in the Philippines and was assigned by Gen. Antonio Luna as lieutenant general in Manila. On February 23, 1899, Llanera and his troops were with Luna's forces when the latter staged a counterattack in Caloocan to prevent the Americans from invading further north. The counterattack, however, was only partly successful because the Kawit battalion refused to move.

Llanera was later caught by the Americans during the same year. He was deported to Guam on January 16, 1901, with Artemio Ricarte and 30 more military officers of the Revolution considered Irreconcilables by the Americans. He returned to the Philippines in February 1903 in response to the demand of the people of the United States.

== Death and legacy ==
In 1919, he married his second wife, Feliza Balajadia. He died in his hometown (Cabiao) on September 19, 1942. The General Llanera Memorial Lodge No. 168, established in 1963 in Gapan, was named in honor of him. The General Mariano Llanera Day, a commemoration of Llanera's attack against the Spaniards on September 2, 1896, was celebrated in Nueva Ecija - Cry of Nueva Ecija.
