= Pantelej (disambiguation) =

Pantelej is an urban municipality of the city of Niš, Serbia.

- Pantelej neighbourhood, Niš, a neighbourhood within the municipality
- Pantelej, Kočani, a rural settlement in Kočani, Macedonia

== See also ==
- Panteley (disambiguation)
