= Serafima Panteleeva =

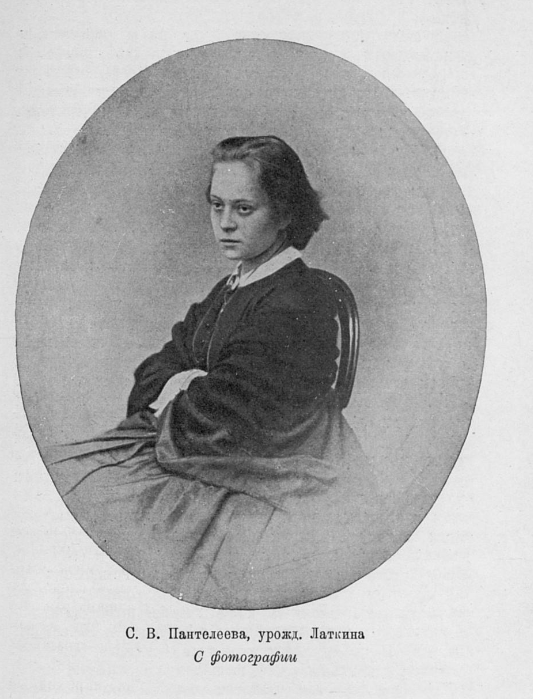
- Born: 1846; St Petersburg, Russian Empire
- Died: 1918 (about 71–72); Petrograd, Soviet Russia (now St Petersburg, Russia)
- Education: University of Zurich
- Spouse: Longin Panteleev
- Scientific career
- Fields: Physiology

Serafima Panteleeva, née Latkina (1846–1918), was a Russian feminist, physiologist, author, and translator.

== Life ==
Serafima Panteleeva was born in 1846 in St Petersburg, capital of the Russian Empire. She married the student activist and publisher Longin Pantelev in 1864. After her husband's arrest in December 1864 for revolutionary activities during the government's crackdown on dissent after the Polish Uprising of 1863–64. She followed Panteleev into Siberian exile after his conviction in May 1866. Depressed after the death in infancy of her second child and her father in 1867, Panteleeva returned home. Needing to support herself and her daughter, she enrolled in the co-educational Vladimir lecture courses in 1870 and then became a medical student at the University of Zurich two years later, specializing in physiology. Some of her work there was later published in the Journal of Medical Science (German: Zentralblatt für Medizinische Wissenschaften). She joined her husband after his return from exile in 1875 and was able to finish her research in the laboratories of the Medical-Surgical Academy and then the Russian Academy of Sciences the following year. Unable to work in her field, Panteleeva began translating scientific papers and wrote essays on popular science. After signing two petitions protesting the brutal treatment of peaceful protestors in 1901, her husband was exiled from St Petersburg for three years. They spent most of that time in Western Europe before returning in 1904. Panteleeva died in Petrograd (as St Petersburg was briefly renamed) in 1918.

== Activities ==
Panteleeva became more interested in women's education in the 1900s and was a delegate to the First All-Russian Congress of Women (Pervyi Vserossiiskii Zhenskii S’ezd) in December 1908. Five years later, she presented a paper to the First All-Russian Congress on Women's Education (Pervyi Vserossiiskii S’ezd po Obrazovaniiu Zhenshchin) on her experiences in Zurich.
