= Pantaleón Valmonte =

Filipino revolutionary (1856–1896)

Capitan Municipal of Gapan
- In office January 11, 1895 – September 4, 1896

Personal details
- Born: Pantaleon Valmonte y Rufino; July 26, 1856 Gapan, Nueva Ecija, Captaincy General of the Philippines
- Died: September 4, 1896 (aged 40) San Isidro, Nueva Ecija, Captaincy General of the Philippines
- Cause of death: Execution by firing squad
- Spouse: Maxima Navarro
- Education: Ateneo Municipal de Manila
- Profession: Politician, military leader

Military service
- Allegiance: Katipunan (Magdalo)
- Years of service: c. 1890–1896
- Rank: Brigadier General
- Battles/wars: Philippine Revolution

Pantaleón Valmonte y Rufino, sometimes referred to as Pantaleón Belmonte (July 26, 1856 – September 4, 1896), was capitan municipal (mayor) of Gapan and a general during the Philippine Revolution against Spain. He is popularly known as one of the officers who led the "Cry of Nueva Ecija" on September 2, 1896, and together with General Mariano Llanera commanded 3,000 guerilla troops who captured and momentarily held the provincial capitol of Nueva Ecija in the town of Factoria (now San Isidro). He is one of the three Fathers of The Cry of Nueva Ecija, along with Mariano Llanera and Manuel Tinio.

== Early life and education ==
Valmonte was born into an old and illustrious family at the so-called "Bahay-na-Sim," on what is now Valmonte Street in Gapan, Nueva Ecija, on July 26, 1856, the son of Basilio Valmonte and Rosa Rufino. Basilio's father, Don Bartolomé dela Cruz Valmonte, was Gapan's first capitan municipal, appointed in 1747, just 15 years after Gapan was proclaimed a local administrative unit in 1732. One of Basilio's sisters, Juana, was the original owner of the only Spanish reproduction of the image of La Divina Pastora in the Philippines, which arrived in the country through the Galleon Trade. The image is the object of an annual pilgrimage to the National Shrine of La Virgen Divina Pastora in Gapan, and is one of the patrons of the parish (the others being the Three Kings) since the 1800s, though it remained privately held in the home of the Valmontes until 1986.

According to a descendant, journalist Ramon Valmonte, the family later adopted the surname "Valmonte" for its poetic meaning, being a conjunction of the Spanish words "valle" ("valley") and "montaña" ("mountain").

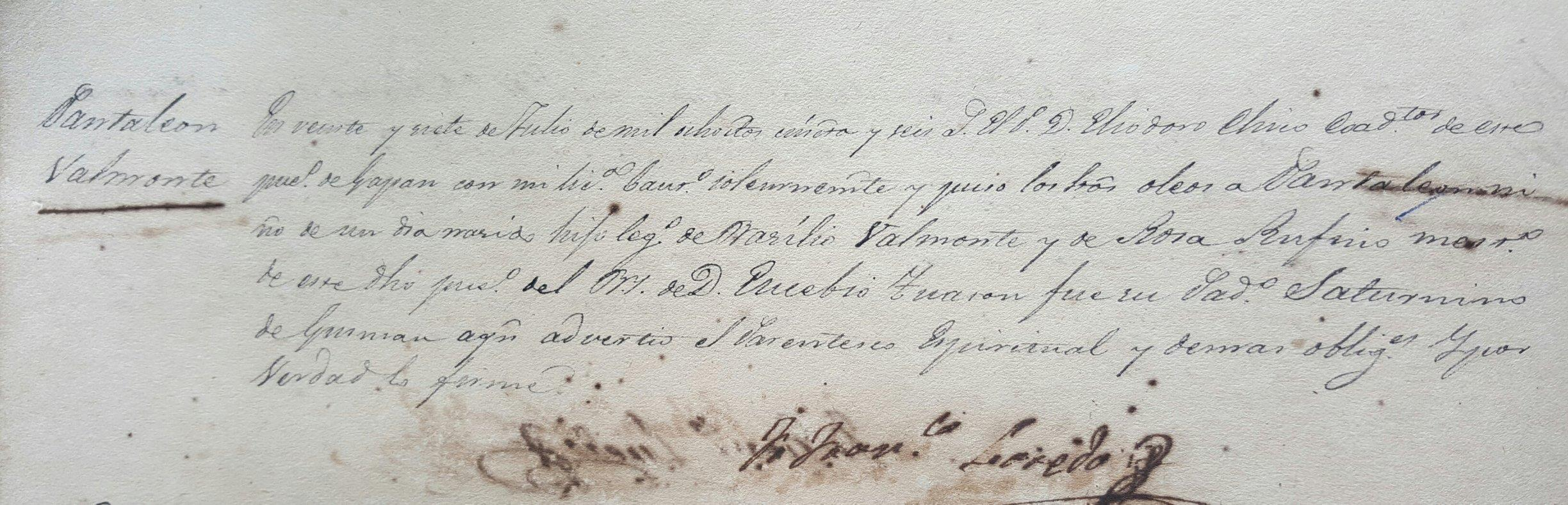
Valmonte's baptismal certificate

Valmonte enrolled at the Universidad de Santo Tomás (UST) in 1871, before transferring to Ateneo Municipal de Manila. He was a contemporary of Philippine national hero Jose Rizal during his time at the Ateneo and might have belonged to the same class. This was because according to Pantaleon's son Joaquin, Rizal had paid the family a visit in the early years. Rizal would make a reference to Gapan's secondary patron saint, La Divina Pastora, in the chapter "A Cochero's Christmas Eve" of his novel El Filibusterismo

== Capitan Municipal ==
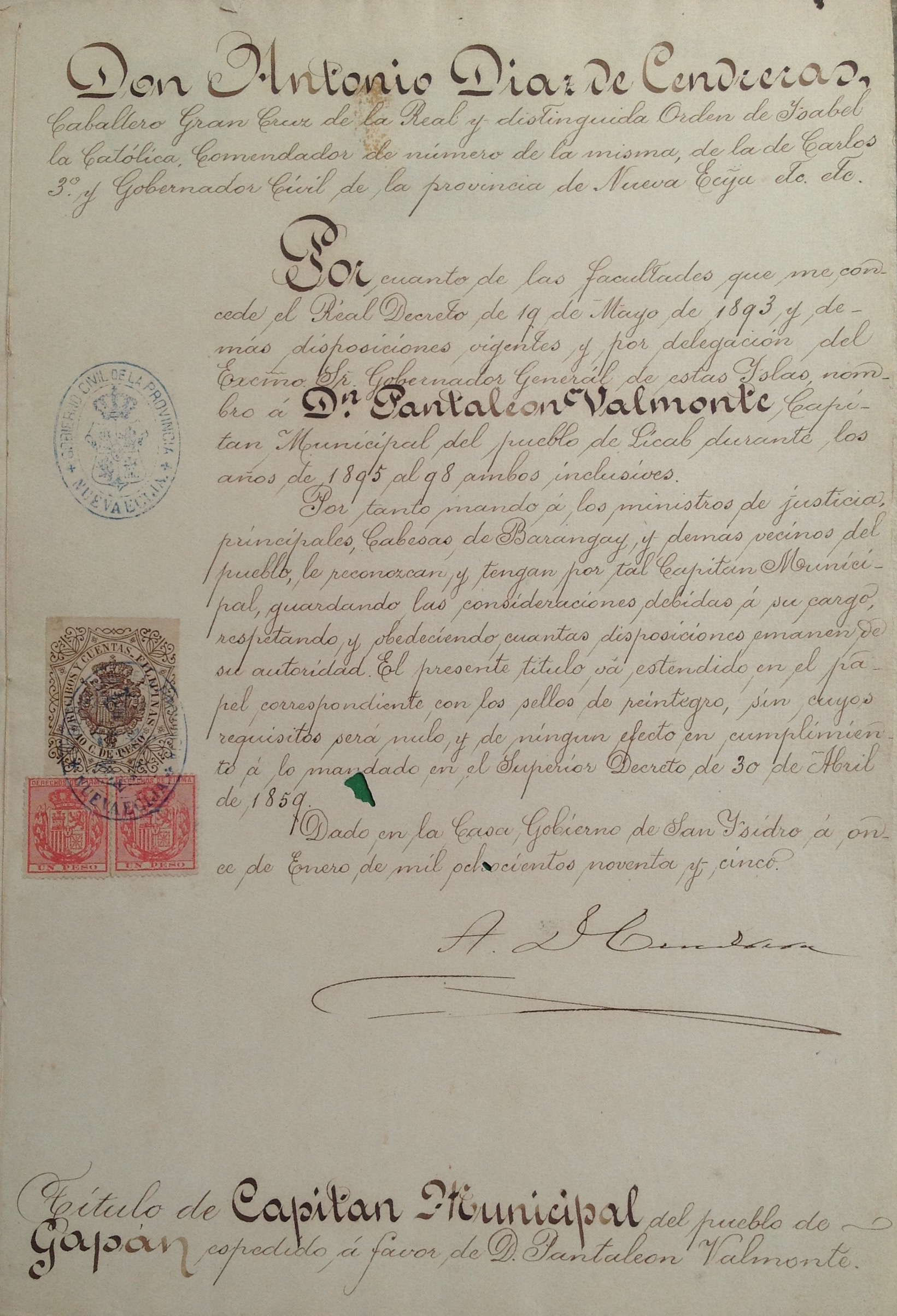
Valmonte's appointment as capitan municipal of Gapan

Valmonte was appointed by Nueva Ecija Governor Antonio Diaz de Cendreras as Capitan Municipal (mayor) of Gapan on January 11, 1895. As a municipal head, Valmonte was able to ingratiate himself with Spanish authorities, to the extent that he named the nearby village of Manikling as San Leonardo after Diaz de Cendreras's successor and frequent house guest Leonardo Bal. Yet he was at odds with the clergy, owing to his refusal to conform to the custom of kissing the hand of the parish priest.

When the provincial government discovered the existence of the Katipunan and began arresting its members, Bal found Valmonte's name on the list. Bal only went as far as to caution the mayor in honor of their friendship, never guaranteeing his safety from arrest. When Valmonte learned of the detention of several local Katipunan members including Mamerto Natividad and Marcus Ventus, he conferred with the capitan municipal of Cabiao Mariano Llanera to do something for their colleagues.

== Role in the revolution ==
According to a version attributed to historian Leopoldo Serrano, the Filipinos, headed by Valmonte and Llanera, organized themselves on September 2, 1896, at Sitio Pulu, about 5 kilometers from Factoria, choosing 500 men for the initial attack, and employing the Cabiao Brass Band to disguise the military movement as a peaceful march meant to gain the release of those already arrested by the Spanish. There, the secretly armed groups from Cabiao and Gapan coalesced and unleashed a ferocious assault upon the Spaniards, who defended themselves in the Casa Tribunal and the Arsenal, as well as in other government buildings and in the houses of Spanish residents. The revolutionaries also freed incarcerated Katipuneros and ransacked government coffers. The Spanish commander of the guardia civil, Joaquin Machorro, was killed on the first day of battle.

At the end of three days of fighting, the Spanish were driven out, and the revolutionaries initially prevailed before colonizers were able to retake the provincial capital and drive the revolutionaries as far out as Candaba, Pampanga in the south, San Miguel de Mayumo, Bulacan in the east and Jaen, Nueva Ecija in the west. The uprising and its attendant "Cry of Nueva Ecija" earned the province its place in the Philippine flag as one of the eight rays of the sun, each ray representing a province that revolted against Spain.

== According to other accounts ==
Journalist, professor and family chronicler Ramon Valmonte (Pantaleon Valmonte's great-grandnephew) wrote a differing account based on the recollections of his grand-uncle Joaquin, who was mayor of Gapan during the Commonwealth period and was Pantaleon's youngest child. His account points to the fact that the short interval between Valmonte's capture, detention and execution puts into question the veracity of the three-day fighting during the "First Cry of Nueva Ecija."

According to Joaquin, the plan of the September 2 delegation to Factoria was purely to negotiate the release of the arrested Katipunan members. A brass band was brought as an introductory present to Machorro who was a known music lover. Like Val, Machorro also frequented the Valmonte residence as guest during Sunday luncheons.

Prof. Valmonte describes the attack as told by his grand-uncle:

At the appointed date and time, the Cabiao band began to play in front of the garrison. Machorro, roused from his siesta by the music, peeped out from his second floor quarters and saw Capitan Valmonte and Capitan Llanera below, and dressed up to meet them.

Unknown to Valmonte and Llanera, a son of the detained Marcos Ventus, Manuel, had sneaked under the stairway of the garrison, armed with a gun and intent on avenging the arrest and imprisonment of his father.

When Machorro descended the stairs, Manuel emerged from his hiding place and fired, fatally hitting the Spanish official.

The result was chaos. The panic stricken guardia civil secured the garrison, wondering what could happen next. The Gapan and Cabiao delegations rushed home shocked, frustrated and scared after the unexpected and tragic turn of events.

The result of the death of Machorro was described by Lolo Joaquin as juez de cuchillo, literally 'justice by the knife.’

— Ramon Valmonte, Nueva Ecija Journal

== Capture and execution ==
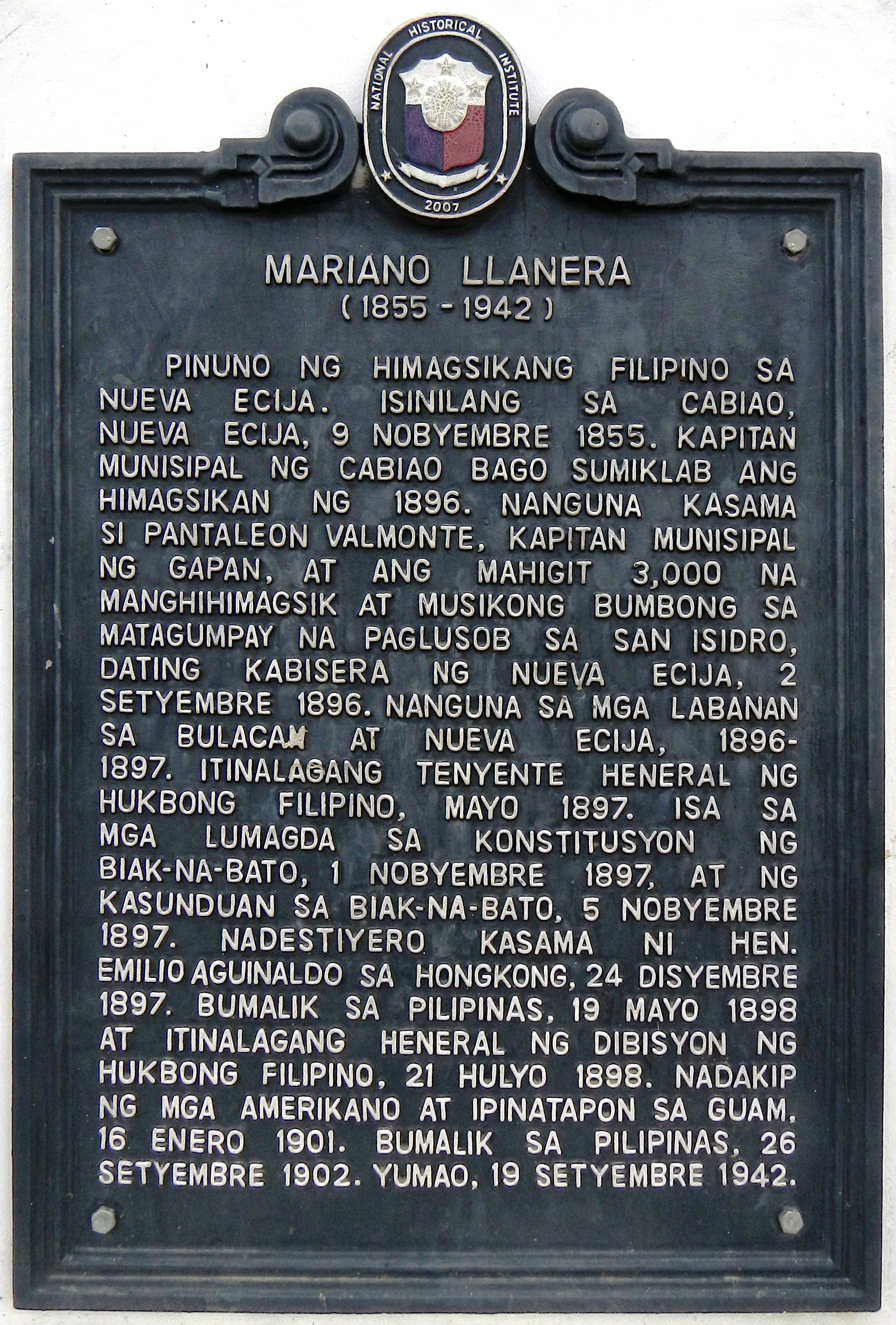
The Mariano Llanera Shrine marker acknowledging Gen. Valmonte's participation in the First Cry of Nueva Ecija.

On September 3, Valmonte, who did not go into hiding thinking he had no reason to do so, was apprehended in Gapan along with his deputy mayor Epifanio Ramos by Spanish soldiers and Filipino volunteers. They were jailed in Factoria, and on September 4 were taken to Barrio Calaba where they were shot to death and their bodies dumped in an unmarked grave that has never been found.

Eleven other Gapan officials were rounded up and condemned to summary executions. The municipal treasurer Emilio Jacinto (not the national hero of the same name), along with the scribe Manuel del Corro and councilors Leocadio Liwag, Severino Tiangco, Valentin Liwag, Ramon Tinawin and Saturnino Magno was taken across the river from the old marketplace and shot to death. Juanario Malgapo, described as "head of the cordilleras" and Honorio Malgapo, cordillera, were arrested in a rice field and hacked to pieces. Faustino delos Reyes, director-secretario, was shot and killed in a rice field beside the town cemetery. Quintin Tinio, justice of the peace, was killed by a volunteer in adjacent Peñaranda town.

Llanera managed to escape the carnage and continued fighting against the colonizers—first the Spanish, and then the Americans.

== Commemoration ==
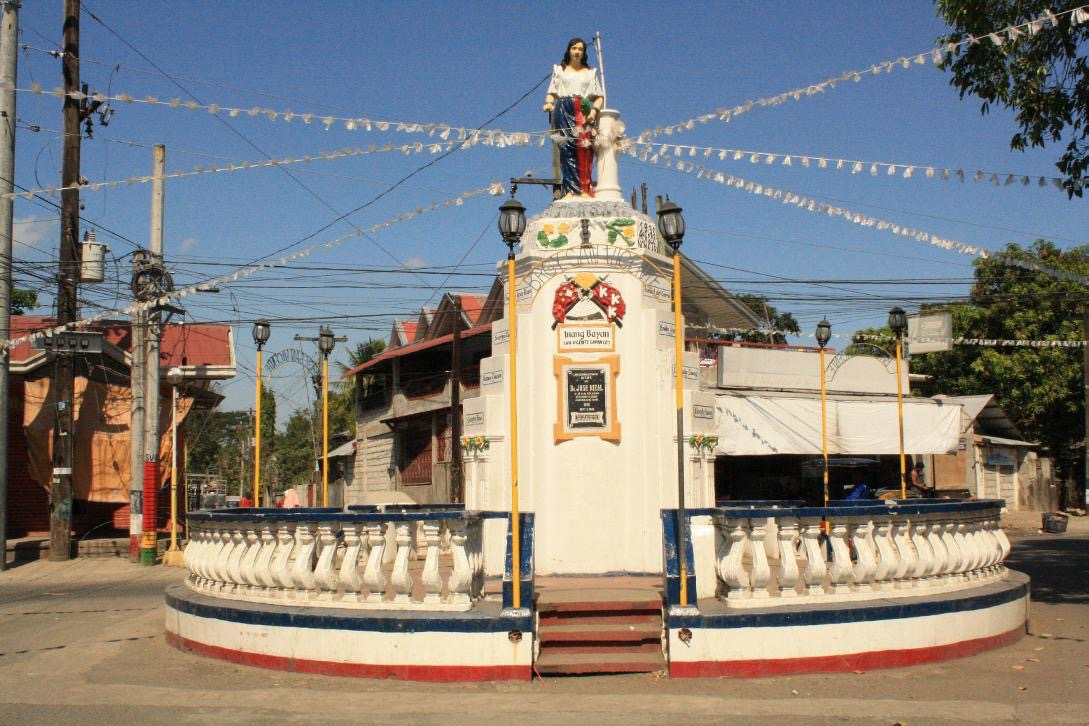
The Inang Bayan Shrine

In honor of Valmonte and fellow patriots now called the "Thirteen Martyrs of Gapan," the townspeople built a memorial called “Inang Bayan” in 1938 at a junction in Barangay San Vicente, Gapan, where their names were inscribed on marble slabs that were eventually vandalized. The main roads of Gapan were named after them, with the former main street beside the river, where Pantaleon Valmonte’s house used to stand, becoming known as Valmonte Street.

Valmonte, along with Tinio, Llanera, etc. who fought and died during the Revolution, was honored by Masonic District RIII-D in a ceremony at the Cabanatuan City Hall commemorating the Philippines' 112th Independence on June 12, 2010. Valmonte was raised and passed at Penaranda’s Masonic Triangle No. 80, which also counted among its lodge brethren fellow revolutionists Mamerto Natividad Sr., Domingo Cecilio, Marcos Ventus, Epifanio Ramos, Cipriano Sarile, and Teodorico Lagonera.
