= Pantaleo =

Pantaleo is an Italian name. Saint Pantaleon or Pantaleo was a 4th century saint, whose veneration was widespread in Italy. Notable people with the name include:

== Surname ==
- Mario Pantaleo (1915–1992), Italian priest who lived most of his life in Argentina
- Rocco Pantaleo (1956–2010), Italian restaurateur
- Daniel Pantaleo, NYPD officer responsible for the killing of Eric Garner

== Given name ==
- Pantaleo Carabellese (1877–1948), Italian philosopher
- Pantaleo Corvino (b. 1949), Italian director of football (soccer)

== See also ==
- Pantaleon (disambiguation)
- Pantalone, a commedia dell'arte character
