= Panteleimon Sudzhaksky =

Bulgarian Orthodox monk and founder of the Panteleymonovtsy religious movement

Panteleimon Sudzhaksky (1793 – 25 February 1868) was a Bulgarian Orthodox (later Greek-Catholic) monk and founder of the Panteleymonovtsy religious movement.

== Biography ==
Pantaleimon was born to a Bulgarian family in 1793 in the Sudzhak village, near Adrianople (modern Edirne). The family was very poor and Panteleimon had since childhood worked in small shops. As child taught himself to read the Gospels. At this time a plague was raging in the country, every day, many corpses dispatched to the cemetery. Intimidation is the thought of the child's death fled the city and wandered through Thrace in search of a place where people had not died. To his inquiries about this place, all answered the same: "Everywhere, people are dying, a place where you could find protection from death, no." But one old woman said to the boy that the monks of Mount Athos as if they were old, never die. Panteleimon immediately went to Mount Athos, where he asked to take a number of monks. Panteleimon was adopted by an old monk named Damascus, in the number of their students. One missed Panteleimon in the monastic life, he longed for frequent communion, however, the monks at the time took communion every forty days. In the Gospel reading Pantalaimon, "a man may eat it and not die" ( John 6:50 ), and "he who eats this bread will live for ever" ( John 6:51 ). Remembering the old fear that forced him to flee from Adrianople, the young man began to ask Damascus, whether these words are true and what kind of bread is it? At the time he lived in complete ignorance of the tenets of the faith, like most of the Bulgarian Orthodox Christians receive communion without knowing anything about the nature of this sacrament. After hearing from Damascus, under the guise of bread and wine hidden Savior, and that this ordinance gives humanity immortality, Panteleimon was trying Communion as often as possible. But monks laurels, noting that jealousy, began to condemn it, and eventually expelled him from the monastery. Pantalaimon took the communion in the one or the other monastery of Mount Athos. But it soon opened and angry monks first bound him in chains, and then completely banished from Mount Athos. Wandering Panteleimon requested communion in charity. Soon he began to join the supporters, which attracted his devotion and piety. Panteleimon gathered around his pupils, daily Communion was their rule, while they were traveling along the Sacraments in the chest following the example of the ancient Christians. Panteleimon followers lived in abject poverty, being content with bread and water, odivalis in rags and had no personal property. They carefully studied the Scriptures and the Creation of the Church Fathers. Soon after hearing about the sanctity of Panteleimon echoed throughout Thrace and Macedonia, the faithful flocked to him from everywhere. This popular movement aroused the envy of the Greek clergy, on the orders of Bishop Panteleimon of Adrianople was signed first in jail and then was held in different jails of the monastery of Mount Athos. Finally, after a long journey of persecution and Pantalaimon could find peace in his native Sudzhake, where he founded a convent, later he founded a monastery in Mostratli. At this time in Bulgaria gathered force the Uniate movement. Abbot of Saint Panteleimon, to which people flocked are initially hostile to this movement, not knowing how much of his countrymen, what is the Catholic Christians, and considering them heretics. But later, while in Adrianople, he was able to talk with the head of the Bulgarian Greek Catholic Church, Raphael Popov, and then he admitted the truth of the Catholic faith, and together with his monks and nuns, including 400 of them, they united to Catholic Church. Panteleimon joined the Catholic Church in December 1863. He had then seventy years old. After that, he lived for another 4 years, chased all the time by the Greeks for preaching the unity of the Catholic Church. Fourteenth day of October 1865, Pope Pius IX sent him a welcome and encouraging literacy. Pantaleon died as Catholic in Adrianople on 25 February 1868, and his body was buried in the same place, a huge crowd, and later his remains were moved to Sudzhaksky monastery when he is resting today.
