= Church of St. Panteleimon of Acharnai =

Greek Orthodox basilica in Athens, Greece

Saint Panteleimon of Acharnai
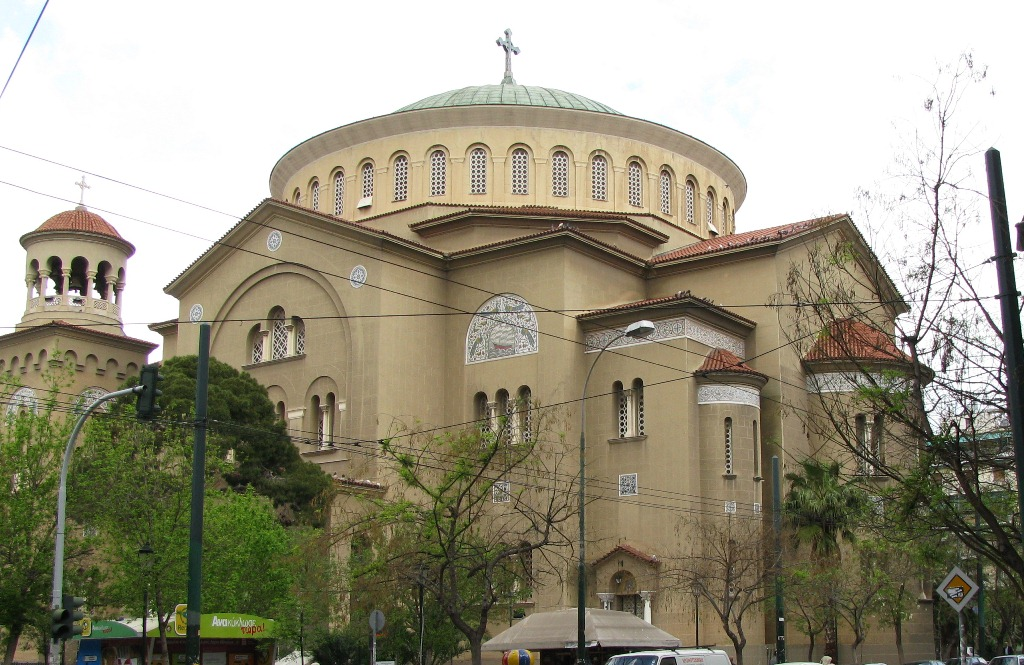

Religion
- Affiliation: Greek Orthodox
- District: Archbishopric of Athens

Location
- Location: Athens, Greece
- Interactive map of Saint Panteleimon of Acharnai
- Coordinates: 38.0075°N 23.728889°E

Architecture
- Architects: Ioannis Papadakis, Georgios Nomikos
- Style: Byzantine Revival architecture
- Completed: 1930 (partly)

Specifications
- Capacity: 2,400 m^{2}
- Length: 63 m (outer)
- Width: 48 m (outer)

The Church of Saint Panteleimon of Acharnai (Greek: Άγιος Παντελεήμων Αχαρνών) is a Greek Orthodox basilica located in central Athens, Greece. Measuring 63 meters in length and 48 meters in width, it is the largest church in the country. The church is situated in the heart of the modern Athens, near the busy Acharnon Avenue, which is one of the city's major thoroughfares, connecting central Athens to its northern suburbs.

Construction of the Church began on 12 September 1910, when the stone foundation was laid by King George I of Greece, and it was consecrated on 22 June 1930. The interior was painted by Greek artist Giannis Karouzos (1937–2013), who spent 23 years completing the decoration of approximately 6,000 square meters of wall surfaces.

Some sources identify the Cathedral of Saint Andrew in Patras, rather than the Church of Saint Panteleimon of Acharnai, as the largest Orthodox church in Greece.

== See also ==
- Agios Panteleimonas, Athens
- List of largest Eastern Orthodox church buildings
