= Empresa de China =

Planned invasion of China by the Iberian Union

Planned phases in the Empresa de China.

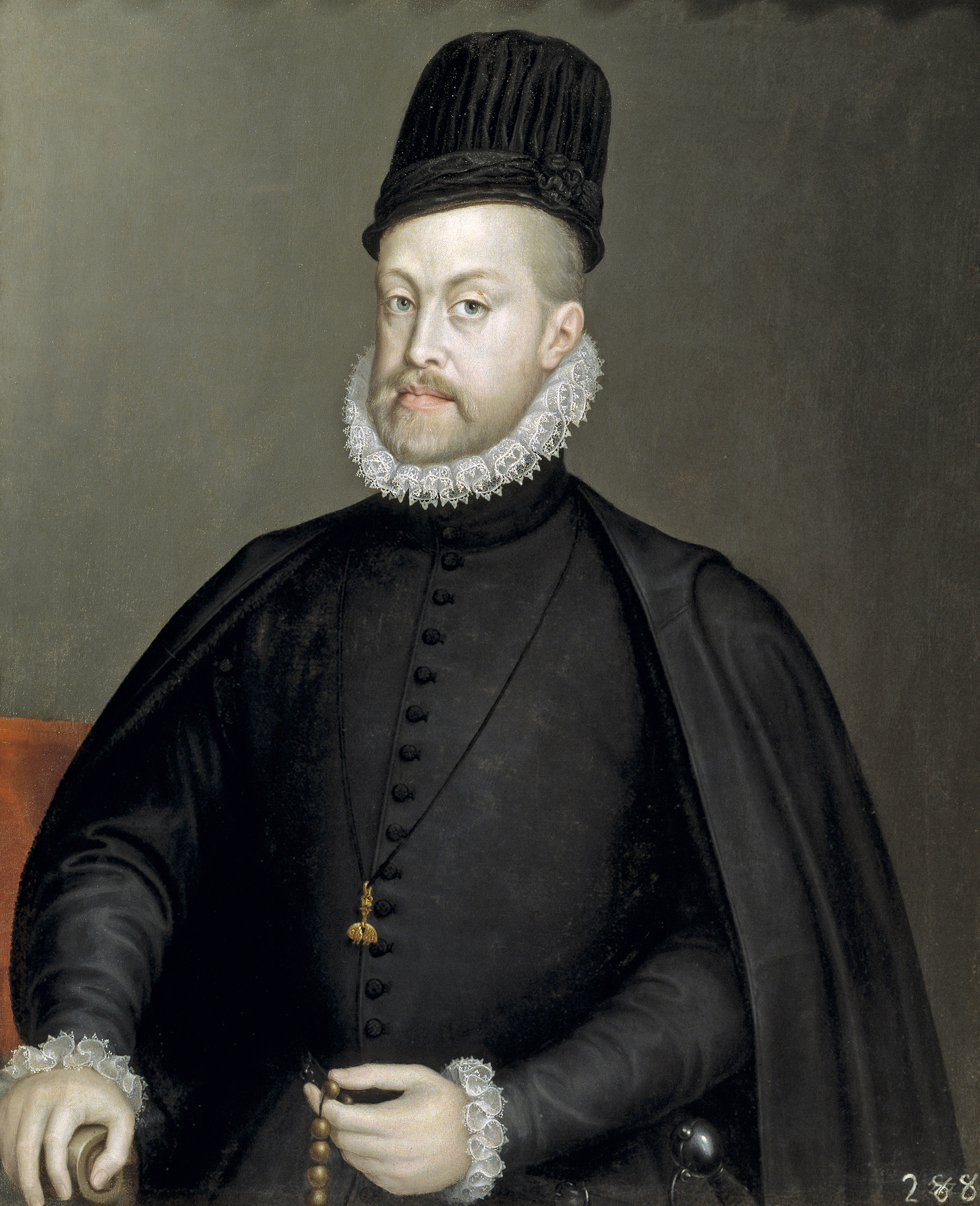
Philip II of Spain and I of Portugal, under whose reign the Chinese enterprise was developed.

The Empresa de China ("China Enterprise") was a long-time projected conquest of China by the Spanish Empire. Proposed repeatedly through the 16th century as a natural culmination of the conquest of the Philippines, it involved the invasion and assimilation of the Ming dynasty by a coalition that would include Spaniards, Portuguese, Spanish subjects of Spanish Philippines, and Japanese allies from the Toyotomi regency, as well as potential masses of ethnic Chinese allies.

Military conquest of China appeared viable by the reports of Christian missionaries and ambassadors, who described the Ming population as demobilized, inefficiently administered and easy to sublevate against their own governors, offering a situation similar to those of the Aztec and Inca Empires where control of the territory could be wrested away. Once conquered, the plan included mass evangelizing activities and the promotion of mestizaje between Iberians and Chinese, hoping to turn China into a source of strength to extend Hispanic control and Christianity across all of Asia. In a best case scenario, the Spanish Empire could aspire to form an oriental theater in the Ottoman–Habsburg wars.

The enterprise was formulated by several figures of the Hispanic Monarchy, but its main driving force would be a sector of the Society of Jesus led by Alonzo Sánchez, who clashed against other churchmen over the Vitorian legitimacy of a new conquest. In 1588, King Philip II sanctioned the establishment of the official Junta de la Empresa de China; yet naval reverses and objections by the Dominicans and Franciscans, who maintained that the venture imperiled their missionary work, brought it to a halt. The invasion of China briefly resurfaced later, with a new project to topple the Toyotomi regency and conquer Japan with the help of its own native uprising, potentially including Tokugawa Ieyasu, after which the Japanese armies would be used against China.

== History ==
The idea of expanding the Spanish Empire to China was first formulated in 1526 by Hernán Cortés, conqueror of the Aztec Empire, who sent a letter to King Charles V suggesting to begin the conquest of the Moluccas and China from their new ports in the Pacific coast of New Spain. However, due to the failure of the expeditions of García Jofre de Loaísa and Álvaro de Saavedra Cerón, the latter being sent by Cortés himself to rescue the survivors of the former, Charles abandoned his plans for the Pacific Ocean and forfeited his rights over Moluccas to the Kingdom of Portugal in the Treaty of Zaragoza.

=== First advances ===
Spanish expansion across the Pacific came finally with the expedition of Miguel López de Legazpi and the discovery of the tornaviaje (return route from the Philippines to Mexico) by his navigator Andrés de Urdaneta, which allowed the connection of the newly conquered Philippines to New Spain. Although the main goal was gaining access to the Asian spice trade, many of the expeditioners were fresh from the conquest of America and saw the archipelago as the first step to initiate the conquest of the nearby China. As small contingents of Spaniards had been enough to kickstart the fall of the Aztec and Inca Empires with native help, they believed the same scheme could be applied to China by securing the help of local ethnic Chinese, Japanese, and Austronesian allies. Legazpi himself chose Manila over Cebu as the Spanish base of operations due to its closeness to the Chinese trade routes.

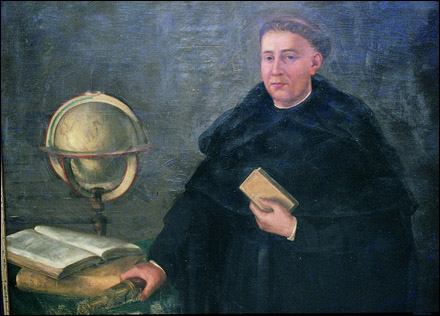
Martín de Rada, missionary and cosmographer.

An early report was sent to Viceroy Martín Enríquez de Almanza by Martín de Rada, one of the first western ambassadors to mainland China, in 1569. After his visit to the country, Rada stated that, even if China was densely populated, its population was not warlike and depended heavily on their numbers and fortifications for defense, hence it would not be necessary to gather a large Spanish army to subdue them. However, Rada advised for a campaign as peaceful as possible, based on persuasion and evangelization.

In 1575, after the Battle of Manila against the Chinese pirate Limahong, the Spanish Empire and the Ming dynasty built diplomatic bridges. Martín de Rada was sent to Fujian as part of a delegation with the goal of negotiating a Spanish settlement in Chinese soil like the Portuguese Macau. The project was fruitless, after which the governor of the Philippines, Francisco de Sande, opted to send letters to King Philip II proposing to attack China, claiming that 4,000-6,000 soldiers would suffice and that the effort would be helped by the tyranny to which the Chinese were subjected. However, Philip stated in 1577 that such a plan was not convenient at the moment and ordered Sande to cultivate the Ming's friendship. A similar suggestion reached Spain the following year by the hand of Diego García de Palacio, oídor of Guatemala, who proposed to begin a military route from Spain to the Philippines through Honduras, hoping to build a garrison strong enough to pacify the archipelago and make possible to take China as well. His plans were ignored. Sande's successor Gonzalo Ronquillo de Peñalosa also revisited the enterprise.

=== Influence of the Society of Jesus ===
The Empresa de China received a religious and political push from the Manila Synode, and in particular of the controversial Jesuit and diplomat Alonzo Sánchez, who visited the country in 1582 to confirm the loyalty of Macau after the dynastic union of Spain and Portugal. Sánchez suffered and witnessed arrests by the Chinese authorities, who were angry at not having been properly informed of the union, and after his return the following year, he was of the belief that only through military force would Christianity thrive in China.

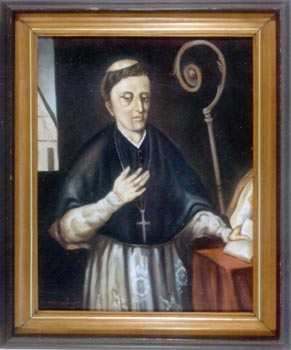
Domingo de Salazar, missionary and bishop.

Sánchez returned in time to participate in the third council of the synod, in 1583, where he shared the possibility of a conquest with Bishop Domingo de Salazar and missionary Antonio Sedeño, helped by a state of the local economy bad enough to encourage the possibility of expansion. Salazar brought to the table Francisco de Vitoria's thesis about just war, arguing that China had dealt enough abuse to Christians to justify a conflict. He collected reports that Chinese authorities were obstructing preaching activity, and also brought attestations from eight Spanish and Portuguese navigators mistreated in their contact with Chinese. Salazar gave also strategic suggestions, proposing to draw the help of Japan through their local network of Portuguese Jesuits, as well as confiscating the Chinese merchant ships in Manila to fund the initial war effort. However, by carefully following Vitoria's theories, he considered it was soon to decide whether the conquest was legitimated or not. The conclusions were contained in a document sent to King Philip.

Adding to those plans, the superior of the Jesuit mission in Japan, Francisco Cabral, informed that the domination of China would bring untold benefit of both material and spiritual nature, for which the existent Chinese imperial administration would be invaluable once assimilated. Based on his own experiences in Macau, he stated that the country was badly defended, and its population was prone to revolt against the mandarins that oppressed them, making it so that 10,000 Iberian soldiers would be enough for the invasion, joined by 2,000 Japanese soldiers he would recruit thanks to his order's contacts. He also offered himself as a spy to prepare the campaign, including also the services of Matteo Ricci and Michele Ruggieri. Cabral believed the conquest would finish itself as soon as they captured the Wanli Emperor in Beijing. Juan Bautista Román also believed it possible to assemble 7,000 Japanese Christian warriors.

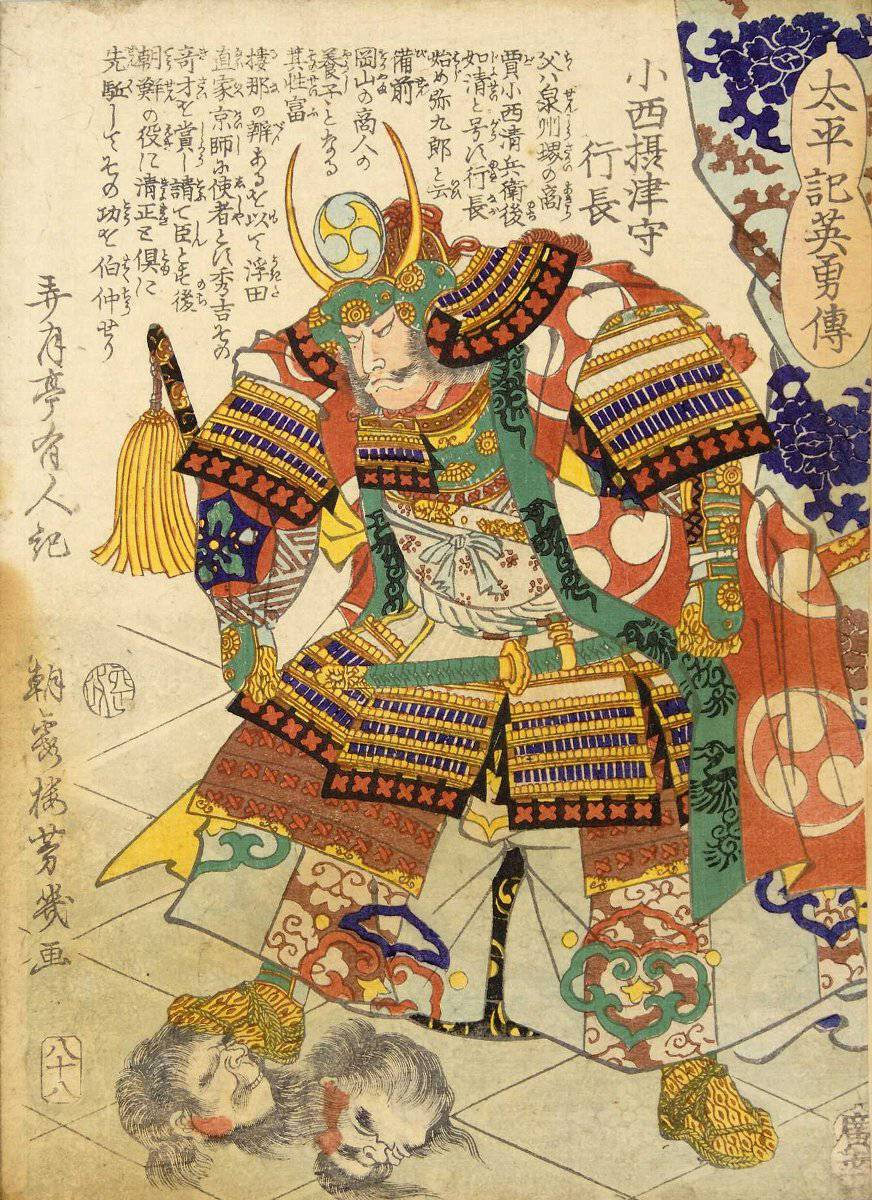
Konishi Yukinaga, Christian daimyo and admiral.

As the project advanced, the 1586 Memorial General of the Philippines included a document written by Sánchez, titled De la entrada de China en particular, where he collected an immensely detailed treatment of the conquest of China and the future government of the conquered lands. The plan involved gathering an armada led by the governor of the Philippines, containing 10,000-12,000 Iberian soldiers, 6,000 Visayans, and 5,000 Japanese recruited in Nagasaki, assisted by Jesuits due to their knowledge of the lands, and endowed with a purse of 200,000 pesos to strategically bribe mandarins and pay mercenaries. The assault would be two-pronged, with the Castilians invading China through Fujian and the Portuguese doing the same through Guangdong. Ricci and Ruggieri would be previously recalled to serve as consultants and negotiators with the Chinese authorities, and the submission of the latter would be surveyed under the Vitorian policies of preventing unnecessary violence and abuse of the civilian population.

Once the country was subjected to Spanish control, they would proceed to its Christianization, founding encomiendas and nobiliary properties, and building Christian infrastructure like hospitals, universities, and monasteries, helped by a plan of mestizaje that would promote interracial marriage between Iberian conquistadors and Chinese women. Success would mean an enormous advance for the Hispanic universal monarchy, as a Spanish China would become an invaluable base to extend their control across Southeast Asia and the Indian Ocean, lending forces to subdue and Christianize Cochinchina, Siam, Kampuchea, India, Borneo, Sumatra, Moluccas, and other lands, to the point of making it possible to gather regional allies against the Ottoman Empire and opening an eastern front against it.

1587 saw preparations for war in Manila, building fortifications under Sedeño's supervision and cramming weapons and supplies. The same year, fortuitously, a Japanese delegation came from Hirado under the command of Konishi Yukinaga, a Japanese Christian and grand admiral of Toyotomi Hideyoshi, to offer 6,000 vassals and "all the people and soldiers [Spain] asked" to collaborate with any invasion against China, Borneo, Siam, or Moluccas.

=== Deliberations and abandonment ===
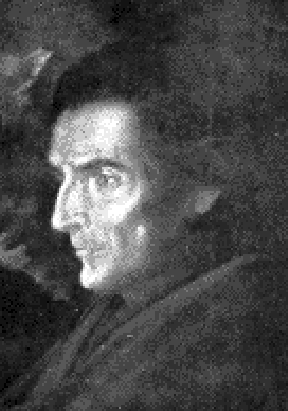
José de Acosta, theologian and anthropologist.

Sánchez' and Salazar's project, however, found opposition in another Jesuitic current headed by Alessandro Valignano and Superior General Claudio Acquaviva, who saw the Empresa de China as an unjustified violation of the Christian rule of evangelizing peacefully. Portuguese Jesuits also saw it as a danger to their kingdom's economic interests. When Sánchez sailed off to Spain in June 1586 in order to inform about the state of the Philippines, and secretly to address the realization of the Empresa, Acquaviva assigned him supervision under renowned theologian and historian José de Acosta, who was ordered to refute his philosophical bases. Acosta wrote an entire treaty utilizing Francisco de Vitoria's thesis to criticize the invasion of China. The protests, added to Sánchez's own actions in New Spain, where he worked to stop a cadre of Dominican missionaries from reaching China in order not to have them obstructing the warring effort, ended up driving a wedge between Salazar and him.

Sánchez could meet Philip II in December 1587 and, despite Acosta's presence, found the chance to send the king a copy of his document. His aspirations were successful and, as soon as the preparations of the Spanish Armada allowed it, Philip authorized the creation of an official Junta para la Empresa de China in March 1588. The council was composed by the Consejo de Indias chairman Hernando de Vega y Fonseca, General Alonso de Vargas, Admiral Joan de Cardona i Requesens, royal secretaries Juan de Idiáquez y Olazábal and Cristóbal de Moura, inquisitor Pedro Moya, and four members of the Castilian Council of War. Its development, however, was interrupted by the news of the Armada's failure in August, in midst of new protests by Dominicans and Franciscans that believed the project endangered their own workings. Ultimately, royal interest for the Empresa waned for good.

The new governor of the Philippines, Gómez Pérez Dasmariñas, was chosen by Sánchez's suggestion, but he received explicit orders to avoid military conflict with China. On the opposite, he became entangled in diplomatic tension against Toyotomi, who seemed to demand vassalage from the Spanish Philippines for his invasion of Korea, and whom local spies attributed the idea to invade the Philippines in case of a negative answer. Although this twist never happened, during Juan Cobo's embassy Dasmariñas was advised to seek an alliance with China against Japan and not vice versa. When Dasmariñas was succeeded by his son Luis, the conquest of China was briefly revived in an indirect way. The priest Martín de la Ascensión proposed an equally complex plan to invade Japan, where native allies could be easily found too, and whose armies, once pledged to the Hispanic Monarchy, could be used in campaigns against China and other nearby lands. A considered local ally, aside from the usual Japanese Christians, was the lord later known as Tokugawa Ieyasu. The San Felipe incident and its consequences, however, buried the project.

== See also ==
- El Piñal
- Sino-Spanish conflicts

== Sources ==
- Comellas García-Lera, José Luis (2009). Páginas de la historia. Rialp. ISBN 9788432137969.
- Hortigüela, Juan Hernández (2018). De Filipinas a Vietnam: Españoles con la cruz y la espada. Punto Rojo. ISBN 9788417768119.
- De Laurentis, Ernesto (2009). Evangelización y prestigio. Primeros encuentros entre España y Corea. Verbum. ISBN 9788479625337.
- Mayer Celis, Leticia (2021). Rutas de incertidumbre: Ideas alternativas sobre la génesis de la probabilidad, siglos XVI y XVII. Fondo de Cultura Económica. ISBN 9786071643957.
- Ollé, Manel (2000). La invención de China: percepciones y estrategias filipinas respecto a China durante el siglo XVI. Otto Harrassowitz Verlag. ISBN 9783447043366.
- Ollé, Manel (2002). La empresa de china: de la Armada Invencible al Galeón de Manila. Acantilado. ISBN 9788495359858.
- Sola, Diego (2018). El Cronista de China: Juan González de Mendoza, entre la misión, el imperio y la historia. Edicions Universitat Barcelona. ISBN 9788491680376.
- Sola, Emilio (1999). Historia de un desencuentro. España y Japón, 1580-1619. Archivo de la Frontera. ISBN 9788469058596.
- Thomas, Hugh (2015). World Without End: Spain, Philip II, and the First Global Empire. Random House. ISBN 9780812998122.
