= Boxer Codex =

Spanish illuminated manuscript

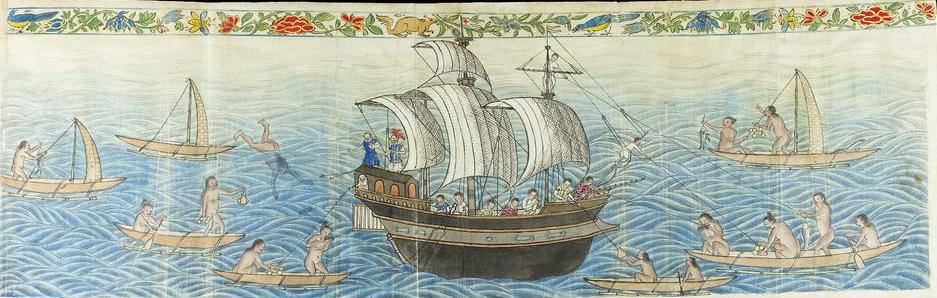
Reception of the Manila galleon by the Chamorro in the Ladrones Islands, from the Boxer Codex, c. 1590

The Boxer Codex is a late-16th-century Spanish manuscript produced in the Philippines. It contains 75 colored illustrations of the peoples of China, the Philippines, Japan, Java, the Moluccas, the Ladrones, and Siam. About 270 pages of Spanish text describe these places, their inhabitants and customs. An additional 88 smaller drawings show mythological deities and demons, and both real and mythological birds and animals copied from popular Chinese texts and books in circulation at the time.

The English historian Charles Ralph Boxer purchased the manuscript in 1947 from the collection of Lord Ilchester in London. Boxer recognized the importance of what he called the "Manila Manuscript" and published a paper in 1950 with a detailed description of the codex. He made the manuscript freely available to other researchers for study, and it became known as the Boxer Codex. Boxer eventually sold it to Indiana University, where it is held by the Lilly Library.

== Description and contents ==
The manuscript was written around circa 1590 in primarily Early Modern Spanish with some labels in Early Manila Hokkien written in Spanish orthography and Classical Chinese and contains illustrations of ethnic groups in the Philippines, across Southeast Asia, and in East Asia and Micronesia at the time of early Spanish contact. It also contains Taoist mythological deities and demons, and both real and mythological birds and land animals copied from popular Chinese texts and books in circulation at the time. Aside from a description of and historical allusions to what are now the Philippines and various other Far Eastern countries, the codex also contains 97 hand-drawn color paintings and illustrations depicting peoples and animals of the Philippines, the Indonesian Archipelago, Japan, Taiwan, China, and Mainland Southeast Asia. The first illustration is an oblong fold-out, 74 are full-page colored illustrations, and the remaining are arranged four to a page on 22 pages (with some of the quarters remaining blank). Most of the drawings appear to have been copied or adapted from materials brought to the Philippines from China by Martín de Rada: the Classic of Mountains and Seas and books from the shenmo genre, which depict deities and demons. The remaining drawings represent individuals, often a male and female pair, as inhabitants from tributaries of China and Taiwan with their distinctive costume; some of these have been refashioned as warriors. The depictions of inhabitants from Chinese tributaries may have been copied from a pre-existing source, drawn from memory, or perhaps even drawn according to instruction given by Rada or one of the other Europeans who visited China. At least 15 illustrations deal with the inhabitants of the Philippine Archipelago.

== History and provenance ==
The Boxer Codex does not bear any direct statement of authorship or dates of production and there is no dedication that might indicate who was the patron of the work or for whom the work was intended. Its contents indicate that it was written in Manila in the early 1590s. The manuscript was likely compiled at the direction of Gómez Pérez Dasmariñas, the Spanish Governor-General of the Philippines, or his son, Luis Pérez Dasmariñas.

The Boxer Codex depicts the Tagalogs, Visayans, Zambals, Cagayanes or possibly Ibanags, and Negritos of the Philippines in vivid color. The paintings' technique and the use of Chinese paper, ink, and paints suggests that the artist may have been Chinese.

It is believed that the original owner of the manuscript was Luis Pérez Dasmariñas, son of Governor General Gómez Pérez Dasmariñas, the Spanish Governor-General of the Philippines. Luis succeeded his father in office as governor-general. Since Spanish colonial governors kept extensive written reports of the territories they governed, it is likely that the manuscript was written on the governor's orders.

The manuscript's earliest known modern owner was Lord Ilchester. The codex was among what remained in his collection when his estate, Holland House in London, was bombed on September 27, 1940, during the Blitz. It was auctioned in 1947 and came into the possession of Charles Ralph Boxer, an authority on the Far East, and whom it is named. It is now owned by the Lilly Library at Indiana University.

== Illustrations in the Boxer Codex ==
=== Natives of the Philippines ===
^{(All captions below based on source)}

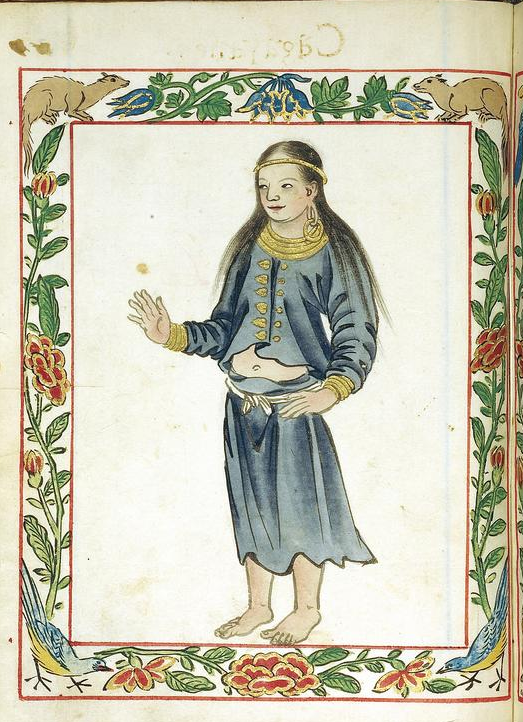
A Lady from the Cagayan Valley (Possibly Ibanag)

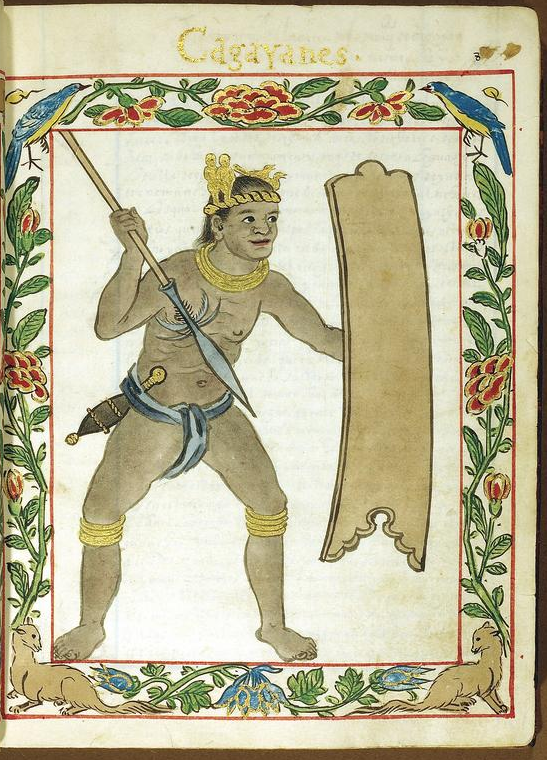
Warrior from Cagayan Valley (Possibly Ibanag)

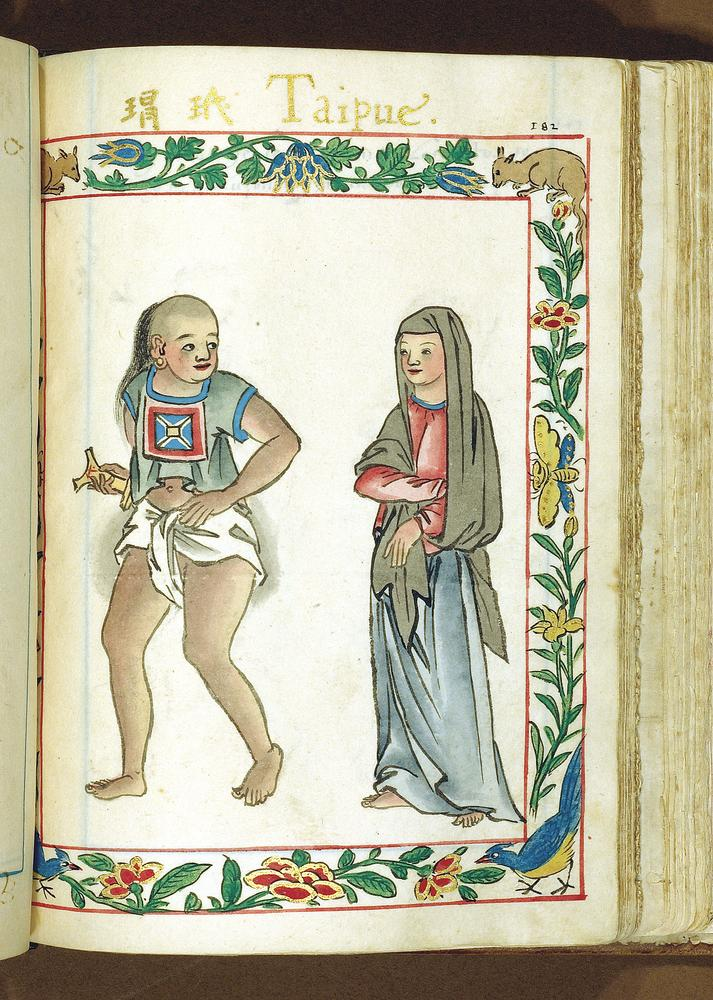
Couple with tied long hair and Kampilan hilt from Taimei Anchorage, Lingayen Gulf, Luzon, Philippines (Possibly Pangasinense)

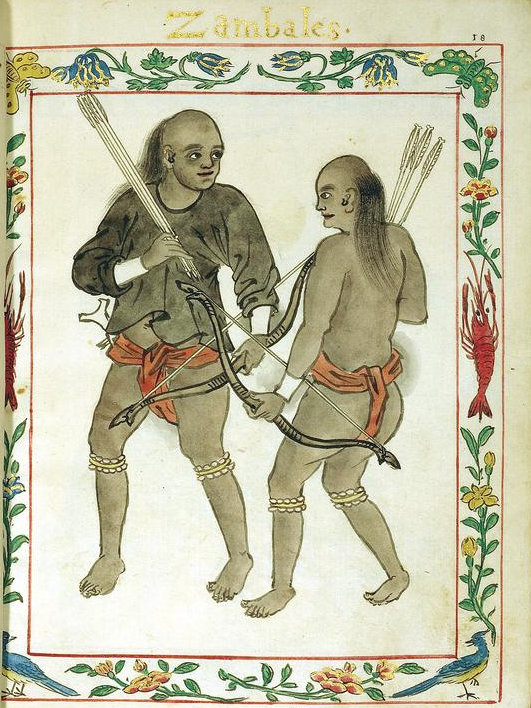
Zambal hunters from Zambales

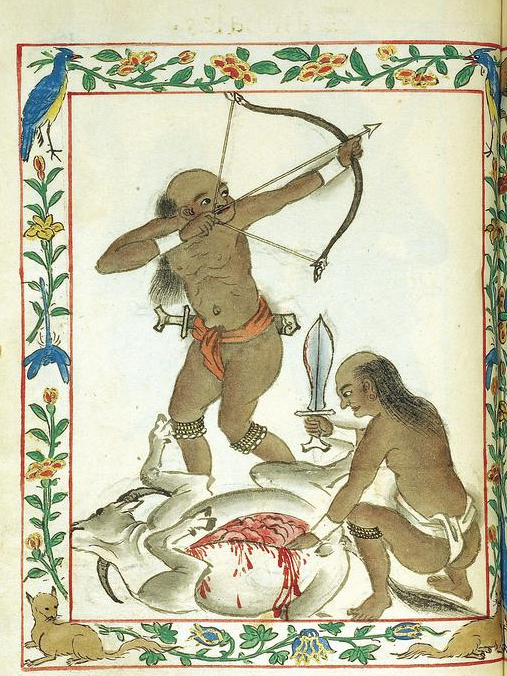
Zambal hunters hunting

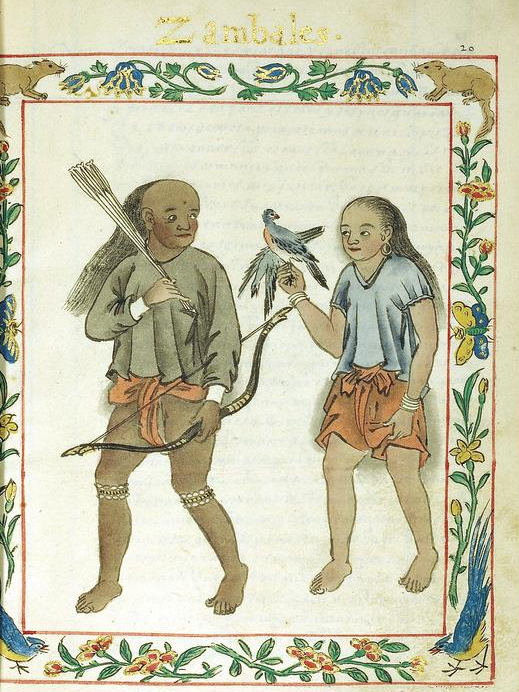
A couple belonging to the Zambal warrior-hunter class. The image shows a culture of falconry

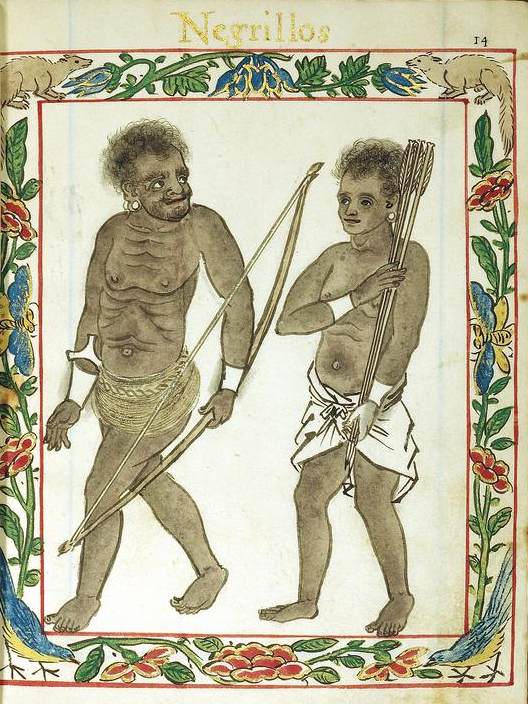
Aeta or Negrito hunters

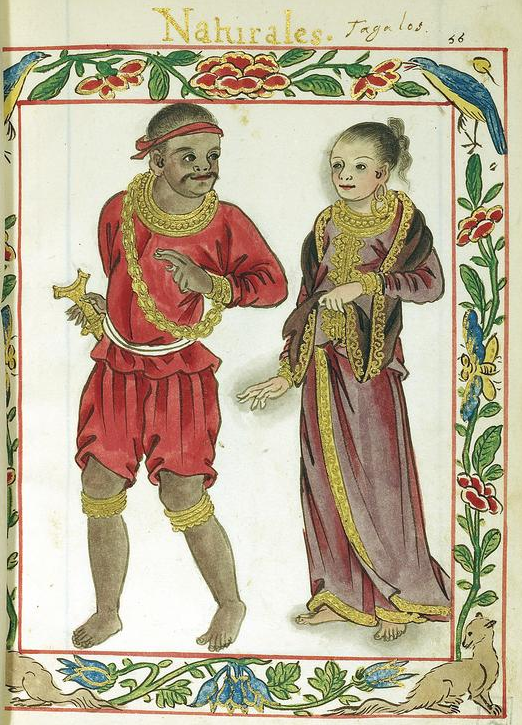
Tagalog royalty in red (the distinctive color of his class) with his wife.

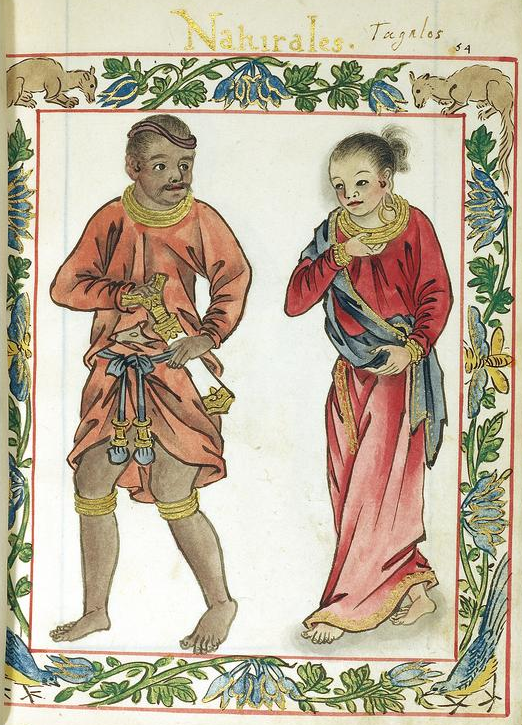
Tagalog royal couple in red, the distinctive color of their class.

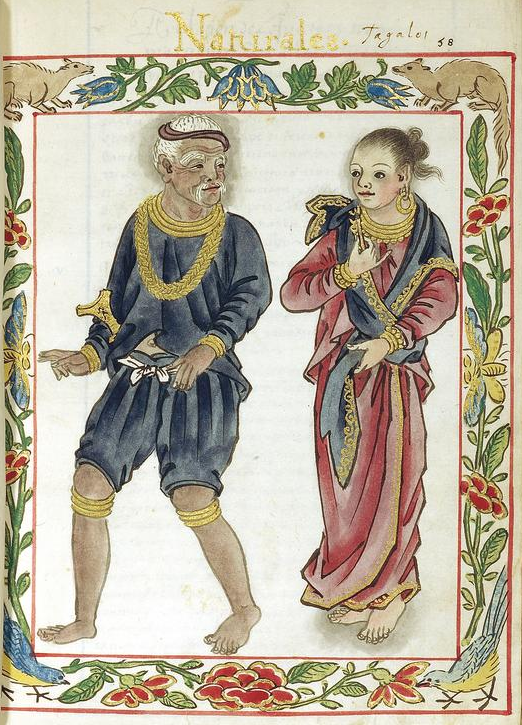
Tagalog maginoo (noble class) wearing blue (the distinctive color of his class) with his wife.

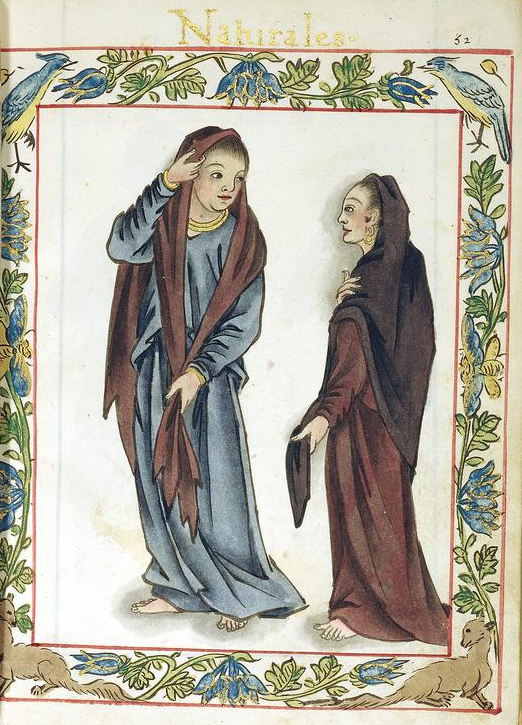
Tagalog common women wearing simple clothes and headscarves (likely Muslims from Maynila in the 1500s)

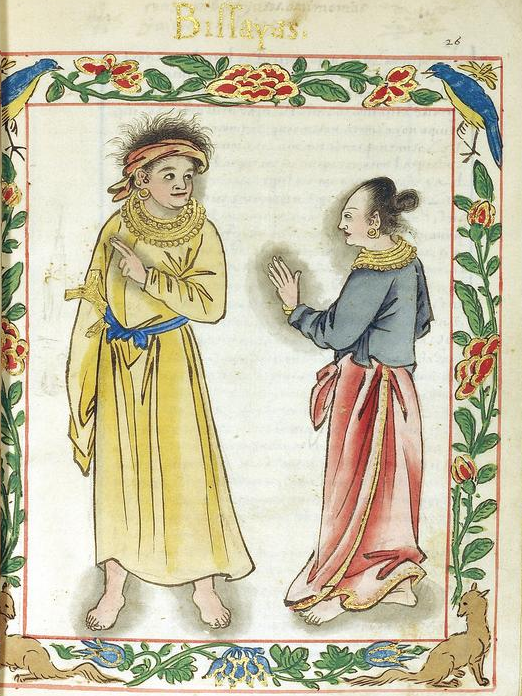
Visayan kadatuan (royal) couple

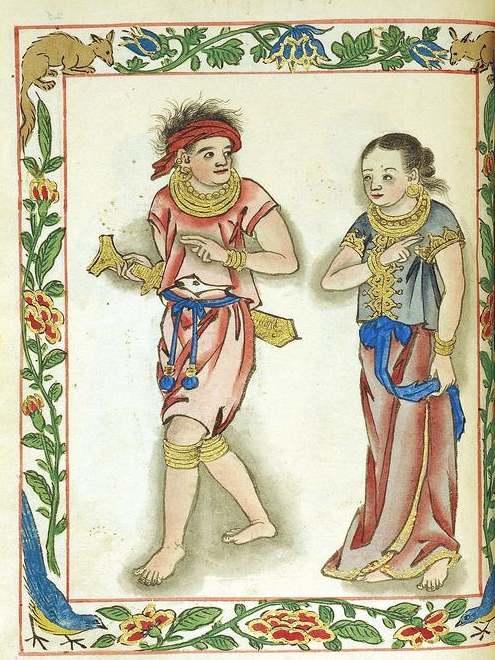
Visayan kadatuan (royal) holding a Khanda sword, alongside his wife wearing red, the distinctive color of their class.

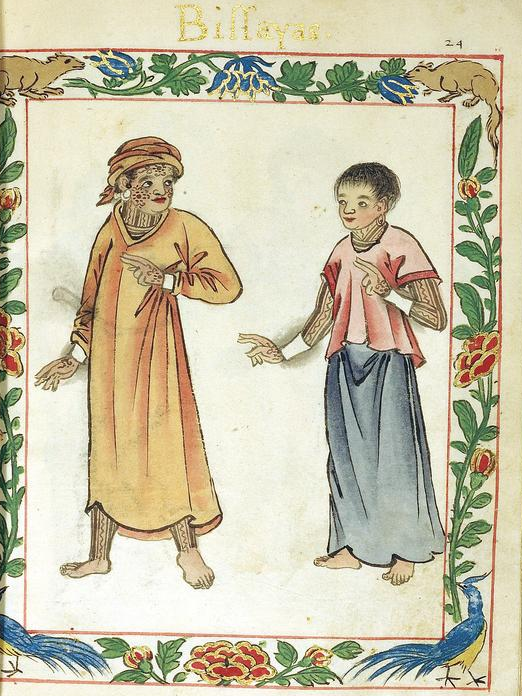
A Pintado (Possibly Cebuano or Waray) couple of the timawa or tumao (martial-feudal class; later demoted to freedman status)

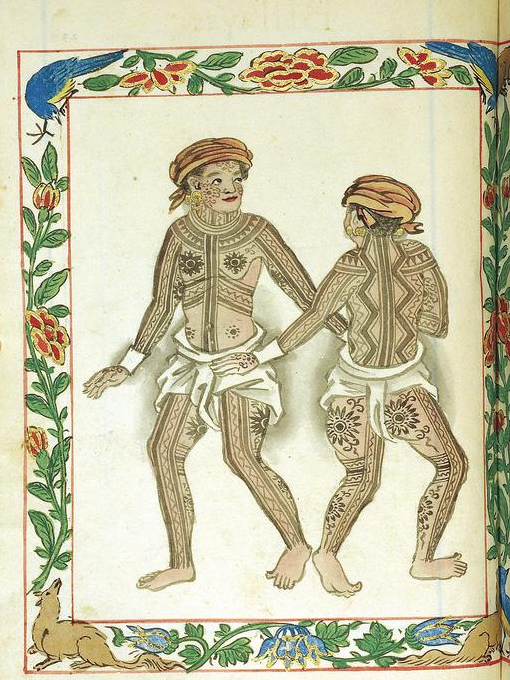
Pintados (Possibly Cebuano or Waray) from Bohol, showing their patok or tattoos

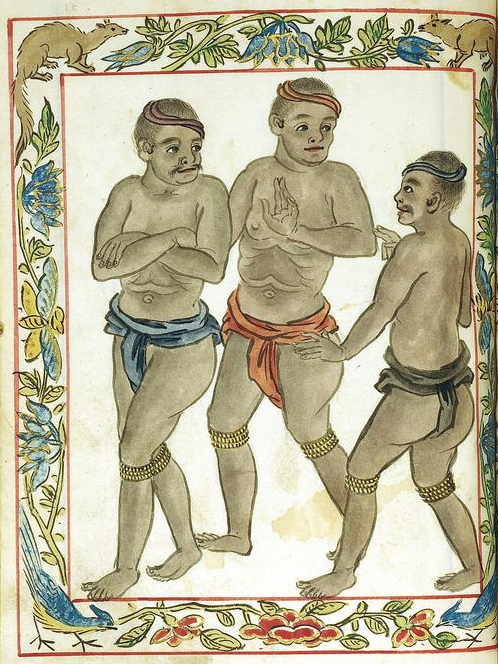
Native Visayan uripon (slaves) adorned with gold.

=== Foreigners ===
^{(All captions below based on source)}

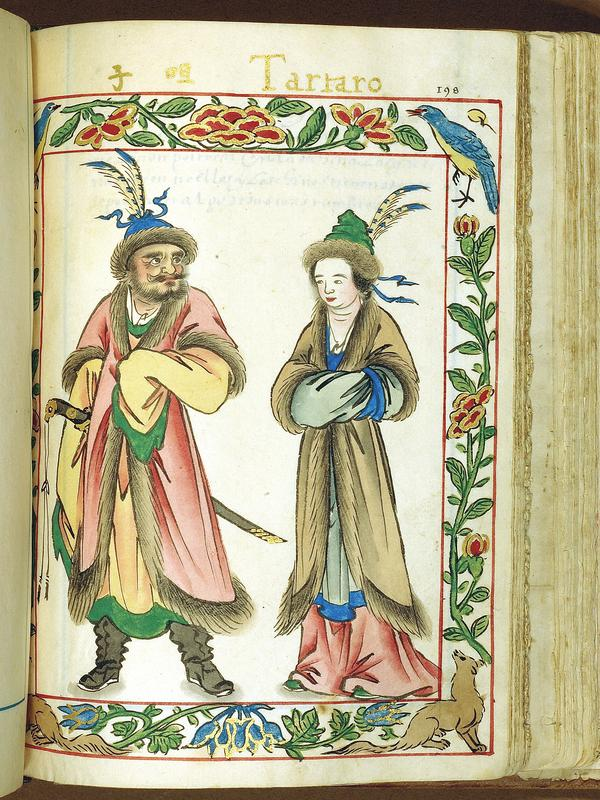
"Tatar" (Mongol) noble with wife from Tartary (Mongolia)

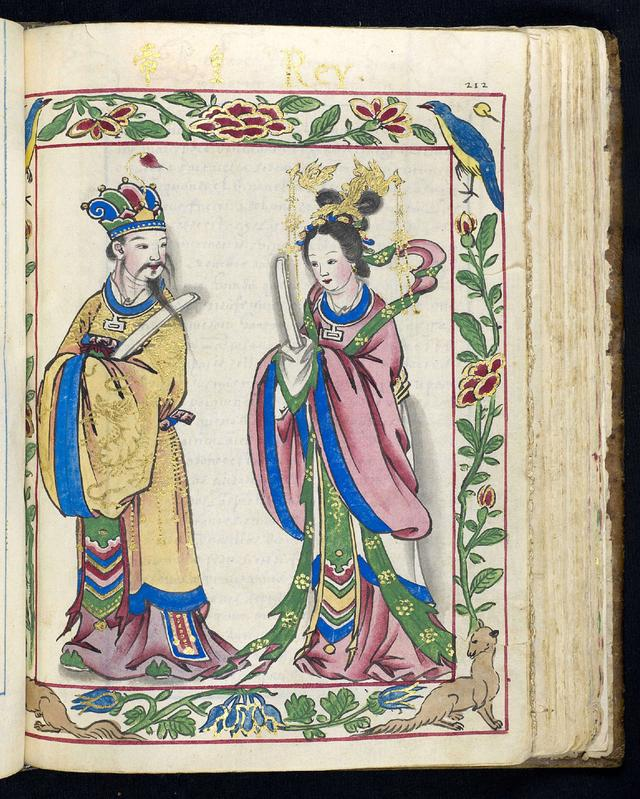
Emperor and empress of Ming dynasty China

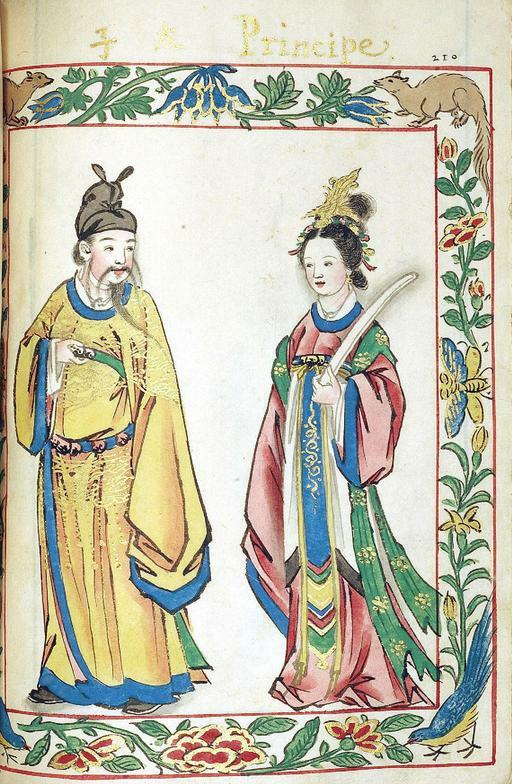
Noble prince and consort from Ming dynasty China

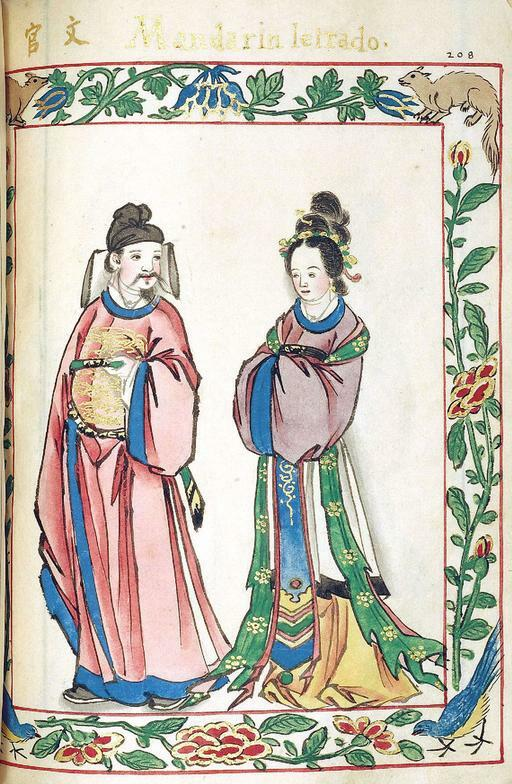
Mandarin bureaucrat with wife from Ming dynasty

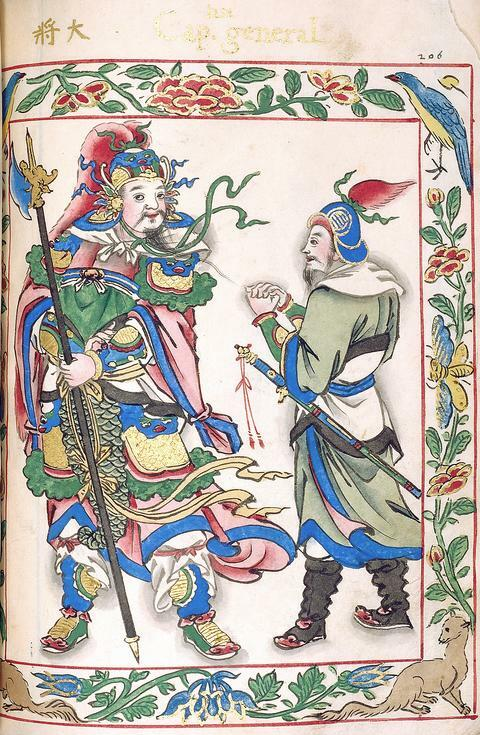
Ming dynasty Chinese general with attendant

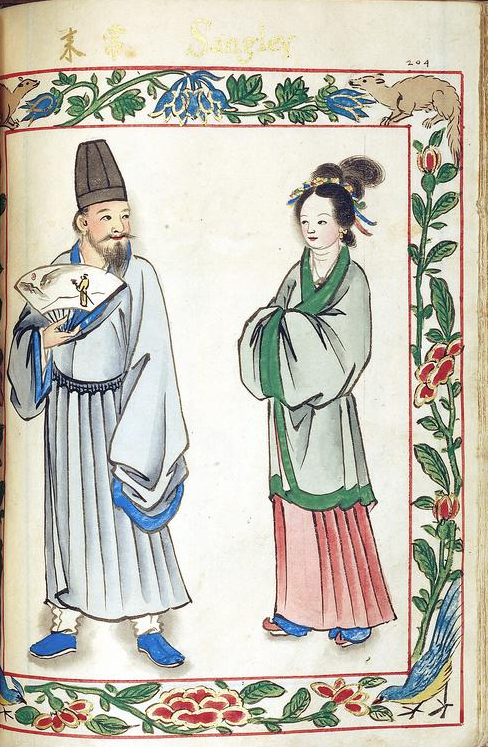
Han Chinese "Sangley" couple living in Manila, Philippines wearing hanfu from Ming dynasty

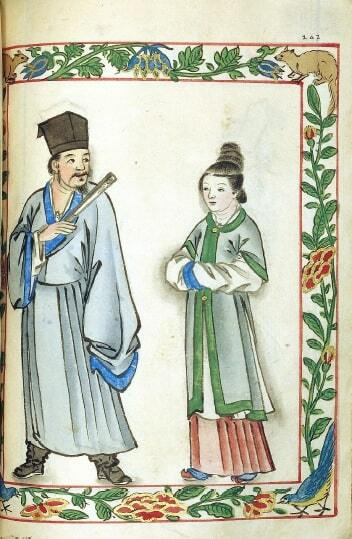
Another Sangley couple

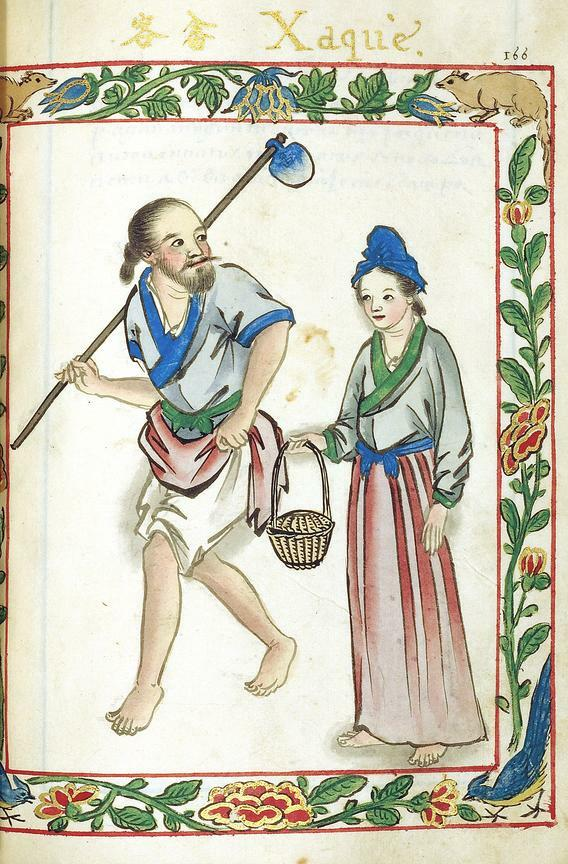
She Chinese merchant with wife from Ming dynasty China

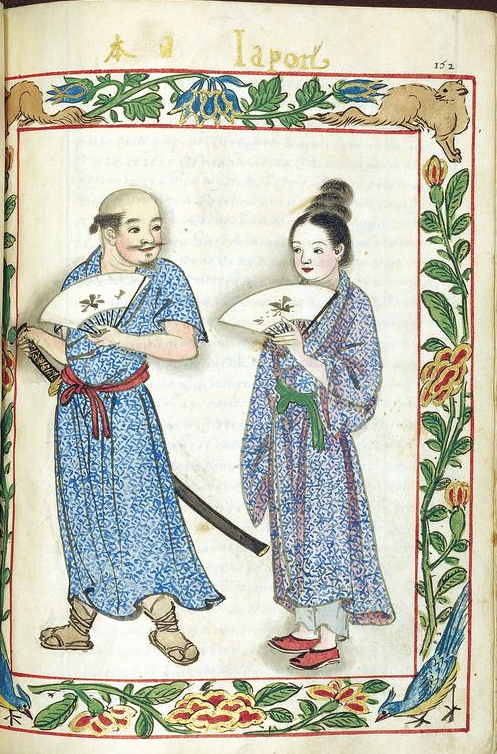
Japanese samurai couple wearing yukata with the woman's hair styled in Chinese fashion

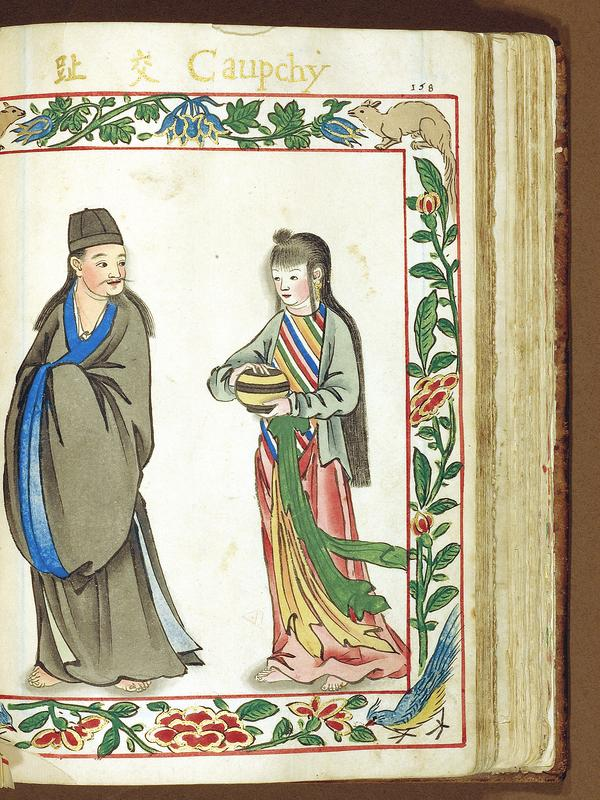
Vietnamese noble with wife from Tonkin, Đại Việt (Vietnam) under either the Mạc dynasty or Lê dynasty at that time

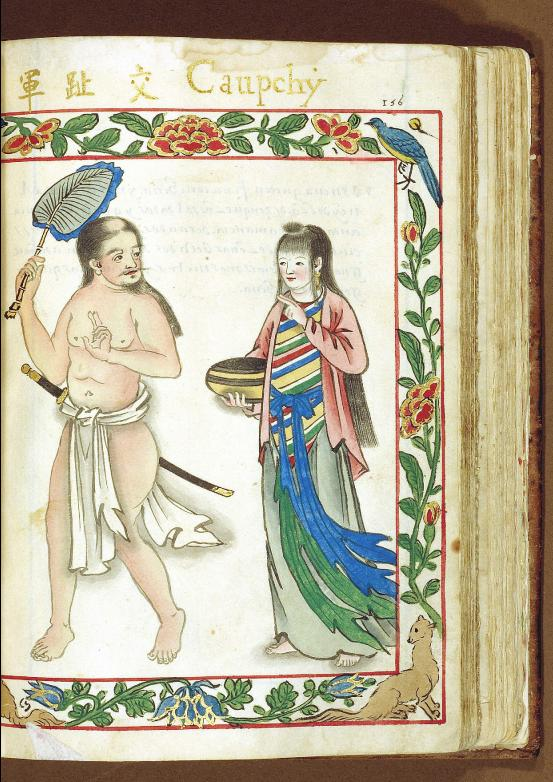
Labelled as a Vietnamese warrior with woman from Tonkin, Đại Việt (Vietnam), but the man is instead depicted as a nụy khấu

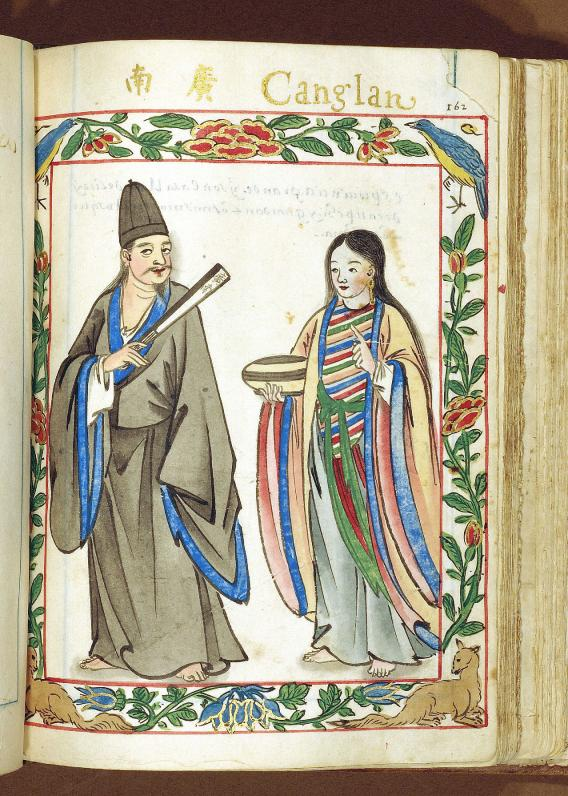
Vietnamese noble with wife from Quảng Nam, Đại Việt (Vietnam) under the Nguyễn lords at the time.

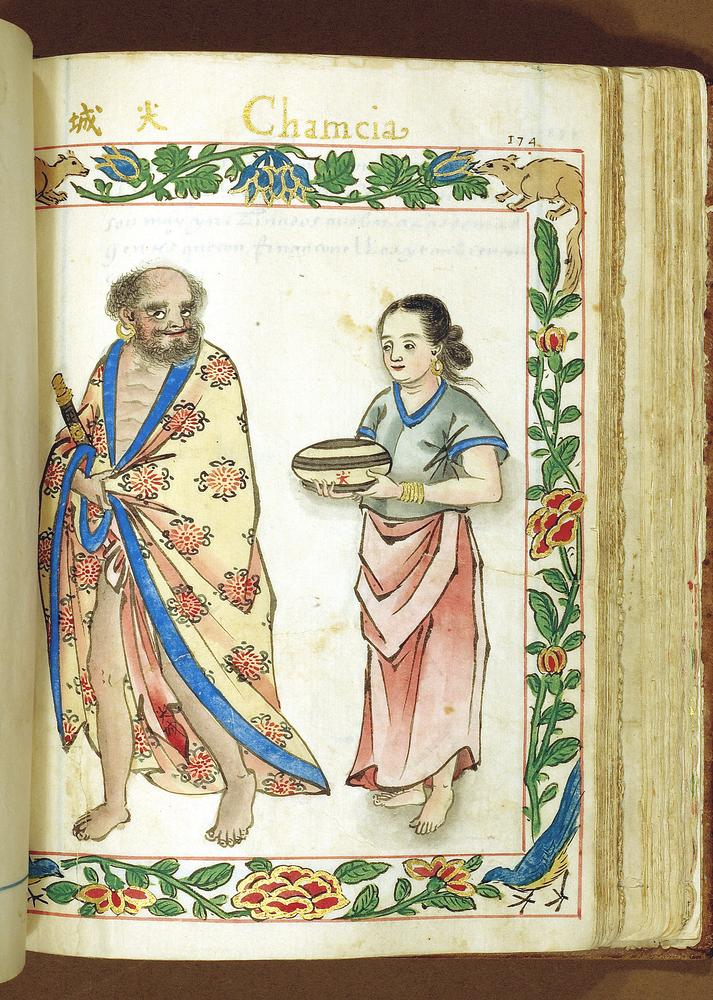
Cham couple from Champa (in modern-day Ninh Thuận, Southern Vietnam)

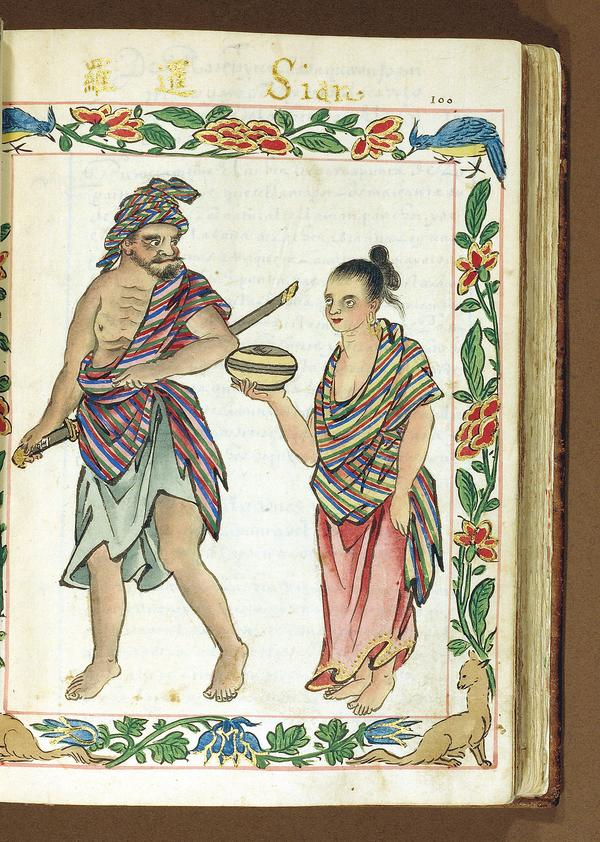
Siamese (Thai) warrior with wife from Siam (Thailand)

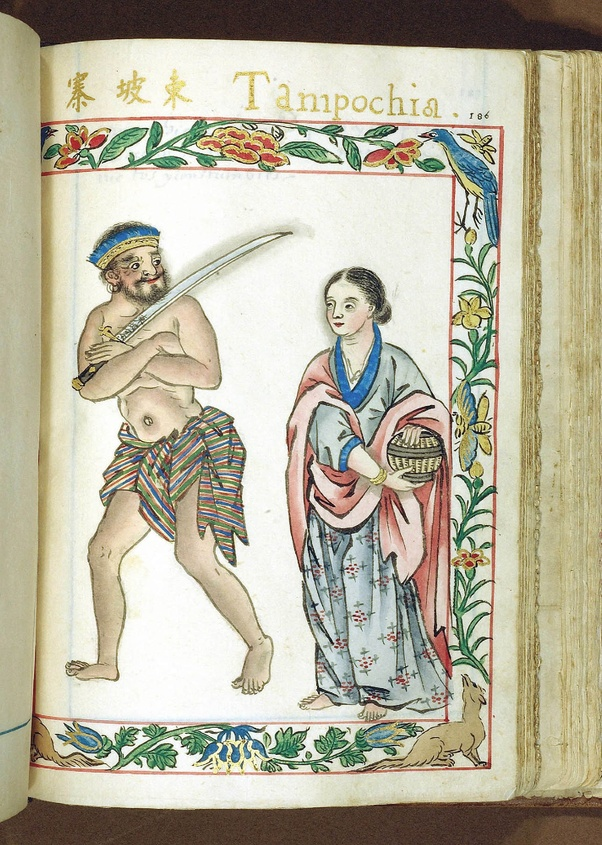
Khmer couple from Kampuchea (Cambodia)

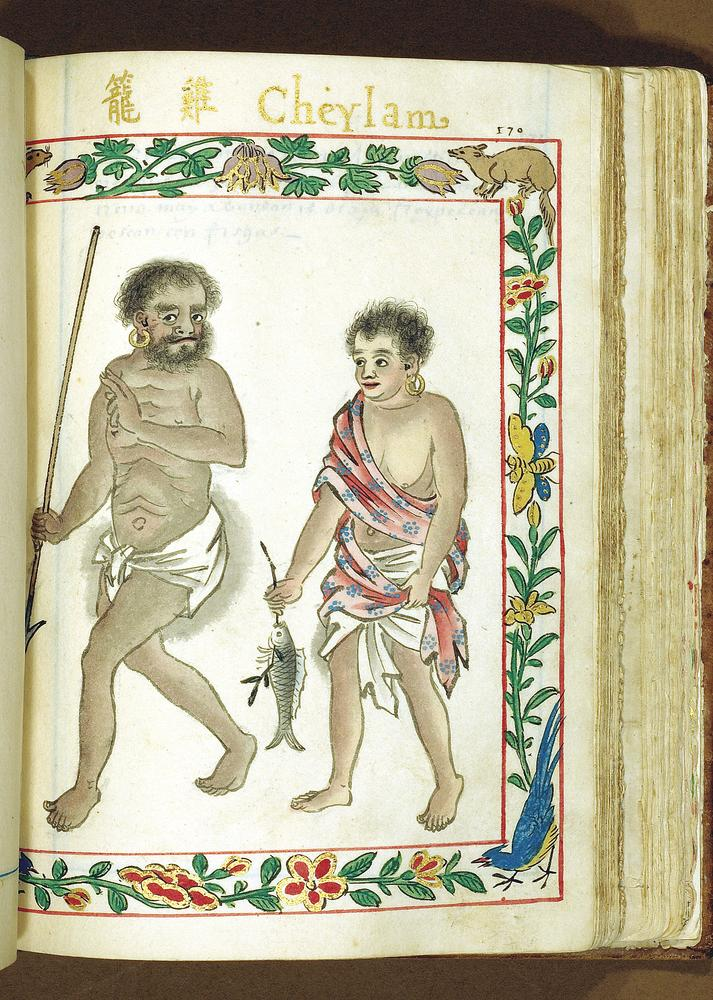
Taiwanese aboriginal headhunter couple from Keelung, Spanish Formosa (in modern-day Taiwan)

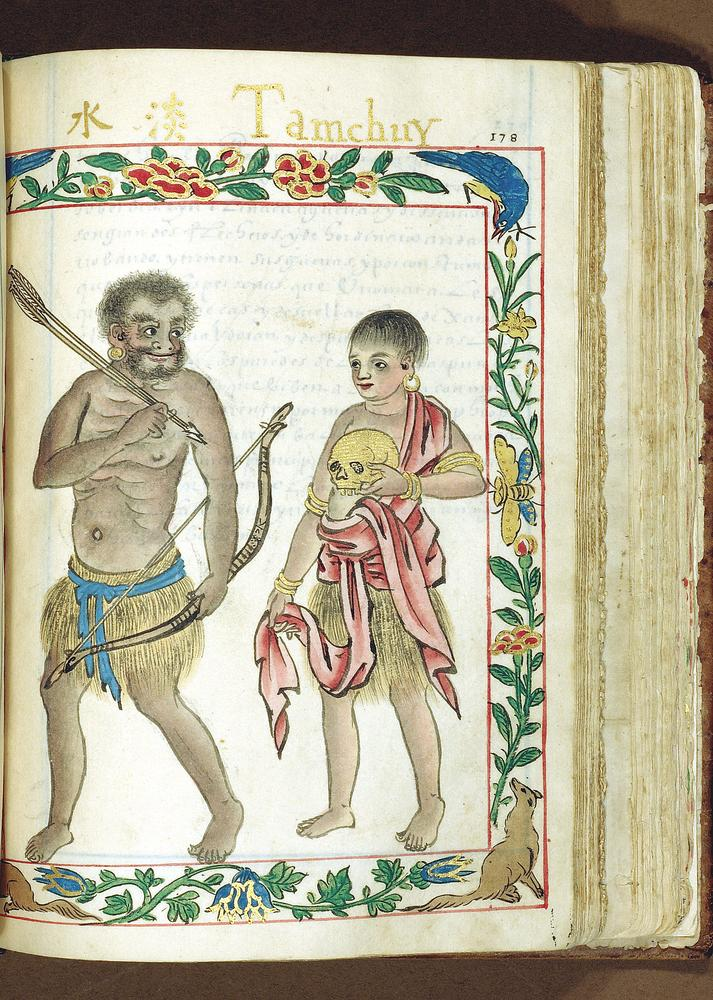
Taiwanese aboriginal headhunter couple from Tamsui, Spanish Formosa (in modern-day Taiwan)

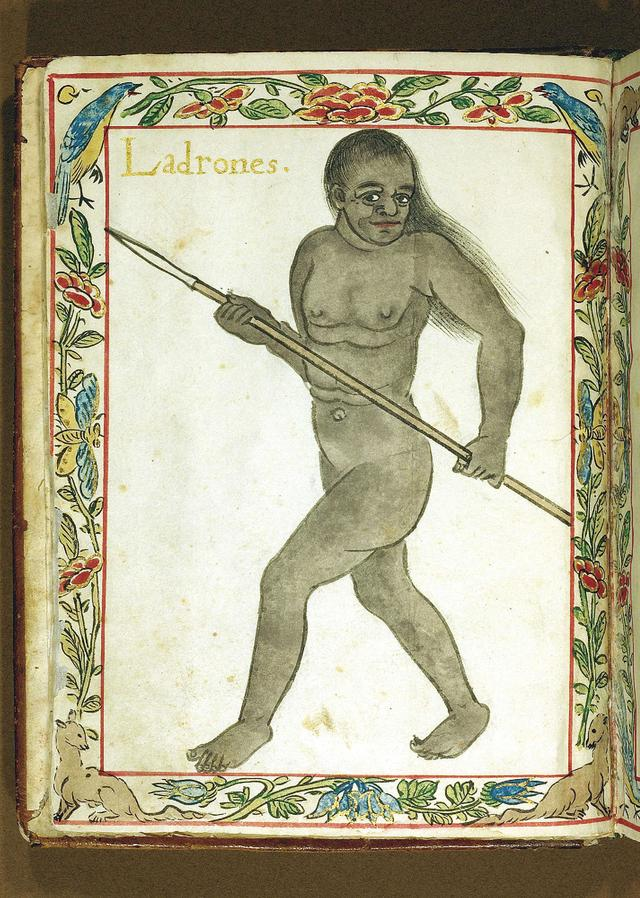
Chamorro hunter from Marianas Islands (Guam/Northern Marianas) with spear

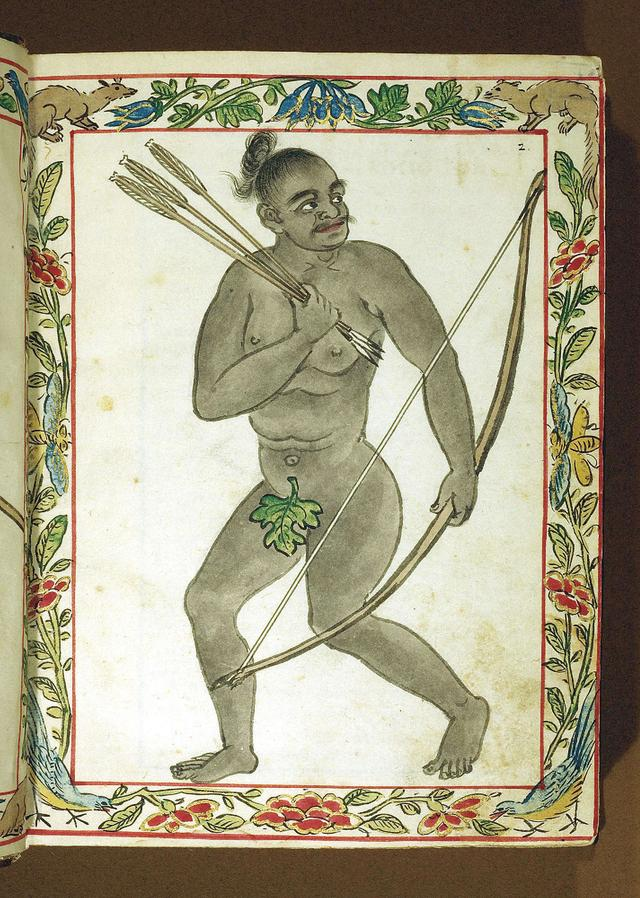
Chamorro hunter from Marianas Islands (Guam/Northern Marianas) with bow

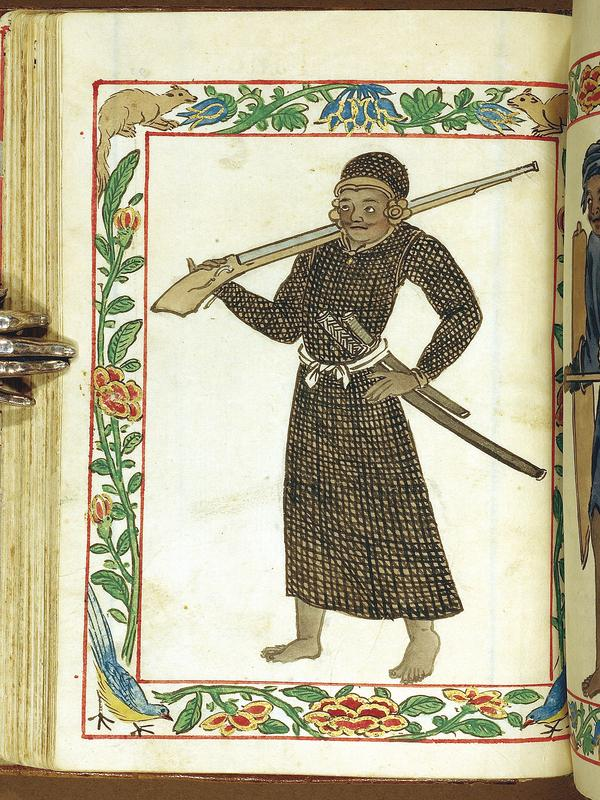
Javanese warrior with musket and swords

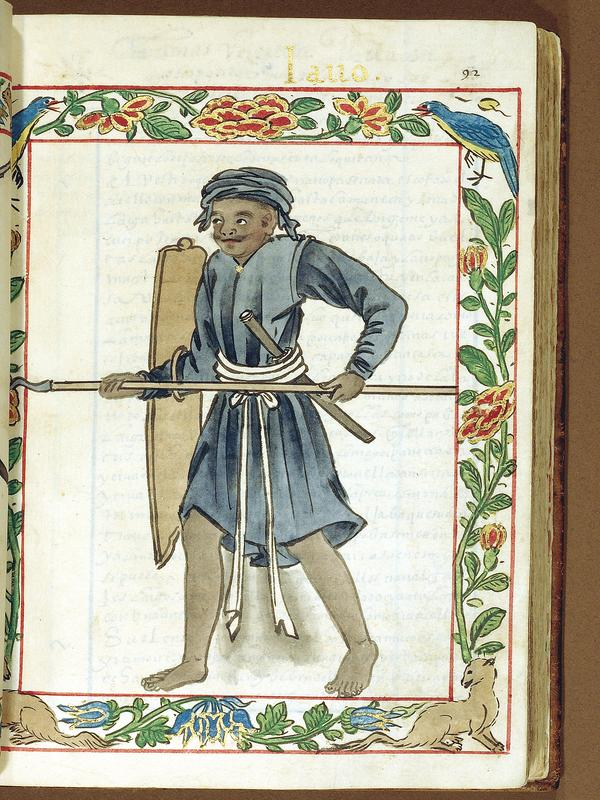
Javanese warrior with a spear and shield from "Iaua" (modern-day Java, Indonesia)

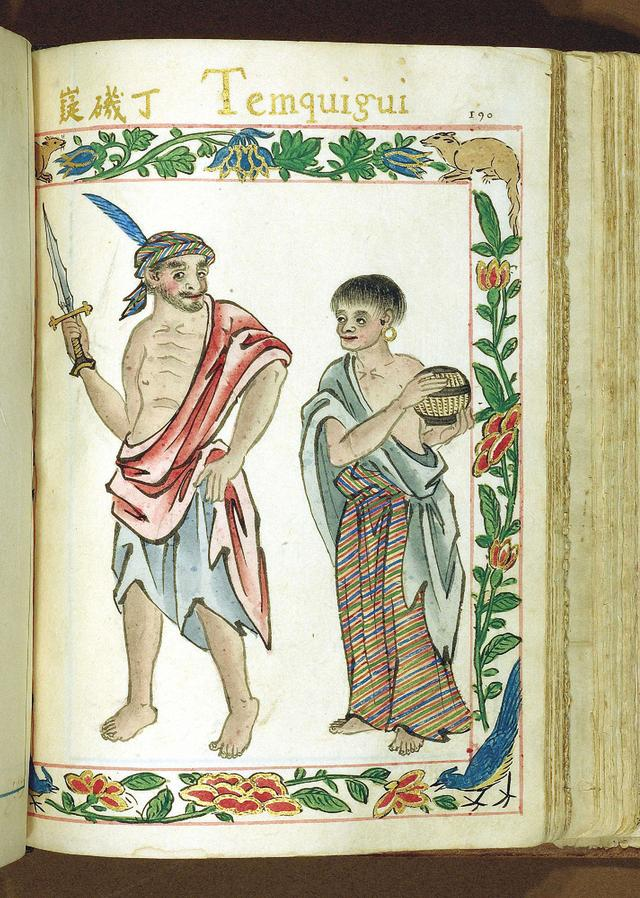
Malay couple from the Terangganu Sultanate (in modern-day Malaysia)

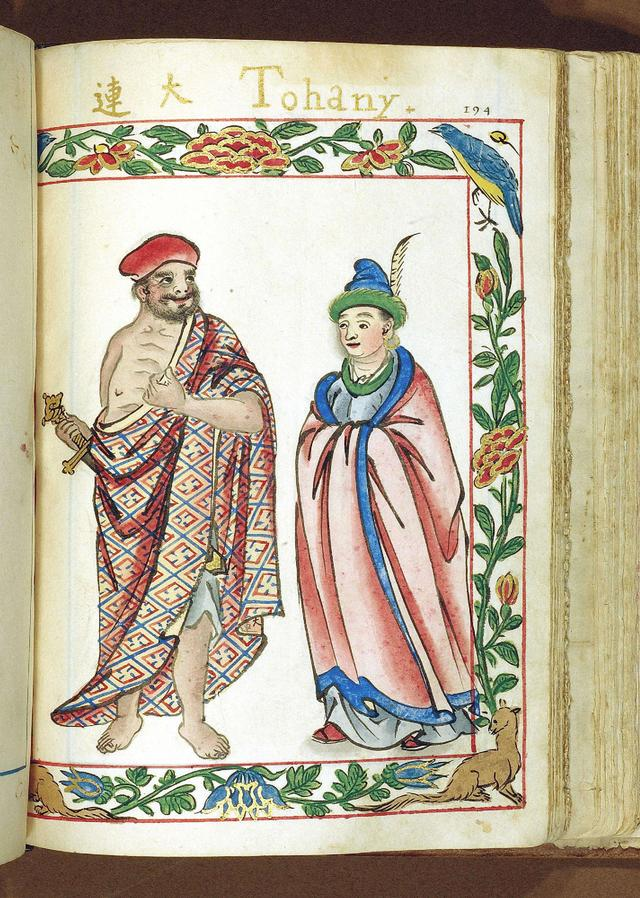
Patani couple

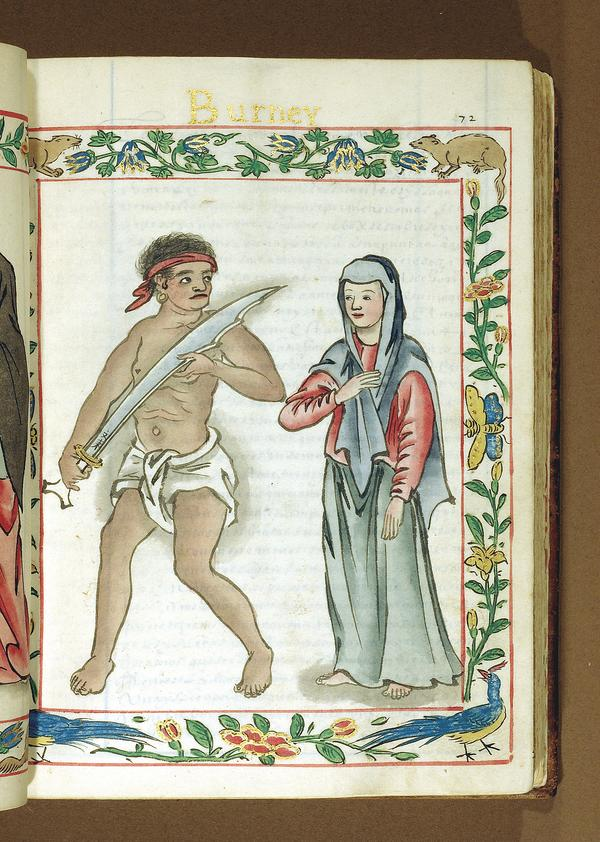
Bruneian warrior with wife

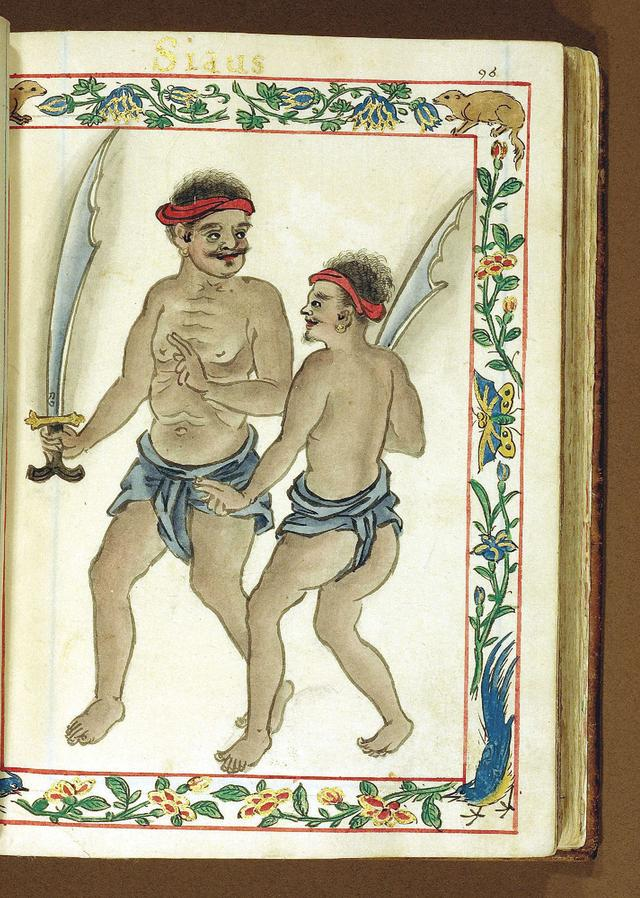
Sangirese warriors from Siau Island, Sangir Archipelago (in modern-day North Sulawesi, Indonesia)

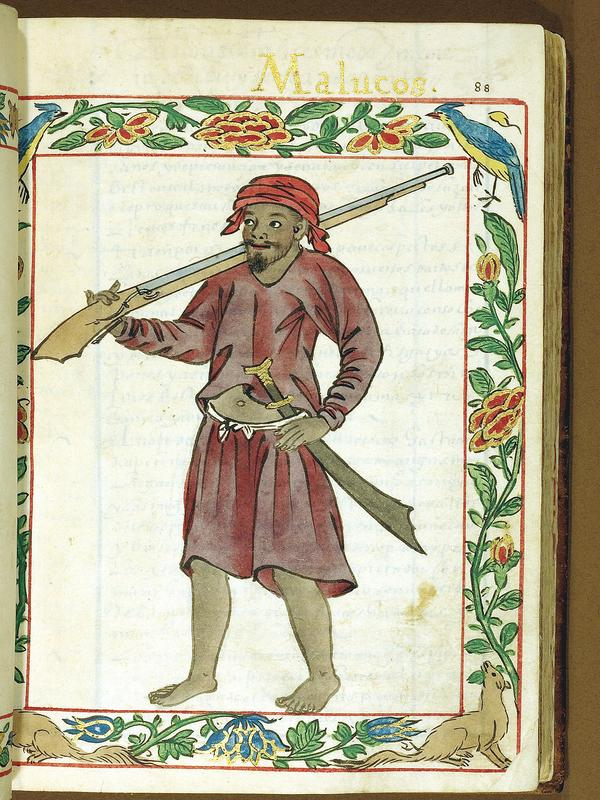
Moluccan warrior from the Moluccas (in modern-day Maluku Islands, Indonesia)

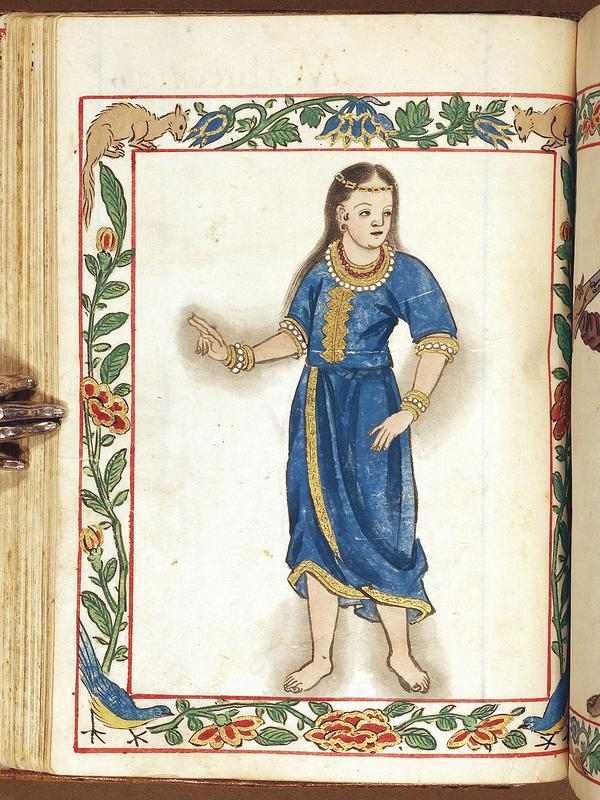
Moluccan noble woman

== See also ==
- Códice Casanatense
- Damián Domingo
- Fabián de la Rosa
- Fernando Amorsolo
- José Honorato Lozano
- Juan Luna
- Tipos del País
