= Pedro de Rojas =

8th Governor and Captain-General of the Philippines
- In office October – December 1593
- Monarch: Philip II of Spain
- Governor: (Viceroy of New Spain); Luis de Velasco, 1st Marquess of Salinas
- Preceded by: Gómez Pérez Dasmariñas
- Succeeded by: Luis Pérez Dasmariñas

Personal details
- Born: Cangas del Narcea, Asturias, Spain
- Died: 1600 New Spain

Pedro de Rojas was a Spanish licenciado (lawyer) and colonial official in the Philippines and New Spain. For 40 days in 1593 he served as interim governor of the Philippines.

He had first served in the Philippines as a member of the Audiencia of Manila, beginning in 1584. In 1590 he was made lieutenant assessor of the colony, an important position.

== Expedition to the Moluccas ==
In 1593, the governor Gómez Pérez Dasmariñas led a Spanish expedition from Manila to capture the fort at Terrenate, in the Moluccas. Gómez Pérez left the military affairs of Manila and the rest of the Philippines in charge of Diego Ronquillo, and civil affairs in charge of Pedro de Rojas, who was then lieutenant assessor.

On the second day after the governor had sailed from Manila, the fleet reached the island of Caca, 24 leagues from the capital and just off the coast of Luzon. There the Chinese rowers of the galley that was the governor's flagship seized the ship and killed most of the crew and passengers, including Governor Pérez Dasmariñas. They then sailed the ship away from the Philippines, hoping to reach China.

== Choice of a new governor ==
Governor Pérez Dasmariñas had brought with him to the Philippines a royal order directing him to choose a temporary successor to serve in the event of his death. He had shown this order to various prominent Spaniards in the colony, implying to each that he was the designated successor. In particular, both the governor's son Luis Pérez Dasmariñas and conquistador Captain Estevan Rodríguez de Figueroa expected the appointment. Both of these men had been on the expedition to the Moluccas with the governor. Both hurried back to Manila to take command of the colony.

Meanwhile, news of the seizure of the galley had arrived in Manila. The citizens and soldiers who had remained there assembled at the house of Licenciado Pedro de Rojas to discuss what to do. First they elected Rojas governor and captain general. Then they sent two frigates in pursuit of the galley, but they were unable to find it. Rojas also sent a message to Luis Pérez in Pintados, informing him of Rojas's election and ordering him to return immediately to Manila, as the city had been left nearly defenseless.

Rojas also began a search of the previous governor's papers to find the document naming his successor. The papers had been deposited in the Augustinian monastery in Manila, but the prior, not trusting Rojas, had secretly removed the document.

About 40 days after the election of Rojas, Luis Pérez and Estevan Rodríguez arrived together in the harbor, with many men. They did not disembark, and Pérez ordered another search for the missing document. This was now found, and it named Pérez as his father's successor. The city magistrates then withdrew recognition of Rojas, and turned over the government to Pérez. This was seconded by Pérez's soldiers, and by the fleet. Rojas left office, having governed for 40 days.

Rojas was soon replaced as lieutenant assessor, by Antonio de Morga, who had been sent from Spain. Rojas was promoted to the position of alcalde in Mexico City.

Political offices
Preceded by Gómez Pérez Dasmariñas	Governor and Captain-General of the Philippines; 1593	Succeeded by Luis Pérez Dasmariñas
