= Santiago de Vera =

Spanish colonial governor of the Philippines from 1584 to 1590

6th Governor-general of the Captaincy-General of the Philippines
- In office May 16, 1584 – May 1590
- Monarch: Philip II of Spain
- Governor: (Viceroy of New Spain); Luis de Villanueva y Zapata; Pedro Moya de Contreras; Álvaro Manrique de Zúñiga, 1st Marquess of Villamanrique; Luis de Velasco, 1st Marquess of Salinas
- Preceded by: Diego Ronquillo
- Succeeded by: Gómez Pérez Dasmariñas

Santiago de Vera was a native of Alcalá de Henares, Spain and the sixth Spanish governor of the Philippines, from May 16, 1584, until May 1590.

== Governorship ==
Governor Gonzalo Ronquillo de Peñalosa and Domingo de Salazar, the first bishop of Manila, had requested the King of Spain to establish the Supreme Court of the Philippines then called the Audiencia, to settle disputes between the Church and State. In 1584, three judges arrived from Mexico and started the justice court with De Vera serving as the chief justice.

After the sudden death of Governor Peñalosa, Diego Ronquillo, his nephew became the governor ad interim but was later charged for defalcation in the trust of Peñalosa's estate and was sent back to Spain as a prisoner. As the chief justice of the court, Santiago de Vera succeeded as the governor of the islands on May 16, 1584.

== First houses of stone ==
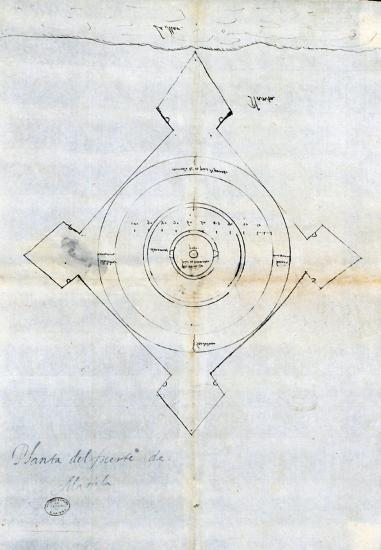
Ground plan of the Fort of Nuestra Señora de Guia built by Santiago de Vera in 1587

Following the great fire of Manila on March 19, 1583, which started during the wake of Governor Gonzalo Ronquillo de Peñalosa at the San Agustin Church, Santiago de Vera made an order that all construction in Manila should be of stone. It was found that stone could be easily cut near the banks of the Pasig in Guadalupe (now Guadalupe Viejo in Makati) and brought to Manila in boats.

== Fort of Nuestra Señora de Guia ==
He also built the first stone fort of Manila called Nuestra Señora de Guia (Our Lady of Guidance) in 1587 located at the present location of San Diego Bastion (Baluarte de San Diego) at the southwestern corner of Intramuros with plans by a Jesuit named Sedeño. The artillery for this fort was cast by Panday Pira.

De Vera also began to dig the moat which surrounded the city. He also built a stone breastwork along the Pasig riverfront. The great wall was not begun till the tenure of Gómez Pérez Dasmariñas.

Political offices
Preceded by Diego Ronquillo	Governor and Captain-General of the Philippines; 1584–1590	Succeeded by Gómez Pérez Dasmariñas
