= José de Acosta =

Spanish missionary and writer (d. 1600)

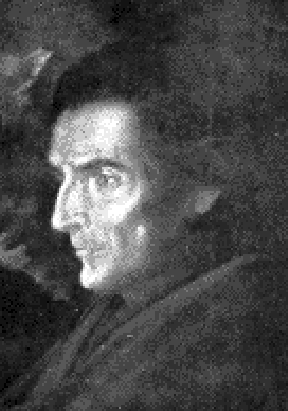
José de Acosta, member of the Society of Jesus, missionary and author

José de Acosta, SJ (1539 or 1540 in Medina del Campo, Spain – February 15, 1600 in Salamanca, Spain) was a sixteenth-century Spanish Jesuit missionary and naturalist in Latin America. He served many important theological and political positions in his lifetime, notably as the Jesuit's representative to Philip II. His deductions regarding the ill effects of crossing over the Andes in 1570 related to the atmosphere being too thin for human needs led to the modern understanding of a variety of altitude sickness, now referred to as Acosta's disease. He was also one of the first Europeans to discuss magnetic declination.

== Life ==
=== Early life ===
José de Acosta was born in 1539 to a merchant family in Medina del Campo in Spain, about twenty-four miles from Valladolid, in Old Castile, on the left bank of the swampy river Zapardiel, and overlooked by the old castle of La Mota. The Acosta brothers were fellow townsmen of the conquistador Bernal Diaz, who told the story of the Spanish conquest of Mexico. Acosta was of converso background. According to one scholar, he was "a heavy man of uncertain, melancholic temper." His parents had five sons, Gerónimo, Christóval, José, Diego, and Bernardo. Four of the five Acosta brothers joined the Society of Jesus. In 1553, at the age of thirteen, Acosta became a novice in the order at Medina del Campo. From 1559-1567, he studied philosophy at the university of Alcalá de Henares. He was ordained as a priest at the age of twenty-seven in Spain. He was a lecturer in theology at Ocana, and in April 1569, he was sent to Lima, Peru, where the Jesuits had been established in the proceeding year.

=== Panama ===
At age 32, Acosta left Spain with several other Jesuits in 1570, landing at Cartagena de Indias, and finally at Nombre de Dios. He then journeyed through 18 leagues - about 62 mi (100 km) - of tropical forest, taking in the scenery, novel sights, and the clever antics of troops of monkeys in Capira. From Panama, he embarked for Peru to pursue missionary work. He expected to experience unbearably intense heat in crossing the equator, but found it to be so cool in March, that he laughed at Aristotle and his philosophy.

=== Peru and Acosta's disease ===
On his arrival at Lima, he was ordered to cross the Andes, apparently to join the Viceroy of Peru in the interior. He took the route, with fourteen or fifteen companions, across the mountainous province of Huarochiri, and by the lofty pass of Pariacaca, which was over 14,000 ft (4,300 m), where the whole party suffered severely from the effects of rarefied atmosphere. Acosta described these sufferings, which were to be repeated on the three other occasions of crossing the cordillera.

Acosta arrived in Peru two years after Don Francisco de Toledo became Viceroy in 1568. Following Toledo's beheading of the Inca Túpac Amaru, the Viceroy devoted five years to tour every region of the Viceroyalty of Peru. He planned to settle in the country with the support of Acosta, the licentiate Polo de Ondegardo, and Judge Juan Ortiz de Matienzo. Acosta accompanied the Viceroy to Charcas and was present during his unsuccessful foray against the Chirihuana peoples.

At the time, the principal seat of the Jesuits was located in the little town of Juli near the western shores of Lake Titicaca. Acosta observed the comet of 1577, from November 1 to December 8. The Jesuits established a college in Juli, which included studies on native languages. Eventually, a printing press was established. Acosta remained at Juli and devoted much of his time preparing several manuscripts, which he later took back to Spain, including the first two books of the Natural History of the Indies. At Juli, Father Acosta received information respecting the Amazon River from a brother who had formerly been in the famous piratical cruise of Lope de Aguirre.

Towards the close of the viceroyalty of Toledo, Father Acosta appeared to have relocated from the interior of Peru to Lima. Here he mentions superintending the casting of a great bell, for which there was difficulty in gathering fuel for the furnace, making it necessary to fell great trees in the Rímac River's valley. Viceroy Toledo was practically the founder of the University of St. Mark at Lima, where Acosta was to occupy the chair of theology. Here he was again able to display his abilities as a famed orator.

In 1571, Acosta went to Cuzco as a visitor of the recently founded college of the Jesuits. He returned to Lima three years later to fill the chair of theology, and was elected provincial in 1576.

In 1579, the Viceroy dispatched a fleet under Pedro Sarmiento de Gamboa, partly to chase Sir Francis Drake on the coast, and partly to explore and survey the Strait of Magellan. Acosta had conversations with the pilot of Sarmiento's fleet, and was allowed to inspect his chart, thus obtaining much hydrographic information, and particulars respecting the tides in the straits. He also conversed with the new Viceroy Don Martín Henríquez on the same subject.

Acosta founded several colleges including Arequipa, Potosí, Chuquisaca, Panama and La Paz, even when met with considerable opposition from the Viceroy Toledo. His official duties obliged him to investigate personally an extensive range of territory, so that he acquired a practical knowledge of the vast province, and of its aboriginal inhabitants. At the 1582 session of the Third Council of Lima, Father Acosta took on the role of historian. He delivered an eloquent and learned oration at its last sitting on October 18, 1583.

=== Mexico ===
Shortly after the Third Council of Lima, he packed all his manuscripts, the literary labors of fifteen years, and commenced his voyage to Mexico. Acosta landed at the port of Huatulco, at the western end of the Gulf of Tehuantepec, in the Oaxaca province, then journeyed by land to Mexico City, where he resided in 1586. He had opportunities of which he diligently availed himself for collecting information touching the civilization and religion of the Aztecs and natural products of this country. His chief informant respecting the rites and festivals of the Mexicans was brother and Prebendary, Juan de Tobar. For information on the Mexica, Acosta followed Juan de Tovar's Relación del origen de los indios que habitan esta Nueva España según sus historias, a possible summary of Fray Diego Durán's Historia de las Indias de Nueva España e islas de Tierra Firme - in turn derived in part from an anonymous Nahuatl history of Mexico-Tenochtitlan, known as the Crónica X.

=== Return to Spain ===
Acosta had been called to Spain by the King in 1585, prior to being detained in Mexico, in order to debate against Alonzo Sánchez's plans to initiate an invasion of China. He sailed home to Spain in the fleet of 1587, which contained a precious cargo, including twelve chests of gold each weighing 100 lb (45 kg), 11,000,000 pieces of silver, and two chests of emeralds each also weighing 100 lb (45 kg), in addition to loads of ginger, sarsaparilla, Brazil wood and animal hides. In 1592, Acosta was appointed the position of representative to the Society of Jesus for Philip II, which he served for two years in Rome. During this time, his main task was dealing with the Fifth General Congregation of the Society of Jesus, which was called by Philip II in response to concerns by a group of Jesuits known as memorialistas. The memorialistas strongly opposed the leadership of Claudio Acquaviva, the superior general of the Society at the time. Acosta returned to Spain in 1594, and was appointed head of the Jesuits College at Valladolid, as well as other important positions. He spent his remaining years publishing the many drafts and manuscripts he had created during his time in the New World. At the time of his death in 1600 at age 60, he was rector of the college at Salamanca.

== Works ==
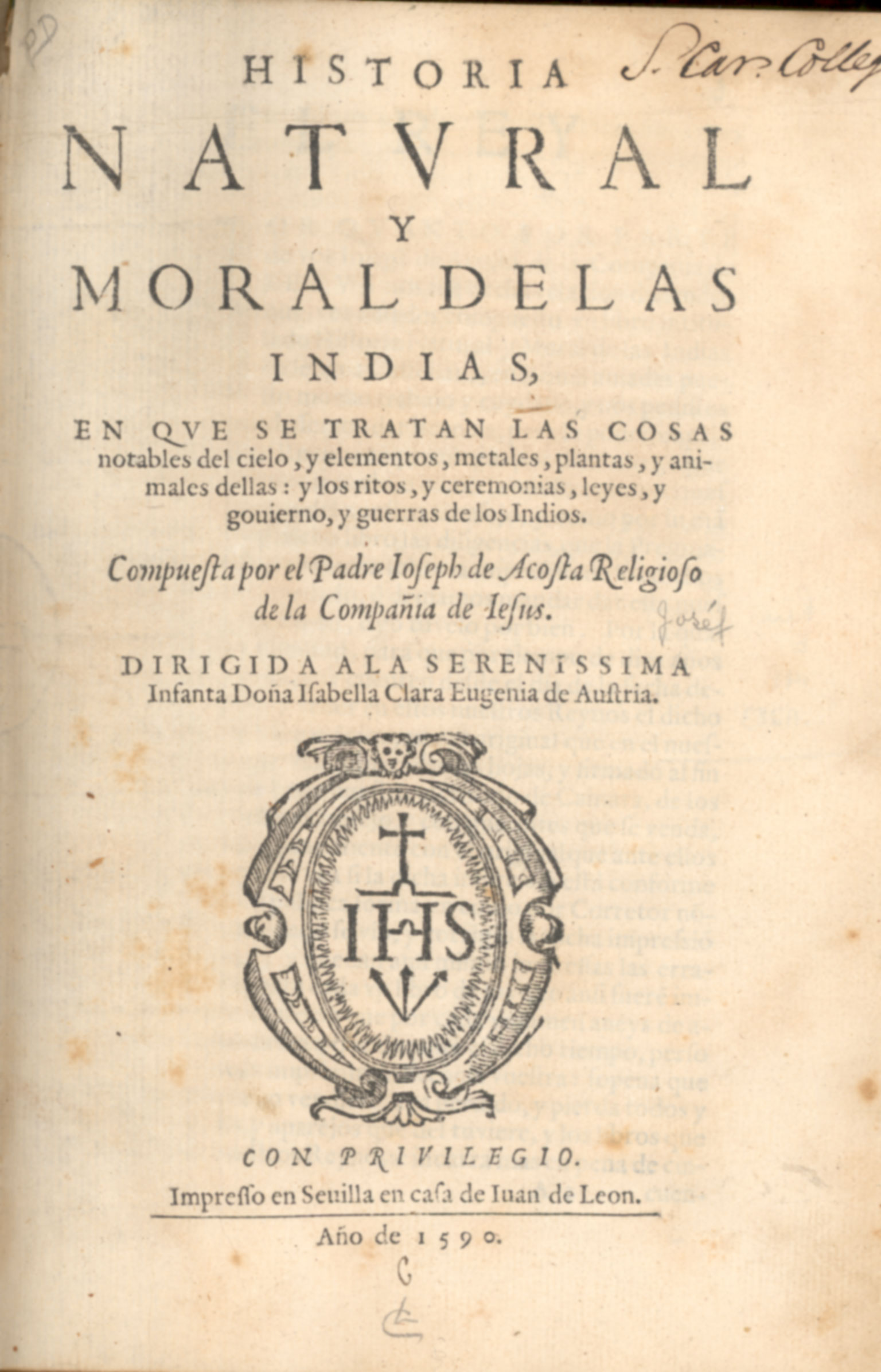
Title page of Historia natural y moral

Aside from his publication of the proceedings of the provincial councils of 1567 and 1583, and several works of exclusively theological import, Acosta is best known as the writer of the Historia natural y moral de las Indias (1590), as well as De promulgatione Evangelii apud Barbaros, sive De Procuranda Indorum salute (1588), Doctrina Cristiana y Catecismo Para Indios (1585) and De Natura Novi Orbis.

The Historia natural y moral proved to be Acosta's most popular work by far, and was first translated to English in London in 1604. It is chiefly the Historia natural y moral that has established the reputation of Acosta, as this was one of the first detailed and realistic descriptions of the New World. In a form more concise than that employed by his predecessors, Francisco Lopez de Gómara and Oviedo, he treated the natural and philosophic history of the New World from a broader point of view. In it, more than a century before other Europeans learned of the Bering Strait, Acosta hypothesized that Latin America's indigenous peoples had migrated from Asia. He also divided them into three categories of government: monarchy, communal self government, and "barbarous" nomads. The Historia also described Inca and Aztec customs and history, as well as other information such as winds and tides, lakes, rivers, plants, animals, and mineral resources in the New World. Acosta frequently supported his observations and credibility by citing other men with a wealth of experience in various fields. His firsthand observations were the basis for much of his writings, mirroring predecessors such as Christopher Columbus and Hernán Cortés. He was one of the first Europeans to recognize the existence of New World phenomena, namely that they should be understood according to their own characteristics rather than through European frameworks.

== Scientific Contributions ==
Acosta is regarded as an important contributor to many fields, including environmental medicine, physical geography, geomagnetism, biogeography, and climatology.

During his time in Peru, Acosta provided one of the earliest detailed accounts of altitude sickness, "air... so thin and so delicate that it is not proportioned to human breathing". A variety of altitude sickness is referred to as Acosta's disease. He also described an attack of snow blindness and being subsequently cured by an indigenous woman.

Acosta was among the first European explorers to discuss magnetic declination and the concept of Earth's four magnetic poles. During his voyage to Mexico, he learned from an expert Portuguese pilot that there were four often-visited ports of no magnetic compass variation on the Earth, and that one of them was Corvo Island in the Azores. In Historia natural, he contemplated in depth on both the properties of lodestones and their variance at different points on the Earth.

== See also ==
- Viceroyalty of Peru
- List of Jesuit scientists
- List of Roman Catholic scientist-clerics
- List of Spanish chroniclers of the Indies

== Bibliography ==
- Acosta, José de (2002). The Natural and Moral History of the Indies. Edited by Jane Mangan; translated by Frances Lopez-Morillas. Durham, NC: Duke University Press. ISBN 978-0-8223-2845-2
- BEROSE - International Encyclopaedia of the Histories of Anthropology. "Acosta, José de (1540-1600)", Paris, 2019. (ISSN 2648-2770)
- Burgaleta, Claudio M. (1999). José de Acosta (1540–1600): His Life and Thought. Chicago: Loyola University Press. ISBN 978-0-8294-1063-1.
- Gilbert, D. L. (June 1983). "The first documented description of mountain sickness: the Andean or Pariacaca story". Respiration Physiology. 52 (3): 327–347. doi:10.1016/0034-5687(83)90089-0. ISSN 0034-5687. PMID 6351210.
- Howgego, Raymond John, ed. (2003). "Acosta, José de". Encyclopedia of Exploration to 1800. Hordern House. ISBN 1875567364.
- Kish, George (1970). "Acosta, José de". Dictionary of Scientific Biography. New York: Scribner.
- MacCormack, Sabine (1991). Religion in the Andes: Vision and Imagination in Early Colonial Peru. Princeton, NJ: Princeton University Press. ISBN 978-0-691-09468-7.
- Pagden, Anthony (1982). The Fall of Natural Man: The American Indian and the Origins of Comparative Ethnology. New York: Cambridge University Press. ISBN 978-0-521-33704-5.
- Pagden, Anthony (1993). European Encounters with the New World: From Renaissance to Romanticism. New Haven, CT: Yale University Press. ISBN 978-0-300-05285-5.
- Pino Díaz, Fermín del (2019). “Contribución del Padre José de Acosta a la constitución de la etnología: su evolucionismo”, in BEROSE - International Encyclopaedia of the Histories of Anthropology, Paris.
- Pino Díaz, Fermín del (2019). “Vida y obra de José de Acosta, misionero jesuita y cronista indiano”, in BEROSE - International Encyclopaedia of the Histories of Anthropology, Paris.
