= Diego López (painter) =

Spanish painter

- Born: 1465
- Died: 1530 (aged 64–65)
- Known for: Painting the Cathedral of Toledo

Diego López (c. 1465 – c. 1530) was a Spanish painter. He was born at Toledo and there studied under Antonio del Rincón. From 1495 to 1508 he helped decorate the Cathedral of Toledo, and in 1519, in company with Alonzo Sanchez, he decorated the theatre of the University of Alcalá de Henares. His works of art include a variety of different art styles.
