= Panday Pira =

Filipino blacksmith (died 1576)

Panday Pira (Kapampángan: Pandeng Pira; c. 1488–1576) was a Filipino kapampángan blacksmith His name's literal translation is "Blacksmith Pira", panday being the Tagalog word for "blacksmith".

Panday Pira was a native of the southern islands of the Philippines. He migrated to Manila in 1508 and established a foundry on the northern bank of the Pasig River. Rajah Sulayman commissioned Panday Pira to cast the cannon that were mounted on the palisades surrounding his kingdom. In 1570, Castilian forces under the command of Martin de Goiti captured Manila and took these artillery pieces as war booty, presenting them to Miguel López de Legazpi, the first Spanish Governor-General of the Philippines.

Legazpi eventually established a permanent Castilian settlement in Manila on May 19, 1571, and on June 3 of the same year, Tarik Sulayman waged the Battle of Bangkusay Channel to recapture his kingdom from the Spaniards. Sulayman failed in this and perished in the battle. Panday Pira then fled to Pampanga where he attempted to begin a new life in sitio Capalangan in the town of Apalit, working as a blacksmith forging farm implements. He was, however, summoned by Legazpi back to Manila and put to work forging cannons for the Spaniards. He established his foundry in what is now Santa Ana. Santiago de Vera, the sixth Governor-General, commissioned him to cast cannon for the defenses of a fortress he built, the fortress of Nuestra Señora de Guía (Spanish, "Our Lady of Guidance"), now called Intramuros. To the Spaniards, Panday Pira was known as Pandapira, and they exempted him from paying tribute and forced labor.

In 1576, Panday Pira died at the age of 88. His death was a great loss to the Spaniards who had to petition the King of Spain for a blacksmith to take his place. It was not until 1584, that a Spanish blacksmith from Mexico arrived.

== See also ==
- History of the Philippines
