= 1593 transported soldier legend =

Imperial Spanish folktale

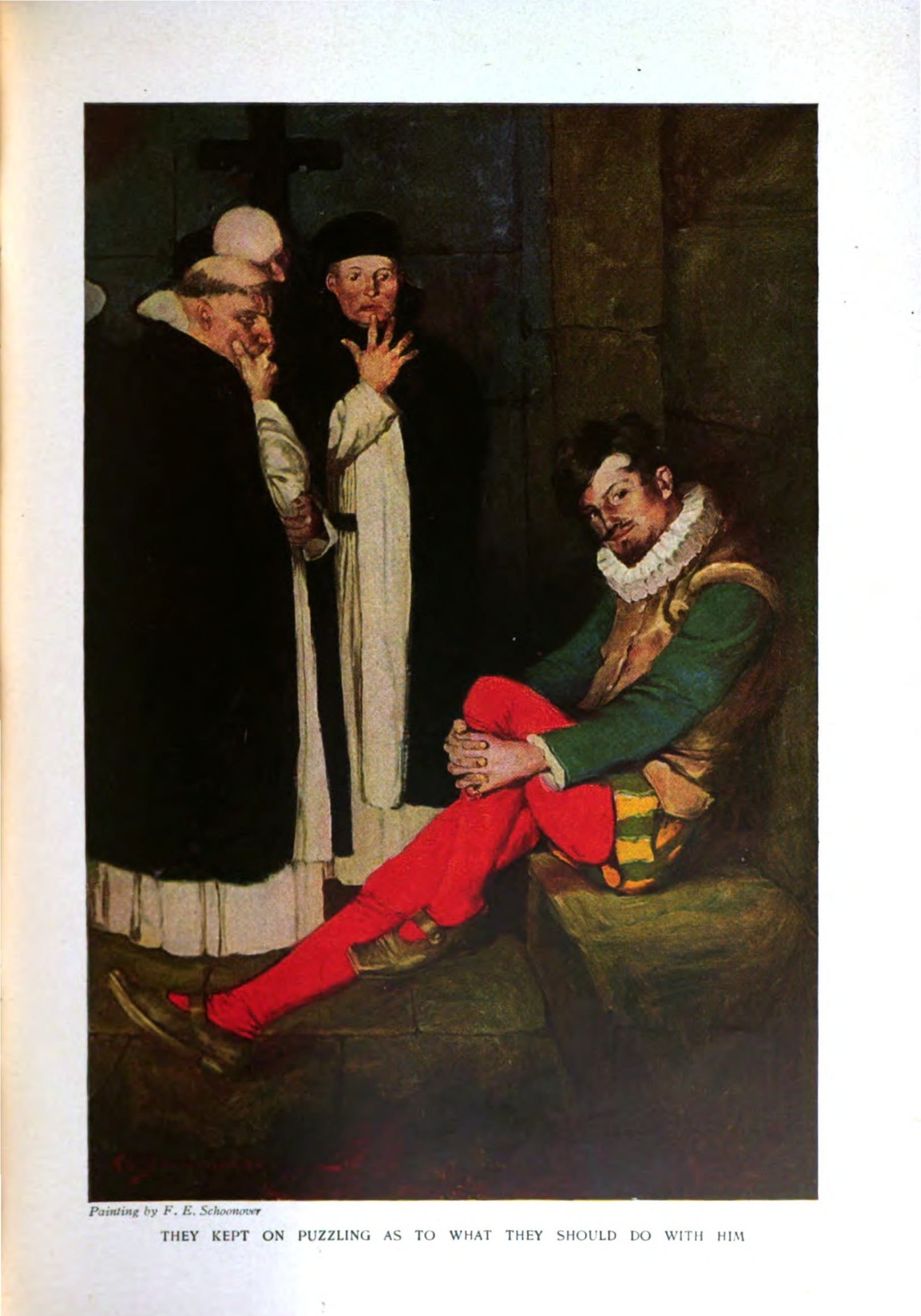
1908 illustration: the soldier from Manila watched by the Inquisition in Mexico City

A folk legend holds in October 1593, a soldier of the Spanish Empire (named Gil Pérez in a 1908 version) was mysteriously transported from Manila in the Philippines to the Plaza Mayor (now the Zócalo) in Mexico City. The soldier's claim to have come from the Philippines was disbelieved by the Mexicans until his account of the assassination of Gómez Pérez Dasmariñas was corroborated months later by the passengers of a ship which had crossed the Pacific Ocean with the news. In 1908, folklorist Thomas Allibone Janvier described the legend as "current among all classes of the population of the City of Mexico." Twentieth-century paranormal investigators giving credence to the story have offered teleportation and alien abduction as explanations.

== Story ==
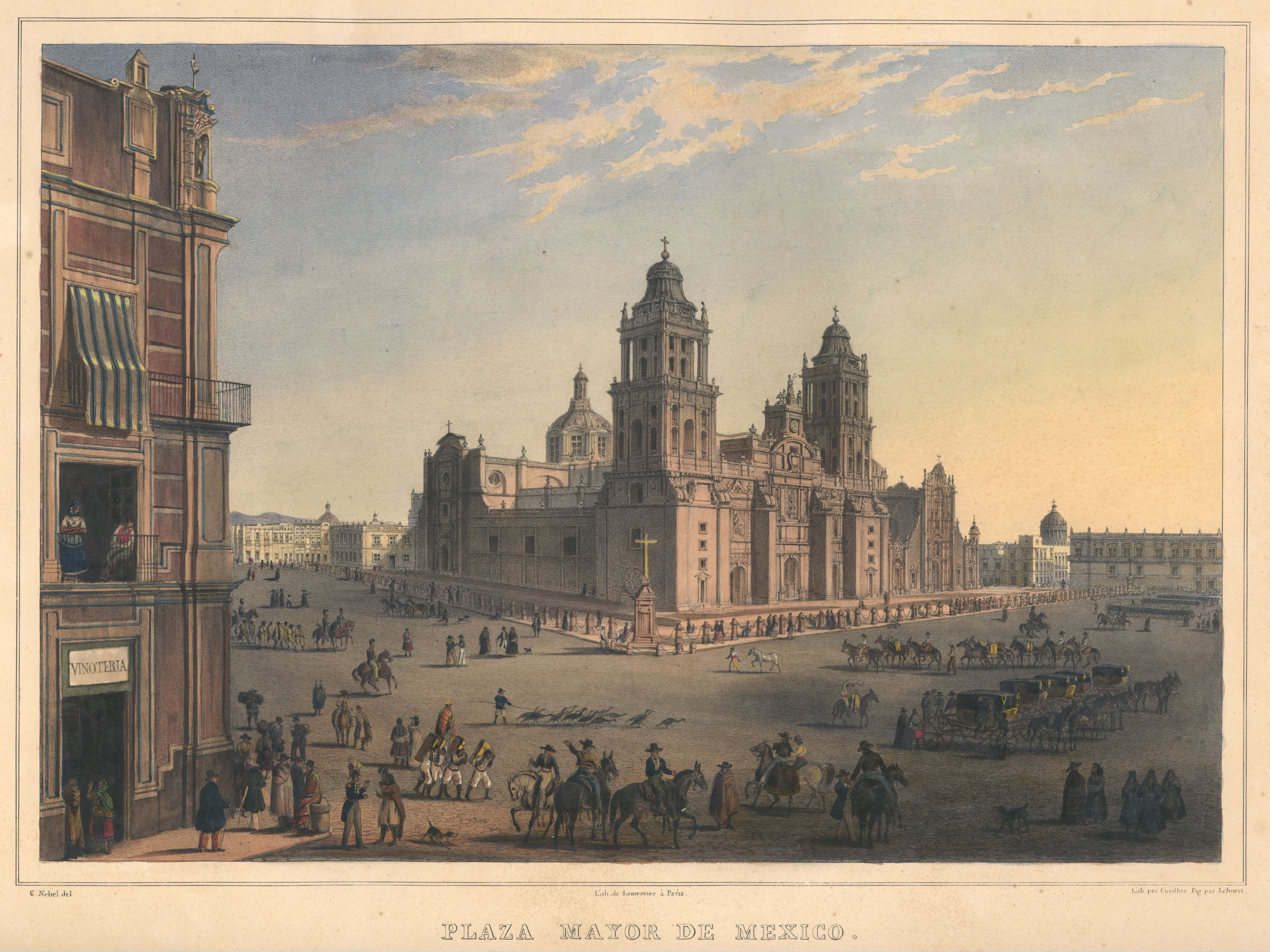
The Plaza Mayor, where the soldier allegedly appeared in 1593, pictured in 1836.

On 24 October 1593, the soldier was guarding the Palacio del Gobernador in Manila in the Captaincy General of the Philippines. The night before, Governor Gómez Pérez Dasmariñas was assassinated by Chinese pirates, but the guards still guarded the palace and awaited the appointment of a new governor. The soldier began to feel dizzy and exhausted. He leaned against the wall and rested for a moment with his eyes closed.

When he opened his eyes a few seconds later, he found himself in Mexico City, in the heart of the Viceroyalty of New Spain, thousands of kilometres across the ocean. Some guards found him in the wrong uniform and began to question who he was. The news of the assassination of the Governor of the Philippines was still unknown to the people in Mexico City. The transported soldier was reportedly wearing the palace guards' uniform in Manila and knew of his death. (In fact, Pérez Dasmariñas was killed at sea some distance from Manila.)

The authorities placed him in jail for being a deserter and with charges of being a servant of the devil. Months later, news of the governor's death came to Mexico on a galleon from the Philippines. One of the passengers recognized the imprisoned soldier and said that he had seen him in the Philippines a day after the death of the Governor. He was eventually released from jail by the authorities and allowed to go back home.

== Development ==
Thomas Allibone Janvier, an American folklorist living in Mexico, recounted the story as Legend of the Living Spectre in the December 1908 edition of Harper's Magazine, naming the soldier as Gil Pérez. The story was one of a series entitled Legends of the City of Mexico published in a collected volume in 1910. Janvier notes that similar motifs are common in folklore. Washington Irving's 1832 book Tales of the Alhambra includes the story "Governor Manco and the Soldier", which bears similarities to the legend.

Janvier's 1908 account was based on a Spanish version by Mexican folklorist Luis González Obregón, published in 1894 under the title "Un aparecido" ("An apparition") in his series México viejo: noticias históricas, tradiciones, leyendas y costumbres ("Old Mexico: historical notes, folklore, legends and customs"). Obregón traces the story to a 1698 account by Fray Gaspar de San Agustín of the Spanish conquest of the Philippines, which recounts the story as fact; San Agustin does not name the soldier and ascribed his transportation to witchcraft.

Janvier says Obregón asserts that in 1609, Antonio de Morga had written that Pérez Dasmariñas' death was known in Mexico the same day, though de Morga expresses ignorance of how this came to be. José Rizal notes many other miraculous stories from the Spanish Philippines of the time; Luis Weckmann makes the same point in relation to Spanish Mexico. A 1936 collection, Historias de vivos y muertos ("Stories of the living and the dead") by Obregón's successor Artemio de Valle Arizpe, included a version of the story entitled "Por el aire vino, por la mar se fue" ("He came by air, he left by sea").

Several writers have offered paranormal explanations for the story. Morris K. Jessup and Brinsley Trench, 8th Earl of Clancarty, suggested alien abduction, while Colin Wilson and Gary Blackwood suggested teleportation.

== See also ==
- Time travel claims and urban legends
