= Gómez Pérez Dasmariñas =

Spanish diplomat and governor (1590–1593)

7th Governor and Captain-General of the Philippines
- In office June 1, 1590 – October 25, 1593
- Monarch: Philip II of Spain
- Governor: (Viceroy of New Spain); Luis de Velasco, 1st Marquess of Salinas
- Preceded by: Santiago de Vera
- Succeeded by: Pedro de Rojas

Personal details
- Born: January 1, 1519 Betanzos, Galicia, Crown of Castile
- Died: October 25, 1593 (aged 74) Caca, Batangas, Captaincy General of the Philippines (present-day Tingloy, Batangas, Philippines)
- Citizenship: Spanish

Gómez Pérez Dasmariñas (1 January 1519 – 25 October 1593) was a Spanish politician, diplomat, military officer and imperial official. He was the seventh Governor-General of the Philippines from May or June 1, 1590 to October 25, 1593. Dasmariñas was a member of the Order of Santiago.

== Background ==
Pérez Dasmariñas was born in Betanzos, Galicia, Spain. He was named governor of León on January 30, 1579. There he built the meat market and various fountains and streets. His work there was viewed favorably, and he was promoted to corregidor of Murcia, Lorca and Cartagena, Spain on September 27, 1584. He held these positions until January 1, 1587. In 1589 he was named governor and captain general of the Philippines by King Philip II. At the same time, Philip increased the salary of the position to 10,000 Castilian ducados per year and made Pérez Dasmariñas a knight of the Order of Santiago.

His orders included the suppression of the Audiencia of Manila, something that had been requested by the Spanish settlers in the Philippines. He also had instructions to establish a garrison of 400 soldiers, paid at His Majesty's expense, for the defense of the colony.

Pérez Dasmariñas sailed for New Spain (Mexico) on December 8, 1589, on the same ships as Luis de Velasco (hijo), the newly appointed viceroy of New Spain. Continuing his journey, Pérez Dasmariñas left from Acapulco on March 1, 1590 and arrived in Manila in May, or, according to his own account, on June 1.

== As governor ==
Upon taking office, he quickly suppressed the Audiencia and established the garrison. He pushed the project to build a stone defensive wall around the city of Manila, so that it was nearly completed by the time of his death in 1593. He rebuilt Fort Santiago, and also had the cathedral of Manila constructed in stone, and encouraged private citizens to build their dwellings in stone.

During his term of office he increased trade with China and improved communication with Spain. He built some galleys for the defense of the coast and suppressed an uprising in Zambales. He sent his son Luis Pérez Dasmariñas at the head of a military expedition to Cagayan, across parts of the island of Luzon never before seen by Spaniards. He also built an artillery foundry in Manila, but because of a lack of skilled founders, this project was not very successful.

In the first year of his administration, he sent the president and the oidores (judges) of the suppressed Audiencia to Spain. However Licenciado Pedro de Rojas, the senior oidor, remained in Manila by order of the king as lieutenant-assessor in matters of justice, until some years later he was appointed alcalde in Mexico City.

Also during his administration (1592), a letter was received from Toyotomi Hideyoshi, the ruler of Japan at that time, demanding submission and tribute and threatening to come with a fleet and troops to lay waste the country. The correspondence dragged out for several years, until finally Hideyoshi died.

As a continuing confirmation of Pre-hispanic Lucoes' service as mercenaries in Southeast Asia, in 1593 the king of Cambodia sent an embassy to the governor, namely the Portuguese Diego Belloso. Belloso brought a present of two elephants and offers of friendship and trade. He also implored aid against Siam, which was threatening the kingdom. Pérez Dasmariñas sent the king a present of a horse and some emeralds and other objects, but postponed a reply to the request for aid. This was the origin of the later Spanish involvement and expeditions to the kingdoms of Siam and Cambodia.

On May 12, 1591, Esteban Rodríguez de Figueroa, a wealthy Spaniard of Manila, made an agreement with the governor to conquer Muslim Mindanao. This was to be done at Rodríguez's own expense, in exchange for which he would name the governor of the conquered territory for two lifetimes.

Pérez Dasmariñas quarreled with Bishop Salazar, who departed for Spain in 1592.

== Expedition to the Moluccas ==
In 1593, Gómez Pérez Dasmariñas organized an expedition from Manila to capture the fort at Terrenate, in the Moluccas. (Two previous Spanish expeditions, in 1582 and 1584, had failed.) Pérez Dasmariñas had planned this expedition for some time, but in secret, and did not reveal his intention until most of the preparations had been made. He intended to lead the expedition personally. Before he set sail, he sent his son, Luis Pérez Dasmariñas, on ahead with part of the fleet to the province of Pintado.

The governor left the military affairs of Manila and the rest of the Philippines in charge of Diego Ronquillo, and the civil affairs in charge of Pedro de Rojas. After his son left, he remained briefly in Manila, making final preparations and arming a galley (La Capitana) of 28 benches, in which he was to sail. This galley he manned with good Chinese rowers, with pay. According to Antonio de Morga, in order to win the good will of the rowers, he would not allow them to be chained, and even winked at their carrying certain weapons.

About forty Spaniards embarked on the galley, and the galley itself was accompanied by a few frigates and smaller vessels, in which private individuals also embarked. The entire fleet consisted of 200 sails, counting galleys, galliots, frigates, vireys and other craft. More than 900 Spaniards were on the expedition.

The governor set sail from Cavite for Pintados in October 1593, to join the part of the fleet under Luis Pérez already at Pintados. They were then to proceed to the Moluccas.

== Mutiny and death of the governor ==
On the second day of this first leg of the expedition, the governor's fleet reached the island of Caca, 24 leagues from Manila and just off the coast of Luzon. They found it difficult to round the headland known as Punta del Azufre because of a strong head wind. The governor ordered the ships to anchor there for the night, and attempt to round the point the next day. The Chinese rowers had been plotting for three days to seize the galley, and this night gave them an opportunity.

In the last watch before dawn, they attacked the guards and the sleeping Spaniards, killing most of them, although a few escaped by swimming or in the galley's tender. Upon hearing the commotion, Governor Dasmariñas, thinking that the galley was dragging and the men were taking to the oars, carelessly left his cabin bareheaded. He was killed by several Chinese waiting outside the door. Two Spaniards, Juan de Cuellar, the governor's secretary, and Franciscan Father Montilla, survived by remaining in their cabin amidships. They were later released ashore by the rebels.

The rebels then made for China in the captured galley, but were unable to arrive there. Instead they reached Cochin China, where the king confiscated the two cannons aboard and all the items of value (jewels, money, etc.). The rebels were dispersed to different places and the galley was abandoned. A few of the rebels were later captured in Malacca and sent back to Manila, where "justice was dealt them."

== The choice of a new governor ==
The colony was now without a governor. Pérez Dasmariñas had brought with him to the Philippines a royal order directing him to choose a temporary successor in the event of his own death. He had shown this order to various prominent Spaniards in the colony, implying to each that he was the designated successor. In particular, both the governor's son and conquistador Captain Estevan Rodríguez de Figueroa expected the appointment. Both were on the expedition to the Moluccas, and both hurried back to Manila to take command of the colony.

Meanwhile, the citizens and soldiers in Manila elected Licenciado Pedro de Rojas governor and captain general. But with the return of Luis Pérez Dasmariñas, the previous governor's instructions were found, and his son became the new governor.

== See also ==
- 1593 transported soldier legend

== Notes ==
Political offices
Preceded by Santiago de Vera	Governor and Captain-General of the Philippines; 1590–1593	Succeeded by Pedro de Rojas
