= Luis Pérez Dasmariñas =

Spanish colonial administrator

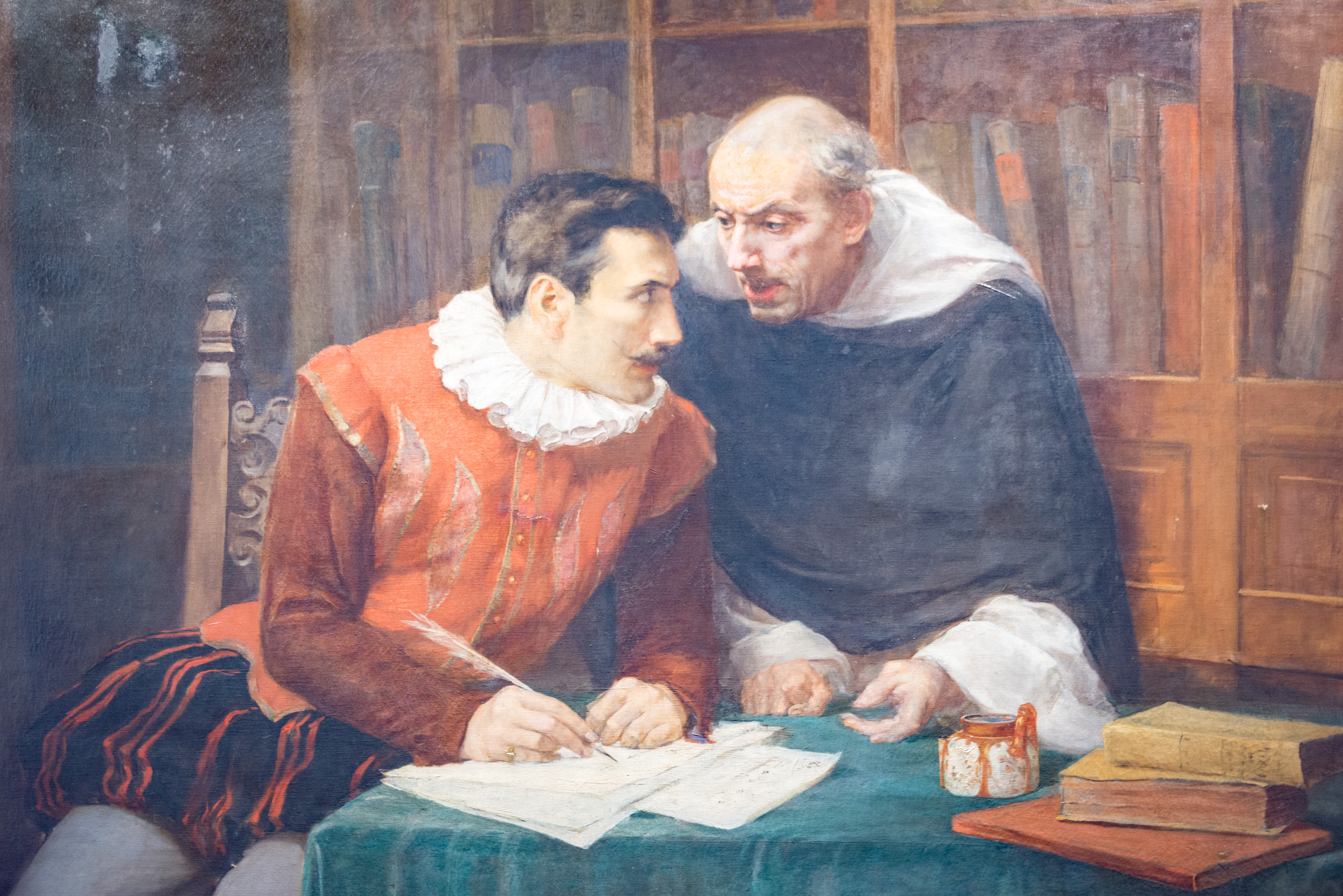

9th Governor-General of the Philippines
- In office December 3, 1593 – July 14, 1596
- Monarch: Philip II of Spain
- Governor: (Viceroy of New Spain); Luis de Velasco, 1st Marquess of Salinas; Gaspar de Zúñiga, 5th Count of Monterrey
- Preceded by: Pedro de Rojas
- Succeeded by: Francisco de Tello de Guzmán

Personal details
- Born: c. 1567 Vivero, Lugo, Spanish Empire
- Died: 7 December 1603 (aged 35–36) Philippines
- Citizenship: Spanish
- Parent: Gómez Pérez das Mariñas (father)

Luis Pérez Dasmariñas y Páez de Sotomayor was a Spanish soldier and governor of the Philippines from December 3, 1593 to July 14, 1596. In 1596, he sent unsuccessful expeditions to conquer Cambodia and Mindanao.

Pérez Dasmariñas was a knight of the Order of Alcántara. His father, Gómez Pérez Dasmariñas, was governor of the Philippines from 1590 to 1593.

== Expedition to the Moluccas ==
In 1593, Gómez Pérez Dasmariñas (the father) led a Spanish expedition from Manila to capture the fort at Terrenate, in the Moluccas. He had planned this expedition for some time, but in secret, and did not reveal his intention until most of the preparations had been made. He intended to lead the expedition personally. Before he set sail, he sent his son, Luis Pérez Dasmariñas, on ahead with part of the fleet to the province of Pintado. Luis Pérez was second in command of the expedition, with the title of captain general.

Gómez Pérez left the military affairs of Manila and the rest of the Philippines in charge of Diego Ronquillo, and civil affairs in charge of Pedro de Rojas. After his son left, he remained briefly in Manila, making final preparations and arming a galley of 28 benches, in which he was to sail. This galley he manned with good Chinese rowers, with pay. According to Antonio de Morga, in order to win the good will of the rowers, he would not allow them to be chained, and even winked at their carrying certain weapons.

About forty Spanish embarked on the galley, and the galley itself was accompanied by a few frigates and smaller vessels, in which private individuals embarked. The entire fleet consisted of 200 sail, counting galleys, galliots, frigates, virays and other craft. More than 900 Spanish were on the expedition.

The governor set sail from Cavite for Pintados in October 1593, to join the part of the fleet under Luis Pérez already at Pintados. They were then to proceed to the Moluccas.

== Mutiny and death of the governor ==
On the second day of this first leg of the expedition, the governor's fleet reached the island of Caca, 24 leagues from Manila and just off the coast of Luzon. The Chinese rowers had been plotting for three days to seize the galley, and this night was their opportunity.

In the last watch before dawn, they attacked the guards and the sleeping Spaniards, killing most of them, although a few escaped by swimming or in the galley's tender. Upon hearing the commotion, Governor Dasmariñas left his cabin, and was killed by several Chinese waiting outside the door. Two Spaniards, Juan de Cuellar, the governor's secretary, and Franciscan Father Montilla, survived by remaining in their cabin amidships. They were later released ashore by the rebels.

The rebels then made for China, but were unable to arrive there. Instead they reached Cochin China, where the king confiscated the two cannons aboard, the Royal Banner, and all the items of value (jewels, money, etc.). The rebels were dispersed to different places and the galley was abandoned. A few of the rebels were later captured in Malacca and sent back to Manila, where "justice was dealt them."

== The choice of a new governor ==
Governor Gómez Pérez had brought with him to the Philippines a royal order directing him to choose a temporary successor in the event of his death. He had shown this order to various prominent Spaniards in the colony, implying to each that he was the designated successor. In particular, both the governor's son and conquistador Captain Estevan Rodríguez de Figueroa expected the appointment. Rodríguez was with the governor on the expedition to the Moluccas. Both he and Luis Pérez hurried back to Manila to take command of the colony.

Meanwhile, news of the seizure of the galley had arrived in Manila. The citizens and soldiers who had remained there assembled at the house of Licentiate Pedro de Rojas to discuss what to do. First they elected Rojas governor and captain general. Then they sent two frigates in pursuit of the galley, but they were unable to find it. Rojas also sent a message to Luis Pérez in Pintados, informing him of Rojas's election and ordering him to return immediately to Manila, as the city had been left nearly defenseless.

Rojas also began a search of the governor's papers to find the document naming his successor. The papers had been deposited in the Augustinian monastery in Manila, but the prior, not trusting Rojas, had secretly removed the document.

About 40 days after the election of Rojas, Luis Pérez and Estevan Rodríguez arrived together in the harbor, with many men. They did not disembark, and Pérez ordered another search for the missing document. This was now found, and it named Pérez as his father's successor. The city magistrates then withdrew recognition of Rojas, and turned over the government to Pérez. This was seconded by Pérez's soldiers, and by the fleet. Rojas left office, having governed for 40 days.

Pedro de Rojas was promoted to alcalde in Mexico City, and Antonio de Morga was named as his replacement in the Philippines, with increased authority. (Rojas had been lieutenant assessor in judicial matters, but Morga was also lieutenant governor of the colony.) Morga sailed from Acapulco, New Spain on March 22, 1595, arriving at Cavite on June 11 of the same year.

== Arrival of the Chinese Mandarins ==
Not many days after the return of the fleet, there arrived in Manila many Chinese ships, ostensibly for trade. However, they carried many men and little merchandise, with seven Mandarins bearing the insignia of their office. This led to the suspicion on the part of the Spaniards that the Chinese had heard of the departure of most of the Spanish forces for the Moluccas, and had sent a fleet to try to conquer the nearly defenseless islands.

However, seeing the city as strongly defended as ever, the Chinese made no hostile moves. They returned to China without showing any particular motive for the journey, and without either side mentioning the apparent motive.

== Expedition to Cambodia ==
In 1594 news was received in Manila that the king of Siam had invaded and conquered Cambodia. King Langara of Cambodia had been forced to flee to Laos. Pérez Dasmariñas was persuaded by Spanish and Portuguese who had been in Cambodia that the kingdom could be easily reconquered, and doing so would gain the Spanish a foothold on the mainland of Asia.

The governor ordered the dispatch of one vessel of moderate size and two junks, with 120 Spaniards and some Japanese and Filipinos. This expedition sailed at the beginning of 1596.

The flagship became separated from the two junks. The junks arrived in Cambodia only to find that the Cambodians had already driven out the Siamese. One of the anti-Siamese leaders, Anacaparan, had declared himself king. The Spanish decided this was a favorable opportunity, but they would await the arrival of their flagship before taking action. Nevertheless, an altercation occurred with Chinese traders in port, and the Spanish took up arms against them, killing some. This led to a confrontation with the new king, whom the Spaniards also defeated, burning much of his capital in the process.

At about this time in 1597, the flagship of the expedition finally arrived in Cambodia. The commander refused the entreaties of his subordinates to restore King Langara to the throne, and sailed for the Philippines.

In 1599, Malay Muslim merchants defeated and massacred almost the entire contingent of Spanish troops in Cambodia, putting an end to the Spanish plans to conquer it in the Cambodian–Spanish War.

== Expedition to Mindanao ==
Captain Estevan Rodríguez de Figueroa had made an agreement with Governor Gómez Pérez Dasmariñas to conquer the island of Mindanao at his own expense, for the right to rule it for two lifetimes. This agreement was confirmed in Spain and an order sent to go ahead. In February 1596, Rodríguez set out with 214 Spaniards and many Filipinos in some galleys, galleots, frigates, virays, barangays and lapis to begin his conquest. He soon reached the Mindanao River, where he was joined by the men of two native settlements, Tancapan and Lumaguan. He now commanded about 6,000 men.

The combined force now proceeded to Buhahayen, principal town of the island and the capital of the most important chief. Buhahayen was well fortified. Shortly after their arrival the Spanish were involved in a skirmish with the natives. Rodríguez was still aboard his flagship, but seeing that the Spanish were faring badly, he left the ship with a few men to take command. In order to travel more quickly, he was not wearing his helmet. Before he reached the scene of the skirmish, a single native surprised him, giving him a blow on the head with a sword.

Rodríguez was taken back to the ship, where he died the next day. Thus ended the first lifetime of his rule of Mindanao. The Spanish, with Juan de la Xara now in charge, retreated to the more friendly Tancapan, where they built a fort and a Spanish settlement named Murcia.

== After serving as governor ==
Luis Pérez Dasmarinas was still awaiting word of the expeditions to Cambodia and Mindanao when news was received that the new governor, Francisco de Tello de Guzmán, was arriving. Tello de Guzmán had been sent from Spain. He took over the government on July 14, 1596.

Luis Pérez made one expedition to Cambodia in person after his term as governor ended, but his ship was blown off course by a storm and he ended up in El Piñal on the Chinese coast. He drew the ire from Portuguese Macau nearby and was attacked by the Portuguese. Aborting the expedition to Cambodia, he returned to Manila. He was killed by Chinese rebels in the Sangley rebellion in 1603, who mounted the Spanish heads they chopped off throughout Manila.

== Notes ==
Political offices
Preceded by Pedro de Rojas	Governor and Captain-General of the Philippines; 1593–1596	Succeeded by Francisco de Tello de Guzmán
