= Gonzalo Ronquillo de Peñalosa =

Don Gonzalo Ronquillo de Peñalosa

4th Governor and Captain-General of the Philippines
- In office April 1580 – 10 March 1583
- Monarch: Philip II of Spain
- Governor: (Viceroy of New Spain); Martín Enríquez de Almanza; Lorenzo Suárez de Mendoza, 5th Count of Coruña
- Preceded by: Francisco de Sande
- Succeeded by: Diego Ronquillo

Personal details
- Born: Arévalo, Spain
- Died: 10 March 1583 Manila, Captaincy General of the Philippines
- Parents: Pedro de Mercado y Peñalosa (father); Catalina Briceño Ronquillo (mother)

Gonzalo Ronquillo de Peñalosa (died 10 March 1583), sometimes spelled as Gonçalo Ronquillo Peñaloza, was the fourth Spanish governor and captain-general of the Philippines from April 1580 until his death in 1583. He was succeeded by his nephew, Diego Ronquillo. Before arriving in the Philippines he served as royal court marshal in Mexico.

== Governorship ==
His first official action was to order Manila to become Philippines's political and economic capital in 1582. That same year, he established the Palacio del Gobernador (Governor's Palace) in Intramuros, Manila to integrate all governmental activities in the Philippines.

On 30 March 1582 he issued a decree stating that no person may leave the country without his permission. Ronquillo de Peñalosa, according to the content of his order, was informed that some Franciscan priests headed by Fray Pedro de Alfaro left the country in 1579 heading for mainland China. Around March 1582, as he continues, Franciscan Fray Pablo de Jesus and other missionaries re-entered China where they disseminate scandalous talks about the colony.

In June 1582, the first bishop of Manila Domingo de Salazar arrived at the Philippines. That same month, Jesuit missionaries successfully entered the Islands. Ronquillo de Peñalosa also reported that they successfully conquered and annexed the last of Moluccan Islands—the Tidore. He also reported to the King that the other island, Ternate was threatened by conquests and invasions from the British through Sir Francis Drake.

In his dated letter of 16 June 1582, Ronquillo de Peñalosa suggested to the King of Spain of further fortifications of Spanish footholds in the country. He also said that the Spaniards must dominate the Portuguese in Moluccas, and planned for possible seizing of Macau from Portugal. In a reply letter from the King, Philip II instructed the governor on how to initiate the repartimiento (forced labor) among Indios. In 1582, the Spaniards won and defended Cagayan from Sino-Japanese pirates from possible terrorism and invasion.

== Post-governorship and death ==
Former governor-general Francisco de Sande's chief enemy and Manila's attorney-general Captain Gabriel de Rivera filed a complaint against Ronquillo de Peñalosa for being the captain-general of the Philippines for life. In 1583, upon processing of Rivera's complaint, Ronquillo de Peñalosa died at his house in Manila. He was succeeded by his own nephew, Diego Ronquillo in office.

Political offices
Preceded by Francisco de Sande	Governor and Captain-General of the Philippines; 1580–1583	Succeeded by Diego Ronquillo
