= Alonzo Sánchez =

Spanish Jesuit missionary

Alonso Sánchez (1547 – 27 May 1593) was a Spanish Jesuit missionary, one of the first Jesuits in the Philippines.

== Life ==
Born in Mondéjar, Guadalajara, Spain, he entered the Society of Jesus at Alcalá on 27 May 1565. He was rector of the college of Navalcarnero, taught grammar for five years, and in 1579 went to the mission of Mexico, where he was rector of the seminary.

Early in 1581 he set out for the Philippines with Bishop Domingo de Salazar. Sánchez and his companion, Antonio Sedeno, and a lay brother, were the first Jesuits in these islands. The bishop made Sánchez his counsellor, appointed him to write the acts of the synod of Manila, and, when Sánchez was sent on an embassy to China, interrupted the synod until Sánchez had returned.

Twice Sánchez was despatched on official business to China, where he met celebrated Jesuit missionaries of that country and from Japan. He was thus able to publish later an account of the state of Christianity of China at the end of the sixteenth century. He was also a promoter of the empresa de China.

By the unanimous vote of all the Spanish officials, civil and religious, of the merchants and other leading citizens, Sánchez was chosen to go to Madrid as representative of the colony in 1586. Sánchez's mission to Philip II of Spain was very successful, his arguments moving the king to retain the islands, which many of his advisors had been urging him to abandon. From Madrid he went to Rome, and was there welcomed by Pope Sixtus V, from whom he received many privileges for the Catholic church in the Philippines. In a brief of 28 June 1591, Pope Gregory XIV praises the apostolic labours and writings of Sánchez, calling him a true defender of the authority and rights of the Holy See. Pope Innocent IX addressed to him the bull Inter felices, in which he lauds his work. Pope Clement VIII at his request granted various favours to the bishop and clergy in the islands.

Sánchez gave an account of the Jesuit missions in the Philippines to Aquaviva, the general of the Society of Jesus. It had been proposed to withdraw the priests from the Archipelago, but Aquaviva, following the plan proposed by Sánchez, determined that the society should remain, and made the Manila residence a college with Sedeno as its first rector.

Sánchez now asked to be allowed to return to the Philippines, but was sent instead as visitor to some of the Spanish provinces of the Society of Jesus, where there were serious domestic and external troubles. The tact of Sánchez gained the day; he expelled some influential but turbulent members from the Society, and won over the king, the Inquisition, and prominent personages, so that they became better disposed towards the Society.

Sánchez was elected one of the representatives of the Province of Toledo to the Fifth General Congregation of the Society, but he remarked that he had a more important journey to make than the one to Rome. He died twelve days later, at Alcalá de Henares, on the feast of the Ascension.

== Works ==
His writings include chiefly short treatises, memorials, and the like. A catalogue and summary of forty-one of these, drawn up by the author, is given by Colín.
