= Diego Ronquillo =

Spanish governor of the Philippines

5th Governor and Captain-General of the Philippines
- In office March 10, 1583 – May 16, 1584
- Monarch: Philip II of Spain
- Governor: (Viceroy of New Spain); Lorenzo Suárez de Mendoza, 5th Count of Coruña; Luis de Villanueva y Zapata
- Preceded by: Gonzalo Ronquillo de Peñalosa
- Succeeded by: Santiago de Vera

Diego Ronquillo was the fifth Spanish governor of the Philippines, from March 10, 1583, until May 1584. He was a relative of his predecessor, Gonzalo Ronquillo de Peñalosa, and served as interim governor for little more than a year. Manila suffered heavy damage from a fire that occurred on March 19, 1583.

Political offices
Preceded by Gonzalo Ronquillo de Peñaloza	Governor and Captain-General of the Philippines; 1583–1584	Succeeded by Santiago de Vera
