= List of conflicts in the Philippines =

This list of conflicts in the Philippines is a timeline of events that includes pre-colonial wars, Spanish–Moro conflict, Philippine revolts against Spain, battles, skirmishes, and other related items that have occurred in the Philippines' geographical area.

== List ==
| Conflict | Combatant 1 | Combatant 2 | Results |
Precolonial period
| Battle of Maynila (1365); Majapahit–Luzon conflict | Maynila | Majapahit: Majapahit naval forces | Inconclusive; Unspecified and disputed battle according to the Nagarakretagama. |
| Moro raid of Po-ni (Note: (modern day Brunei)) (1369) | Sulu: Sulu forces | Majapahit Empire: Majapahit fleet | Decisive Majapahit victory: Po-ni was left weaker; Majapahit succeeded in driving away the Sulu |
| Tamil rebellion (c. 1400) Visayan Nobles | Sri Lumay; Sri Alho; Sri Ukob | Chola Empire: Forces from Sumatra | Tamil victory: Establishment of the Rajahnate of Cebu; Successful escape of Sri Lumay |
| Bruneian invasion of Palawan (c. 1477); Bruneian expansion | Kedatuan of Taytay; Natives of Palawan; Tagbanwa; Molbog; Taww't Bato; Aetas; Mangyans; Buhid tribes | Bruneian Empire; Sultanate of Sulu | Bruneian–Sulu victory Southern and central Palawan were annexed by Brunei. |
| Bruneian invasion of Mindoro (c. 1500) | Ma-i | Bruneian Empire | Bruneian victory: Fall of Ma-i; The Islamization of Mindoro Island and coastal parts of Kumintang from the Buddhist Faith. |
| Bruneian-Tundun War (c. 1500) | Tundun | Bruneian Empire | Bruneian victory: Foundation of Kota Selurong (Maynila), a vassal state of Brunei.; Islamization of Tagalog people, especially in Tondo, from the Hindu–Buddhism faith. |
| Battle of Malabang and Lanao del Sur (c. 1475); Maguindanao expansion | Sultanate of Maguindanao: Sultan Mohammed Kabungsuwan; Samal warriors | Lumads | Maguindanao victory |
| Visayan Coalition (1500 CE.) A Visayan Royal couple. | Confederation of Madja-as; Madja-as forces; Kedatuan of Visayas: Datu Padojinog (Iloilo); Datu Balengkaka (Aklan); Datu Kabnayag (Kalibo); Datu Lubay (San Joaquin); Visayan forces | | Madja-as victory: Failure to conquer the Visayan confederation.; Escape of the hostaged Visayan villagers and slaves. |
| Battle of Mactan (1521) | Kedatuan of Mactan: Datu Lapulapu | Spanish Empire; Ferdinand Magellan †; Rajahnate of Cebu; Rajah Humabon; Datu Zula | Mactan victory: Death of Ferdinand Magellan; Departure of the Spanish expedition |
| Bohol-Ternatean War (1563) | Kingdom of Bohol: Datu Pagbuaya; Datu Sikatuna; Datu Sigala; Datu Dailisan † | Sultanate of Ternate: Hairun Jamilu; Portuguese mercenaries | Ternatean victory: Death of Datu Dailisan; 10,000 Bohol people flee to Dapitan. |
Spanish colonial period
| Spanish Conquest of Luzon and the Visayas (1565-1571): Conquest of Madja-as; Battle of Manila (1570); Battle of Bangkusay; Siege of Cainta (August 1571) | Maynila; Namayan; Tondo; Cainta; Madja-as | Spanish Empire: New Spain | Fall of the Luzon and Visayan Kingdoms.; Establishment of Spanish colonial territories in Luzon and islands of Visayas.; Establishment of Spanish East Indies and Manila as its capital |
| Battle of Manila (1574) | (Spain) Spanish Empire: Spanish Philippines; (Spain) Juan de Salcedo; (Spain) Guido de Lavezaris; (Spain) Martín de Goiti †; (Spain) Gaspar Ramírez; (Spain) Galo | Chinese pirates Wokou: Limahong; Sioco † | Spanish victory: Limahong retreated and abandoned his plans to invade Manila and instead settled in Pangasinan. |
| 1582 Cagayan battles | (Spain) Spanish Empire: Spanish Philippines; (Spain) Juan Pablo de Carrión; (Spain) Pedro Lucas † | Wokou: Tay Fusa | Spanish victory: Pirate activity became sparse; Establishment of the city of Nueva Segovia (now Lal-lo) |
| Battles of Playa Honda (1610-1624) | (Spain) Spanish Empire: Spanish Philippines; Juan Ronquillo del Castillo | Dutch Republic: Joris van Spilbergen | Spanish victory |
| Battles of La Naval de Manila (1646) | (Spain) Spanish Empire: Spanish Philippines; Diego Fajardo Chacón; Lorenzo Ugalde de Orellana; Sebastián López; (Spain) Agustín de Cepeda; Cristobal Marquéz de Valenzuela; Francisco de Esteyvar | Dutch Republic: Cornelis van der Lijn; Maarten Gerritsz Vries; Antonio Camb | Spanish victory |
| Battle of Puerto de Cavite (1647) | (Spain) Spanish Empire: Spanish Philippines | Dutch Republic | Spanish victory |
| Spanish campaigns in Lanao (1637–1639 CE) | Sultanates of Lanao: Sultans of Lanao; Datus of Lanao; 6,000 Maranao warriors | Spanish Empire: Spanish Conquistadors; Hurtado-de Curcuera; Captain Francesco Atienza; Captain Pedro Bermudez de Castr; Pedro Fernandez del Rio; 500 Visayan soldiers | Failure of the conquest and Christianize the Maranao people. |
| Battle of Manila (1762) (part of Seven Years' War) | (Spain) Spanish Empire: Spanish Philippines; Spanish garrison of Manila | Great Britain: British fleet; East India Company; William Draper | Spanish defeat: Manila and Cavite was occupied by the British until 1764 when a treaty concluded the war. |
| Spanish Conquest of Mindanao The Moros on their proas. | Sulu Sultanate Maguindanao Sultanate; Sultanates of Lanao | Spanish Empire: Captaincy General of the Philippines | Maguindanao is confined into the interior of Mindanao.; Spain conquers portions of Mindanao and Jolo and imposes protectorate status over the Moros of Sulu.; Spain failed to completely subjugate Moros. |
Philippine revolts against Spain
| Dagami Revolt (1565) | Rajahnate of Cebu: Datu Dagami; Rajah Tupas | Spanish Conquistadors: Miguel López de Legazpi; Pedro de Arana | Ceasefire: Treaty of Cebu (1565); Execution of Datu Dagami on 1567. |
| Tondo Conspiracy (1587) | Tondo; Maynila; Bulacan; Pampanga; Palawan: Maginoos; Agustin de Legazpi, Lakan of Tondo; Martin Pangan, datu of Tondo; Magat Salamat, datu of Tondo; Pitonggatan, datu of Tondo; Luis Amanicalao, datu of Tondo; Calao, datu of Tondo; Geronimo Bassi, datu of Tondo; Gabriel Tuambacar, datu of Tondo; Francisco Acta, datu of Tondo; Amarlangagui, datu of Tondo; Joan Banal, datu of Tondo; Alonso Lea, datu of Tondo; Esteban Taes, datu of Bulacan; Pedro Balinguit, datu of Pandacan; Agustín Manuguit, datu of Maysilo; Felipe Salalila, datu of Maysilo; Felipe Salonga, datu of Polo; Felipe Amarlangagui, datu of Catangalan; Omaghicon, datu of Navotas; Juan Basi, datu of Taguig; Daulat, datu of Castilla; Luis Balaya, datu of Bañgos; Dionisio Capolo (Kapulong), datu of Candaba; Amaghicon, datu of Cuyo; Dionisio Fernandez, Japanese Interpreter; Supported by: Japanese Captain Juan Gayo; Sultanate of Brunei | Spanish Empire: Spanish Conquistador; Miguel López de Legazpi; Governor-General De Vera; Spanish Encomenderos | Conspiracy failed: The uprising failed when they were betrayed to the Spanish authorities by Spanish Encomendero Pedro Sarmiento that pretended cooperation but turned traitor and Antonio Surabao (Susabau), datu of Calamianes.; The rebels were arrested, tried and found guilty of treason.; Executed and their properties wholly or partly confiscated are Agustín de Legazpi, Martín Pangan, Dionisio Fernandez, Omaghicon, Gerónimo Bassi, Felipe Salalila, Esteban Taes, and Magát Salamat.; Five leading members were exiled to Mexico: Pedro Balinguit, Pitonggatan, Felipe Salonga, Calao, and Agustín Manuguit. They were the very first natives of the Philippines to settle in New Spain (Mexico).; Exiled from their respective villages and fined were Felipe Amarlangagui, Daulat, Juan Basi, Dionisio Capolon, Luis Balaya, Luis Amanicalao, and five other Tondo chiefs namely Francisco Acta, Gabriel Tuambacar, Calao, Amarlangagui, and Joan Banál. Alonso Lea was acquitted. Still to be sentenced was Amaghicon. |
| Cagayan and Dingras Revolts Against the Tribute (1589) | Ilocanos and Ibanag | Spanish conquistadors: Santiago de Vera | Ceasefire: Rebels pardoned.; The tax system was reformed. |
| Magalat Revolt (1596) | Datu Magalat of Cagayan: People of Cagayan Valley | Spanish and Filipino colonial troops: Pedro de Chaves | Revolutionary defeat: Death of Datu Magalat |
| Igorot Revolt (Cordillera 1601) | Igorot clans and tribes: Igorot people; Bontoc; Ibaloi; Ifugao; Ibilao | Spanish conquistadors: Francisco de Tello de Guzmán; Captain Aranda; Spanish colonial troops; Pangasinan soldiers; Kapampangan soldiers | Ceasefire: The Spaniards were only able to gain nominal political and military control over them. |
| Sangley Rebellion (1603) | Sangleys | Spanish Empire | Sangley defeat |
| Caquenga's Revolt (1607) | Babaylan Caquenga | Spanish Empire | Rebellion failed |
| Bankaw revolt (1621-1622) | Bankaw or Bancao, datu of Limasawa, Carigara, Abuyog, Sogod; Babaylan Pagali | Spanish Empire: Governor-General Alonso Fajardo de Entenza; Juan de Alcarazo, Alcalde mayor of Cebu; Spanish and Filipino colonial soldiers in forty ships | Rebels defeated |
| Sumuroy Revolt (1649-1650) | Agustin Sumuroy: Don Juan Ponce; Don Pedro Caamug; David Dula y Goiti | Spanish Empire: Spanish and Filipino colonial troops | Revolutionary defeat: Agustin Sumuroy was killed by his own men. |
| Silang Revolt (1762–1763) | Diego Silang; Gabriela Silang: Ilocanos | Spanish Empire: Spanish Philippines; Spanish and Filipino colonial troops | Spanish victory: Defeat of the Ilocanos.; Gabriela Silang was executed by Spanish authorities in Vigan on September 10, 1763. |
| Palmero Conspiracy (1828) | Palmero brothers | Spanish Empire | Spanish victory: Conspiracy was discovered; Main conspirators exiled |
| Cavite Mutiny (1872) | Filipino mutineers: Fernando La Madrid | Spanish Empire: Governor General Rafael Izquierdo; Sgt. Ferdinand La Madrid | Mutineer defeat: Aftermath of the mutiny, all Filipino soldiers were disarmed and later sent into exile in Mindanao.; Execution of Gomburza and other 44 mutineers. |
Philippine Revolution
| Philippine Revolution (1896-1898) Regular soldiers of the Philippine army stand at attention for the inspection. Filipino revolutionaries exiled to Hong Kong. Sitting on Emilio Aguinaldo's right is Lt. Col. Miguel Primo de Rivera, nephew and aide-de-camp of Fernando Primo de Rivera and father of José Antonio Primo de Rivera. Standing behind Aguinaldo is Col. Gregorio del Pilar. Miguel was held hostage until Aguinaldo's indemnity was paid. Standing behind Miguel and to his right is Pedro Paterno. | 1896-97 Sovereign Tagalog Nation; Katipunan; 1897; Republic of Biak-na-Bato; 1898; Filipino Revolutionaries; Supported by: United States | Spain: Spanish Philippines; Spanish Cuba; Spanish Puerto Rico | Peace treaty (1897): Signing of Pact of Biak-na-Bato.; Victory (1898): Resumption of hostilities during Spanish–American War.; Expulsion of the Spanish colonial government.; Establishment of First Philippine Republic with Emilio Aguinaldo as the first President (1899); Official establishment of the Philippine Republican Army (1899); Outbreak of the Philippine–American War (1899). |
| Cry of Pugad Lawin (August 23, 1896) | Katipunan: Andrés Bonifacio | Spain: Guardia Civil | Start of the Philippine Revolution; Formation of an insurgent government |
| Battle of Pasong Tamo (August 28–29, 1896) | Katipunan: Andrés Bonifacio | Spain: Manuel Ros | Filipino defeat: Katipuneros retreat to Balara; Major revolts and uprisings began in other Provinces |
| Battle of Manila (1896) (Manila, Philippines August 29, 1896) | Katipunan: Andrés Bonifacio; Emilio Jacinto; Aguedo del Rosario; Vicente Fernandez | Spain: Ramón Blanco; Camilo de Polavieja | Filipino defeat |
| Battle of San Juan del Monte (August 30, 1896) | Katipunan: Andrés Bonifacio; Emilio Jacinto; Ramon Bernardo | Spain: Ramón Blanco; Camilo Rambaud; Bernardo Echaluce | Spanish victory: Start of the revolution in Luzon |
| Battle of Noveleta (August 30, 1896) | Katipunan: Magdiwang; Santiago Alvarez; Pascual Alvarez | Spain: Guardia Civil; Ramón Blanco; Diego de los Ríos | Filipino victory |
| Battle of San Francisco de Malabon (August 31, 1896) | Katipunan: Magdiwang; Diego Mojica; Artemio Ricarte; Nicolas Portilla | Spain: Guardia Civil; Ramón Blanco | Filipino victory: Katipuneros capture San Francisco De Malabon |
| Kawit revolt (August 31, 1896) | Katipunan: Magdalo; Emilio Aguinaldo | Spain: Guardia Civil; Ramón Blanco | Filipino victory |
| Battle of Imus (Imus, Cavite September 1–3, 1896) | Katipunan: Magdalo; Emilio Aguinaldo; Baldomero Aguinaldo; Candido Tirona; Jose Tagle; Guillermo Samoy † | Spain: Guardia Civil; Ramón Blanco; Ernesto de Aguirre; Jose Togores | Filipino victory |
| Cry of Nueva Ecija (September 2–5, 1896) | Katipunan: Mariano Llanera; Pantaleon Valmonte (executed); Manuel Tinio | Spain: Guardia Civil; Joaquin Machorro †; Lopez Arteaga | Tactical Filipino victory Strategic Spanish victory: Start of the Philippine Revolution in Central Luzon |
| Battles of Batangas (October 23, 1896) | Katipunan: Magdiwang; Miguel Malvar | Spain: Guardia Civil; Ramón Blanco | Tactical Spanish victory |
| Battle of San Mateo and Montalban (November 7, 1896) | Katipunan: Andrés Bonifacio; Emilio Jacinto; Mariano Gutierrez; Luis Malinis; Macario Sakay | Spain: Guardia Civil; Ramón Blanco; Camilo de Polavieja | Tactical Spanish victory: Start of the revolution in Morong |
| Battle of Binakayan–Dalahican (November 9–11, 1896) | Katipunan: Magdalo; Magdiwang; Matagumpay; Emilio Aguinaldo; Santiago Alvarez; Pio del Pilar; Candido Tirona †; Crispulo Aguinaldo; Baldomero Aguinaldo; Gregoria Montoya †; Artemio Ricarte; Pascual Alvarez; Edilberto Evangelista; Vito Belarmino; Pantaleon Garcia; Mariano Riego de Dios | Spain: Guardia Civil; Ramón Blanco; Diego de los Ríos; Fermín Díaz Matoni; José Marina; Mariano Borraja †; Victoriano Oloriz; Marcelino Muñoz; Norberto Baturone y Gener †; José Castro †; Fernando Chacon † | Filipino victory': Filipinos liberate all of Cavite and parts of Laguna and Batangas. |
| Battle of Sambat (November 15–16, 1896) | Katipunan: Severino Taino; Francisco Abad † | Spain: Guardia Civil; Nicolas Jaramillo | Spanish victory: Defeat of Maluningning Katipunan Chapter |
| Battle of Pateros (December 31, 1896 – January 3, 1897) | Katipunan: Magdalo; Matagumpay; Emilio Aguinaldo; Pío del Pilar; Mariano Noriel | Spain: Guardia Civil; Camilo de Polavieja Francisco Galbis | Filipino tactical victory Spanish strategic victory |
| Battle of Kakarong de Sili (January 1, 1897) | Katipunan: Kakarong Republic; Eusebio Roque (executed); Canuto Villanueva; Gregorio del Pilar | Spain: Guardia Civil; (Spain) José Olaguer Feliú | Spanish victory: Katipunan rebels wage guerrilla warfare in Bulacan province; Dissolution of the Kakarong Republic |
| Cry of Tarlac (January 24, 1897) | Katipunan: Francisco Macabulos | Spain: Guardia Civil | Filipino victory |
| Battle of Perez Dasmariñas (January 24, 1897) | Katipunan: Emilio Aguinaldo; Crispulo Aguinaldo †; Flaviano Yengko †; Placido Campos; Marcela Marcelo † | Spain: Guardia Civil; Jose de Lachambre; Antonio Zabala † | Spanish victory |
| Battle of Zapote Bridge (February 17, 1897) The Zapote Bridge (1897) by Vicente Dizon. | Katipunan: Magdalo; Emilio Aguinaldo; Edilberto Evangelista †; Tomas Mascardo | Spain: Camilo de Polavieja José de Lachambre | Filipino victory |
| Retreat to Montalban (May 3, 1897 - June 14, 1897) | Katipunan: Emilio Aguinaldo; Manuel Tinio | Spain: Primo de Rivera; Ricardo Monet General Nuñez | Tactical Spanish victory Strategic Filipino victory |
| Raid on Paombong (September 3, 1897) | Katipunan: Gregorio del Pilar | Spain: Ramón Blanco y Erenas | Tactical Filipino victory |
| Battle of Aliaga (September 4–5, 1897) | Katipunan: Emilio Aguinaldo; Manuel Tinio; Mamerto Natividad; Casimiro Tinio; Pio del Pilar; Jose Ignacio Paua; Eduardo Llanera | Spain: Fernando Primo de Rivera; Ricardo Monet; General Nuñez | Filipino victory |
| Battle of Tres de Abril (April 3–8, 1898) | Katipunan: Leon Kilat †; Arcadio Maxilom; Florencio Gonzales; Florencio Llamas; Jose Ignacio Paua; Bonifacio Aranas | Spain: (Spain) Fernando Primo de Rivera | Spanish victory |
| Battle of Manila Bay (near Manila, Philippines May 1, 1898) Contemporary colored print, showing USS Olympia in the left foreground, leading the U.S. Asiatic Squadron against the Spanish fleet off Cavite. A vignette portrait of Rear Admiral George Dewey is featured in the lower left. | United States: George Dewey | Spain: Patricio Montojo | American Victory |
| Battle of Alapan (Imus, Cavite May 28, 1898) | Filipino Revolutionaries: Emilio Aguinaldo; Artemio Ricarte; Mariano Noriel; Luciano San Miguel; Juan Cailles | Spain: Leopoldo García Peña (surrendered) | Decisive Filipino victory: General Leopoldo Garcia Peña become prisoner of war.; Surrender of all Spanish forces in Cavite to Filipino forces; Raising of the Philippine National Flag for the first time |
| Battle of Tayabas (June 24 – August 15, 1898) | Filipino Revolutionaries: Miguel Malvar; Vicente Lukban; Manuel Arguelles; Eleuterio Marasigan | Spain: Joaquin Pacheco Yanguas | Filipino victory: Filipino revolutionaries recapture Tayabas province |
| Mock Battle of Manila (Manila, Philippines August 13, 1898) "Raising the American flag over Fort Santiago, Manila, on the evening of August 13, 1898." drawing from Harper's Pictorial History of the War with Spain. | United States: Wesley Merritt; Arthur MacArthur Jr.; George Dewey; Filipino Revolutionaries: Emilio Aguinaldo; Antonio Luna | Spain: Fermin Jáudenes; Basilio Augustín | American victory: Spanish forces surrender the city to the Americans; End of the Spanish–American War in the Philippines |
| Siege of Masbate (Masbate, Philippines - August 19, 1898) | Filipino Revolutionaries: Riego de Dios; Justo Lukban; Pedro Quipte | Spain: Don Luis Cubero | Filipino victory: Establishment of Masbate revolutionary government |
| Negros Revolution (Negros Island, Philippines - November 3, 1898 - November 24, 1898) | Filipino Revolutionaries: Negrense Revolutionaries; Aniceto Lacson; Juan Araneta | (Spain) Spanish Empire: Guardia Civil; (Spain) Isidro de Castro (surrendered) (Spain) Maximiano Correa | Decisive Filipino victory: Surrender of Spanish troops; establishment of Republic of Negros |
| Battle of Barrio Yoting (Pilar Capiz, Visayas - December 3, 1898) the Katipuneros. | Filipino Revolutionaries: Roque Lopez; Martin Delgado; Perfecto Poblador; Teresa Magbanua | Spain: (Spain) Diego de los Rios (Spain) Juan Lopez y Herrero | Filipino victory |
| Siege of Baler (Baler, Aurora July 1, 1898 – June 2, 1899) Filipino troops of Colonel Tecson in Baler, May 1899. Tecson is to the right of the cannon, Novicio to the left. | 1898; Filipino Revolutionaries 1899; República Filipina: Teodorico Novicio Luna; Calixto Villacorta; Cirilo Gómez; Simón Tecson | Spain: Enrique de las Morenas; Juan Alonso Zayas; Saturnino Martín Cerezo; United States | Filipino victory: Baler held beyond official cessation of hostilities and cession of Philippine Islands; Failure of American relief efforts; Negotiated armistice after the surrender of the Spanish troops.; Emilio Aguinaldo of the Philippine Republic issued a decree that they were not to be considered as POWs but as friends.; Considered by some as the end of the Spanish Empire |
Philippine–American War
| Philippine–American War; February 4, 1899 – July 2, 1902; Moro Rebellion: 1899-1913 Filipino soldiers outside Manila in 1899. Wounded American soldiers at Santa Mesa, Manila in 1899 | 1899-1902; República Filipina: Republic of Negros; Babaylanes; Pulajanes; Republic of Zamboanga; Limited Foreign Support: Empire of Japan: Shishi; 1902-1906; Tagalog Republic: Irrenconcilables; 1899-1913; Sultanates of Lanao; Maguindanao Sultanate; Sulu Sultanate | 1899-1902; United States: Military Government; 1902-1913; United States: Insular Government | Filipino defeat: Fall of the First Republic.; General Emilio Aguinaldo was captured, and recognized U.S. sovereignty.; American Occupation of the Philippine Islands.; The establishment of the Insular Government. |
| Battle of Manila (Manila, Philippines February 4–5, 1899) U.S. soldiers of the First Nebraska volunteers, company B, near Manila in 1899. | República Filipina: Emilio Aguinaldo; Antonio Luna; Luciano San Miguel | United States: Elwell S. Otis; Arthur MacArthur Jr.; Thomas M. Anderson | Filipino defeat: Start of the Philippine–American War. |
| Battle of Caloocan (Caloocan, Philippines February 10, 1899) Maj. Gen. Arthur MacArthur observing the battle. | República Filipina: Antonio Luna | United States: Arthur MacArthur Jr.; Harrison Gray Otis; Frederick Funston | Filipino defeat |
| Second Battle of Caloocan (Caloocan, Philippines February 22–24, 1899) Filipinos attack the barracks of the 13th Minnesota Volunteers. | República Filipina: Antonio Luna; Mariano Llanera | United States: Arthur MacArthur, Jr. | Filipino defeat |
| Battle of Balantang (Balantang, Jaro, Iloilo, Philippines March 10, 1899) | República Filipina: Pascual Magbanua | United States | Filipino victory: Filipino troops retaking Jaro from the Americans. |
| Capture of Malolos (Malolos, Bulacan, Philippines March 25–31, 1899) Filipino soldiers in Malolos | República Filipina: (First Philippine Republic) Antonio Luna | United States: (United States) Arthur MacArthur Jr.; (United States) Loyd Wheaton; (United States) Irving Hale; (United States) Frederick Funston | Filipino defeat: Capture of the capital of Malolos, Bulacan. |
| Battle of Marilao River (Marilao, Bulacan, Philippines March 27, 1899) | República Filipina: (First Philippine Republic) Emilio Aguinaldo | United States: (United States) Irving Hale | Filipino defeat |
| Battle of Santa Cruz (1899) (Santa Cruz, Laguna, Philippines April 9–10, 1899) General Henry W. Lawton leading American forces at the Battle of Santa Cruz during the Laguna de Bay Campaign | República Filipina: (First Philippine Republic) Juan Cailles | United States: (United States) Henry W. Lawton; (United States) Charles King | Filipino defeat |
| Battle of Pagsanjan (Pagsanjan, Laguna, Philippines April 11, 1899) | República Filipina | United States: (United States) Henry W. Lawton; (United States) Charles King | Filipino defeat |
| Battle of Paete (Paete, Laguna, Philippines April 12, 1899) General Lawton campaigning in the Philippines, 1899 | República Filipina | United States: (United States) Henry W. Lawton | Filipino defeat |
| Battle of Quingua (Quingua - now Plaridel, Bulacan, Philippines April 23, 1899) Kurz & Allison print of the Battle of Quingua | República Filipina: Gregorio del Pilar; Pablo Tecson | United States: J. Franklin Bell; John Stotsenburg †; Irving Hale | 1st Phase: Filipino victory: Death of Col. John M. Stotsenburg; 2nd Phase: Filipino defeat: Filipinos retreated to the North. |
| Battles of Bagbag and Pampanga Rivers (Calumpit, Bulacan, Philippines April 25–27, 1899) | República Filipina: (First Philippine Republic) Antonio Luna; Gregorio del Pilar | United States: (United States) Arthur MacArthur Jr.; (United States) Loyd Wheaton; (United States) Irving Hale; (United States) Frederick Funston | Filipino defeat: Retreat to Pampanga |
| Battle of Santo Tomas (Santo Tomas, Pampanga, Philippines May 4, 1899) 1st Nebraska Volunteers advancing during the Battle of Santo Tomas | República Filipina: (First Philippine Republic) Antonio Luna; (First Philippine Republic) Venacio Concepción; (First Philippine Republic) Alejandro Avecilla | United States: (United States) Loyd Wheaton; (United States) Irving Hale; (United States) Frederick Funston | Filipino defeat |
| Battle of Zapote River (Las Piñas, Province of Manila, Philippines June 13, 1899) The reconnected Zapote Bridge in 1899 being guarded by an American soldier after the battle on June 13, 1899. One span of the bridge was removed by the locals, substituted with a wooden span, which was burned down before the fighting. | República Filipina: (First Philippine Republic) Artemio Ricarte; (First Philippine Republic) Guillermo Masangkay | United States: (United States) Henry W. Lawton | Filipino defeat |
| Battle of Olongapo (Olongapo, Zambales, Philippines September 18–23, 1899) | República Filipina | United States: (United States) Elwell Stephen Otis | Filipino defeat |
| Battle of San Jacinto (1899) (San Jacinto, Pangasinan, Philippines November 11, 1899) | República Filipina: Manuel Tinio | United States: Loyd Wheaton | Filipino defeat |
| Battle of Tirad Pass (Tirad Pass, Ilocos Sur, Philippines December 2, 1899) Gen.Gregorio del Pilar and his troops, around 1898. | República Filipina: Gregorio del Pilar †; Vicente Enriquez | United States: Peyton C. March | Strategic Filipino victory Tactical Filipino defeat: Death of General Gregorio del Pilar; Fall of the defence line; Filipino forces successfully delay the American advance |
| Battle of Paye (San Mateo, Manila (now Rizal), Philippines December 19, 1899) Death of Major-General Henry Lawton during the battle. | República Filipina: Pio del Pilar; Licerio Gerónimo | United States: Henry Ware Lawton †; James R. Lockett | Tactical Filipino victory Strategic Filipino defeat: Death of General Henry Ware Lawton; American's 29th Battalion successfully crossed the river at 11 am; Filipino forces retreated from San Mateo. |
| Battle of Cagayan de Misamis (Cagayan de Misamis (now Cagayan de Oro), Mindanao, Philippines April 7, 1900) | República Filipina: Gen. Nicolas Capistrano | United States: Col. Edward A. Godwin | Filipino defeat |
| Siege of Catubig (Catubig, Philippines April 15–19, 1900) | República Filipina: (First Philippine Republic) Domingo Rebadulla | United States: (United States) J. T. Sweeney | Filipino victory |
| Battle of Agusan Hill (Cagayan de Oro, Mindanao, Philippines May 14, 1900) | República Filipina: (First Philippine Republic) Capt. Vicente Roa † | United States: (United States) Capt. Walter B. Elliot | Filipino defeat |
| Battle of Makahambus Hill (Cagayan de Oro, Mindanao, Philippines June 4, 1900) | República Filipina: (First Philippine Republic) Pablo Tecson; (First Philippine Republic) Apolinar Velez | United States: (United States) Albert Laws; (United States) Thomas Millar | Filipino victory |
| Battle of Pulang Lupa (Marinduque, Philippines September 13, 1900) | República Filipina: Maximo Abad | United States: Luther Hare; (United States) Devereux Shields (surrendered) | Filipino victory |
| Battle of Mabitac (Mabitac, Laguna, Philippines September 17, 1900) Gen. Juan Cailles. | República Filipina: Juan Cailles | United States: Benjamin Cheatham Jr. | Filipino victory |
| Battle of Lonoy (Lonoy, Jagna, Bohol, Philippines March 5, 1901) | República Filipina: Capt. Gregorio Casenas † | United States. | Filipino defeat |
| Battle of Balangiga (Balangiga, Samar, Philippines March September 28, 1901) | República Filipina: Valeriano Abanador (Note: Two participants in the attack named the following persons as the chief organizers of the military operation: Pedro Abayan, Mayor of Balangiga; Adronico Balais, Vice Mayor; Valeriano Abanador, Chief of Police; Mariano Valdenor, Assistant Chief of Police; Captain Eugenio Daza, Area Commander of General Vicente Lukban's forces for Southeastern Samar; Pedro Duran, a Sergeant under Diaz; Juan Salazar; Evangelista Gabornes, Councilor; Paulo Gavan Gacho; Other sources showed that, while General Lukban viewed Daza as the overall commander, Daza acknowledged Abanador's operational command of the attack.); (First Philippine Republic) Eugenio Daza | United States Thomas W. Connell † | Filipino victory |
| Battle of Dolores River (Samar, Philippines December 12, 1904) | Pulahan: Pedro de la Cruz | United States: Philippine Constabulary; Stephen Hayt | American defeat |
Moro rebellion
| Battle of Bayang (Malabang, South of Lanao Lake, Mindanao, Philippines May 2–3, 1902) Battle of Bayang | Sultanates of Lanao: Sultan Pandapatan | United States: Colonel Frank D. Baldwin | American victory: Start of Moro rebellion |
| Hassan uprising (Sulu, Mindanao, Philippines October 1903 – March 1904) | Sultanate of Sulu: Datu Panglima Hassan; Usap Laksamana | United States: Col. H. Scott | American victory |
| Battle of Siranaya (Siranaya, Mindanao, Philippines March 1904) | Sultanate of Maguindanao: Datu Ali | United States: Leonard Wood | American victory |
| Battle of Taraca (Taraka, Lanao del Sur, Philippines April 1904) | Sultanates of Lanao | United States: Leonard Wood | American victory |
| Battle of the Malalag River (Malalag, Davao del Sur, Philippines October 22, 1905) | Sultanate of Maguindanao: Datu Ali † | United States: Frank Ross McCoy | American victory |
| First Battle of Bud Dajo (Bud Dajo, Jolo Island, Philippines March 5–8, 1906) U.S. soldiers pose with Moro dead after the battle | Sultanate of Sulu | United States: Gen. Leonard Wood; Col. Joseph W. Duncan | American victory |
| Second Battle of Bud Dajo (Bud Dajo, Jolo Island, Philippines December 18–26, 1911) | Sultanate of Sulu | United States: John J. Pershing | American victory |
| Battle of Bud Bagsak (Jolo Island, Philippines June 11–15, 1913) "Knocking Out the Moros" | Sultanate of Sulu: Datu Amil †; Datu Sahipa | United States: John J. Pershing | American victory: Total annexation of the Philippines |
Second World war
| Japanese invasion of the Philippines (1941-1942); Japanese occupation of the Philippines (1942-1944); Allied liberation of the Philippines (1944-1945) Japanese Troops surrender to the 40th Infantry Division. | Commonwealth of the Philippines; United States Co-belligerent: Hukbalahap | Japanese Empire: Second Philippine Republic | Allied defeat (1941-1942): Fall of Bataan and Corregidor.; Surrender of Filipino-American forces from the Japanese.; Establishment of a pro-Japan Council of State.; Philippine Commonwealth government forced into exile.; Japanese occupation (1942-1945): Ongoing Commonwealth military and guerrilla war against Japanese occupation forces.; Japanese puppet state Second Republic established.; Bureau of Constabulary and Makapili established by the Japanese Occupation and Second Republic.; Allied victory (1944-1945): Allied forces liberate the Philippines; Philippine Constabulary re-established under the Commonwealth regime; Surrender of Japan; Second Republic is dissolved and the Commonwealth returns; The Philippines become independent from the United States |
| Japanese invasion of Batan Island (Batan Island, Philippines December 8, 1941) A map of Luzon Island showing Japanese landings and advances from December 8, 1941, to January 8, 1942. | Commonwealth of the Philippines; United States | Japanese Empire | Allied defeat |
| Japanese invasion of Vigan (Vigan, Ilocos Sur, Philippines December 10, 1941) | Commonwealth of the Philippines; United States | Japanese Empire | Allied defeat |
| Japanese invasion of Aparri (Aparri, Cagayan, Philippines December 10, 1941) | Commonwealth of the Philippines; United States | Japanese Empire | Allied defeat |
| Japanese invasion of Legazpi (Legazpi, Albay, Philippines December 12, 1941) | Commonwealth of the Philippines; United States | Japanese Empire | Allied Defeat |
| Japanese invasion of Lingayen Gulf (Lingayen Gulf, Philippines December 21–23, 1941) | Commonwealth of the Philippines; United States | Japanese Empire | Allied defeat |
| Japanese invasion of Lamon Bay (Lamon Bay, Philippines December 21–23, 1941) | Commonwealth of the Philippines; United States | Japanese Empire | Allied defeat |
| Battle of Bataan (Bataan Peninsula near Manila Bay in Luzon Island, Philippines January 7 – April 9, 1942) Japanese tank column advancing in the Bataan Peninsula of Luzon | Commonwealth of the Philippines; United States: (United States) Douglas MacArthur; (United States) Jonathan Mayhew Wainwright IV; (United States) George M. Parker; (United States) Edward P. King; (Commonwealth of the Philippines) Vicente Lim; (Commonwealth of the Philippines) Mateo Capinpin | Japanese Empire: (Empire of Japan) Masaharu Homma; (Empire of Japan) Susumu Morioka; (Empire of Japan) Kineo Kitajima; (Empire of Japan) Kameichiro Nagano | Allied defeat: Beginning of the Bataan Death March |
| Battle of Corregidor (Corregidor island in Manila Bay, Luzon Island, Philippines May 5–6, 1942) Victorious Japanese troops atop the Hearn Battery, May 6, 1942. | Commonwealth of the Philippines; United States: (United States) Jonathan M. Wainwright (POW); (United States) George F. Moore (POW); (United States) Samuel L. Howard (POW) | Japanese Empire: (Empire of Japan) Masaharu Homma; (Empire of Japan) Kureo Taniguchi; (Empire of Japan) Gempachi Sato; (Empire of Japan) Kizon Mikami; (Empire of Japan) Haruji Morita; (Empire of Japan) Col. Koike; (Empire of Japan) Col. Inoue | American defeat |
| Philippine resistance against Japan (Philippines December 8, 1941 - August 15, 1945) Propaganda poster depicting the Philippine resistance movement | Commonwealth of the Philippines; United States (Taiwan) Chinese volunteers Hukbalahap (Note: Also attacked non-Huk guerrillas) Moros (Note: Also attacked American & Christian Filipino guerrillas): Wendell Fertig; Russell W. Volckmann; Edwin Ramsey; James M. Cushing; Robert Lapham; Marcos V. Agustin; Terry Adevoso; Ruperto Kangleon; Macario Peralta Jr.; Xu Jingcheng; Luis Taruc; Casto Alejandrino; Juan Feleo; Gumbay Piang; Salipada K. Pendatun | Japanese Empire: Philippine Executive Commission (until 1943); Second Philippine Republic (from 1943); Masaharu Homma; Shizuichi Tanaka; Shigenori Kuroda; Tomoyuki Yamashita; Jose P. Laurel; Jorge B. Vargas; Benigno Ramos #; Artemio Ricarte # | Allied victory |
| Battle of Leyte (Leyte Island, Philippines October 17 – December 26, 1944) General Douglas MacArthur and staff, accompanied by Philippine president Sergio Osmeña (left), land at Red Beach, Leyte, October 20, 1944. | Philippines; United States Army: (United States) Douglas MacArthur (United States) Walter Krueger (United States) Franklin C. Sibert (United States) John R. Hodge; Navy: (United States) Thomas C. Kinkaid; Army Air Force: (United States) George C. Kenney; Civilian Government: (Commonwealth of the Philippines) Sergio Osmeña; Guerrillas: (Commonwealth of the Philippines) Ruperto Kangleón | Japanese Empire Army: (Empire of Japan) Tomoyuki Yamashita (Empire of Japan) Sōsaku Suzuki (Empire of Japan) Shiro Makino † (Empire of Japan) Tsunehiro Shirai † (Empire of Japan) Yoshimi Adachi † (Empire of Japan) Kyoji Tominaga | Allied victory |
| Battle of Leyte Gulf (Leyte Gulf, Philippines October 23–26, 1944) The light aircraft carrier Princeton on fire, east of Luzon, on October 24, 1944 | United States: (United States) William Halsey (3rd Fleet); (United States) Thomas Kinkaid (7th Fleet); (United States) Clifton Sprague (Taffy 3 / Task Unit 77.4.3); (United States) Jesse Oldendorf (Task Group 77.2); (Australia) John Collins (Task Force 74) | Japanese Empire: (Empire of Japan) Takeo Kurita (Center Force); (Empire of Japan) Shōji Nishimura † (Southern Force); (Empire of Japan) Kiyohide Shima (Southern Force); (Empire of Japan) Jisaburō Ozawa (Northern Force); (Empire of Japan) Yukio Seki † (Kamikazes) | American victory |
| Battle off Samar (East of Samar Island, Philippines October 25, 1944) The escort carrier Gambier Bay, burning from earlier gunfire damage, is bracketed by a salvo from a Japanese cruiser (faintly visible in the background, center-right) shortly before sinking during the Battle off Samar. | United States: (United States) Clifton Sprague | Japanese Empire: (Empire of Japan) Takeo Kurita | American victory |
| Battle of Ormoc Bay (Camotes Sea, Philippines November 11 – December 21, 1944) Leyte campaign, November–December 1944 | United States: (United States) Douglas MacArthur | Japanese Empire: (Empire of Japan) Tomoyuki Yamashita | American victory |
| Battle of Mindoro (Mindoro Island, Philippines December 13–16, 1944) | United States: (United States) George M. Jones; (United States) Roscoe B. Woodruff | Japanese Empire: (Empire of Japan) Rikichi Tsukada | American victory |
| Battle of Maguindanao (Maguindanao, Philippines January to September 1945) | United States; Commonwealth of the Philippines: (United States) Wendell Fertig; (Commonwealth of the Philippines) Gumbay Piang; (Commonwealth of the Philippines) Salipada K. Pendatun | Japanese Empire; Second Philippine Republic: (Empire of Japan) Gyosaku Morozumi | Allied victory |
| Invasion of Lingayen Gulf (Lingayen Gulf, Luzon, Philippines January 3–13, 1945) The U.S. Navy battleship USS Pennsylvania (BB-38) leading the battleship USS Colorado (BB-45) and the heavy cruiser USS Louisville (CA-28) to the shores of Lingayen. | United States: (United States) Jesse B. Oldendorf; (United States) Douglas MacArthur; (United States) Walter Krueger | Japanese Empire: (Empire of Japan) Tomoyuki Yamashita | American victory |
| Battle of Luzon (Luzon, Philippines January 9, 1945 – August 15, 1945) Baleta Pass, near Baugio, Luzon.jpg | United States: Commonwealth of the Philippines; Australia; Mexico; (United States) Douglas MacArthur; (United States) Walter Krueger; (Philippines) Sergio Osmeña; (Philippines) Basilio J. Valdes; (Mexico) Antonio Cárdenas Rodríguez | Japanese Empire: Second Philippine Republic; (Empire of Japan) Tomoyuki Yamashita; (Empire of Japan) Akira Mutō; (Empire of Japan) Shizuo Yokoyama | Allied victory: Allies liberate the Luzon island group |
| Battle of Bessang Pass (Ilocos Sur, Luzon, Philippines June 1–15, 1945) | United States; Commonwealth of the Philippines: (United States) Walter Krueger; (United States) Innis P. Swift; (United States) Russell W. Volckmann; (Philippines) Basilio J. Valdes | Japanese Empire; Second Philippine Republic: (Empire of Japan) Tomoyuki Yamashita; (Empire of Japan) Yoshiharu Ozaki | Allied victory: Allies liberate the Luzon island group |
| Raid at Cabanatuan (Cabanatuan, Nueva Ecija, Philippines January 30, 1945) Former Cabanatuan POWs in celebration, January 30, 1945 | United States; Commonwealth of the Philippines: Henry Mucci; (United States) Arthur D. Simons; (United States) Robert Prince; (Commonwealth of the Philippines) Juan Pajota; (Commonwealth of the Philippines) Eduardo Joson | Japanese Empire: (Empire of Japan) Tomoyuki Yamashita | Allied victory: Liberation of 552 Allied prisoners of war |
| Battle of Bataan (1945) (Bataan Peninsula, Philippines January 31 – February 21, 1945) | United States; Commonwealth of the Philippines: (United States) Charles P. Hall; (United States) Henry L.C. Jones; (United States) Aubrey S. Newman | Japanese Empire: (Empire of Japan) Rikichi Tsukada; (Empire of Japan) Nagayoshi Sanenobu | Allied victory |
| Battle of Manila (1945) (Manila, Philippines February 3 – March 3, 1945) An aerial view of the destroyed walled city of Intramuros taken in May 1945 | United States; Commonwealth of the Philippines: Douglas MacArthur; Oscar Griswold; Robert S. Beightler; Verne D. Mudge; Joseph M. Swing | Japanese Empire: Tomoyuki Yamashita; Sanji Iwabuchi † | Allied victory |
| Battle of Corregidor (1945) (Corregidor Island, Philippines February 16–26, 1945) USS Claxton provides fire support during the Corregidor landings | United States; Commonwealth of the Philippines: (United States) George M. Jones; (United States) Edward M. Postlethwait | Japanese Empire: (Empire of Japan) Rikichi Tsukada | American victory |
| Battle of Baguio (1945) (Baguio, Mountain Province, Luzon, Philippines February 21 – April 26, 1945) | United States; Commonwealth of the Philippines: (United States) Walter Krueger; (United States) Innis P. Swift (United States) Percy W. Clarkson; (United States) Robert S. Beightler; (United States) Russell W. Volckmann | Japanese Empire: (Empire of Japan) Tomoyuki Yamashita; (Empire of Japan) Fukutaro Nishiyama; (Empire of Japan) Noakata Utsunomiya; (Empire of Japan) Bunzo Sato | Allied victory: Allied forces liberate Baguio from Japanese occupiers |
| Raid on Los Baños (Los Baños, Laguna, Philippines February 23, 1945) Painting of a guerrilla armed with a bolo knife disarming a Japanese sentry of his rifle. | United States; Commonwealth of the Philippines: (United States) Henry A. Burgress; (United States) Edward Lahti; (United States) John Ringler; (United States) Robert H. Soule; (United States) Joseph W. Gibbs; (Philippines) Gustavo Inglés | Japanese Empire: (Empire of Japan) T. Iwanaka; (Empire of Japan) Sadaaki Konishi | Allied victory |
| Invasion of Palawan (Palawan island, Philippines February 28 – April 22, 1945) | United States: (United States) Robert L. Eichelberger; (United States) Thomas C. Kinkaid; (United States) Jens A. Doe; (United States) Harold H. Haney; (United States) William M. Fechteler | Japanese Empire: (Empire of Japan) Sōsaku Suzuki † | American victory |
| Battle of Mindanao (Mindanao Island, Philippines March 10 – August 15, 1945) LCM carries U.S. troops up the Mindanao River to Fort Pikit | United States; Commonwealth of the Philippines: (United States) Robert L. Eichelberger; (United States) Franklin C. Sibert; (United States) Albert G. Noble; (United States) Roscoe B. Woodruff; (United States) Clarence A. Martin; (United States) Wendell W. Fertig; (Commonwealth of the Philippines) Basilio J. Valdes; (Commonwealth of the Philippines) Salipada K. Pendatun | Japanese Empire: (Empire of Japan) Gyosaku Morozumi; (Empire of Japan) Jiro Harada; (Empire of Japan) Naoji Doi | Allied victory |
| Battle of Visayas (Visayas region, Philippines March 18 – August 15, 1945) U.S. soldiers during landings at Talisay Beach, Cebu Island, March 26, 1945. | United States; Commonwealth of the Philippines: (United States) Robert L. Eichelberger; (United States) Rapp Brush; (United States) William H. Arnold; (United States) James M. Cushing; (Commonwealth of the Philippines) Macario B. Peralta Jr.; (Commonwealth of the Philippines) Ruperto Kangleon | Japanese Empire: (Empire of Japan) Sōsaku Suzuki †; (Empire of Japan) Takeo Manjome † | Allied victory |
| Battle for Cebu City (Downtown Cebu City, Cebu Island, Philippines March 26 – April 8, 1945) US troops riding on an M7 Priest enter Cebu City | United States; Commonwealth of the Philippines: (United States) Robert L. Eichelberger; (United States) Ferdinand E. Zuellig; (United States) James M. Cushing; (Philippines) Basilio J. Valdes | Japanese Empire: (Empire of Japan) Takeo Manjome †; (Empire of Japan) Rijome Kawahara † | Allied victory |
| Battle of Davao (Davao City, Davao Province, Mindanao island, Philippines April 27 to June 10, 1945) | United States; Commonwealth of the Philippines: (United States) Douglas MacArthur; (United States) Robert L. Eichelberger; (United States) Clarence A. Martin; (United States) Roscoe B. Woodruff; (United States) Wendell W. Fertig; (Commonwealth of the Philippines) Basilio J. Valdes; (Commonwealth of the Philippines) Federico G. Ubuza; (Commonwealth of the Philippines) Armando Generoso; (Commonwealth of the Philippines) Saturnino Silva | Japanese Empire: (Empire of Japan) Gyosaku Morozumi; (Empire of Japan) Jiro Harada; (Empire of Japan) Muraji Kawazoe | Allied victory: Davao City and Davao Province liberated by the Allies |
| Battle of Mayoyao Ridge (Mayoyao, Mt. Province, Philippines July 26, 1945, to August 9, 1945) Japanese surrender ceremonies at Baguio, Luzon, on September 3, 1945 | United States; Commonwealth of the Philippines: (United States) Donald Blackburn | Japanese Empire | Allied victory: Surrender of General Tomoyuki Yamashita at Kiangan, Ifugao.; End of World War II in the Philippines |
The Cold War
| Hukbalahap Rebellion (1942-1954) | 1942–1946: United States: Commonwealth of the Philippines; Hukbalahap; 1946–1954: Republic of the Philippines; Supported by: United States | 1942–1945: Empire of Japan: Second Philippine Republic; 1946–1954: Communist Party: Hukbalahap; Alleged support: Soviet Union | First phase: Huk victory: End of the Occupation in 1945; Tension rises between the U.S Backed government and the Huks; Rebellion resume in 1946; Second Phase: Government victory: End of the Rebellion; Capture of Luis Taruc in 1954; Beginning of Communist insurgency in the Philippines in the 1960s |
Contemporary Era
| Moro insurgency (March 29, 1969 – present); Operation Enduring Freedom in the Philippines (January 15, 2002 – ongoing) M101 howitzer was widely use as the artillery in the operation against the Moro insurgencies in Mindanao. | Philippines Supported by: United States | Moro National Liberation Front (until 1996); Moro Islamic Liberation Front (until 2014) (Islamic State) Abu Sayyaf; Other Islamist groups | Cessation of armed conflict between the Government and MNLF/MILF: Ongoing conflict between the Government and Jihadist groups — Abu Sayyaf, Bangsamoro Islamic Freedom Fighters, and others |
| Communist Insurgency (1969–present) | Philippines | Communist Party of the Philippines: New People's Army; National Democratic Front | Ongoing |
| 1989 Philippine coup d'état attempt (December 1–9, 1989) | Philippines; United States; Archdiocese of Manila: (Philippines) Corazon Aquino; Fidel Ramos; Renato De Villa; Jaime Sin; (United States) George H. W. Bush Bernard John Smith; Harry Rittenour | RAM Movement: Gregorio Honasan; Edgardo Abenina; Jose Zumel | Government victory: Coup crushed by US intervention; Creation of the Davide Fact-Finding Commission; Arrest of Honasan and coup plotters, financiers and leaders but some were given amnesty later on |
| 1990 Mindanao crisis (October 4–6, 1990) | Philippines: (Philippines) Corazon Aquino; (Philippines) Renato de Villa | Federal Republic of Mindanao: Col. Alexander Noble | Government victory: Arrest of Col. Alexander Noble; Disestablishment of the Federal Republic of Mindanao |
| Battle of Camp Abubakar (July 9, 2000) | Philippines: Joseph Estrada; Diomedio Villanueva; Benjamin Defensor; Elonor Padre | Moro Islamic Liberation Front: Salamat Hashim; Murad Ebrahim | Government victory |
| Manila Peninsula siege (November 29, 2007) | Philippines: (Philippines) Gloria Macapagal Arroyo; (Philippines) Gen. Hermogenes Esperon | Bagong Katipuneros (Magdalo Group): Sen. Antonio Trillanes IV; Danilo Lim; Teofisto Guingona, Jr.; Nicanor Faeldon | Government victory: *Several members of the Magdalo Group were arrested. |
| Scarborough Shoal standoff (April 8, 2012 (start date)) | Philippines: Philippine Navy; Philippine Coast Guard | China: Chinese Navy; China Marine Surveillance; China Coast Guard | Scarborough Shoal occupied by China |
| Zamboanga City crisis (September 9–28, 2013) The Zamboanga City Hall where the MNLF intended to hoist the Bangsamoro Republik flag. | Philippines: (Philippines) Benigno Aquino; (Philippines) Voltaire Gazmin; (Philippines) Emmanuel T. Bautista; (Philippines) Noel A. Coballes; (Philippines) Maria Isabelle Climaco Salazar | Bangsamoro Republik: (Bangsamoro Republik) Nur Misuari; (Bangsamoro Republik) Ustadz Habier Malik; (Bangsamoro Republik) Asamin Hussin; (Bangsamoro Republik) Salip Idjal; (Bangsamoro Republik) Dasta Ismael †; (Bangsamoro Republik) Misba Balaji; (Bangsamoro Republik) Jul Lipae | Government victory: The Bangsamoro Republik ceases to exist, as it doesn't have de facto control of any territory.; All hostages recovered.; Dissolution of Bangsamoro Republik; Some "20 to 30" MNLF rebels, including Commander Habier Malik are still at-large.; Death of MNLF commander Dasta Ismael |
| Operation Darkhorse (January 27, – February 2, 2014) | Philippines: Armed Forces of the Philippines; Philippine National Police; Supported by: Moro Islamic Liberation Front | Bangsamoro Islamic Freedom Fighters: Ameril Umbra Kato; Ustadz Karialan; Abu Misry Mama | Government victory: Temporary stops in BIFF and government offensives. |
| Siege of Marawi (May 23 – October 23, 2017) A building in Marawi is set ablaze by airstrikes carried out by the Philippine Air Force. | Philippines: Supported by: Non-state supporters: Moro National Liberation Front; Moro Islamic Liberation Front; Foreign supporters: United States (Military equipment, aid, advisory roles, and technical assistance); United Kingdom (Intelligence support, military and medical aid); Australia (Intelligence support and advisory roles); China (Military equipment); Russia (Military equipment); Israel (Intelligence support and military equipment); Singapore (Intelligence and logistics support) | Islamic State: (Islamic State) Abu Sayyaf; (Islamic State) Maute group; (Islamic State) Bangsamoro Islamic Freedom Fighters; (Islamic State) Ansar Khalifa Philippines | Government victory: Failure of the militants to establish a provincial ISIL territory (wilayat); Isnilon Hapilon, Abu Sayyaf leader and ISIL Emir in Southeast Asia killed by the Philippine Army; All seven Maute brothers killed by the Philippine Army |

== Gallery ==
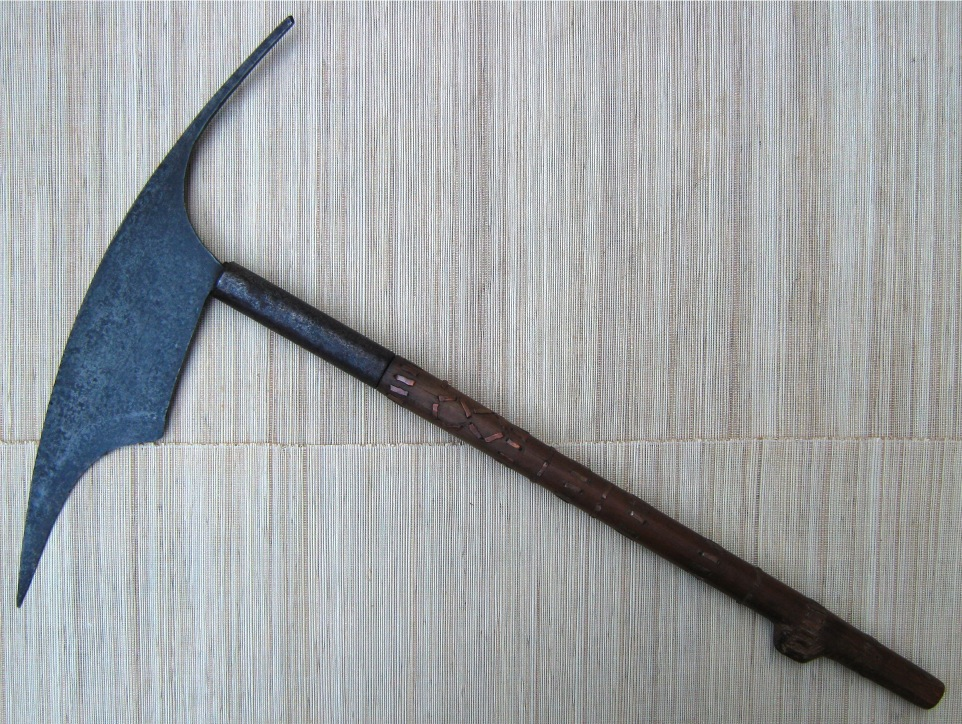
The Head Axe, used by the Head-hunters of Kalinga people, A fearsome Melee weapon in Cordillera (Specially against the Ifugao peoples during the Proto-history).

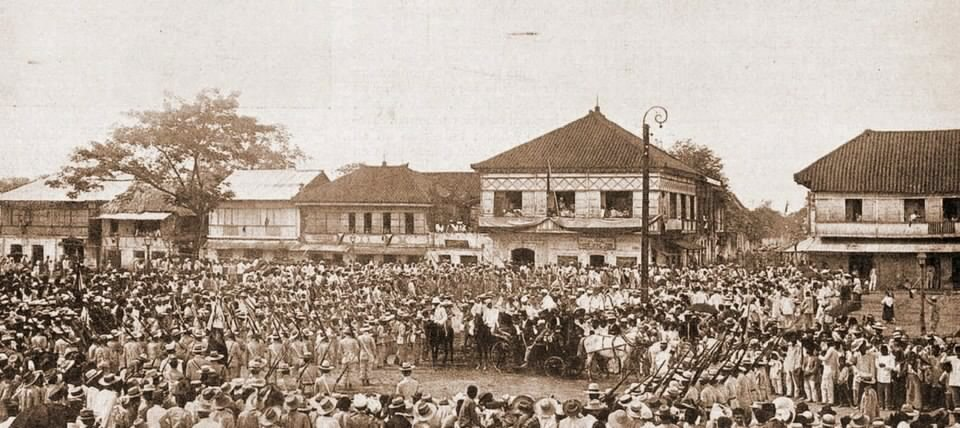
Inauguration of the First Republic

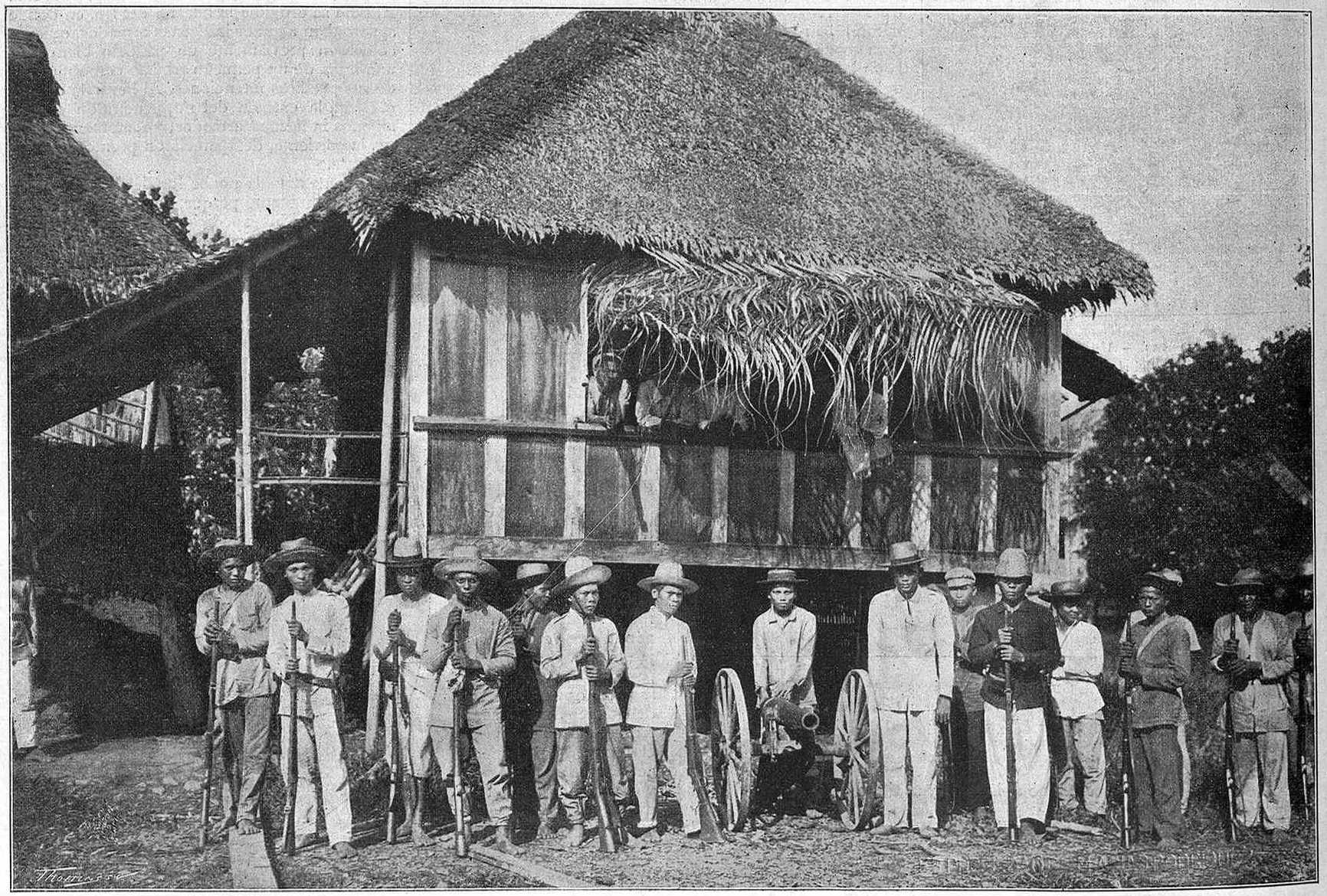
Soldiers at the Siege of Baler

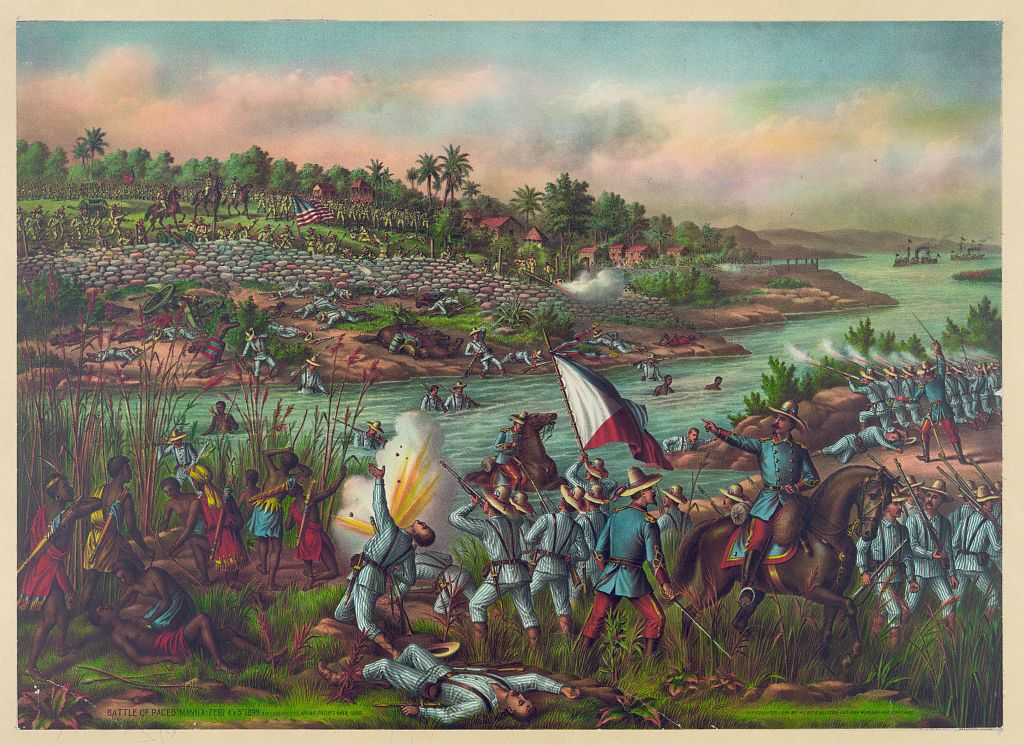
Philippine Army in the Philippine–American War, (at the battle of Paceo - 1900)

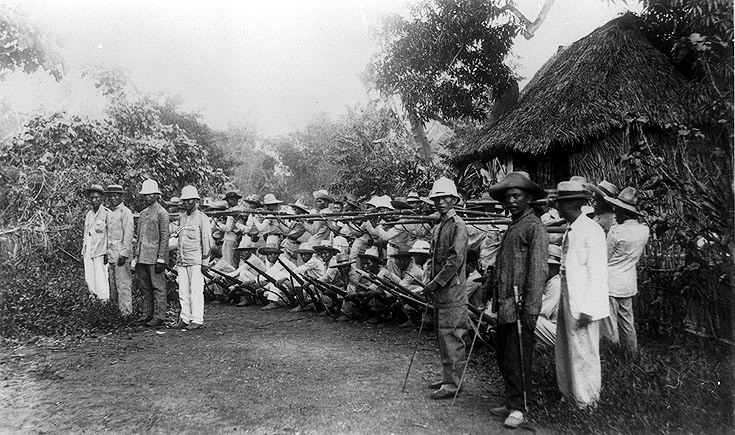
Filipino Soldiers outside Manila,1899.

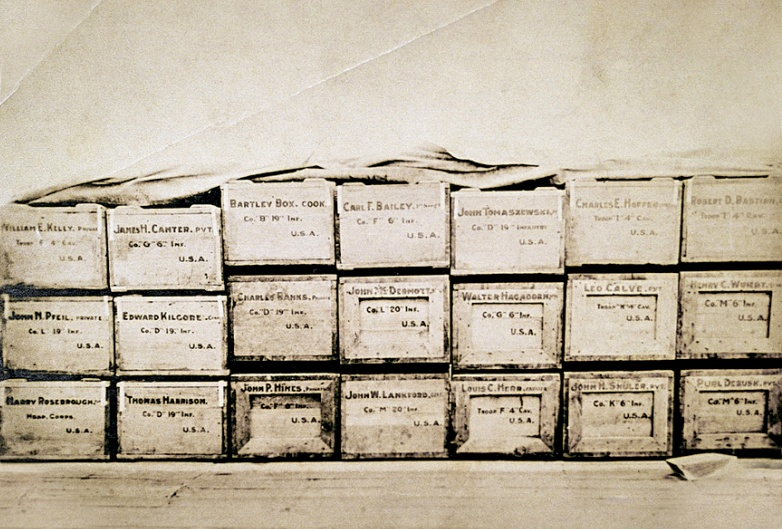
The coffins of fallen American Soldiers, (1906).

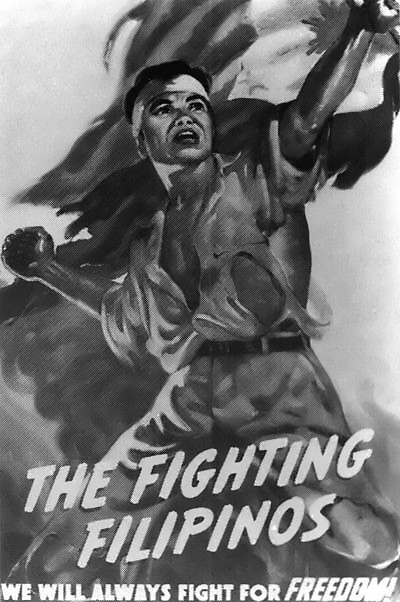
a World War II Propaganda poster of Philippine Army of its Resistance against the Japanese Invasion. (1941)

the flag of Federal Republic of Mindanao by Col. Alexander Noble, during 1990 Mindanao Crisis.

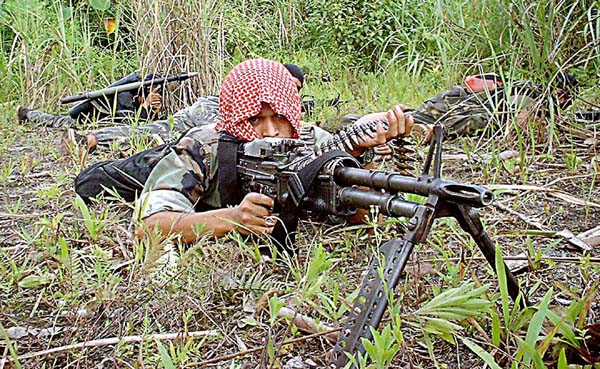
a Moro insurgent of the Islamic (Moro) insurgency at Mindanao.

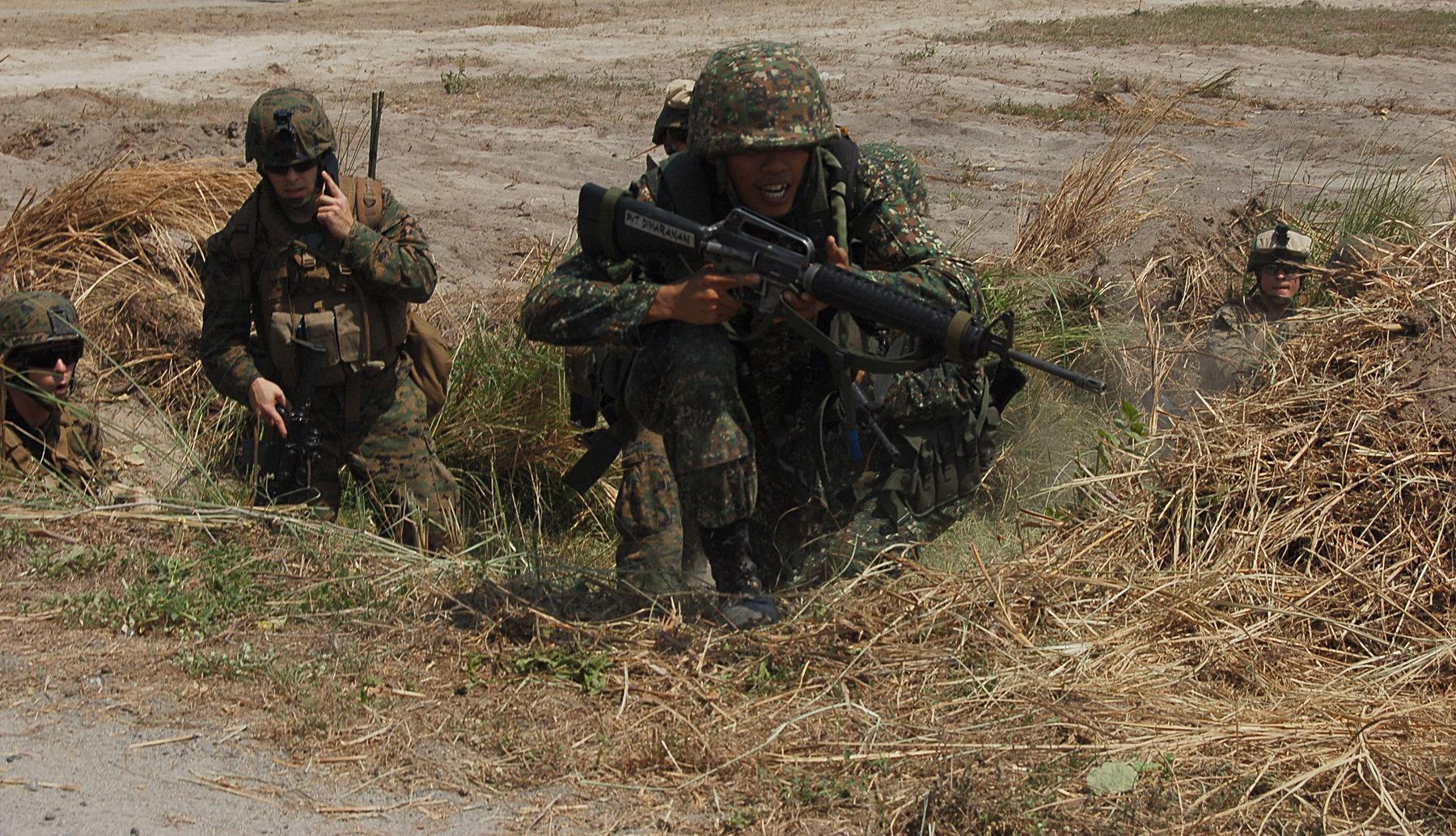
Philippine Marine Private Damaranan rushes up a small ditch to engage role-playing enemy forces while Staff Sgt. John Ross of 31st Marine Expeditionary Unit provides communication during amphibious landing training of Balikatan Exercise.

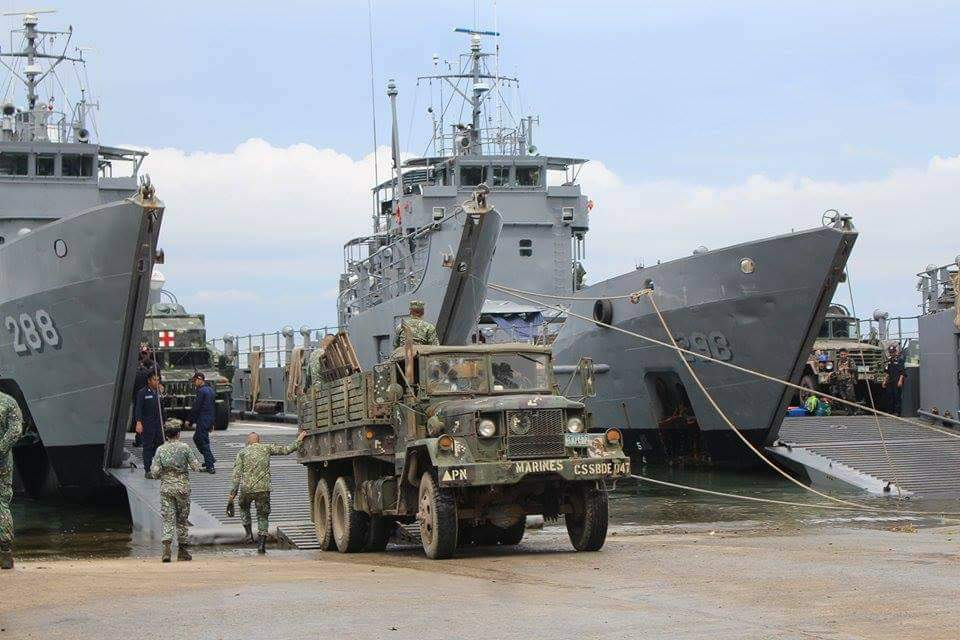
Naval Forces Western Mindanao sent off two Navy vessels to Marawi City on May 30, 2017 at Ensign Majini Pier, Naval Station Romulo Espaldon, Calarian, Zamboanga City to transport Fleet-Marine Team composed of combat service support elements, explosive ordnance and disposal units, and K9 units to augment troops that are currently fighting against local terrorist group Maute in Marawi City.

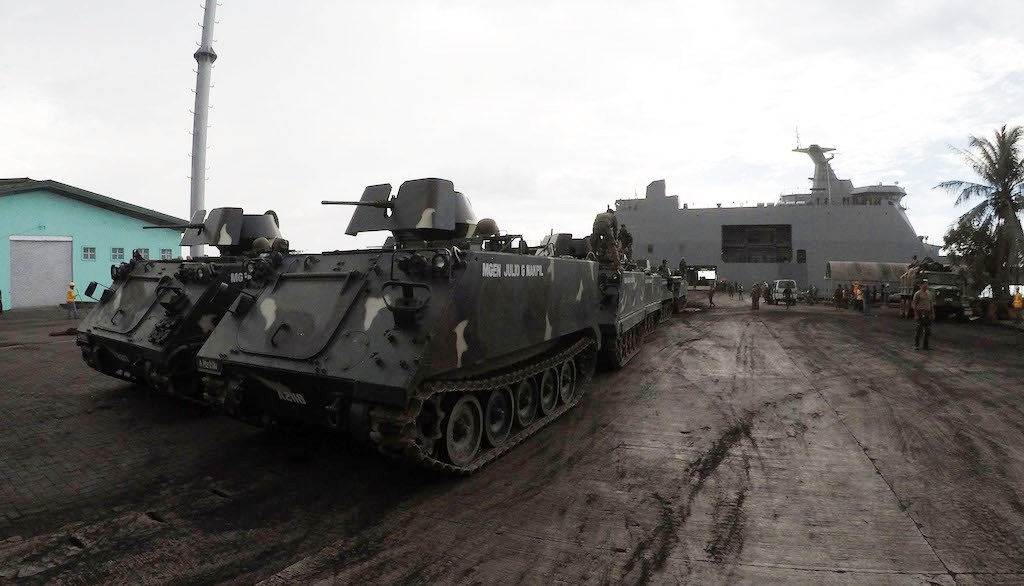
BRP Tarlac (LD-601) in Iligan offloading military units meant to augment government forces fighting in Marawi

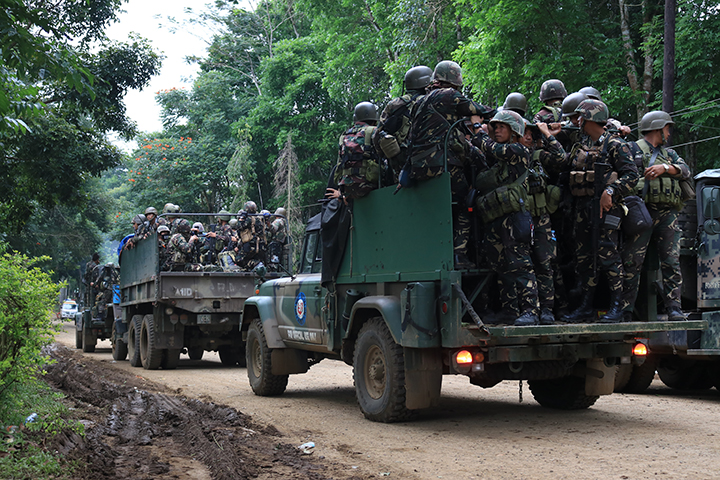
Filipino soldiers involved in the Marawi crisis.

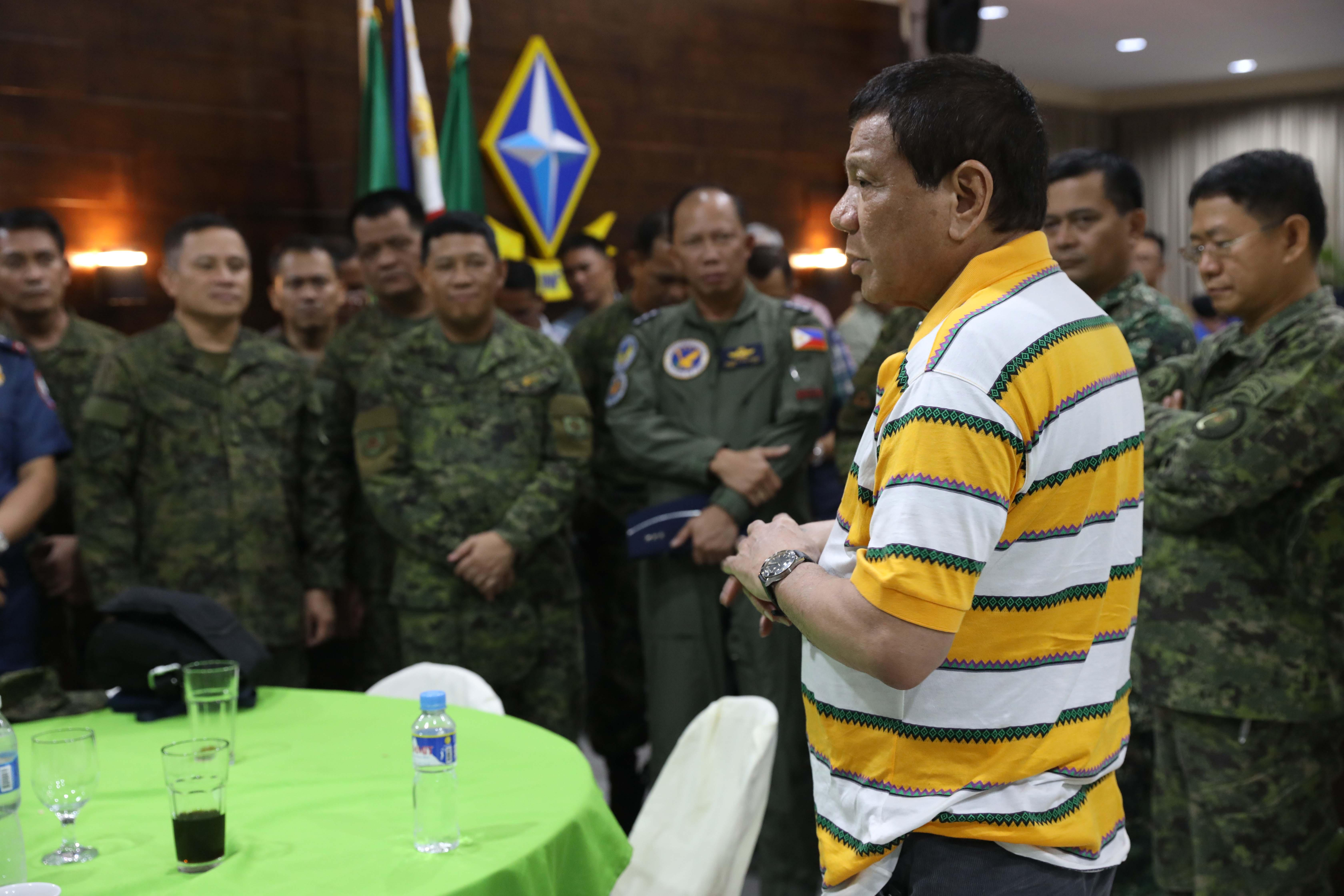
President Rodrigo Duterte talks to Troops at 4th Infantry Division HQ 6 in regards the Marawi crisis

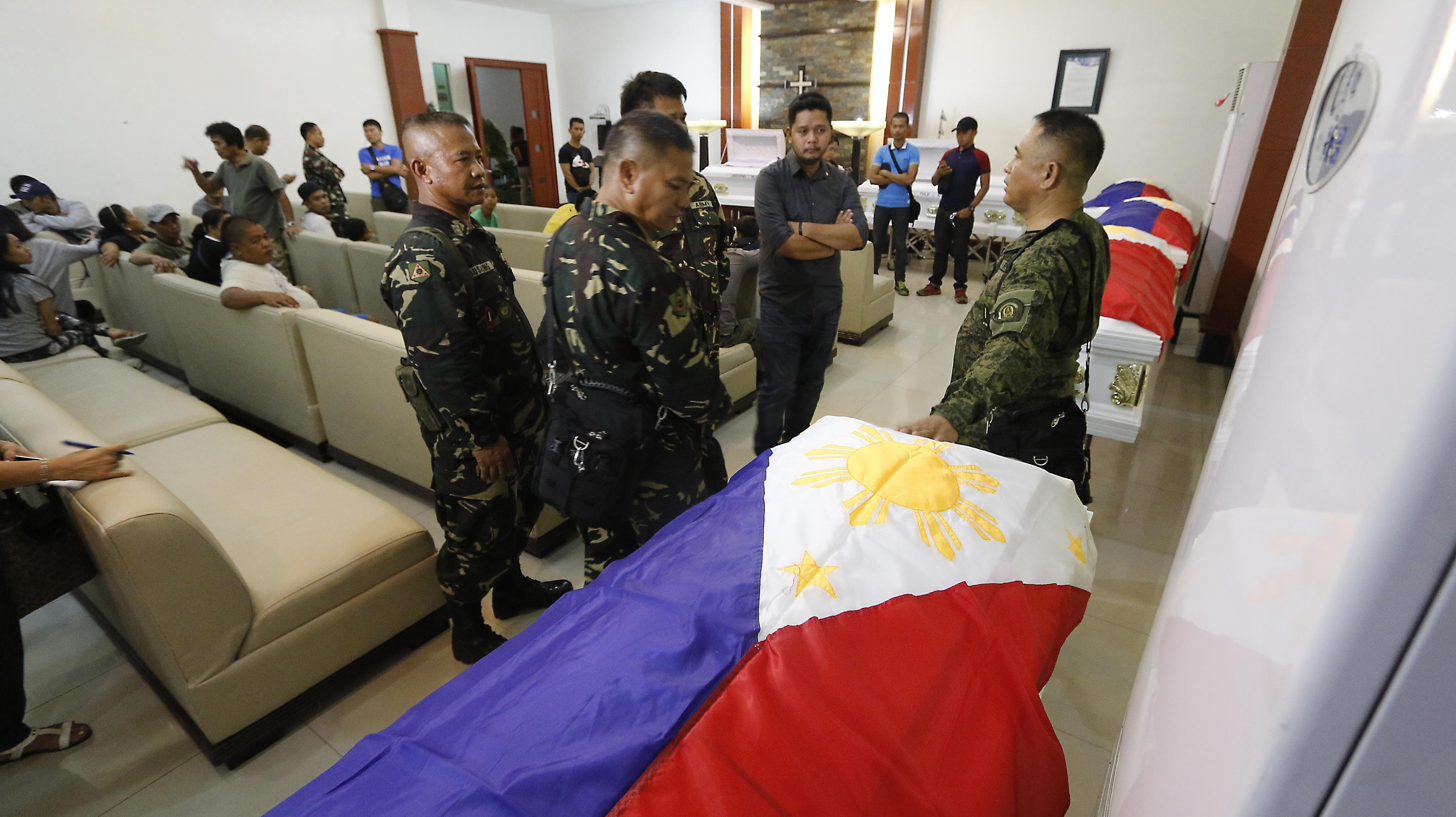
Wake of soldiers who died due to friendly fire at the Marawi crisis

== See also ==
- Military history of the Philippines
- Warfare in pre-colonial Philippines
- List of wars involving the Philippines
- Battles of the Philippines
