= Battle in the Philippines =

Battle of the Philippines may refer to several wars, military campaigns, and major battles which have been fought in the Philippine Islands, including:

- Spanish conquest
  - Battle of Bangkusay Channel
  - 1582 Cagayan battles
  - Tondo Conspiracy
  - Bankaw revolt
  - Battle of Puerto de Cavite
- Philippine revolts against Spain
- The Philippine Revolution (1896–98), called the "Tagalog War" by the Spanish, a military conflict between the people of the Philippines and the Spanish colonial authorities
  - Battle of San Mateo and Montalban
  - Battle of San Francisco de Malabon
  - Battle of San Juan del Monte
  - Kawit revolt
  - Battle of Sambat
  - Battle of Pateros
  - Battle of Camalig
  - Battles of Batangas
  - Battle of Talisay
  - Battle of Pasong Tamo
  - Battle of Imus
  - Battle of Binakayan-Dalahican
  - Battle of Kakarong de Sili
  - Battle of Perez Dasmariñas
  - Cry of Tarlac
  - Battle of Zapote Bridge (1897)
  - Battle of Calamba
  - Battle of Tayabas
  - Battle of Tres de Abril
  - Siege of Zamboanga
  - Battle of Alapan
  - Negros Revolution
- Battles of Manila (disambiguation)
- The Battle of Manila Bay (1898) during the Spanish–American War
- The Philippine–American War (1899–1902), an armed conflict between the Philippines and the United States
  - Battle of Caloocan
  - Battle of Tirad Pass
  - Battle of Santo Tomas
  - Battle of Cagayan de Misamis
  - Battle of Makahambus Hill
  - Capture of Malolos
  - Battle of Zapote River
  - Battle of Quingua
  - Battle of Calumpit
  - Battle of Olongapo
  - Battle of Pagsanjan
  - Battle of Paete
  - Battle of Santa Cruz (1899)
  - Battle of Paye
  - Battle of Mabitac
  - Battle of Pulang Lupa
  - Battle of Agusan Hill
  - Battle of Balangiga
  - Battle of Siranaya
- The Philippines campaign (1941–1942), the conquest of the Philippine Islands by the Japanese Empire during World War II in December '41 – May '42, including these significant battles:
  - The Battle of Bataan on Luzon Island
  - The Battle of Corregidor of 1942 on Corregidor Island in Manila Bay
  - Japanese invasion of Davao
- The Philippines campaign (1944–1945), the long American and Filipino land, sea, and aviation campaigns of October '44 through August '45. Major battles in this campaign included:
  - Battle of the Philippine Sea
  - Raid at Cabanatuan
  - The U.S. Army's and Philippine Army's Battle of Leyte (October – November '44)
  - The Naval Battle of Leyte Gulf (October '44)
  - The Naval Battle of Surigao Strait (October '44)
  - The Naval Battle off Samar (October '44)
  - Battle of Bessang Pass
  - The U.S. Army's and Philippine Army's Battle of Mindoro
  - The U.S. Army's Invasion of Lingayen Gulf (January '45)
  - The U.S. Army's and Philippine Army's Battle of Luzon
  - The Battle of Corregidor (1945) on Corregidor Island in Manila Bay
  - The U.S. Army's and Philippine Army's Battle of Manila (1945)
  - The U.S. Army's and Philippine Army's Battle of the Visayas
  - The U.S. Army's and Philippine Army's Battle of Mindanao
  - Battle of Davao
  - Invasion of Palawan
- Zamboanga Siege 2013
- 2017 Bohol clashes
- The Battle of Marawi May-October 2017
