= Battle of Manila =

Battle of Manila may refer to:

== Land battles ==
- Battle of Manila (1304), Hindu forces from Pon-i invade local Animists
- Battle of Manila (1365), Hindu-Buddhist Shivaists from Majapahit invades Manila and its Pon-i alllies
- Battle of Manila (1500), Muslim forces from the Brunei Sultanate versus Native Hindus from the Tondo Rajahnate
- Battle of Manila (1570), Spanish forces from Mexico versus Muslims from Brunei
- Battle of Manila (1574), Chinese Pirate Warlord "Limahong" versus the Spanish
- Battle of Manila (1603), First Chinese revolt ending in massacre, triggered by a suspicious visit of Chinese Imperial officials to Manila
- Battle of Manila (1639), Large labor uprising by Chinese opposing forced resettlement ending in their mass murder
- Battle of Manila (1762), which saw the British take control of Manila during the Seven Years' War
- Battle of Manila (1769), Brunei Sultanate temporarily attacks British Occupied Philippines
- Raid on Manila (1798), a British reconnaissance operation during French Revolutionary Wars
- Battle of Manila (1823), soldiers from Latin America: Mexico, Colombia, Venezuela, Peru, Chile, Argentina, & Costa Rica, join Andrés Novales in a revolt against Spain
- Battle of Manila (1896), a battle which involved Filipino Revolutionaries against the Spanish forces during the Philippine Revolution
- Battle of Manila (1898), involving United States forces and Filipino Revolutionaries versus the Spanish during the Spanish–American War
- Battle of Manila (1899), involving Filipino forces versus the United States during the Philippine–American War
- Battle of Manila (1945), the Liberation of Manila from Japan during World War II

== Naval battles ==
- Battles of La Naval de Manila (1646)
- Battle of Manila Bay (1898)

== See also ==
- Battle of Bangkusay Channel (1571)
- Battle of the Philippines (disambiguation)
- Philippine revolts against Spain
