= Battle of Talisay =

- Part of the Philippine Revolution
Date	12–15 October 1896
Location	Talisay, Batangas, Philippines
Result	Filipino victory

Belligerents
Katipunan: Magdalo; Magdiwang	Spanish Empire: Guardia Civil

Commanders and leaders
Emilio Aguinaldo; Miguel Malvar; Candido Tirona	Ramón Blanco

Strength
11,000 irregulars and bolomen	1,900 regulars and skirmishers

Casualties and losses
~400 Spanish claim	~240 Spanish claim

The Battle of Talisay in Batangas province, Philippines, was fought during the Philippine Revolution on October 12, 1896, that led to Filipino victory.

== Background ==
The Filipinos, by the time the revolution began, Batangas was already a hotspot for revolutionary activities, and as a consequent result it was one of the first provinces that declared independence from Spain and joined the Katipunan. The Spanish then conducted offensives against Filipino rebel encampments in the province but failed.

== Battle ==
General Emilio Aguinaldo was already winning battles in Cavite province, and had begun amassing huge throngs of men willing to join the Katipunan. Then he went along with a huge force to Batangas to join with generals Miguel Malvar and Candido Tirona to amass more men in the province to join the revolution. The Spanish fought hard, but one entire company of theirs was completely destroyed. As a result, the revolutionaries led by General Emilio Aguinaldo overran the Spanish positions stationed at Talisay, after the victory, people continued to join with the revolutionary army of General Aguinaldo, which he left in Cavite that was assigned for the meantime to Katipunero generals including Santiago Alvarez to continue the revolution there.

== Aftermath ==
To follow up victory, General Malvar then launched a simultaneous attack in the towns of Lemery, Bayungyungan, Calaca, and Taal in the same province, but after suffering heavy losses, called off the attacks. However, the effect of the battle also prevented the afterwards severely weakened Spanish units in the province to help quell the ongoing revolution in Cavite.
