= Pon-i Conquest of Manila (1304) =

Boni was as a polity located along the northwestern coast of Borneo that appeared in Chinese historical records from the 10th to the 14th centuries. While historians debate whether its location was located in Brunei or Santubong, 14th-century sources associate Boni with Brunei as it emerged as the dominant trading power in the region. At the peak of his rule in the early 14th century, Boni is a polity which rule few area, including Manila.

== History ==
While most scholars agree that Boni, which was mentioned in 10th-century Chinese sources was located on the northwestern coast of Borneo, there is no consensus on its exact location. Some researchers place the polity in Brunei based on local archaeological findings, whereas others point to equally strong archaeological evidence indicating that it was located in Santubong. Although 10th-century Chinese sources do not exactly mention Boni as Brunei, fourteenth-century chinese source is believed was specifically refer Boni as Brunei because Antonio Pigafetta mentioned in his account that in mid fourteenh century, all polity is in decline except Brunei which is located in Kota Batu as the dominant polity in the area. Other than literature references, there is finding of two ancient tombstones discovered in Brunei which supported the relationship of Brunei and Chinese trading port in Quanzhou.

The first tombstone is a granite tombstone of a Muslim named Master Pu from around 1264 during the Southern Song dynasty, which was possibly engraved in Quanzhou before being shipped to Brunei. A few scholars identified Master Pu on the tombstone as Pu Zongmin, who was related to a diplomatic mission to Boni sent by the Chinese court. However, Johannes L. Kurz, a Brunei historian, refuted this claim because the only evidence stating the relationship between the two identities, the Xishan zazhi, is not strong evidence.The claim that the Xishan zazhi is not strong evidence comes from Kurz's opinion that the document only appeared in the early 1980s.

The second is an undated tombstone belonging to "Maharaja Bruni," which is carved from diabase, which is identified as not coming from the area, and is also believed to have been crafted in Quanzhou. The stone is also inscribed in Arabic rather than Jawi, with dating around 1301 through palaeographic analysis.

Boni had rule Manila with name Malilu 麻裏蘆 and other region include Sarawak and Sabah, as well as the Philippine kingdoms of: Butuan, Sulu, Ma-i(Mindoro or Laguna), Shahuchong 沙胡重 (present-day Zamboanga), Yachen 啞陳 (Oton), and 文杜陵 Wenduling (present-day Mindanao, Bintulu or Mindoro).
