= Battle of Sambat =

Battle of Sambat Revolution in Laguna
- Part of the Philippine Revolution
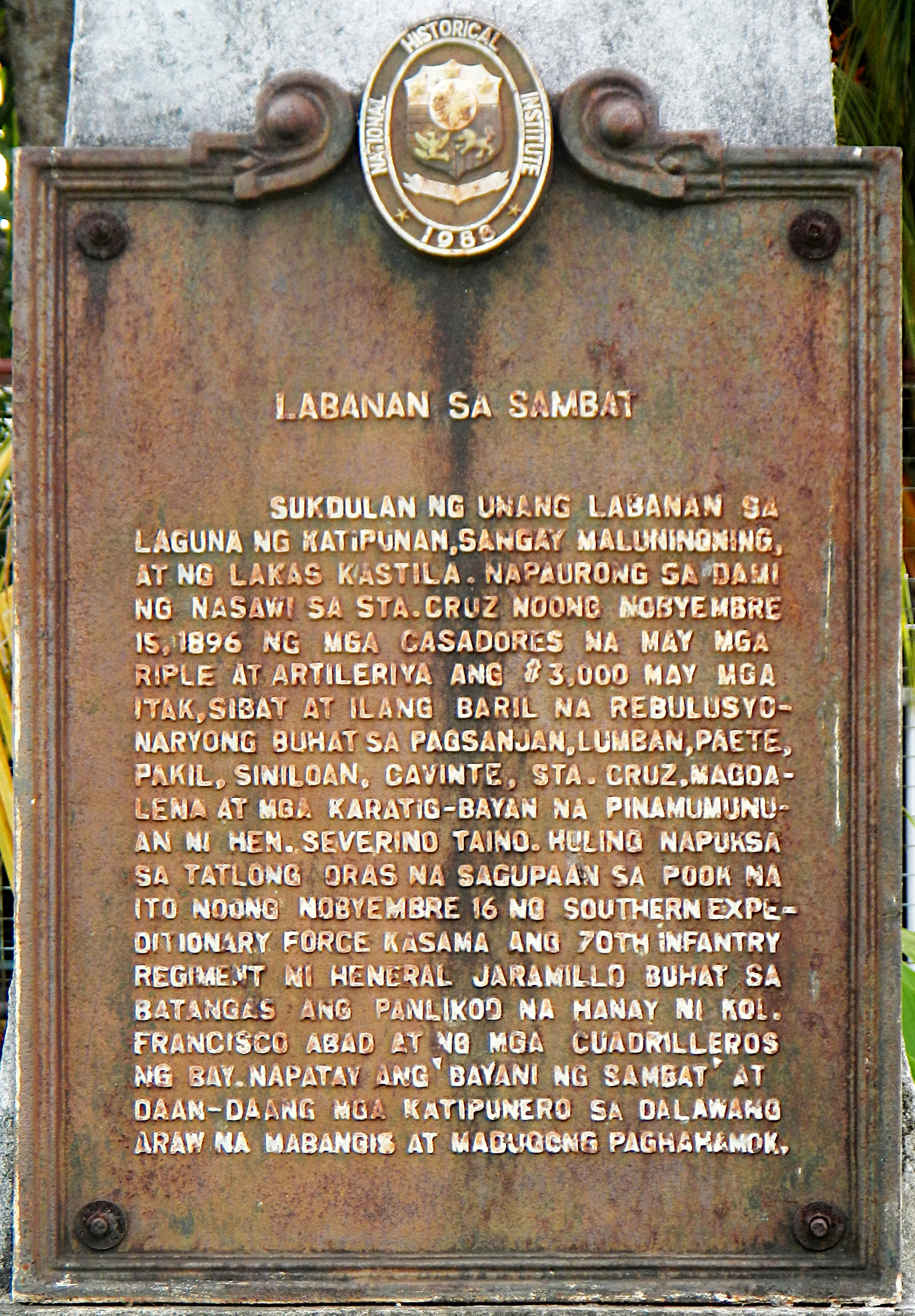
- Historical Marker at the site of the battle, Pagsanjan, Laguna
Date	November 15–16, 1896
Location	Pagsanjan, Laguna, Philippines
Result	Spanish victory: Defeat of Maluningning Katipunan Chapter.

Belligerents
Katipunan: Maluningning	Spanish Empire

Commanders and leaders
Severino Taino; Francisco Abad †	Nicolas Jaramillo

Strength
3,000 irregulars and rebels	1 Detachment of cazadores

Casualties and losses
Heavy	Light

The Battle of Sambat (Filipino: Labanan sa Sambat, Spanish: Batalla de Sambat) was the culminating battle of the first revolts of the Katipunan in Laguna. The battle was the final major action for the Katipunan chapter of "Maluningning" ending in the defeat of the rebels and martial law in Laguna province.

== Background ==
After centuries of Spanish colonial rule, resentment towards the colonists, particularly the Dominican friars who owned much of the farmland in Laguna province, grew and grew with colonial and clerical powers abusing their powers and punishing the tenants of the farmlands if they refused to pay their dues. A good example of this is the eviction of the Rizal clan from Calamba town after their struggles with their Dominican tenants. José Rizal, national hero of the Philippines wrote about such issues in his 2 great novels, Noli me tangere, and El filibusterismo. The latter called for a revolution urgently. the call of revolt was answered by the Katipunan secret society. Established by Andres Bonifacio in Manila, within a few years, Katipunero chapters were opened in the surrounding provinces with the Katipunan chapter "Maluningning" established in Pagsanjan on December 12, 1894, by Severino Taiño. Members came over from Lumban, Paete, Pakil, Siniloan, Cavinti, Santa Cruz, Magdalena and other towns even from Tayabas province.

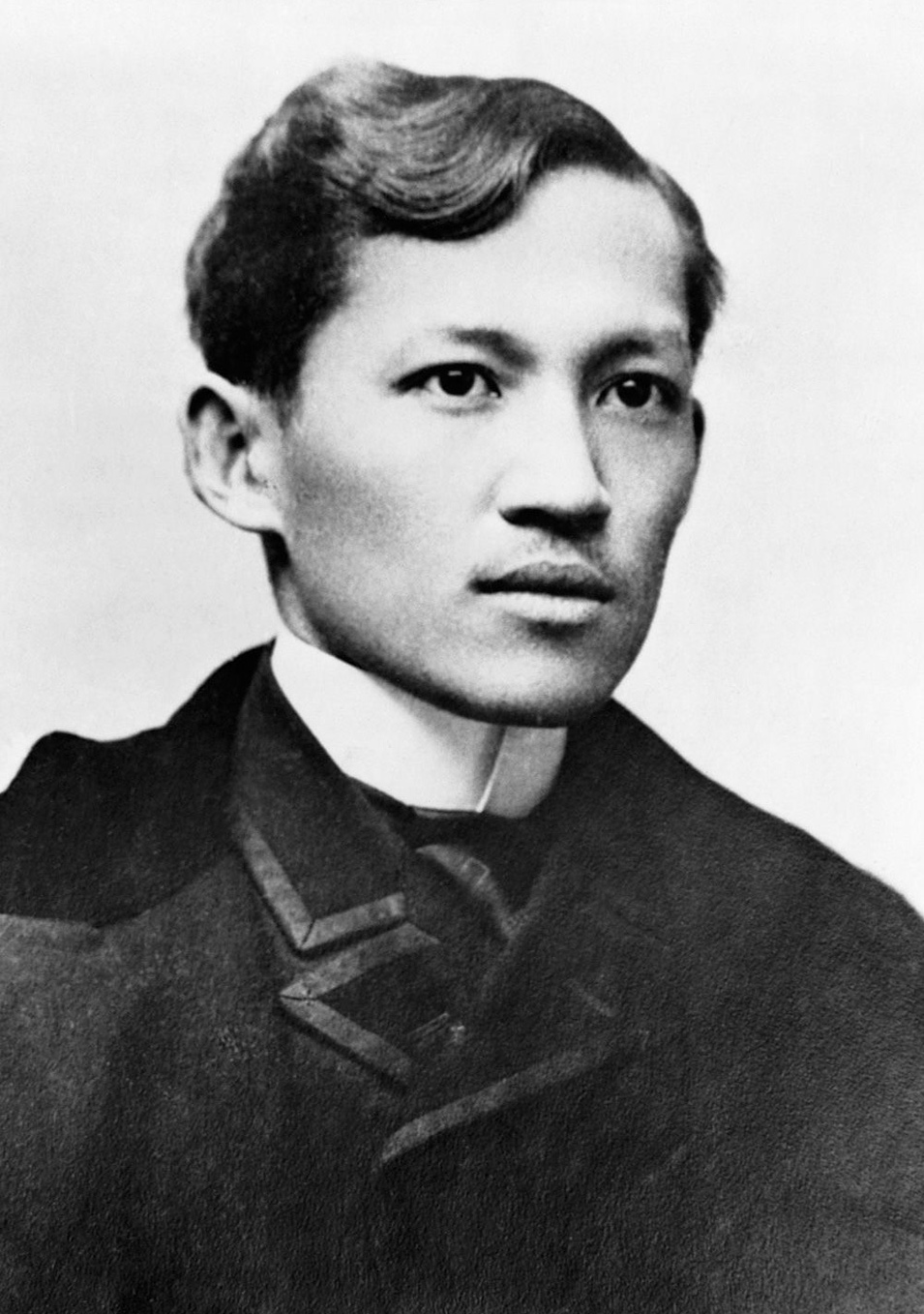
Jose Rizal, Philippine national hero was a native of Laguna province

=== The Revolution ===
In August 1896, the Katipunan was discovered by Spanish authorities, hostilities soon flared and simultaneous uprisings occurred in Cavite, Manila, Tarlac, Pampanga, Bulacan, Batangas, Nueva Ecija, and Laguna. Such that these 8 provinces were placed under martial law by Governor Ramon Blanco. The Katipuneros of Laguna were forced to meet up and plan their revolution in even more secluded areas. One famous site of Katipunan meetings is the Nagcarlan Underground Cemetery.

== Start of the revolt ==
Laguna's revolutionaries initiated actual hostilities late in the year, choosing Severino Taino as their commander, they began their revolt by assaulting their respective towns in the hopes of getting arms from the local garrisons of Guardia Civil as well as to recruit rebels from the native garrisons under the Spanish army. The attacks on the Laguna towns of Lumban, Paete, Pakil, Siniloan, Cavinti, Santa Cruz, Magdalena and Pagsanjan were tactically successful in gaining arms and recruiting the cuadrilleros or local native police of each town. However, no strategic points were captured and the army of Laguna remained a guerrilla force. By the time General Taino organized his volunteers he had with him, over 3,000 men from all over Laguna and Tayabas provinces, the arms they had taken from the Spaniards proved hopelessly insufficient, however, it was now or never for the revolutionaries who intended an attack on the major town of Santa Cruz.

=== Attack on Santa Cruz ===
The attack on Santa Cruz was initiated on November 15, 1896 with general Taino attacking the Casa Real and the Church and convent of Santa Cruz, the detachment of cazadores and infanterias had been reinforced by the arrival of General Nicolas Jaramillo, put in command of the zone of Laguna by Gov. Blanco. The 3,000 Katipuneros armed with very few guns, with mostly spears and Bolo knives faced a numerically reinforced and technologically superior Spanish force armed with Remington and Mauser rifles, as well as some Artillery. Unsurprisingly, the attack failed with the Katipuneros taking heavy casualties.

=== Defending Pagsanjan ===
Severino Taino and his army retreated to the crossroads near the Barrio of Sambat in Pagsanjan. This was his de facto capital and base, realizing the Spaniards' intention to strike his positions here, he took to defending the crossroads of Sambat with the remainder of his army, with his rear guard of cuadrilleros under Colonel Francisco Abad. The following day, November 16, saw the Spanish cazadores clash with the rebels. the beleaguered and morale-depleted rebels were rallied one last time by Colonel Abad and as the charged at the cazadores, Abad was shot and killed, falling from his horse. After 3 hours of fierce hand-to-hand combat, the rebels were reduced and General Taino no longer had enough men to fight the Spaniards in battle, he shifted to guerrilla warfare with the remainder of his once massive rebel army. The Spaniards began their persecution and arrest of suspected rebels throughout the province the following weeks.

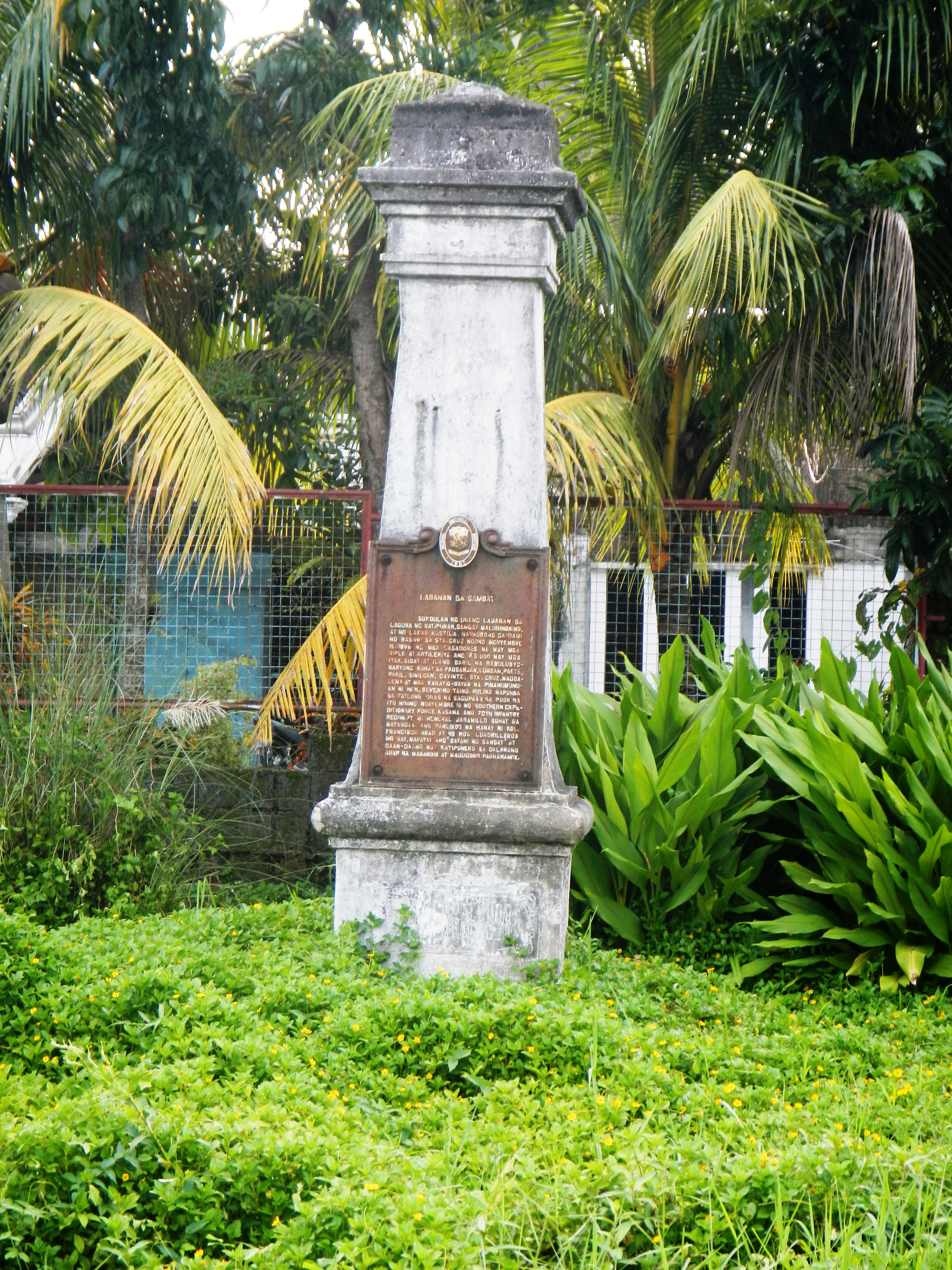
Site of the battle of Sambat

== Aftermath ==
The revolt ended the chances of the Katipuneros initiating further hostilities against the Spaniards, reducing their war to one of attrition and hit-and-run attacks. This was the case for most of the revolution at this point in time, save for the revolution in Cavite which saw the entire province liberated. Cavite was seen by many Tagalogs as a refuge from the suffocating martial law of their home provinces. The persecuted Lagunenos civilian and partisan, began travelling in droves, in a massive exodus towards independent Cavite, bringing with them their town bands, patron saints and banners. The relative quiet of hostilities helped these people travel easier towards Cavite in what was to be called "Ang Panahon ng Tagalog" or the Tagalog Age. However, with the Spaniards executing Jose Rizal in Manila on December 30, 1896, the revolt soon flared up once more.

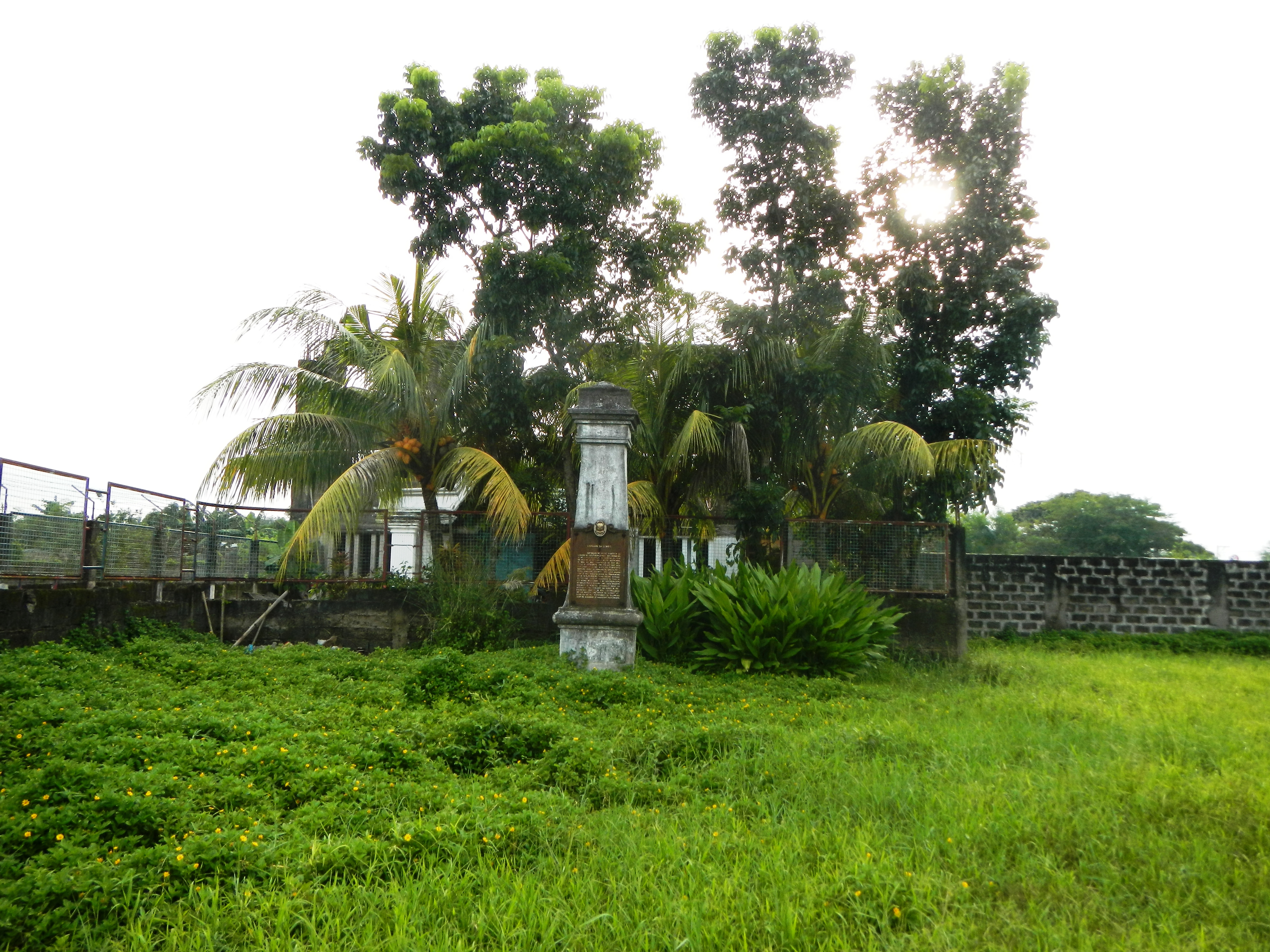
