= George M. Jones =

United States Army general

George Madison Jones
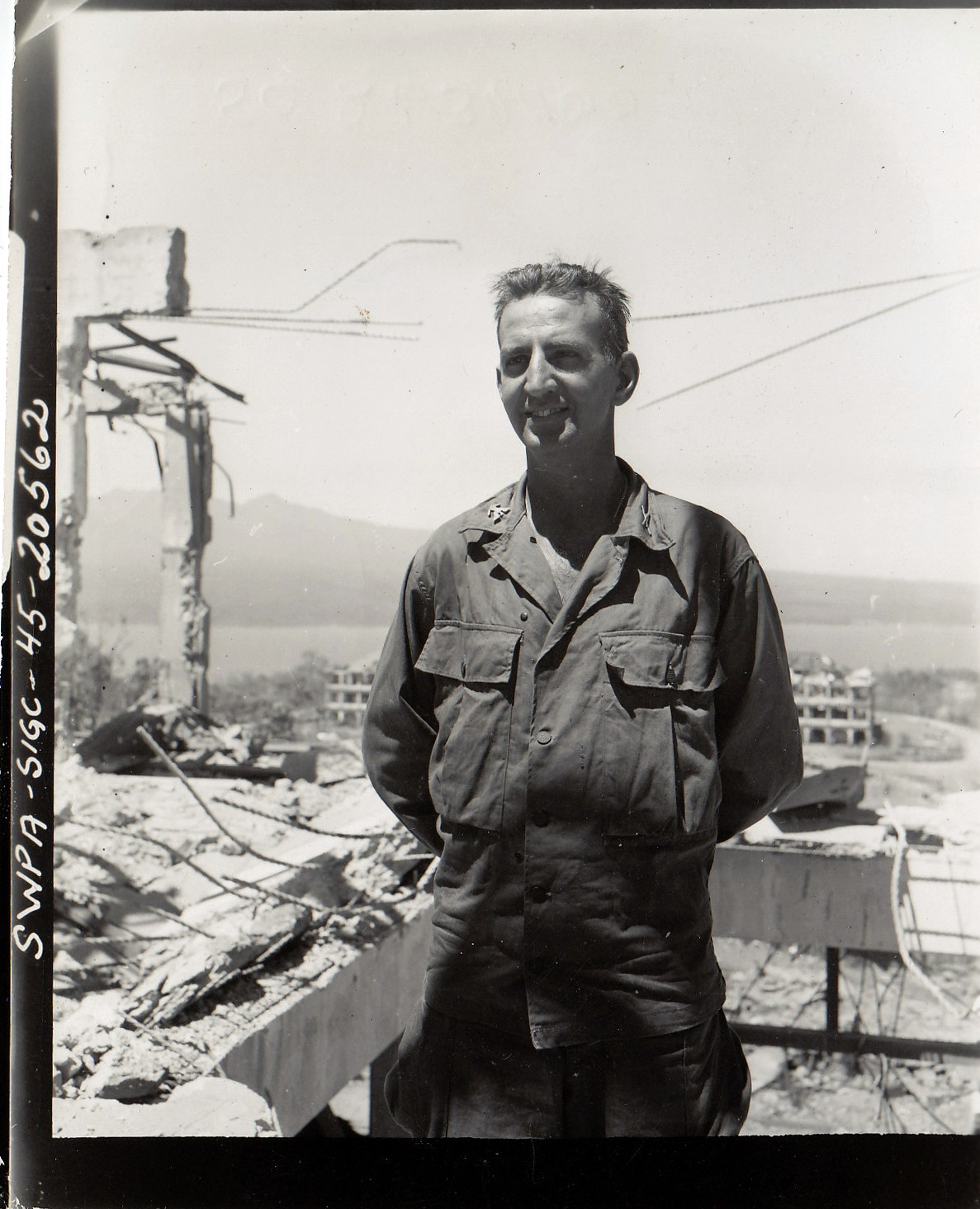
- George M. Jones as a Colonel during the Philippines Campaign (1944–45).
- Born: February 22, 1911
- Died: December 16, 1995 (aged 84)
- Education: United States Military Academy Class of 1935
- Military career
- Allegiance: United States of America
- Branch: United States Army
- Service years: 1935 – 1968
- Rank: Brigadier General
- Commands: 503rd Parachute Infantry Regiment
- Conflicts: World War II; Korean War; Cold War
- Awards: Distinguished Service Cross; Distinguished Service Medal; Silver Star

George Madison Jones (February 22, 1911 - December 16, 1995) was a United States Army brigadier general most notable for leading the 503rd Parachute Infantry Regiment in World War II.

== Military career ==
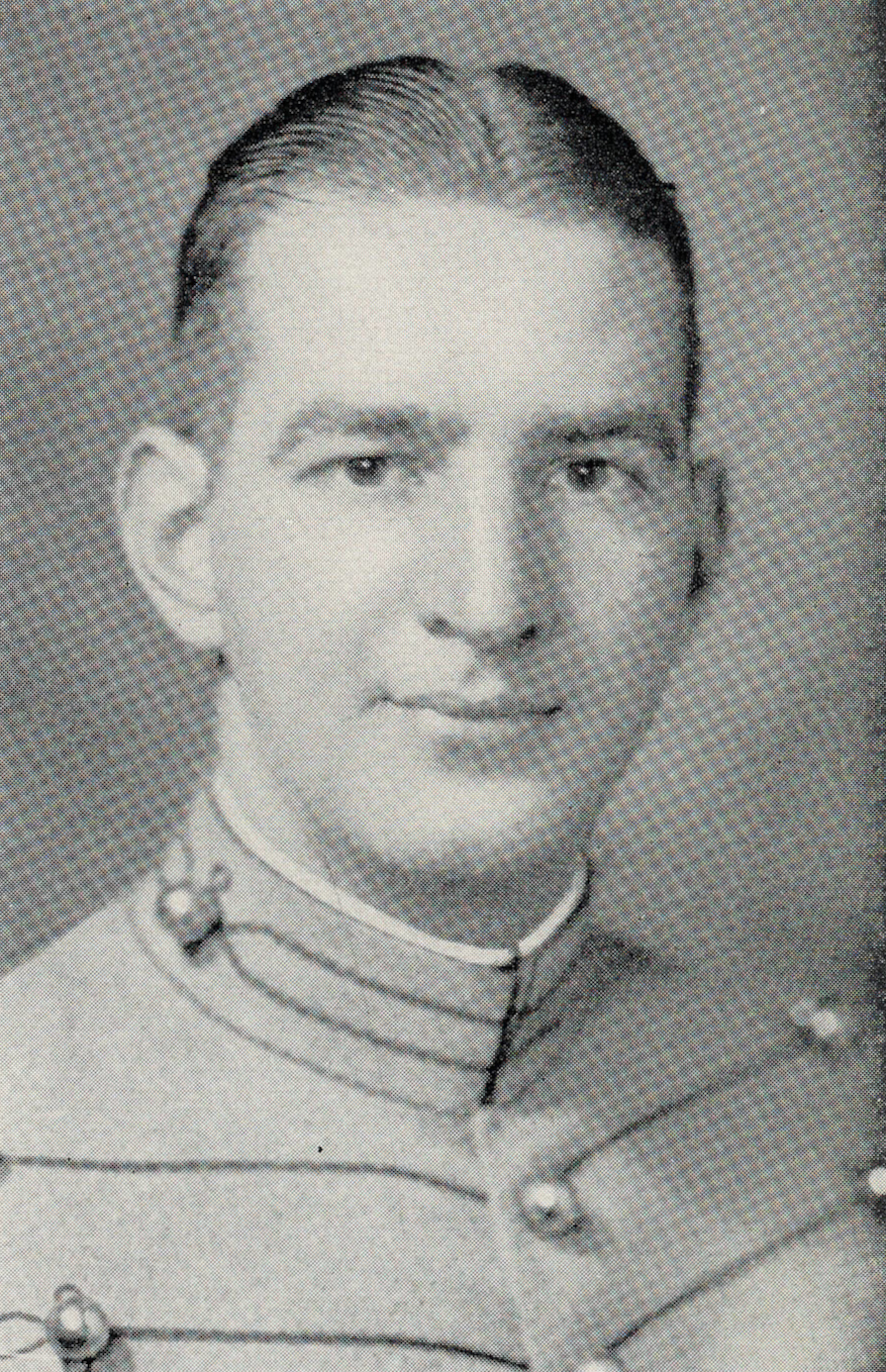
Jones as a West Point cadet in 1935

Jones graduated from the United States Military Academy in 1935 (graduate #10439) and was commissioned into the infantry. After a number of infantry assignments he volunteered for parachute training just after the establishment of the Parachute School at Fort Benning, Georgia. After graduation, he was assigned to the Canal Zone, where he commanded the 501st Parachute Battalion, one of the original parachute units.

At the outbreak of World War II, the battalion joined the 503rd Parachute Infantry Regiment, the only independent airborne regiment in the Pacific Theatre, to act as a strategic reserve for General MacArthur. The 503rd was sent to Australia, where Lieutenant Colonel Jones served as the Regimental Executive Officer to Colonel Kinsler, the Regimental Commanding Officer. From Australia, Jones and the 503rd went to New Guinea, where they made the first successful U.S. combat parachute assault in the war at Markham Valley in September 1943. (The 511th Parachute Infantry Regiment of the 11th Airborne Division was also in New Guinea and made combat jumps in the Philippines during the war.) Upon Kinsler's questionable suicide, Jones became Regimental Commander and was promoted to colonel.

After making a second combat jump on Noemfoor Island in July 1944 and leaving New Guinea, the 503rd participated in the invasion of the Philippine Islands and conducted an amphibious landing on Mindoro in December 1944. Jones was put in charge of "Rock Force" (503rd PRCT plus 3rd Battalion, 34th U.S. Infantry) which liberated Corregidor Island by a combined parachute assault and amphibious landing in February 1945. Jones and his Regimental Combat Team moved on to Negros Island, where they fought Imperial Marines and other Japanese forces until well after October 1945, as a core of Japanese commanders refused to surrender. After the last Japanese units surrendered, the 503rd was disbanded and he took the Headquarters back to California, where the unit was officially deactivated and the colors cased.

After World War II, Jones would serve in the U.S. Army for another 23 years. Notable positions included Chief of Staff of XVIII Airborne Corps, and Operations Officer (G-3) of IX Corps in Korea. He was the second Commandant of the Special Warfare School at Fort Bragg, North Carolina, where he is credited with transforming Special Forces from a concept to an effective fighting organization. He subsequently commanded the 66th Military Intelligence Group in Germany, served as Deputy Commanding General of the 3rd Infantry Division, and was Chief of Staff of the Fifth US Army. He ultimately served as Commander of the Yukon Command and Deputy Commander of US Army - Alaska before retiring with the rank of brigadier general in 1968.

== Medals and decorations ==
Combat Infantryman Badge
Parachutist Badge

Distinguished Service Cross
Army Distinguished Service Medal
Silver Star
Legion of Merit with one Oak Leaf Cluster
Bronze Star Medal with one Oak Leaf Cluster
Joint Service Commendation Medal
Air Medal
Presidential Unit Citation
American Defense Service Medal
American Campaign Medal
Asiatic-Pacific Campaign Medal with four service stars
World War II Victory Medal
Army of Occupation Medal
National Defense Service Medal with one Oak Leaf Cluster
Korean Service Medal with two service stars
Philippine Liberation Medal with two stars
United Nations Korea Medal
