= Battle of Taraca =

- Part of Philippine–American War
Date	April 1904
Location	Lanao, Philippines
Result	American victory

Belligerents
United States	Confederate States of Lanao

Commanders and leaders
Leonard Wood	Unknown

Casualties and losses
2 killed 8 wounded	Unknown

The Battle of Taraca was fought in what is now Taraka, Lanao del Sur in the Philippines between the Moro people of Mindanao and the United States during the Philippine–American War. General Leonard Wood invited the region's datus to a peace conference, but the Sultan of Taraca, refused to attend. The Taraca River Valley was where most of the Lake Lanao Moros lived, the home of Datu Ampuanagus and Datu Duli the most daring warrior

Wood sent two infantry battalions and two cavalry troops to the mouth of the Taraca River. Colonel Marion P. Maus' Third Battalion of the 22nd Infantry held the mouth of the river while Wood led a column overland. Maus' men used a Vickers-Maxim machine gun and a Gatling gun to capture a few cottas, inflicting 65 casualties on the Moros. Over the next week, Wood's men destroyed 130 cottas but failed to capture the Sultan.
