= Majapahit conquest of Manila (1365) =

14th century expedition assault

Battle of Manila (1365)
| Date | 1365 |
| Location | Manila, Philippines |
| Result | Disputed |

Belligerents
| Tondo Kingdom | Majapahit Empire |

Commanders and leaders
| Unknown | Unknown |

The Majapahit conquest of Manila (1365) was a contested invasion of Manila, then allegedly called Selurong, by the Hindu-Buddhist Shivaist Majapahit Empire. Several scholars are arguing over the veracity of the fact that the Selurong stated in the records, referred to have been captured by the Majapahit Empire, was the kingdom of Manila as Selurong was also a Malay royal name for Manila, or instead, referred to the Serudong river in Brunei.

== Earliest mention of a Majaphit ruled Manila ==
According to Mariano A. Henson's genealogical research (later brought up by Majul in 1973, and by Santiago in 1990) a settlement in the Maynila area already existed by the year 1258. This settlement was ruled by "Rajah Avirjirkaya" whom Henson described as a "Majapahit Suzerain".

According to Henson, this settlement was attacked by a Bruneian commander named Rajah Ahmad, who defeated Avirjirkaya and established Maynila as a "Muslim principality".

== Maynila as Saludang/Selurong ==
In the 14th century, according to the epic eulogy poem Nagarakretagama, which was dedicated to Maharaja Hayam Wuruk of the Majapahit, a place called "Saludang", also called "Seludong" or "Selurung" was listed in Canto 14 alongside "Sulot" and "Kalka" as its territories.

The idea of Maynila being "Saludang", along with "Sulot" being identified with Sulu, was first mentioned in a book by Cesar A. Majul titled Muslims in the Philippines (1973), stating:

"Brunei Sultan Bulkeiah (Nakhoda Ragam), who "was the Rajah who conquered the kingdom of Soolook and made a dependency of the country of Selurong, the Rajah of which was called DATOH GAMBAN", according to the Brunei Selesilah. Now, according to Brunei tradition, Selurong is said to be "in the island of Luzon and the site of the present town of Manila".

Many other scholars, such as William Henry Scott (1994) and Mohammed Jamil Al-Sufri (2000), acknowledged the theory of Maynila as Selurong/Saludang. Scott noted that "according to Bruneian folk history", [ ] "Manila was probably founded as a Bornean trading colony about 1500, with a royal prince marrying into the local ruling family."

In the original Selesilah however,Datu Imam Aminuddin mentions:

"... and the Sultan begot Sultan Bolkiah, who fought a war with the people of Sulu and defeated the kingdoms of Sulu and Seludang whose ruler was Datu Gamban. Sultan Bolkiah was also named by the elders as 'Nakhoda Ragam'. He married Princess Lela Manjani (Menchanai)."

French linguist Jean-Paul Potet notes that "According to some, Luzon and Manila would have been called Seludong or Selurong by the Malays of Brunei before the Spanish conquest (Cebu 1565, Manila 1571)." However, Potet also points out that "there is no text to support this claim. Conversely, Borneo has a mountain site called Seludong." Saunders (1994) meanwhile suggests that Saludang or Seludang is located on the Serudong River in eastern Sabah.
