= Cry of Tarlac =

- Part of the Philippine Revolution
| Date | January 24, 1897 |
| Location | La Paz, Tarlac |
| Result | Filipino victory |

Belligerents
| Katipunan | (Spain) Spanish Empire |

Commanders and leaders
| Francisco Macabulos | (Spain) Unknown |

Strength
| Unknown | Unknown |

Casualties and losses
| Unknown | Unknown |

The Cry of Tarlac (Filipino: Sigaw sa Tarlac, Spanish: Gritos de Tarlac) was an uprising led by General Francisco Macabulos in La Paz, Tarlac in January 1897. Although the province of Tarlac was already classified to be in a state of rebellion even before the uprising, major hostilities unfolded after the cry.

== Background ==
The previous year, eight provinces were put under martial law by the Spanish government in Manila. The eight rays of the Sun on the Philippine flag represent these eight provinces including the province of Tarlac, which had a revolutionary chapter of the Katipunan established by Ladislao Diwa. After the Cry of Pugad Lawin and the later Cry of Nueva Ecija in September, the Spanish government began sending troops to the revolted provinces and local militias from the Visayan islands helped quell the insurrection in central Luzon, however, the main revolutionaries from the area, Mariano Llanera and Manuel Tinio continued a guerilla war up until early January 1897. By that time, the Tarlaqueno revolutionaries were already preparing a major offensive to support the central Luzon revolutionaries.

== Macabulos as "Caudillo" ==
As early as 1895, Francisco Macabulos had already begun recruiting members for the Tarlac chapter of the Katipunan, many of these members were from the "principalia" or educated class such as Don Aurello Pineda, Don Marciano Barrera, who organized farmers and laborers into militias and Dona Justa Valeriano de Urquico the "Heroine of the revolution in Tarlac". Macabulos, a poet and playwright was chosen to lead the revolt in Tarlac as Caudillo or military leader of the province.

== The Cry ==
On the morning of January 24, 1897, Macabulos and his men charged at the Cuartel or garrison of Spanish civil guards and soldiers in La Paz, Tarlac, armed with primitive knives and spears along with very few guns, the revolutionaries triumphed and raided the cuartel for arms and ammunition. Later on through the year, the revolution continued to spread to neighboring provinces like Pampanga and Pangasinan, under the leadership of Macabulos, who was later appointed Brigadier General in June, 1897, Tarlac and the rest of central Luzon saw numerous victories and triumphs before the signing of the Pact of Biak-na-Bato in December, 1897.

== Spanish reaction ==
The Spaniards, preoccupied with the earlier victories at Pateros and Kakarong de Sili were alarmed by the sudden uprisings in Tarlac and Pampanga and immediately appointed General Ricardo Monet as zone commander of Pampanga in order to quell the insurrections there. Eventually, the Central Luzon revolutionaries that the Spaniards had depleted and pursued had regrouped and defeated them in numerous battles.

== Legacy ==
Francisco Makabulos went on to create a government body for the central Luzon area, with different towns being represented and a constitution of 13 articles was agreed on. Makabulos moved on to the mountains and continued to fight in the battle of Arayat, Pampanga, despite the serious defeat in Arayat, Makabulos continued to resist in the mountains. On 15 December 1897, the Pact of Biak-na-Bato was signed. This did not end Makabulos' revolutionary struggle and his forces continued the revolution until surrendering almost exactly a month later on 14 January 1898 when he accepted an amnesty offered by the Spaniards. Shortly after, he and Gregorio Aglipay formed the famous Revolutionary committee mentioned above, complete with constitution, representatives and a jurisdiction going as far as Ilocos.
