= Battles of Batangas =

- Part of the Philippine Revolution
Date	October 23, 1896
Location	Batangas Province, Philippines
Result	Spanish victory

Belligerents
Katipunan: Magdiwang	Spanish Empire: Guardia Civil

Commanders and leaders
Miguel Malvar	Ramón Blanco

Strength
~20,000 men Civilian supporters	4,500 infanterias (between 500–700 men in Taal garrison); 9,500 cazadores (reinforcements) unknown number of artillery

Casualties and losses
Unknown (heavy)	Unknown

The Battles of Batangas (Filipino: Labanan sa Batangas, Spanish: Batalla de Batangas) were fought on October 23, 1896, in the towns of Lemery, Bayungyungan, Calaca, and Taal in Batangas province, Philippines. The Katipunan army of Batangas, under General Miguel Malvar, was formed by the elite class in the province. They attempted to destroy Spanish installations in the towns, but failed after the Spanish garrison at Taal, having breaking off the siege earlier in the battle, came to the aid of the besieged towns. The rebels then abandoned their attack and retreated back to the hills, but they managed to save its northern neighbor, the province of Cavite, from recapture by the afterwards much weakened Spanish troops about few weeks later.

== Sources ==
- Miguel Malvar Museum and Library: Of Battles and Surrender
