= Battle of Puerto de Cavite =

1647 naval battle

Coordinates: 14°32′N 120°45′E

- Part of Eighty Years' War
| Date | 10 June 1647 |
| Location | Puerto de Cavite in Manila Bay, Captaincy General of the Philippines |
| Result | Spanish victory |

Belligerents
| Dutch Republic | Spain: Philippines |

Strength
| 12 ships | Several local ships |

Casualties and losses
| 2 ships | Unknown |

The naval Battle of Puerto de Cavite (Spanish: La Batalla del Puerto de Cavite; Filipino: Labanan sa Puerto ng Cavite) took place on 10 June 1647 during the Eighty Years' War between a Spanish fleet and a Dutch fleet in Puerto de Cavite, an important Spanish port in Manila Bay, Philippines in which the Dutch were defeated.

== Battle ==
Twelve Dutch ships besieged Puerto de Cavite, the home of the Manila galleons, on 10 June. The Spaniards and Filipinos defended the port with artillery fire and sank the Dutch flagship. Subsequently, the Dutch left with the Spaniards and Filipinos still maintaining control over the port. This came at a great cost since Porta Vaga, a Spanish stone fort that defended the area, was destroyed. The Dutch then went on to harass the Manila Bay area until the war's end in 1648 with the Treaty of Münster.

== Port ==
The port, Puerto de Cavite, was one of many important Spanish naval possessions in Manila Bay in the Captaincy General of the Philippines, and facilitated the Manila galleons trade between the Philippines and New Spain (present day Mexico). Puerto de Cavite is located in present-day Cavite City.

== See also ==
- Battles La Naval de Manila
- Spanish East Indies
