= Battle of San Mateo and Montalban =

- Part of the Philippine Revolution
| Date | November 1–8, 1896 |
| Location | Nanca Mariquina, San Mateo, Montalban, Manila, Philippines |
| Result | Strategic Spanish victory: Katipuneros retreat to Balara |

Belligerents
| Katipunan | Spanish Empire |

Commanders and leaders
| Andrés Bonifacio; Emilio Jacinto; Mariano Gutierrez; Luis Malinis; Macario Sakay | Ramón Blanco; Camilo de Polavieja |

Strength
| About 500 men (including survivors from Battle of Pinaglabanan); 100 irregulars from Antipolo | ~50 Infanterias; 6 Cannons |

Casualties and losses
| 80 dead 150 wounded | 20 dead 30 wounded |

The Battle of San Mateo and Montalban was fought between the remaining Katipuneros under the command of Andres Bonifacio and Emilio Jacinto and the Spanish government after a failed attempt to capture the El Deposito water works at San Juan del Monte.

== Background ==
After the failure to take San Juan del Monte, Bonifacio and the rest of his army retreated to the nearby areas of Mariquina, San Mateo and Montalban (present-day Rodriguez), all then in the province of Manila. Bonifacio and Jacinto encountered heavy Spanish pursuit as they retreated towards Morong.

== Battle ==
After the defeat at San Juan del Monte in 30 August 1896, Bonifacio and the remaining survivors of his army reached Marikina.

Months later, with the help of Macario Sakay, Apolonio Samson, Faustino Guillermo and General Luciona, the Katipuneros prepared for their next offensive. Jacinto sent out couriers to the neighboring towns, urging the patriots to join the cause. That same day, the first military ranks were conferred to the members of the Katipunan fighting forces.

The people's army at Antipolo and Uyungan of over 100 men with 32 revolvers and small cannons merged with the Masuyod contingent, and placed themselves under the overall command of General Kiko (alias Labe), a lieutenant of Bonifacio. In 1 November, the Katipuneros successfully captured Montalban, forcing the Spanish garrison to withdraw to San Mateo.

With renewed vigor, the Katipuneros, armed with bolos and spears, and a few captured Remingtons, set off for San Mateo, and attacked the town in 2 November. General Mariano Gutierrez and his Tungko troops, as Bonifacio ordered, surrounded the Spanish garrison in San Mateo, capturing the municipal hall of the town. The enemy forces were at the convent and parish house of the church, and they had six cannons. Generals Malinis and De la Cruz gave orders to fire and a furious exchange of fire from guns and cannons ensued the whole day until late in the afternoon. Along the Nangka (Nanca) river, the Supremo ordered his soldiers to make effigies from banana trunks and straw scarecrows. With KKK hats on the effigies, the duped enemy wasted bullets on these dummies. Routed, the Spaniard retreat leaving San Mateo to the hands of the triumphant rebels.

They encountered moderate resistance as they captured San Mateo and Montalban. While there, they regrouped and Bonifacio and his armies recovered from the major defeat, knowing that it was a vital loss and it would affect the image of both Bonifacio and the rest of the Manila Katipunan. However, this battle that he personally led was rather successful initially, and they continued to occupy parts of Morong until the Spanish counterattack.

== Spanish counterattack and subsequent recapture of Montalban ==
The Spanish reaction was swift and decisive. Three days later, on 4 November, Governor-General Ramón Blanco y Erenas quickly sent reinforcements to aid in the recapture of San Mateo and Montalban. When the Spanish reinforcements arrived in Marikina on 5 November, the Katipunan was defeated yet again at the hands of the Spaniards in a 3-day counteroffensive and the besieged garrison in San Mateo was relieved. On 8 November, Montalban would fall to the Spaniards. Bonifacio once again was forced to retreat - outnumbered, depleted and outgunned by the Spaniards.

== Retreat to Balara ==
The loss of Montalban did not affect Bonifacio as much as the earlier conflict. However, it gave him the opportunity to switch the objective from occupying Manila, to a Guerrilla-type warfare in the provinces. Bonifacio retreated to Balara once again to regroup, where he began to fight in skirmishes across Morong province.

== Guerrilla warfare in Morong ==
Bonifacio continued to personally lead fights and skirmishes in Morong until the end of the year, but oftentimes, most of these ill-fated attempts led to deaths on both sides and fruitless attempts to regain his reputation. Bonifacio personally led this desperate fight, hard-pressed and depleted, the Revolution in Morong province inevitably flopped. Bonifacio would not be released from this nightmare until he was invited to resolve the Magdalo-Magdiwang issue in Cavite which led to the conflict. He would not return from that province alive.

Other rebel leaders considered San Mateo as a refuge. After the Cry of Nueva Ecija, General Mariano Llanera began guerrilla tactics in Bulacan. As the Spaniards continuously pursued them, they made it to the foothills of San Mateo to establish headquarters in November 1896. In a similar way, after the disastrous Defeats suffered by Emilio Aguinaldo in Cavite, he and his men made their arduous trek to Montalban and later to Biak-Na-Bato.

== See also ==
- Andrés Bonifacio
- Pact of Biak-na-Bato
