= Battle of Tayabas =

Conflict during the Philippine Revolution

Siege of Tayabas
- Part of the Philippine Revolution
Date	24 June – 13 August, 1898
Location	Tayabas, Tayabas Province (now Quezon Province), Philippines
Result	Filipino victory
Territorial changes	Filipino revolutionaries liberated Tayabas province

Belligerents
Filipino Revolutionaries	Spanish Empire

Commanders and leaders
Miguel Malvar; Vicente Lukban; Manuel Arguelles; Eleuterio Marasigan	Joaquin Pacheco Yanguas

Strength
15,000: Batangas Brigade; Several militia units from nearby provinces recently liberated by the revolutionaries; Several local Tayabeño irregular units	443

Casualties and losses
1,600	27

The Siege of Tayabas (Filipino: Pagkubkob sa Tayabas, Spanish: Sitio de Tayabas) was a 2-month campaign of the Philippine Revolution that saw intense guerrilla warfare and bloodshed for the province. The battle occurred shortly after Aguinaldo's return from Hong Kong in May of the same year. Tayabas was just one of the many triumphs for the revolutionaries in that year, which led towards Philippine independence.

== Background ==
On 14 December 1897, Emilio Aguinaldo and Gov. Gen. Primo de Rivera signed the Pact of Biak-na-Bato ending the first phase of the Philippine Revolution. However, many generals of the revolution, like Paciano Rizal and Miguel Malvar, rejected the pact and continued the fight against Spain. Malvar took command of the disoriented and disillusioned forces of the southern provinces of Batangas, Tayabas and Laguna together with Rizal, but in the end, he rounded up his followers and left for Hong Kong together with other key revolutionaries.

In mid-May 1898, Aguinaldo returned and defeated the Spaniards at Alapan while Malvar came shortly after. Gathering once again an army from Batangas, Aguinaldo appointed him as a division general and tasked him to liberate the province of Tayabas and Batangas from the remaining Spaniards in the region.

== The Siege ==
On 15 June 1898, Malvar assembled his "Batangas Brigade" and crossed the border to Tayabas province. On the 24th, the siege of Tayabas began. The battle was said to have raged on for 2 months, mostly intense guerrilla warfare and jungle fighting, the casualties mounted and slowly, the battle was dragging into a stalemate as June drew near.

Both sides were well armed, with the Batanguenos freshly supplied with new weapons and ammunition from Aguinaldo's army in Cavite, with a steady supply of ammo and men, Malvar's forces in Tayabas began to slowly wrestle the province from the Spaniards. Similar events were occurring in Laguna, with Paciano Rizal cornering the Spaniards in Calamba, and Gregorio del Pilar occupying Bulacan and Nueva Ecija.

Slowly, the Spanish war effort was being depleted, after hearing of the terrible news from all around, and crippled by malaria and dysentery, on 13 August, Pacheco, the last Spanish governor of the province as well as 20 officials and 175 soldiers finally surrendered. Their defeat was formalized with the signing of a surrender document held at the plaza of the church that marked the end of the Spanish governance in the whole province.

Although Malvar's main army was armed with mausers and other modern weaponry, numerous Tayabeño Katipuneros who joined the fighting were armed with simple knives and spears; however, the advantage of the Spaniards in terms of weaponry was relatively neutralized due to the close up fighting in the jungles and foothills of Mt. Banahaw in Tayabas.

== Legacy ==
The victory in Tayabas, was, unfortunately, short-lived. Malvar and his men could only celebrate for a while before facing another enemy in the form of the Americans, Malvar was to fight an even more challenging war than with the Spaniards, and eventually emerging as one of the last generals to surrender to the Americans in 1902.
