= Civil Guard (Philippines) =

Civil Guard in the Philippines
- Guardia Civil en las Filipinas
- Badge of the Spanish Civil Guard
- Active: 1868–1898
- Country: Captaincy General of the Philippines
- Allegiance: King of Spain; Spanish Empire
- Branch: Spanish Army
- Type: Gendarmerie
- Role: Law enforcement
- Size: division 1,200 men (1868), three divisions 3,685 men (1897)
- Part of: Spanish Civil Guard; Spanish Army
- Garrison/HQ: Manila division (headquarters), Luzon division, Visayas division
- Mottos: El honor es mi divisa (Honor is my emblem)
- Engagements: Philippine Revolution; Spanish–American War

Insignia
- Abbreviation: GC
- Monogram

The Civil Guard in the Philippines (Spanish: Guardia Civil en las Filipinas, [ˈɡwaɾðja siˈβil en las filiˈpinas]) was the branch of the Spanish Civil Guard organized under the Captaincy General of the Philippines and a component of the Spanish Army. It was disbanded after the Spanish–American War. After the Philippine–American War, it was eventually replaced by the American occupational government with the Philippine Constabulary (PC).

== History ==
The Guardia Civil was introduced to the Philippines by the Spanish colonial government in 1868, during the term of Governor-General Carlos María de la Torre y Navacerrada. The organization began with a size of one division or around 1,200 men. By 1880, and this size was maintained until 1897, the Guardia Civil in the Philippines had a size of three divisions or more than 3,600 men. 2,000 were stationed in Luzon and the third in the Visayas.

== Composition ==
The majority of the civil guard consisted of non-criollo natives, otherwise known then as indios, making up approximately 60% of the total force.

== Role ==
The Guardia Civil in the Philippines followed closely the organisation of the metropolitan institution. Officers were drawn from the regular Spanish army. Under normal conditions, they formed patrols consisting of two men. Larger detachments were organized for operations such as the suppression of bandit groups. By 1897, the force had 155 Spanish officers.

The Guardia Civil had the power to impose penalties for infringements of law and local ordinances. They could arrest people upon suspicion alone, and the Spanish colonial government did not bar the Guardia Civil from using torture techniques in interrogation processes. They could also kill suspects without trial if resistance was offered.

During the first phase of the Philippine Revolution (1896–1897), the Guardia Civil constituted around 60 percent of the native component of the Spanish military forces in the colony.

== Guardia Civil Veterana ==
The Guardia Civil Veterana (literally "Veteran Civil Guard") was formed during the period of 1871 to 1872 under Governor-General Rafael Izquierdo y Gutiérrez to be the urban gendarmerie force of Manila. This organization began with 37 officers and 322 men as of July 11, 1872. By 1898, it had 14 officers and 325 men.

== In fiction ==
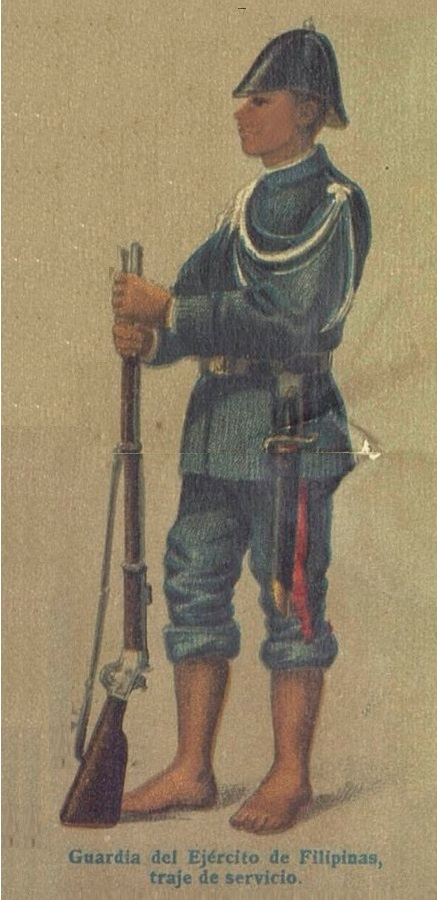

The alleged actions of the Guardia Civil are depicted in José Rizal's novels, Noli Me Tángere and El filibusterismo.

In terms of the alleged interrogation process, Rizal describes in the 57th chapter of Noli Me Tángere how Tarsilo was tortured to death by the Guardia Civil. In that same part of the book, Andong Sintó-sintó was sent to the capital, Manila, to be imprisoned for merely picking bananas for supper.

In the fifth chapter of El filibusterismo, a cochero or coachman is held up, hit and taken to prison by an officer of the Guardia Civil for failing to show his cédula (a term now used for the community tax certificate).

== Other civil guards ==
- During the Huk Rebellion, there were anti-guerrilla militiamen known as civil guards.
- Until 1992, the Bureau of Corrections designated its lowest-ranking members as civil guards.
