= Igorot resistance to Spanish colonization =

History and impact of Igorot people's resistance against Spain

Map of the Philippines with the present-day Cordillera Administrative Region highlighted, where Igorot resistance was concentrated

For three centuries, the Igorot peoples of the Cordillera mountain range resisted Spanish attempts at colonization. Despite efforts by the Spanish Empire to exert colonial control over northern Luzon, they never managed to fully subjugate the mountainous areas of the region.

The Spaniards were heavily motivated to invade Igorot territory by the prospect of economic gain, particularly due to the gold deposits in the region. Religious orders were also motivated by the prospect of proselytizing and missionary work.

Igorot resistance was largely successful due to a combination of geographical and social factors. The mountainous terrain of Northern Luzon made excursions into the highlands relatively difficult and gave the native Igorots an advantage. Existing social, religious, and political structures made the idea of subjugation under the Spaniards unappealing and incentivized resistance.

Igorot resistance transformed Igorot society and views toward the Igorot people. Trade relationships between highlanders and the lowland population were relegated to a black market outside the colonial monopoly. Social and political relationships were shaped through the lens of colonial conflict. For the Spaniards, the Igorot people gained a reputation for being rebels and backward pagans, and the continuing Igorot independence was a mark of shame for colonial officials.

Repeated Spanish incursions forced the Igorot people to retreat further inland, abandoning old settlements and weakening Igorot society as a whole. Advancements in technology in the 19th century also closed the gap between terrain advantage and numerical superiority, allowing the Spaniards to make substantial gains into Igorot territory. The Spaniards were, ultimately, unable to fully subjugate Igorot territory by the end of the Spanish colonial period in 1898.

== Background ==
=== Pre-colonial Igorot society ===
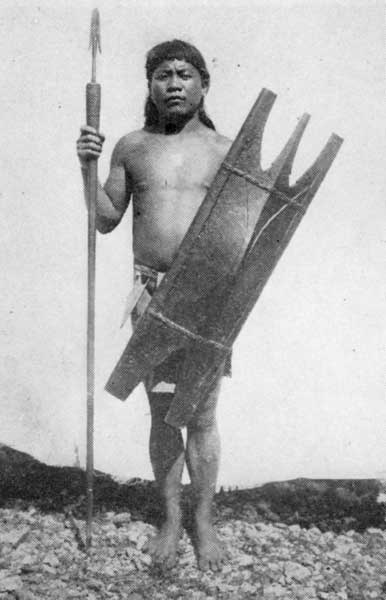
A Bontoc headhunter

Igorot is a collective term for multiple ethnolinguistic groups that reside in Northern Luzon which includes the Bontoc, Gaddang, Ifugao, Ilongot, Ibaloi, Isneg, Kalinga, Kankanay, and Tingguian. Prior to Spanish colonization, the different peoples living in the Cordillera region did not consider themselves part of a singular group; the term Igorot was used to refer to all mountain-dwelling peoples in the Gran Cordillera Central.

Economic production across Igorot peoples was varied. Ibaloy and Kankanay Igorots primarily focused on agriculture and relied on small-scale household-oriented production. Benguet Igorots, meanwhile, relied on gold mining as the basis of social organization. A robust trade network existed between the Igorot people and lowland villages in Ilocos.

Politically, the Igorot people were no more united than other Filipinos during this time. Conflicts frequently arose within Cordillera communities, with the practice of headhunting common to settle disputes.

=== Motives for Spanish colonization ===
The Spaniards were heavily motivated by the prospect of economic gain in the Cordillera region. As early as 1565, Miguel Lopez de Legazpi had already heard stories of gold deposits in North Luzon. In 1572, Juan de Salcedo organized an expedition to the north in search of these gold deposits, eventually reaching Ilocos.

Religious conversion was another motive force in attempting to subjugate the Igorot people. The Augustinian and Dominican Orders, in particular, alternated between attempts to live within Igorot communities and enticing Igorots to live in Christian settlements, with varying success.

The Spanish Empire considered the entire territory of the Philippines to be part of its territory, and recognized the Spanish colonial government as the sole legitimate political power in the region. It considered indigenous political structures as inherently illegitimate and rebellious.

== History ==
=== First contact ===
Evidence of the Spanish first learning of the location of gold mines within Igorot territory dates back to 1574, through the expeditions led by Juan de Salcedo. The first reports of the actual location of gold mines was by Governor-General Francisco de Sande in 1576, through an expedition led by Sergeant Major Juan de Morones which brought back ore coming from the Cordillera mountains.

A third expedition was sent out in 1580, led by Juan Pacheco Maldonado, and managed to bring back both ore samples and two finished gold bars. However, this proved to be a failure once it was revealed that the gold was obtained through trade in Pangasinan.

At least four expeditions were sent out between 1591 and 1594 by Governors-General Gómez Pérez Dasmariñas and Luis Pérez Dasmariñas to extract tribute from villages from the south of the Caraballo Mountains to the Gran Cordillera Central. They were aided by Dionisio Capolo, a local maharlika from Candaba and managed to reach the upper Magat River. The first description of the Ygolotes comes from these expeditions.

=== Spanish attempts at colonization ===
The 1591 to 1594 expeditions garnered mixed results. Some villages paid tribute to the Spaniards while others fought back, successfully or unsuccessfully. This led to Igorot attacks against lowland settlements with the intent of capturing heads or taking prisoners for ransom or to work the mines, and the general disruption of communication between Ilocos and the capital of Manila.

In 1601, Governor-General Francisco Tello de Guzman ordered an expedition to subjugate the eastern half of Pampanga province (now modern-day Nueva Ecija). He first sent Ernesto Marin, the prior of Ilocos to persuade the Igorot people from resistance, and was murdered as a result. Lieutenant Mateo de Aranda was sent to attack the Igorots but was ambushed and killed.

In 1606, as a result of repeated attacks against the Spaniards and their Filipino subjects, the Real Audiencia of Manila issued an edict that allowed native Filipinos in Pampanga and other towns suffering Igorot attacks to take up arms and enslave captured Igorots.

The outbreak of the Thirty Years' War incentivized the Spanish Empire to make greater effort towards controlling the Igorot gold mines. On February 1620, Governor-General Alonso Fajardo de Tenza organized an expedition under Captain Garcia Aldana y Cabrera. The route of this expedition would be the pattern used by all subsequent Spanish expeditions.

Aldana took 30 Spanish troops, accompanied by 900 troops raised in Ilocos and Pangasinan, Dominican friars, and cargo bearers, totaling 1,700 in all. From Aringay, Aldana crossed north towards the Naguilian River to Duplas. In Duplas, Aldana heard mass and received 50 Igorot chieftains. When Aldana explained that he had come to give them pardons for their past crimes in exchange for their vassalage, the Igorots refused and replied that he should give them tribute, and that if that was unacceptable, then he could climb the mountains and see what stuff the Igorots were made of. Aldana broke camp and continued, following the Bornotan River, eventually reaching the mining community of Bua.

On reaching Bua, the Spaniards found that the settlement had been destroyed, with the inhabitants having fled to the mountains. Aldana built Fort Santisima Trinidad in the area and ventured deeper, eventually reaching the Antamok mines before returning in May.

Fajardo sent another expedition in 1623, led by Sergeant Major Antonio Carreño de Valdez. Carreño de Valdez built Fort Santiago overlooking the Sto. Niño mines and Fort del Rosario overlooking the Antamok-Itogon area. Faced with two forts, the Igorots feigned submission and waited until the rainy season, before a successful ambush forced the Spaniards to abandon both forts.

The following year, Fajardo sent another expedition led by Don Alonso Martin Quirante. Quirante mustered a force of 1,903 soldiers, carpenters, smiths, clergy, and so on. Quirante met fierce resistance from the Igorots, including a fortified blockade near Duplas, but eventually managed to reach the Galan mines, adjacent to the former Fort Santiago. Quirante rebuilt Fort Santiago and began testing five mines in the adjacent area and fought off Igorot incursions until June, when he returned to Manila with 4,600 kilograms of ore in 400 baskets. The Real Audiencia cancelled Quirante's expedition due to mounting costs and loss of life. The Quirante expedition was the last attempt to directly control the gold mines.

In 1667, Governor-General Diego de Salcedo authorized another expedition under the leadership of Admiral Pedro Duran de Monforte and aided by an Igorot chieftain named Layuga. Duran headed inland to Baguio from Tagudin, eventually reaching Kayan. The expedition lasted a year before a lack of supplies and disease weakened their position in Kayan and an Igorot attack forced the Spaniards to finally abandon the settlement. This would be their last attempt to subjugate the Cordilleras for the next hundred years.

=== 1759 expedition ===
In 1755, Augustinian friar Pedro de Vivar established the Tonglo mission near Baguio, but was subsequently driven out after six months for offending the local Igorot community with his attempts to take down their religious idol. An attempt in 1759 to reclaim the mission was defeated with an ambush. In response, Governor Pedro Manuel de Arandia Santisteban ordered Manuel Arza de Urrutia to embark on a punitive expedition. Arza would raze Tonglo to the ground after five hours of artillery fire, but the Igorot defenders simply retreated further inland to the mountains.

The 1759 expedition ended Augustinian missionary work in the Cordilleras. It also left the Igorots in possession of their natural resources and territory. After a short period of reprisal against communities who participated in the expedition, relations between lowland communities and mountain Igorots were normalized once again. The Spanish colonial government focused on economic growth and the cultivation of cash crops, although forts were still established and maintained near the Magat River.

Smaller punitive expeditions were sent in the 1770s to force Igorots to settle in reduccion settlements, with varying success. This policy continued until the 1790s.

=== Galvey expeditions ===
From 1829 to 1839, Colonel Guillermo Galvey undertook 45 expeditions up and down the La Trinidad valley of Benguet in an effort to suppress the illicit tobacco trade and subjugate the Igorot people. Galvey's expeditions destroyed the La Trinidad valley and allowed the Spaniards to adopt a policy of conquest. According to accounts, the number of houses in the valley went from 500 when Galvey first arrived to nine when he left.

Advancements in technology also allowed the Spaniards to more effectively subjugate the Igorots during the 19th century. The invention of the Remington Arms Company's repeating rifles meant that muskets that were useless during the rainy season were obsolete.

== Missionary work ==
Spanish missionaries also made the effort to convert the Igorots to Catholicism, with missions primarily led by the Augustinian Order based in Ilocos and the Dominican Order based in Cagayan. During the early decades of Spanish colonization, some friars were able to traverse the Cordillera mountains unarmed in order to proselytize and convert people living in the mountains. Missionaries who were also aware of the Igorot gold mines aided in its secrecy, presumably out of a sense of sparing the local population from the excessive exploitation that happened in colonial Peru.

In 1604, the Dominicans established a mission in Pudtol, the first in the Cordilleras. Additional missions would also be established in Capinatan in 1691 and Tonglo in 1755, all in modern-day Benguet province. More missions in Ifugao and Lepanto would be established in the 1800s. More missions would be established during the 18th century but would not last over a decade.

The Dominicans relented after the Spanish colonial government assured them that the Igorot gold mines would not suffer the same fate as the American silver mines. The Church would try to encourage exploration of the Cordilleras to facilitate conversion among the native populace. In 1619, the Church justified the subjugation of the Igorots under the basis of just war by first offering an amnesty with the expectation that they will refuse, before proceeding with an invasion.

Dominicans also established missions in lowland areas to entice Igorots to come down for conversion, also known as reduccion. Though some Igorots would be Christianized, Igorots usually responded by attacking mission towns and razing them to the ground, such as the case of San Bartolome, Malionglong in 1668. The Tonglo mission in 1755 was similarly razed by the Spaniards after the Igorots drove out Fr. Pedro Vivar for smashing their idols. The Igorots simply relocated deeper into the mountains.

Missionary activity persisted in the 18th century, led by the Dominicans in Cagayan, with mixed success. Their goal was to connect the Pangasinan and Cagayan missions through a direct route in the Caraballo mountains.

Missionary work in the Cordillera mountains would be withdrawn at the start of the 18th century. Missionary work was confined to the reduccion areas near the frontier, where it was more easily defensible for the Spaniards. Priests engaged with Igorot communities on a village level and participated in local politics in order to get concessions and convert them to Catholicism.

Igorots were resistant to Catholic conversion. For the most part, Igorots reacted negatively to attempts to proselytize, often driving Spanish priests out or resorting to violence. Some Igorots used baptism as a way to be allowed access to trade in the lowlands. Igorot refusal to convert was also reinforced by their refusal to pay tribute to the Spaniards.

== Impacts of Igorot resistance ==
=== Economic ===
The Spaniards were unable to fully incorporate the gold and tobacco trade within their crown monopoly as a result of Igorot resistance. The initial Spanish incursions to Igorot territory discouraged Igorots from mining gold. After Quirante's failed expedition, the Spaniards were no longer interested in directly controlling the gold mines in Benguet and instead sought to tax it, demanding 20% on gold production. The tax rate would fluctuate throughout the 17th century due to faltering gold production.

The imposition of the reduccion system changed economic life for many Igorots who were used to swidden farming. Missionaries introduced agricultural techniques such as irrigation and the use of plows. Dominican and Augustinian missionary work also entailed the construction of roads and communication lines through Igorot territory, which facilitated travel and trade. It also disrupted economic life for existing settlements, especially following the punitive expeditions in the late 18th century.

By the 18th century, cash crops like tobacco and sugar cane were introduced in mountain areas, which the Igorot people cultivated and sold. In the late 18th century, Igorots were able to take advantage of the 1781 tobacco monopoly by participating in a black market with lowland buyers. The Spaniards were forced to send a punitive expedition in 1829 to suppress this trade, which resulted in the decimation of the La Trinidad valley and destruction of free commerce in the area.

Spanish colonial authorities tried to ban trade between Igorots and lowland Filipinos, but it was largely ignored by Igorots and Christian Filipinos alike. Trade continued well into the 18th and 19th centuries, especially on contraband goods like tobacco.

=== Political ===
Functionally, the highlands of the Cordilleras were independent from Spanish rule. Political structures within Igorot society remained relatively the same. Throughout Spanish colonization, the Igorot people were aware of their independence and exercised self-determination in their affairs. One consequence of Igorot resistance was the rise of the baknang class within Igorot society to a position of prominence.

The Igorots were kept updated on political events outside their territory. In 1660, Igorots participated in the 1660–1661 Andres Malong revolt in Pangasinan. During the British invasion of Manila, Igorot traders were aware of the news and asked for updates. Tingguian Igorots also joined Diego Silang in his rebellion in 1763.

The continued independence of the Igorot people perplexed Spanish colonial officers and was seen as a mark of shame. The Spaniards treated the Igorots as being in a state of rebellion and exercising an illegitimate government in the Cordilleras, despite their inability to exert actual power in the region. In the 17th century, Spanish expeditions into the Cordilleras largely resulted in failure to subjugate the Igorot population. In the 18th century, missionaries like Fr. Joseph Marin followed Igorot customs to forge peace treaties and negotiate other deals with indigenous leaders. Igorot leaders were able to secure concessions such as tax exemptions in exchange for allowing priests to enter their territory.

=== Cultural ===
Independence from Spanish control allowed the Igorot people to retain many aspects of their society.

Conversely, the Spaniards regarded the Igorot people as enemies and rebels, often describing the region as a den of unrest and rebellion. Early on, lowland Filipinos who wished to escape colonial subjugation usually found refuge in Igorot settlements. In 1606, an account by Fr. Francisco Antolin of the Zambals in Central Luzon (another group of highland people) described them as cannibalistic and engaging in mutilation against their Christian captives. Antolin also describes the Igorot people as generally being backwards and savage, compared to civilized and Christianized Filipino natives.

== End of Igorot resistance ==
Spanish rule in the Gran Cordillera Central officially began with the subjugation of Benguet in 1846. The final Spanish census of 1898 counted 120,444 pagans recognizing vassalage to the Spanish king. The Philippine Revolution upended Spanish rule in the Philippines and sought to replace it with a Filipino republic. The Igorot people were for the most part neutral, with some supporting revolutionary activity.

Igorot independence would end under American occupation, with the Igorot people siding with the United States before ultimately being subjugated by them.

== See also ==
- Igorot people
- Spanish-Moro conflict
