= Philippine Insurgency =

Philippine Insurgency often refers to the Philippine–American War (1899–1902), sometimes known as the Philippine War of Independence, an armed military conflict between the Philippines and the United States.

It may also refer to various revolts, rebellions, revolutions, and guerrilla actions fought in the Philippine Islands, including:

- Numerous revolts against Spain during the Spanish colonial period (1565–1898); see Philippine revolts against Spain and Military history of the Philippines#Spanish colonial period (1565–1898)
- The Philippine Revolution (1896–1898), called the "Tagalog Revolt" by the Spanish, a military conflict between the people of the Philippines and the Spanish colonial authorities which resulted in the secession of the Philippines from the Spanish Empire
- The Moro Rebellion (1899–1913), a military conflict between Muslim Filipino revolutionary groups and the United States

== See also ==
- Military history of the Philippines
