= Bankaw revolt =

Revolt against Spanish colonial rule in Leyte, Philippines

The Bankaw revolt (1621–1622) was a religious uprising against Spanish colonial rule led by Bankaw or Bancao (which per Sanchez dictionary and Alcina's account, the word means "spear" in Waray), datu of Limasawa, Carigara, Abuyog, Sogod (now part of southern Leyte). He welcomed Miguel Lopez de Legazpi's landing in Carigara in 1565, made a blood pact and converted to Christianity. He received a letter of gratitude and a gift from King Philip II of Spain for his and his grandfather's hospitality to Legazpi and Ferdinand Magellan, respectively. Despite becoming one of the first converts of Catholicism during the Legazpi expedition, he apostatized and severed his allegiance to the Spanish after fifty years. Together with his children, notable his son Pagali, a babaylan, he built a temple for a diwata, and he incited people from six towns to participate in the revolt. It is believed that Pagali used some magic to attract followers, and thought that they could turn the Spaniards into clay by hurling bits of earth at them.

Parish priest Father Melchor de Vera went to Cebu to report the insurrection. The rebellion was suppressed by Juan de Alcarazo, the alcalde mayor of Cebu, and the Spanish and Filipino colonial troops in forty ships sent by Governor-General Alonso Fajardo de Entenza. Encamping within the temple for a diwata, the Spaniards burned it down after ten days. Bankaw's head was pierced in a bamboo stake and was displayed for the public to serve as a warning. Pagali was beheaded, and one other babaylan was burned at the stake. Three other followers were executed by a firing squad. In order to dispel the blindness caused by the influence of diwata, eighty one rebel priests were burned. Some rebels were captured, including the daughter and son of Bankaw.

== See also ==
- Philippine revolts against Spain
  - Dagami revolt of Palo, Leyte
  - Pulahanes of northern Leyte
