= Military history of the Philippines =

The military history of the Philippines is characterized by wars between Philippine kingdoms and its neighbors in the precolonial era and then Spanish and American era, and then occupation by the Empire of Japan during World War II and participation in Asian conflicts post-World War II such as the Korean War and the Vietnam War. The Philippines has also battled a communist insurgency and a secessionist movement by Muslims in the southern portion of the country.

== Prehistoric period (before 1000 BC – 900 AD) ==
Negritos were among the archipelago's earliest inhabitants, descendants of the first human migrations out of Africa via the coastal route along southern Asia to the now sunken landmasses of Sundaland and Sahul area around 48,000 to 5000 BC. The first Austronesians reached the Philippines at around 2200 BC, settling the Batanes Islands and northern Luzon. From there, they rapidly spread downward to the rest of the islands of the Philippines. They assimilated earlier Negritos that arrived during the Paleolithic, resulting in the modern Filipino ethnic groups that all display various ratios of genetic admixture between Austronesian and Negrito groups.

By 1000 BC, the inhabitants of the Philippine archipelago had developed into four distinct kinds of peoples: tribal groups, such as the Aetas, Ilongots and the Mangyan who depended on hunter-gathering and were concentrated in forests; warrior societies, such as the Isneg and Kalinga who practiced social ranking and ritualized warfare and roamed the plains; the petty plutocracy of the Ifugao Cordillera Highlanders, who occupied the mountain ranges of Luzon; and the harbor principalities of the estuarine civilizations such as the Tagalogs, Visayans, Taūsugs, Maranaos and the Maguindanaons that grew along rivers and seashores while participating in trans-island maritime trade. It was also during the first millennium BC that early metallurgy was said to have reached the archipelagos of maritime Southeast Asia via trade with India.

Archaeological findings dating from prehistoric eras have discovered a variety of stone and metal weaponry, such as axes, arrows and spearheads. Usually used for hunting, they also allowed tribes to battle with each other. Some more elaborate bronze pieces, such as axes and swords, were also part of the native weaponry. The making of swords involved elaborate rituals that were based mainly on the auspicious conjunctions of planets. The passage of the sword from the maker entailed a mystical ceremony that was coupled with tribal beliefs. The lowlanders of Luzon use the kampilan, bararao and panabas, while the Moros and animists of the South still continue the tradition of making kris.

== Pre-colonial period (900 AD to 1565) ==
=== Ma-i and Bruneian alliance against China ===
By the 800s, British Historian Robert Nicholl citing Arab chronicler Al Ya'akubi, had written that on those years, the kingdoms of Muja (Then Pagan Brunei/Vijayapura) and Mayd (Ma-i) waged war against the Chinese Empire.

=== Kedatuan of Madja-as against Chola Occupied Srivijaya ===
In the aftermath of the Indian Chola invasion of Srivijaya (1025 AD), Datu Puti led some dissident datus from Borneo (including present day Brunei which then was the location of the Vijayapura state which was a local colony of the Hindu-Buddhist Srivijaya empire) and Sumatra in a rebellion against Rajah Makatunao, who was a Chola-appointed local rajah. This oral legend of ancient Hiligaynons rebelling against Rajah Makatunao have corroboration in Chinese records during the Song dynasty when Chinese scholars recorded that the ruler during a February 1082 AD diplomatic meeting, was Seri Maharaja, and his descendant was Rajah Makatunao and was together with Sang Aji (grandfather to Sultan Muhammad Shah). According to the Maragtas the dissidents against new Rajah's rule and their retinue, tried to revive Srivijaya in a new country called Madja-as in the Visayas islands (an archipelago named after Srivijaya) in the Philippines. Seeing how the actual Srivijayan Empire reached even the outer coast of Borneo, which is already neighboring the Philippines, Historian Robert Nicholl implied that the Srivijayans of Sumatra, Vijayans of Vijayapura at Brunei-Sarawak, and the Visayans in the Philippines were all related and connected to each other since they form one contiguous area.

According to Augustinian Friar, Rev. Fr. Santaren, Datu Macatunao or Rajah Makatunao is the "sultan of the Moros," and a relative of Datu Puti who seized the properties and riches of the ten datus. Robert Nicholls, a historian from Brunei identified Rajah Tugao, the leader of the Malano Kingdom of Sarawak, as the Rajah Makatunao referred to in the Maragtas. The Bornean warriors Labaodungon and Paybare, after learning of this injustice from their father-in-law Paiburong, sailed to Odtojan in Borneo where Makatunaw ruled. Using local soldiers recruited from the Philippines as well as fellow pioneers, the warriors sacked the city, killed Makatunaw and his family, retrieved the stolen properties of the 10 datus, enslaved the remaining population of Odtojan, and sailed back to Panay. Labaw Donggon and his wife, Ojaytanayon, later settled in a place called Moroboro. Afterwards there are descriptions of various towns founded by the datus in Panay, other Visayan islands, and southern Luzon.

=== Champa-Sulu War ===
The Chams who migrated to Sulu were called Orang Dampuan. The Champa civilization and the port-kingdom of Sulu engaged in commerce with each other which resulted in merchant Chams settling in Sulu where they were known as Orang Dampuan from the 10th to 13th century. The Orang Dampuan were slaughtered by envious native Sulu Buranuns due to the wealth of the Orang Dampuan. The Buranun were then subjected to retaliatory slaughter by the Orang Dampuan. Harmonious commerce between Sulu and the Orang Dampuan was later restored. The Yakans were descendants of the Taguima-based Orang Dampuan who came to Sulu from Champa. Sulu received civilization in its Indic form from the Orang Dampuan.

=== Visayan raids against China ===
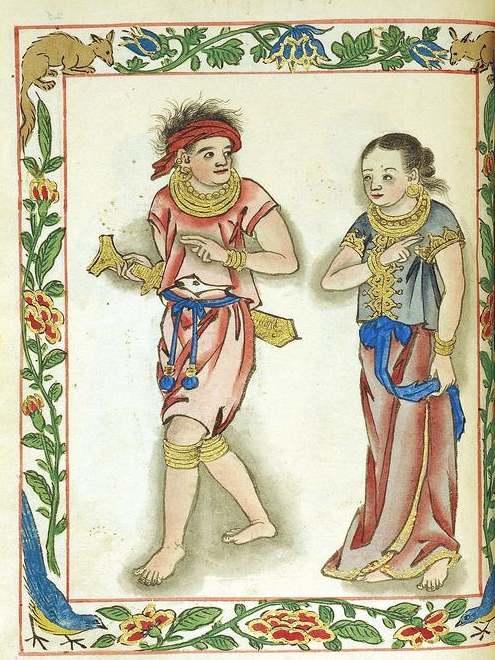
A Visayan kadatuan (royal) and his wife wearing red, the distinctive color of their class. He is wielding a golden sword.

Antecedent to these raids, sometime between A.D. 1174 and 1190, a traveling Chinese government bureaucrat Chau Ju-Kua reported that a certain group of "ferocious raiders of China's Fukien coast" which he called the "Pi-sho-ye", believed to have lived on the southern part of Formosa.

In A.D. 1273, another work written by Ma Tuan Lin, which came to the knowledge of non-Chinese readers through a translation made by the Marquis D'Hervey de Saint-Denys, gave reference to the Pi-sho-ye raiders, thought to have originated from the southern portion of Formosa. However, the author observed that these raiders spoke a different language and had an entirely different appearance (presumably when compared to the inhabitants of Formosa). Some scholars have put forth the theory that the Pi-sho-ye were actually people from the Visayas islands. Furthermore, Boholano oral legends say that people from the Kedatuan of Dapitan were the ones that lead the raids on China.

=== Pon-i Invasion of Philippine Kingdoms ===
During the 12th century, then-Hindu Brunei called "Pon-i", as reported in the Chinese annals Nanhai zhi, invaded Malilu 麻裏蘆 (present-day Manila) as it also administered Sarawak and Sabah, as well as the Philippine kingdoms Butuan, Sulu, Ma-i (Mindoro), Shahuchong 沙胡重 (present-day Siocon), Yachen 啞陳 (Oton), and 文杜陵 Wenduling (present-day Mindanao). Manila regained independence.

=== War between Sulu and Majapahit ===
In the mid 14th century, the Majapahit empire mentioned in its manuscript Nagarakretagama Canto 14, written by Prapanca in 1365, that the area of Solot (Sulu) was part of the empire. Nagarakretagama was composed as a eulogy for their emperor Hayam Wuruk. However, Chinese sources then report that in 1369, the Sulus regained independence and in vengeance, assaulted Majapahit and its province, Po-ni (Brunei) which Majapahit invaded, looting it of treasure and gold. A fleet from the Majapahit capital succeeded in driving away the Sulus, but Po-ni was left weaker after the attack and the Majapahit collaborating Pon-i royalty have to deal with the theft of two sacred pearls by Sulu. The Majapahit Empire, attempted to reconquer the kingdoms of Sulu and Manila but they were permanently repulsed. Furthermore, the Sulus counter-invaded deep into Majapahit held East Kalimantan and North Kalimantan

=== War between the Moros and Cebu ===
During the early 1400s, Rajamuda Sri Lumay, a Chola dynasty prince who rebelled against the Cholas and sided with his Malay subjects established an independent Tamil-Malay Indianized kingdom in Cebu called the Rajahnate of Cebu, he established his country by waging scorched earth tactics against raiders from Mindanao. War between the Muslims and Cebu lasted until the Spanish era.

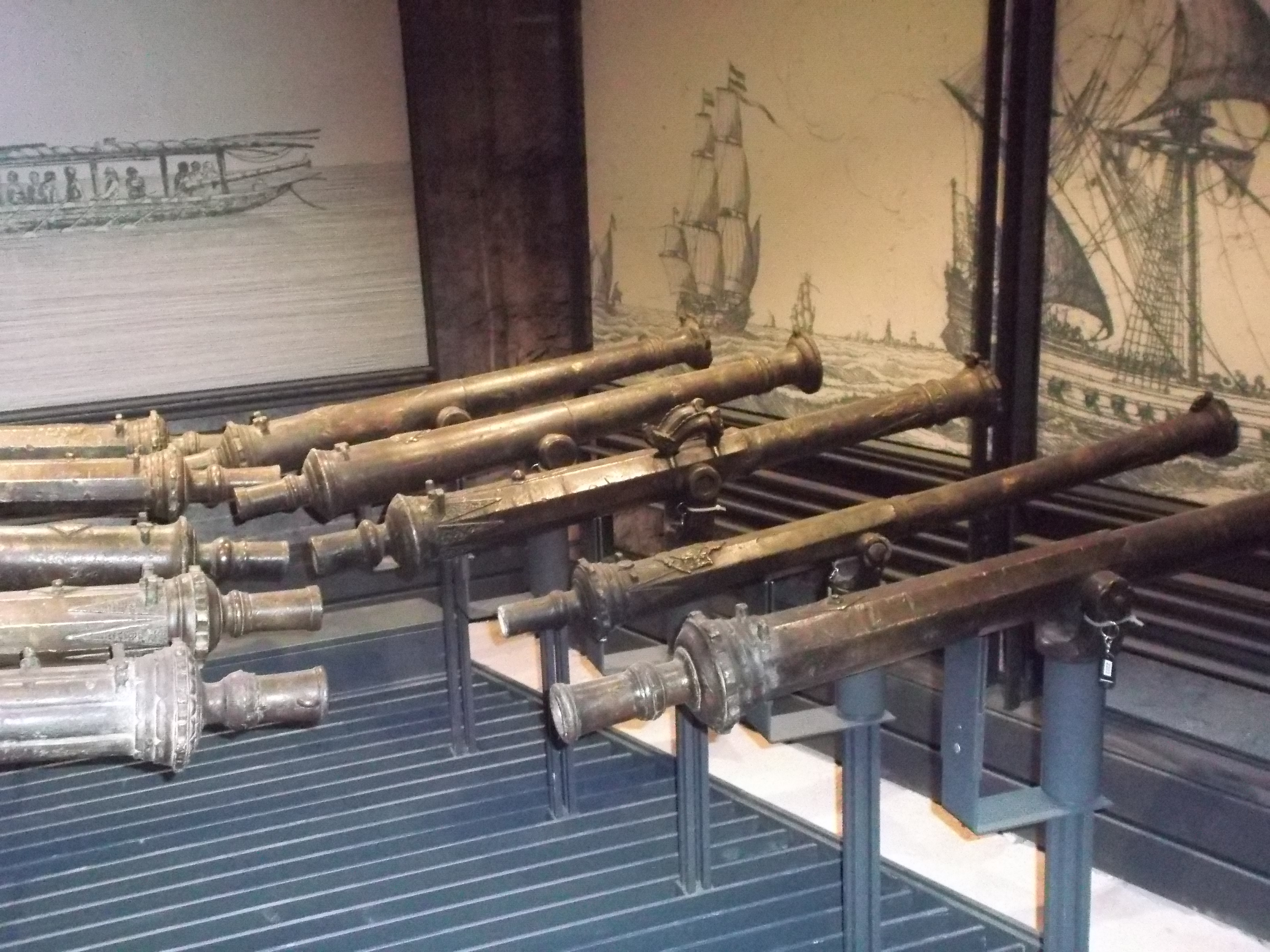
Collection of Philippine lantaka in a European museum

=== Brunei's invasion of Tondo, incorporation of Sulu and establishment of Manila ===
The Battle of Manila (1500s) was fought in Manila between citizens of the Kingdom of Tondo led by their Lakan, Sukwu and the soldiers of the Sultanate of Brunei led by Sultan Bolkiah the singing captain. The aftermath of the battle was the formation of an alliance between the newly established Kingdom of Maynila (Selurong) and the Sultanate of Brunei, to crush the power of the Kingdom of Tondo and the subsequent installation of the Pro-Islamic Rajah Sulaiman into power. Furthermore, Sultan Bolkiah's victory over Sulu and Seludong (modern day Manila), as well as his marriages to Laila Mecanai the daughter of Sulu Sultan Amir Ul-Ombra (an uncle of Sharifa Mahandun married to Nakhoda Angging or Maharaja Anddin of Sulu), and to the daughter of Datu Kemin, widened Brunei's influence in the Philippines.

=== Territorial conflict between Manila and Tondo ===
According to the account of Rajah Matanda as recalled by Magellan expedition members Gines de Mafra, Rodrigo de Aganduru Moriz, and expedition scribe Antonio Pigafetta, Maynila had a territorial conflict with Tondo in the years before 1521.

At the time, Rajah Matanda's mother (whose name was not mentioned in the accounts) served as the paramount ruler of the Maynila polity, taking over from Rajah Matanda's father (also unnamed in the accounts), who had died when Rajah Matanda was still very young. Rajah Matanda, then simply known as the "Young Prince" Ache, was raised alongside his cousin, who was ruler of Tondo – presumed by some to be a young Bunao Lakandula, although not specifically named in the accounts.

During this time, Ache realized that his cousin, who was ruler of the Tondo polity, was "slyly" taking advantage of Ache's mother by taking over territory belonging to Maynila. When Ache asked his mother for permission to address the matter, his mother refused, encouraging the young prince to keep his peace instead. Prince Ache could not accept this and thus left Maynila with some of his father's trusted men, to go to his "grandfather", the Sultan of Brunei, to ask for assistance. The Sultan responded by giving Ache a position as commander of his naval force.

In 1521, Prince Ache was coming fresh from a military victory at the helm of the Bruneian navy and was supposedly on his way back to Maynila with the intent of confronting his cousin when he came upon and attacked the remnants of the Magellan expedition, then under the command of Sebastian Elcano. Some historians suggest that Ache's decision to attack must have been influenced by a desire to expand his fleet even further as he made his way back to Lusong and Maynila, where he could use the size of his fleet as leverage against his cousin, the ruler of Tondo.

=== Battle of Mactan ===
The Battle of Mactan on April 27, 1521, is celebrated as the earliest reported resistance of the natives in the Philippines against western invaders. Lapu-Lapu, a Chieftain of Mactan Island, defeated Christian European explorers led by the Portuguese navigator Ferdinand Magellan.

On March 16, 1521, the island of Samar was sighted. The following morning, March 17, Magellan landed on the island of Homonhon. He parleyed with Rajah Calambu of Limasawa, who guided him to Cebu Island on April 7. With the aid of Magellan's Malay interpreter, Enrique, Rajah Humabon of Cebu and his subjects converted to Christianity and became allies. Suitably impressed by Spanish firearms and artillery, Rajah Humabon suggested that Magellan project power to cow Lapu-Lapu, who was being belligerent against his authority.

Magellan deployed 49 armored men, less than half his crew, with crossbows and guns, but could not anchor near land because the island is surrounded by shallow coral bottoms and thus unsuitable for the Spanish galleons to get close to shore. His crew had to wade through the surf to make a landing and the ship was too far to support them with artillery. Antonio Pigafetta, a supernumerary on the voyage who later returned to Seville, Spain, records that Lapu-Lapu had at least 1500 warriors in the battle. During the battle, Magellan was wounded in the leg, while still in the surf. As the crew were fleeing to the boats, Pigafetta recorded that Magellan covered their retreat, turning at them on several occasions to make sure they were getting away, and was finally surrounded by a multitude of warriors and killed. The total toll was of eight crewmen killed on Magellan's side against an unknown number of casualties from the Mactan natives.

=== The Kedatuan of Dapitan vs the Ternate and Lanao Sultanates ===
By 1563, before the full Spanish colonization agenda came to Bohol, the Kedatuan of Dapitan was at war with the Sultanate of Ternate, a Papuan speaking Muslim state in the Moluccas, which was also raiding the Rajahnate of Butuan. At the time, Dapitan was ruled by two brothers named Dalisan and Pagbuaya. The Ternateans at the time were allied to the Portuguese. Dapitan was destroyed by Ternateans and Datu Dalisan was killed in battle. His brother, Datu Pagbuaya, together with his people fled to Mindanao and established a new Dapitan in the northern coast of the Zamboanga peninsula and displaced its Muslim natives. In the process, waging war against the Sultanate of Lanao and conquering territories from the Sultanate.

=== Lucoes Mercenary Activity ===
Due to the conflict-ridden nature of the Philippine archipelago, warriors were forged in the many wars in the islands, thus the islands acquired a reputation for its capable mercenaries, which were soon employed all across South and Southeast Asia with some influence even manifested in East Asia at Japan where Lucoes sailors initially guided Portuguese ships to the Shogunate and even South Asia in Sri Lanka where Lungshanoid pottery from Luzon were found in burials there. Lucoes (warriors from Luzon) aided the Burmese king in his invasion of Siam in 1547 AD. At the same time, Lusung warriors fought alongside the Siamese king and faced the same elephant army of the Burmese king in the defense of the Siamese capital at Ayuthaya. The former sultan of Malacca decided to retake his city from the Portuguese with a fleet of ships from Lusung in 1525 AD. (Note: The former sultan of Malacca decided to retake his city from the Portuguese with a fleet of ships from Lusung in 1525 AD.)

Pinto noted that there were a number of them in the Islamic fleets that went to battle with the Portuguese in the Philippines during the 16th century. The Sultan of Aceh gave one of them (Sapetu Diraja) the task of holding Aru (northeast Sumatra) in 1540. Pinto also says one was named leader of the Malays remaining in the Moluccas Islands after the Portuguese conquest in 1511. Pigafetta notes that one of them was in command of the Brunei fleet in 1521. One famous Lucoes is Regimo de Raja, who was appointed by the Portuguese at Malacca as Temenggung (Jawi: تمڠݢوڠ) or Supreme Governor and Chief General. The Lucoes were so commercially and militarily influential that the Portuguese soldier Joao de Barros considered them, "the most warlike and valiant of these parts." Yet among themselves the Lucoes were not united and the Portuguese soldier, Mendes Pinto noted that Muslim and Non-Muslim Lucoes rivaled each other.

== Spanish colonial period (1565–1898) ==
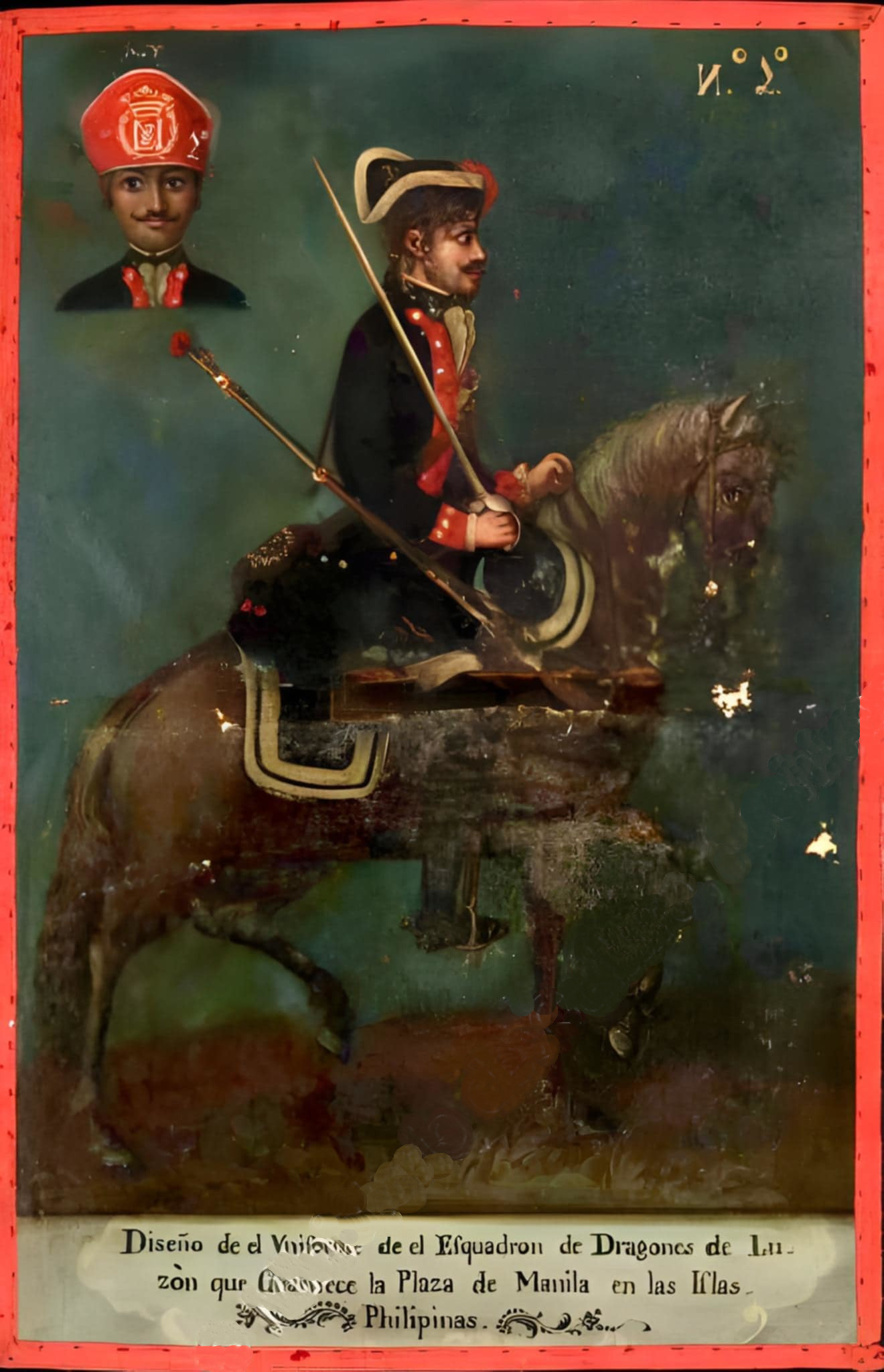
Painting of a Filipino Dragoon 1786, on horseback from the Luzon Squadron (Philippines) Spanish Empire wearing a jacket, waistcoat and breeches, with a red lapel and turn-up.

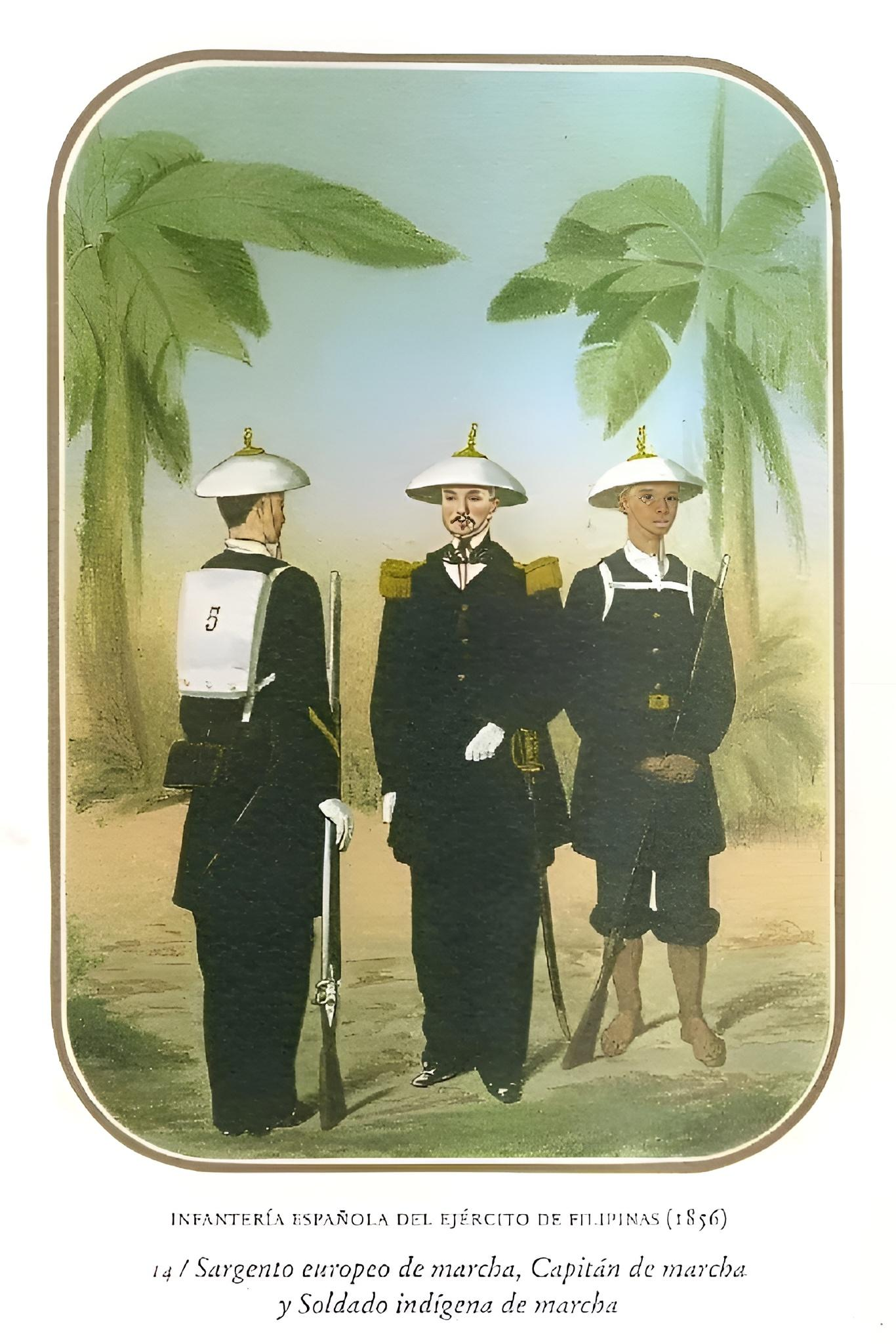
Infantry army unfiorm in the Philippines 1856

=== Early Spanish Conquest ===
- Battle of Manila (1570)
- Battle of Bangkusay Channel
- Siege of Cainta (August 1571)

=== Major Revolts (1567–1872) ===
- Dagami Revolt (1567)
- Tagalog Revolt (1574)
- Pampanga Revolt (1585)
- Tondo Conspiracy (1587)
- Dingras Revolt (1589)
- Cagayan Revolt (1589)
- Magalat Revolt (1596)
- Igorot Revolt (1601)
- Sangley Revolt (1603)
- Caquenga Revolt (1607)
- Irraya or Gaddang Revolt (1621)
- Tamblot Revolt (1621–1622)
- Bankaw revolt (1621–1622)
- Itneg Revolt (1625–1627)
- Ladia Revolt (1643)
- Sumuroy Revolt (1649–1650)
- Maniago Revolt (1660–1661)
- Malong Revolt (1660–1661)
- Almazan Revolt (January 1661)
- Chinese Revolt (1662)
- Panay Revolt (1663)
- Zambal Revolt (1681–1683)
- Dagohoy Rebellion (1744–1829)
- Agrarian Revolt (1745)
- Silang Revolt (1762–1763)
- Palaris Revolt (1762–1765)
- Basi Revolt (1807)
- Novales Revolt (1823)
- Palmero Conspiracy (1828)
- Pule Revolt (1840–1841)
- Cavite Mutiny (1872)

=== Moro campaign (1569–1898) ===
- Battle of Cebu (1569)
- Spanish-Moro Incident (1570)
- Jolo Jihad (1578–1580)
- Cotabato Revolt (1597)
- Spanish-Moro Incident (1602)
- Basilan Revolt (1614)
- Kudarat Revolt (1625)
- Battle of Jolo (1628)
- Sulu Revolt (1628)
- Lanao Lamitan Revolt (1637)
- Battle of Punta Flechas (1638)
- Sultan Bungsu Revolt (1638)
- Mindanao Revolt (1638)
- Lanao Revolt (1639)
- Sultan Salibansa Revolt (1639)
- Corralat Revolt (1649)
- Spanish-Moro Incident (1876)
- Limahong campaign (1574–1576)
- Battle of Manila (1574)

=== Cagayan battles (1582) ===
The 1582 Cagayan battles were a series of clashes between the forces of Colonial Philippines led by Captain Juan Pablo de Carrión and wokou (possibly led by Japanese pirates) headed by Tay Fusa. These battles, which took place in the vicinity of the Cagayan River, finally resulted in a Spanish victory.

=== Eighty Years' War (1568–1648) ===
- Battle of Cavite (1600)
- Moluccas Expedition (1606)
- Siege of Manila (1609–1610)
- Battle of Playa Honda (1617, 1624)
- Formosa Expedition (1626)
- First Battle of San Salvador
- Second Battle of San Salvador
- Battles of La Naval de Manila (1646)
- Battle of Puerto de Cavite (1647)
- Battle of Abucay (1647)

=== Chinese insurrections (1603–1640) ===
- First Chinese Insurrection (1603)
- Second Chinese Insurrection (1639–1640)

=== Seven Years' War (1756–1763) ===
- Battle of Manila (1762)
- Silang Revolt (1762–1763)
  - Diego Silang
  - Gabriela Silang

=== Wars in the Americas (1812–1821) ===
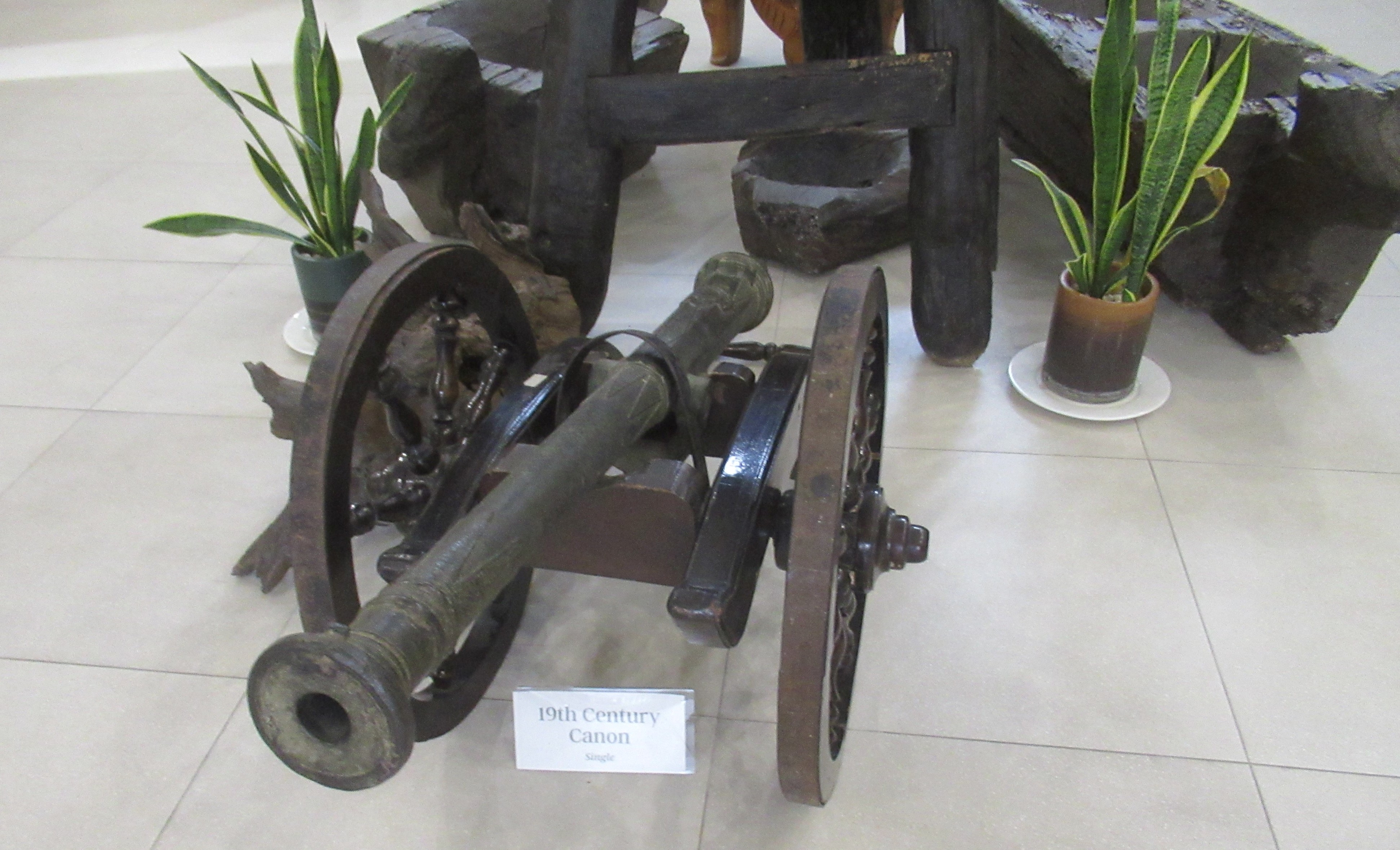
Priceless 19th century cannon

- Overseas Filipinos living in Louisiana served under Jean Lafayette in the Battle of New Orleans during the closing stages of the War of 1812.
- "Manilamen" recruited from San Blas join the Argentinian of French descent, Hypolite Bouchard in the assault of Spanish California during the Argentinian War of Independence.
- Manila-born Ramon Fabié join Miguel Hidalgo in the Mexican War of Independence.
- Filipinos in Mexico serving under the Filipino-Mexican General Isidoro Montes de Oca assisted Vicente Guerrero in the Mexican war of independence against Spain.

=== Cochinchina Campaign (1858–1862) ===
- Siege of Tourane
- Siege of Đà Nẵng
- Siege of Saigon (1859–1861)
- Battle of Kỳ Hòa
- Capture of Biên Hòa

=== Taiping Rebellion (1850–1864) ===
- Some 200-300 Filipinos were recruited by Frederick Townsend Ward as his personal and separate Bodyguard unit under the Ever Victorious Army against the Taiping rebels due to their fighting prowess which they showed during the group's earlier campaigns. A Filipino and a former consulate policeman Vicente Macanaya became Ward's trusted aide-de-camp and was supposed to have succeeded the American after he died in one battle. However, he was later bypassed for promotion in favor of Charles Gordon, a British soldier.

== Philippine Revolution and Declaration of Independence (1896–1898) ==
=== Philippine Revolution (1896–1898) ===
The Armed Forces of the Philippines began with the outbreak of the Philippine Revolution in August 1896, when the Spanish authorities discovered the Katipunan, an anti-colonial secret organization. At the peak of the revolution, some Filipinos and a few Spaniards in the Spanish Army, Guardia Civil, and Navy defected to the Philippine Revolutionary Army. The Katipunan, led by the founder Andres Bonifacio and patriots, was a secessionist movement and shadow government spread throughout much of the islands, and began to influence much of the Philippines taking full advantage of Spanish failures against Cuban nationalists, whose goal was independence advocating independence through armed revolt against Spain through a revolution. During a mass gathering in the city of Caloocan, the members of the Katipunan organized themselves into a revolutionary government, named the newly established government "Haring Bayang Katagalugan", and openly declared a nationwide armed revolution. On August 24, Bonifacio called for a simultaneous coordinated attack and the surrounding towns on the capital Manila. Bonifacio appointed generals to lead rebel forces in Manila. This attack has failed, however, the surrounding provinces began to revolt. In particular, rebels in Cavite led by led by Mariano Álvarez and Baldomero Aguinaldo (who were leaders from two different factions of the Katipunan) won major early victories. A power struggle among the revolutionaries led to a schism among Katipunan leadership followed by Bonifacio's execution in 1897, with command shifting to Aguinaldo who led his own newly formed revolutionary government. That year, the revolutionaries are trucing the Spanish was officially signed the Pact of Biak-na-Bato, which temporarily reduced hostilities. General Aguinaldo and his Filipino revolutionary officers are exiled themselves to the British Hong Kong, though hostilities between Filipino rebels and the Spanish government never actually completely ceased.

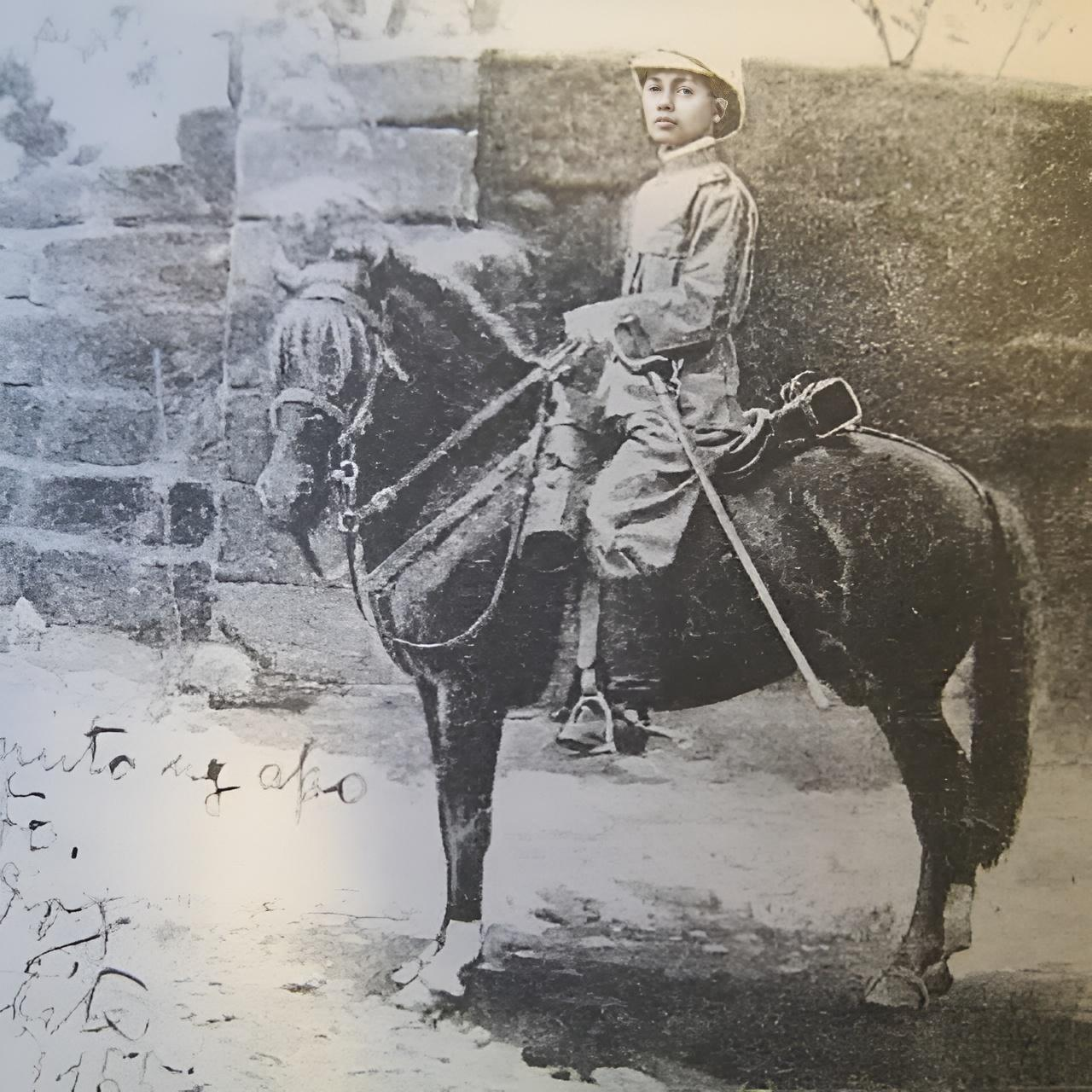
General Emilio Aguinaldo

- Battle of Julian Bridge
- Battle of San Juan del Monte
- Negros Revolution
- Cry of Pugad Lawin
- Battle of Pasong Tamo
- Battle of Manila (1896)
- Battle of Noveleta
- Battle of San Francisco de Malabon
- Kawit revolt
- Battle of Imus
- Cry of Nueva Ecija
- Battles of Batangas
- Battle of San Mateo and Montalban
- Battle of Binakayan-Dalahican
- Battle of Sambat
- Battle of Pateros
- Battle of Kakarong de Sili
- Cry of Tarlac
- Battle of Perez Dasmariñas
- Battle of Zapote Bridge (1897)
- Retreat to Montalban
- Raid at Paombong
- Battle of Aliaga
- Battle of Calamba
- Battle of Alapan
- Battle of Tayabas
- Battle of Tres de Abril
- Siege of Baler
- Siege of Masbate

=== Spanish–American War (1898) ===
The first military action between American and Spanish forces was the 1898 Battle of Manila Bay. Entering the Philippine theater on May 1, 1898, the U.S. Navy's Asiatic Squadron under Commodore George Dewey aboard the USS Olympia defeated Spanish squadron under Admiral Patricio Montojo in a matter of hoursm effectively seizing control of Manila. Dewey's force sustained only a single casualty, a heart attack aboard one of his vessels, and only nine wounded. On May 19, after the battle, Dewey had Filipino leader Emilio Aguinaldo, who had been in exile in Hong Kong transported to Manila. After assuming command of Filipino forces on May 24, Aguinaldo reignited the Philippine Revolution begun in 1896 and initiated land campaigns against the Spanish colonial government. By June 9, Aguinaldo's forces gained control of the provinces of Bulacan, Cavite, Laguna, Batangas, Bataan, Zambales, Pampanga, Pangasinan, and Mindoro, and had laid siege to the Spanish capital in Manila.

On 12 June 1898, Aguinaldo's forces declared the independence of the Philippines. The Declaration was signed by ninety-eight persons, among them an American army officer who witnessed the proclamation. Although this signified the end date of the revolution, neither Spain nor the United States recognized Philippine independence. On August 13, after the 1898 Battle of Manila the Spanish commander, Captain-General Fermin Jaudenes, surrendered the capital to U.S. forces. This battle marked the end of Filipino–American collaboration, as the American action of preventing Filipino forces from entering the captured city of Manila was deeply resented by the Filipinos. The U.S. established a military government in the Philippines and the insurgent First Philippine Republic was formally established with the proclamation of the Malolos Constitution on January 23, 1899. The Spanish rule of the Philippines officially ended with the 1898 Treaty of Paris, which also ended the Spanish-American War. In that treaty, the U.S. agreed to pay US$20 million to the Spanish colonial government and the Spanish government ceded the Philippine Archipelago and other territories to the United States. This put the independence of the newly declared Southeast Asian republic in grave danger and, angered by the betrayal, Filipinos later declared war.

== American colonial period (1899–1941) and Japanese occupation (1942–1945) ==
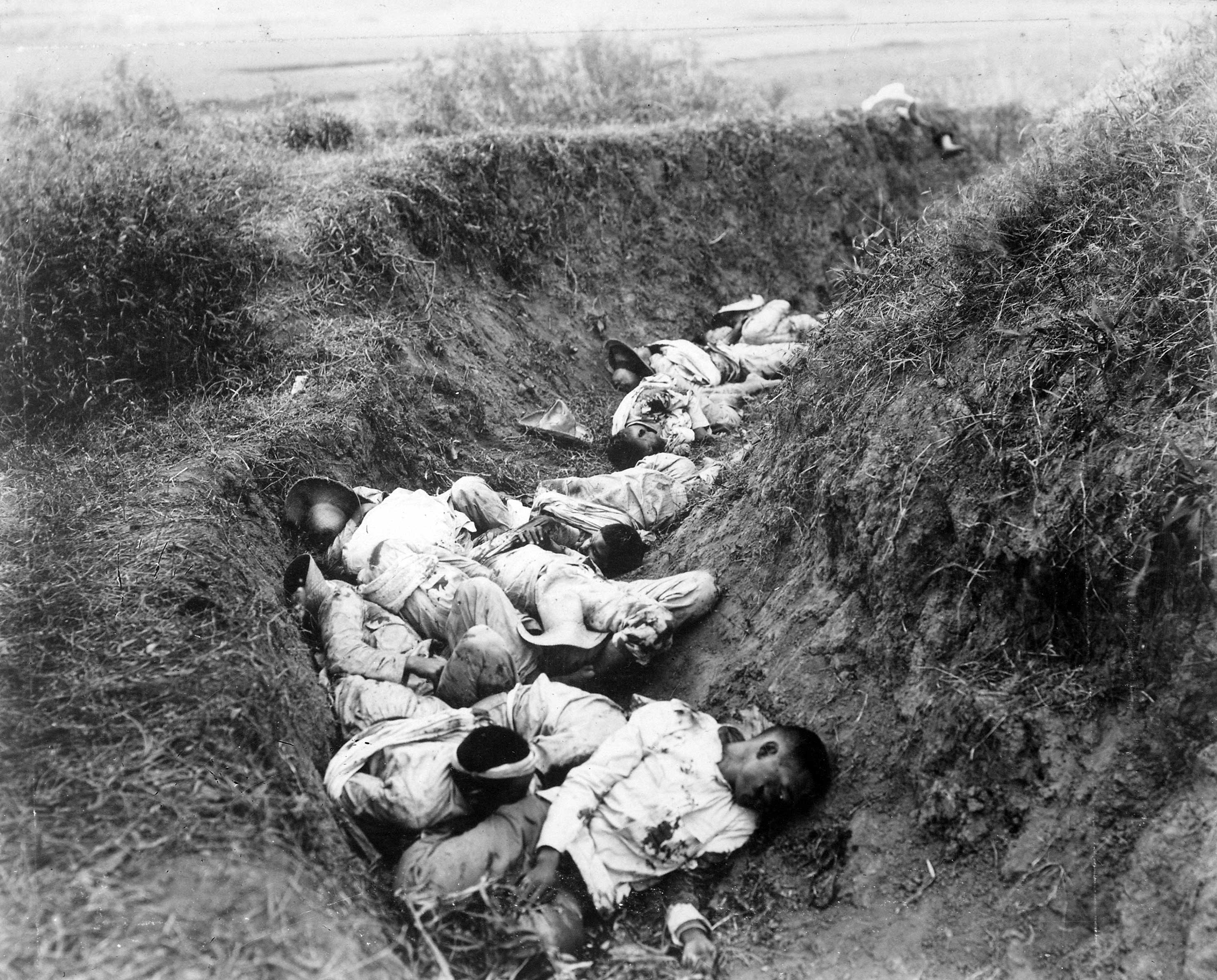
Filipino casualties on the first day of the Philippine-American war

=== Philippine–American War (1899–1913) ===
The Philippine–American War (Note: This conflict is also known as the 'Philippine Insurrection'. This name was historically the most commonly used in the U.S., but Filipinos and some American historians refer to these hostilities as the Philippine–American War, and, in 1999, the U.S. Library of Congress reclassified its references to use this term.) was a conflict between the United States and the First Philippine Republic from 1899 through at least 1902, when the Filipino leadership generally accepted American rule. A Philippine Constabulary organized in 1901 to deal with the remnants of the insurgent movement and gradually assumed the responsibilities of the United States Army. Skirmishes between government troops and armed groups lasted until 1913, and some historians consider these unofficial extensions part of the war.

- Battle of Manila (1899)
- Battle of Caloocan
- Second Battle of Caloocan
- Battle of Balantang
- Capture of Malolos
- Battle of Marilao River
- Battle of Santa Cruz
- Battle of Pagsanjan
- Battle of Paete
- Battle of Quingua
- Battle of Calumpit
- Battle of Santo Tomas
- Battle of Zapote River
- Battle of Olongapo
- Battle of San Jacinto
- Battle of Tirad Pass
- Battle of Paye
- Battle of Cagayan de Misamis
- Siege of Catubig
- Battle of Agusan Hill
- Battle of Makahambus Hill
- Battle of Pulang Lupa
- Battle of Mabitac
- Battle of Lonoy
- Battle of Balangiga
- Battle of Bayang
- Hassan uprising
- Battle of Siranaya
- Battle of Taraca
- Battle of Dolores River
- Battle of the Malalag River
- First Battle of Bud Dajo
- Second Battle of Bud Dajo
- Battle of Bud Bagsak

=== World War I (1914–1918) ===
In 1917 the Philippine Assembly created the Philippine National Guard with the intent to join the American Expeditionary Force. By the time it was absorbed into the National Army it had grown to 25,000 soldiers. However, these units did not see action. The first Filipino to die in World War I was Private Tomas Mateo Claudio who served with the U.S. Army as part of the American Expeditionary Forces to Europe. He died in the Battle of Chateau Thierry in France on June 29, 1918. The Tomas Claudio Memorial College in Morong Rizal, Philippines, which was founded in 1950, was named in his honor.

=== Spanish Civil War (1936–1939) ===
During the Spanish Civil War, Filipino volunteers fought for both sides in the war. Over 1,000 volunteers from other nations served in the Nationalist forces, including Filipino Mestizos, Britons, Finns, Norwegians, Swedes, White Russians, Haitians, Welsh People, Americans, Mexicans, Belgians, Venezuelans, Puerto Ricans, Belgians, Hungarians, Romanians and Turks.

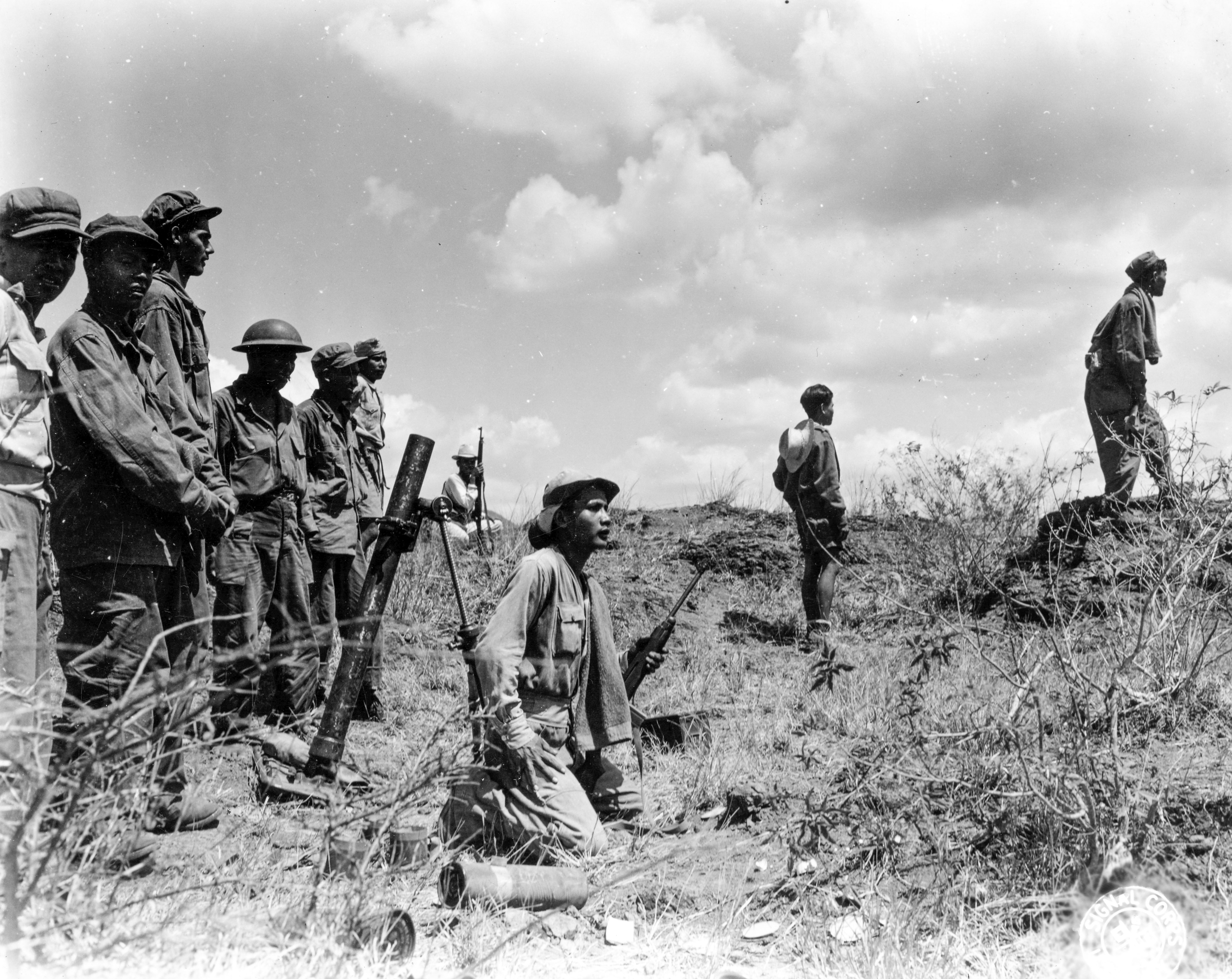
Mortar squad of K Co., 3rd Bn., 15th Regt., Philippine Army. Narvacan, Ilocos Sur, Luzon 3 April 1945

=== World War II (1941–1945) ===
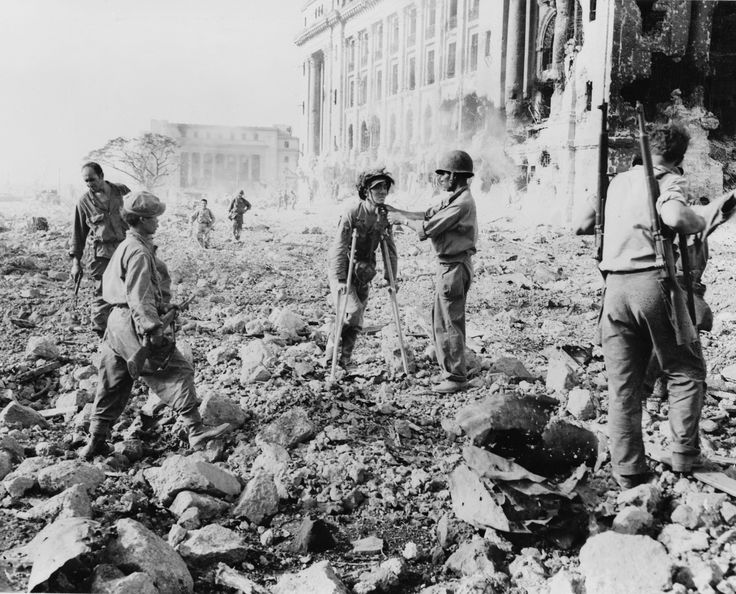
Wounded Japanese troops surrender to US and Filipino soldiers in Manila, 1945

The first Filipino military casualty during the Second World War was serving as an aviator with British forces. First Officer Isidro Juan Paredes of the Air Transport Auxiliary was killed on November 7, 1941, when his aircraft overshot a runway and crashed at RAF Burtonwood. He was buried at Great Sankey (St Mary) Churchyard Extension, but later repatriated to the Philippines. Paredes Air Station in Ilocos Norte, was named in his honor.

- Philippines campaign (1941–1942)
- Japanese invasion of Batan Island
- Japanese invasion of Vigan
- Japanese invasion of Aparri
- Japanese invasion of Legazpi
- Japanese invasion of Lingayen Gulf
- Japanese invasion of Lamon Bay
- Battle of Bataan
- Battle of Corregidor
- Philippine resistance against Japan
- Philippines campaign (1944–1945)
- Battle of Leyte
- Battle of Leyte Gulf
- Battle off Samar
- Battle of Ormoc Bay
- Battle of Mindoro
- Battle of Maguindanao
- Invasion of Lingayen Gulf
- Battle of Luzon
- Battle of Bessang Pass
- Raid at Cabanatuan
- Battle of Bataan (1945)
- Battle of Manila (1945)
- Battle of Corregidor (1945)
- Battle of Baguio (1945)
- Raid on Los Baños
- Invasion of Palawan
- Battle of Mindanao
- Battle of Visayas
- Battle for Cebu City
- Battle of Davao
- Battle of Mayoyao Ridge

World War II Veterans are members of the following:

- United States Armed Forces Far East (USAFFE)
- United States Army Forces in the Philippines – Northern Luzon (USAFIP-NL)
- Philippine Scouts (PS)
- Philippine Constabulary (PC)
- Philippine Commonwealth Army (PCA) also known as the Commonwealth Army of the Philippines (CAP)
- Recognized Guerrilla Units (Philippine Commonwealth)

Related articles:

- Second Philippine Republic
- Japanese war crimes
- Bataan Death March
- Comfort women
- Hukbalahap

== Korean War (1950–1953) ==
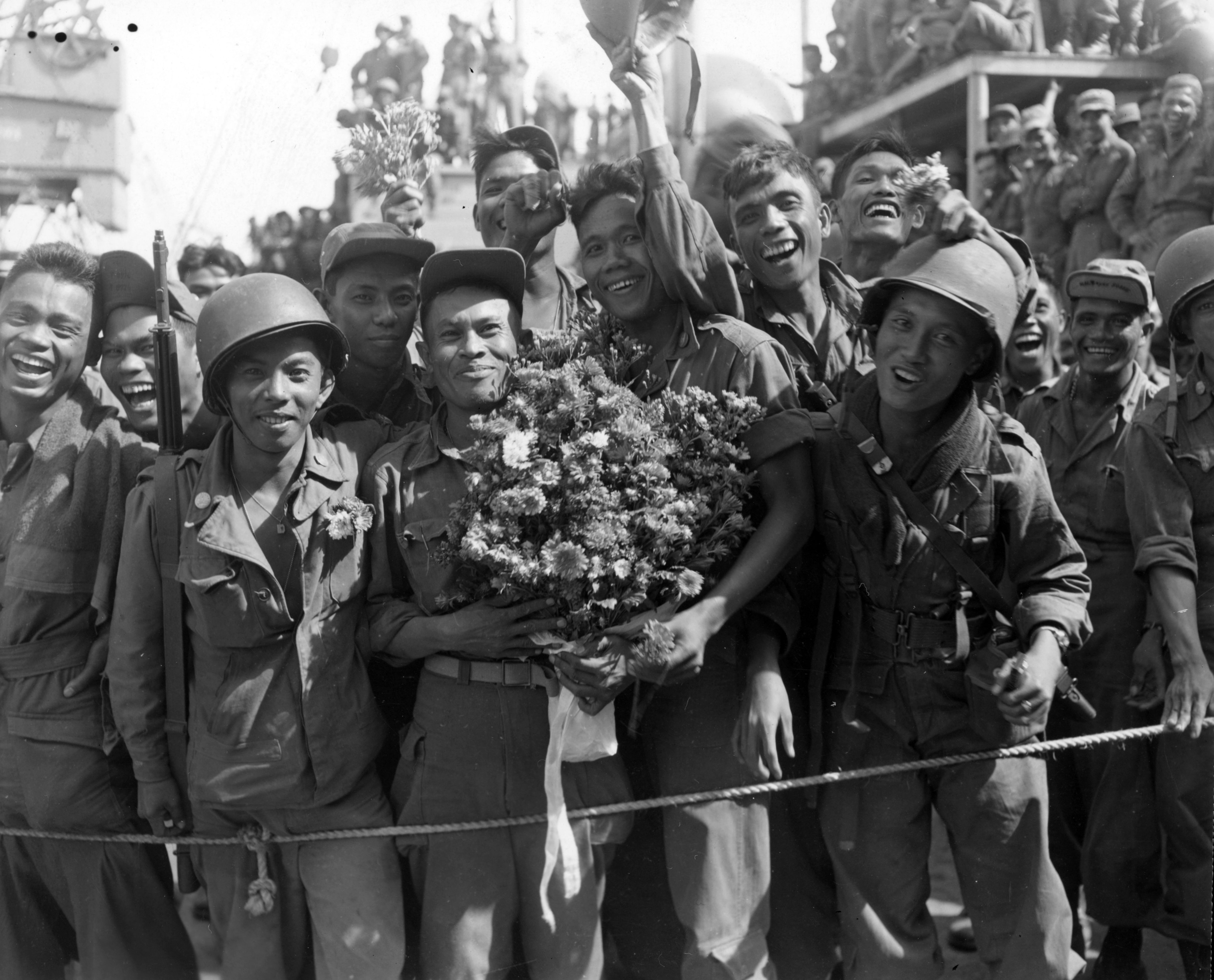
PEFTOK troops arriving at Pusan, September 1950

The Philippines joined the Korean War in August 1950. The Philippines sent an expeditionary force of around 7,500 combat troops. This was known as the Philippine Expeditionary Forces To Korea, or PEFTOK. It was the 4th largest force under the United Nations Command then under the command of US General Douglas MacArthur that were sent to defend South Korea from a communist invasion by North Korea which was then supported by Mao Zedong's China and the Soviet Union. The PEFTOK took part in decisive battles such as the Battle of Yultong, Battle of the Imjin River, and the Battle of Hill Eerie. This expeditionary force operated with the United States 1st Cavalry Division, 3rd Infantry Division, 25th Infantry Division, and 45th Infantry Division.

- Operation Tomahawk
- Operation Ripper (The Fourth Battle of Seoul)
- Battle of Bloody Ridge
- Battle of Christmas Hill
- Battle of Miudong
- Battle of Yultong
- Battle of Arsenal Hill (Hill 191)
- Battle of Iron Triangle
- Battle of the Imjin River
- Battle of Heartbreak Ridge
- Battle of Hill Eerie

== Vietnam War (1964–1969) ==
The Philippines was involved in the Vietnam War, supporting civil and medical operations. Initial deployment in 1964 amounted to 28 military personnel, including nurses, and 6 civilians. The number of AFP battalion troops who served in Vietnam swelled to 182 officers and 1,882 enlisted personnel during the period 1966–1968. Some 10,450 Philippine Armed Forces troops were dispatched to South Vietnam and primarily supported medical and other civilian pacification projects. These forces operated under the designation A or Philippine Civic Action Group - Vietnam or PHILCAG-V. Nine Filipinos were killed in the conflict. Filipino troops withdrew from Vietnam on December 12, 1969. AFP units were also sent at the same time to the Spratly Islands. The naval base at Subic Bay was used for the U.S. Seventh Fleet from 1964 until the end of the war in 1975. Subic Bay and Clark Air Base achieved maximum functionality during the war, as well as supporting an estimated 80,000 locals in allied tertiary businesses that ranged from shoe making to prostitution.

== EDSA Revolution (February 22–25, 1986) ==
On February 22, 1986, former Defense Minister Juan Ponce Enrile and Armed Forces of the Philippines (AFP) Vice Chief of Staff and chief of the Philippine Constabulary (PC) (now the Philippine National Police) Lt. Gen. Fidel V. Ramos withdrew their support for President Ferdinand Marcos and led the EDSA Revolution by Corazon Aquino (Ninoy's widow). On February 25, 1986, Corazon Aquino was sworn in as the 11th president of the Philippines. Marcos and his family were ousted from power by a combination of the military, people and church members to end the 20-year dictatorship of Marcos.

== Persian Gulf War (1990–1991) ==
The Philippines sent 200 medical personnel to assist coalition forces in the liberation of Kuwait from the stranglehold of Iraq then led by Saddam Hussein.

== Iraq War (2003–2004) ==
The Philippines sent 60 medics, engineers and other troops to assist in the invasion of Iraq. The troops were withdrawn on the 14th of July, 2004, in response to the kidnapping of Angelo dela Cruz, a Filipino truck driver. When insurgent demands were met (Filipino troops out of Iraq), the hostage was released. While in Iraq, the troops were under Polish command (Central South Iraq). During that time, several Filipino soldiers were wounded in an insurgent attack, although none died.

== Communist rebellion in the Philippines ==
Early 1950s to present

- Hukbalahap
- New People's Army
- National Democratic Front

== Moro conflict ==
Late 1960s to present

- Moro National Liberation Front
- Moro Islamic Liberation Front
- Abu Sayyaf Conflict
  - The Burnham Hostage Crisis
  - The Maundy Thursday Rescue
- Rajah Sulaiman movement
- Maute group (ISIS)

== See also ==
- Armed Forces of the Philippines
- Philippine Air Force
- Philippine Navy
- Philippine Marine Corps
- Philippine Army
- Philippine Constabulary
- Military History of the Philippines during World War II
- History of the Philippines
- Presidential Security Group / Presidential Security Command
- Filipino Special Forces
- General Alfredo M. Santos – the first four-star general of the Philippine Army and the Armed Forces of the Philippines (1963)
- Philippine National Police
- Reform the Armed Forces Movement
- Reserve Officers' Training Corps (Philippines)
- Katipunan
- Philippine Revolutionary Army
- Philippine Commonwealth Army
- Luna sharpshooter
- List of conflicts in the Philippines
- List of wars involving the Philippines
