= Magalat revolt =

Revolt

The Magalat revolt (Spanish: La Revuelta del Magalat) was an uprising in the Philippines in 1596, led by Magalat, one of the few Filipino rebels from Cagayan. He had been arrested in Manila for inciting rebellion against the Spanish, and after he was released on the importunities of some Dominican priests, he returned to Cagayan. Together with his brother, he incited the whole country to revolt. He was said to have committed atrocities upon his fellow natives for refusing to rise up against the Spaniards. He soon controlled the countryside, and the Spanish eventually found themselves besieged.

The Spanish Governor-General Francisco de Tello de Guzmán, sent Pedro de Chaves from Manila with Spanish and Filipino colonial troops. They fought successfully against the rebels, and captured and executed several leaders under Magalat. Magalat himself was assassinated within his fortified headquarters by his own men, who apparently had been promised a reward by the Spaniards.

== See also ==
- Philippine Revolts Against Spain
- Military History of the Philippines
