= Igorot revolt =

- Date: November 1601
- Location: Caraballo Mountains north of modern-day Pantabangan, Nueva Ecija
- Result: Igorot victory

Parties
| Spanish Empire; Local Kapampangan troops | Igorot groups; Bontoc; Ibaloi; Ifugao; Ibilao |

Lead figures
| Francisco de Tello de Guzmán; Mateo de Aranda † | Unknown |

Number
| 50 | 3,000 |

Casualties and losses
| Heavy | Unknown |

The Igorot revolt of 1601 (Filipino: Aklasan ng mga Igorot) was a failed expedition in 1601 by Spain in an attempt to subjugate and Christianize the Igorot people of northern Luzon, in the Philippines. The term "revolt" is a misnomer owing to the independence of the Igorots at the time. The Spanish colonial government considered themselves the legitimate government in the entire Philippines and considered any resistance to be illegal.

On November 1601, Governor-General Francisco de Tello de Guzmán sent Lieutenant Mateo de Aranda with Spanish and Filipino colonial troops. The Spaniards were determined to convert the Igorots to Christianity. Another reason for their desire to colonize the Igorots were the presence of gold and the tobacco monopoly in the Cordillera region, which the Igorots typically use for ornament and trading.

The expedition was ambushed by 3,000 Igorot warriors who were prepared for a military response, foiling the expedition. Over the next three centuries, Spain would undertake more expeditions into the Cordillera region, with minimal success.

== Background ==
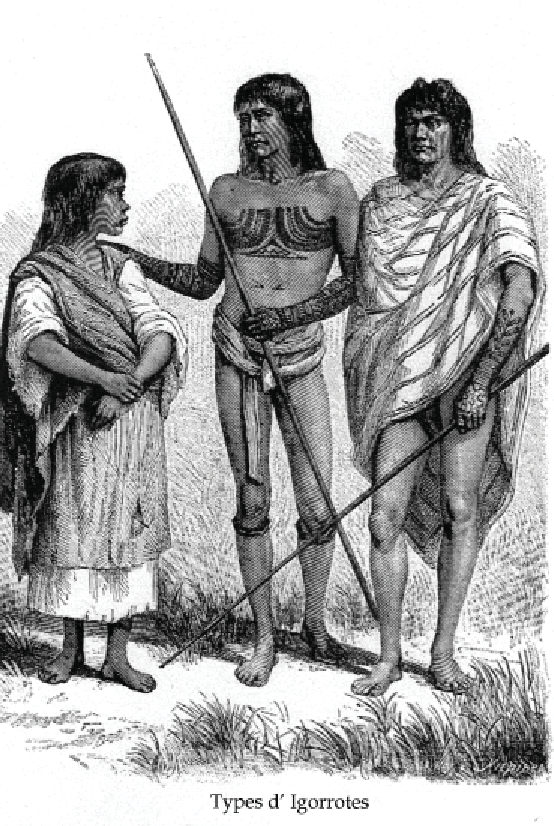
Illustration of Igorot people during the 19th century

Spanish colonization of the Philippines began in earnest in 1565 with the first colonies established by Miguel López de Legazpi. Spanish colonization was a slow process, mostly concentrated first in Cebu before moving on to Manila and the surrounding area. By 1600, the Spanish colonial administration was concentrated around the lowland areas.

The Spaniards were particularly interest in the indigenous Igorot people for their gold. Lopez de Legazpi had heard of mines in Ilocos as early as months after first setting foot on Philippine soil in February 1565. His grandson, Juan de Salcedo, launched an expedition to northern Luzon in search of that gold in 1571 but was unsuccessful. Attempts to reach the Cordillera Mountains continued in the 1580s and 1590s, with four expeditions sent between 1591 and 1594 resulting ins some villages along the Magat River welcoming the Spaniards and offering tribute.

Igorot people living in mountainous areas posed a challenge to Spanish monopolization of gold deposits. The gold mines in the Gran Cordillera Central were firmly inside Igorot territory. Prior to Spanish conquest, the Igorot miners and traders enjoyed a relationship with lowland peoples in Ilocos and Pangasinan; a trade network which continued as late as 1745.

The societal disruption caused by Spanish colonization also disrupted Igorot society, which resulted in frequent headhunting raids by mountaineer highlanders against lowlander refugees. The Spanish were drawn to local wars between Igorot mountaineers and tributary lowlanders.

Parallel to this, religious orders proselytized among tributary villages, seeking to convert Filipinos to Catholicism. The Igorot people, who naturally resisted religious conversion, were branded as pagans and were viewed as "natural enemies" of the Spaniards.

== 1601 expedition ==
In November 1601, Governor-General Francisco de Tello de Guzmán wished to pacify the eastern region of the Pampanga (now parts of Nueva Ecija) through bloodless means before resorting to a military intervention. He chose Fray Esteban Marin, the prior of Laoag, Batac, and Bantay for the mission.

Marin was an Augustinian friar with a long history of proselytizing to mountaineer peoples. He entered the Caraballo Mountains through Gapan accompanied by only one servant and armed with only a cross. While trying to persuade a village in Pantabangan, he was lassoed from behind and tied to a tree trunk, before he was killed due to either strangulation or being shot by arrows. He was then decapitated, his servant killed, and his body burned.

When news of Marin's death reached the Spaniards, they sent Lieutenant Mateo de Aranda to attack the Igorots. Aranda took 50 Spanish soldiers to meet the Igorots, but were ambushed by 3,000 Igorots, decimating them.

== Aftermath ==
The decisive Igorot victory taught the Spaniards that they could not subjugate the Zambal, Tingguian, and Igorot peoples by force of arms alone. In 1606, the Spaniards called on lowland peoples from Ilocos and Pangasinan to take up arms and enslave the Igorot people.

The Spaniards would never come to completely control the interior of the Cordillera Mountains, and were considered functionally independent. The Spanish repeatedly launched attacks into Igorot territory over the years but were always repelled.

The Spanish government begrudgingly had to accept Igorot independence. In 1662, Governor-General Diego de Salcedo admitted that the mountains of Ilocos and Pangasinan were inhabited by the Igorots, who were the "owners of the gold mines and enemies of the Christians." In 1779, a Spanish official noted that leaving "Igorot crimes" unpunished was "a shameful thing for our nation ... and a mockery and cause for laughter among other foreigners." Governor-General Fernando Primo de Rivera, a century later, also noted that it was "humiliating for Spain" for Igorot peoples to "not only live in pre-Christian backwardness, but commit crimes even to the extent of collecting tribute from Christian towns themselves without receiving any punishment for their boldness."

Igorot independence was substantially challenged when the Spanish colonial government sent Colonel Guillermo Galvey through Benguet, Lepanto, Bontoc, and Ifugao in 1829–1839. Benguet would be the first Igorots to be officially listed as Spanish subjects, followed by Lepanto and Bontoc in 1859.

The last Spanish census of 1898 noted 120,444 pagans recognizing vassalage to the King of Spain. Despite this, Spanish control was tenuous, owing to repeated incidents of attacks by Igorot people against Spanish garrisons.

== See also ==
- Philippine revolts against Spain
- Military history of the Philippines
