= Palmero Conspiracy =

Failed plot to overthrow the Spanish colonial government in the Philippines

- Part of the Philippine revolts against Spain
Date	1828
Location	Philippines
Result	Spanish victory

Belligerents
Spain	Philippine creoles

The Palmero Conspiracy is the name given to a failed plot to overthrow the Spanish colonial government in the Philippines 1828. The Spanish government suppressed further information on this conspiracy.

== Background ==
In 1823, a Spanish order declared that military officers commissioned in Spain would take precedence over those appointed in the colonies. This was the reaction of Madrid to the series of wars against Spanish rule that was known as the Spanish American wars of independence. Many Creole military officers were outranked by their Peninsular counterparts.

An insurgency was staged by a Creole captain named Andrés Novales, but was suppressed when Fort Santiago did not yield to Novales and his 800 men. Madrid did not notice the growing disaffection in the Philippines, the last major Spanish colony in Asia. In 1828, matters worsened when Peninsulars replaced public officials, primarily provincial governors.

== Conspiracy ==
In 1828, two Palmero brothers, scions of a prominent clan in the Philippines, along with the other partisans from the military and the civil service, planned to seize the government. The Palmeros were so well-known (one of their most famous descendants was Marcelo Azcárraga Palmero) that when the Spanish government discovered the plan, they decided it would be best to keep it hidden from the public. The main conspirators were forced to flee.
