= Dagami revolt =

Revolt against Spanish colonial rule in the Philippines

The Dagami revolt (Spanish: La Revuelto del Dagami) was a revolt against Spanish colonial rule in the Philippines. It was led by Datu Dagami of Gabi (present-day Palo). The revolt actually began in 1565, but is sometimes dated as 1567, the year of Dagami's execution.

== History ==
On May 22, 1565, a party of 16 led by Dagami and four other datus hid themselves outside of the stockaded Spanish settlement in Sugbo, intending to kill some Spaniards. At dawn of the following day, May 23, Pedro de Arana, a member of the personal company of Spanish Governor Miguel López de Legazpi, came out of the fort alone. As he walked along the beach near the war party, they speared him and cut off his head. They returned to Gabi and made a great celebration and feast with it. The murder went unsolved at the time, and Dagami continued as Datu of Gabi and continued to foment revolt.

In December 1566, after two Spaniards were killed and three others nearly died inside the fort after drinking poisoned wine purchased from Sugbuhanon wine-sellers, Legazpi sent for Rajah Tupas and his fellow datus, alleging that some of them were behind the killings. The datus protested their innocence, and Legazpi told them that their guilt could only be absolved by handing over the culprits. The following day, Tupas handed over two women whom, under torture, implicated two others. Three of the four were sentenced to flogging and deportation, and the fourth sentenced to death. The condemned woman was executed and her body was drawn and quartered, with the pieces of the body displayed along the road between the Cebuano settlement and the Spanish fort. The following day, Tupas betrayed Dagami to Legazpi.

Dagami was condemned to be drawn and quartered the next day in the place where Pedro de Arana had been killed. Dagami's head was displayed on a pole in that place and the four quarters of his body were displayed on poles along the beach. After this was carried out, Tupas lauded Dagami as having been among the proudest in the islands, and said that when they were thinking of making peace with the Spaniards in 1565 had advised him not to make peace, had hindered him from doing that and that after the signing of the Treaty of Cebu, Dagami continued to be rebellious against the Spaniards and in favor of revolts and war to gain independence.

== See also ==
- Philippine revolts against Spain
- Military History of the Philippines
