= Philippine revolts against Spain =

List of rebellions in the Philippines during Spanish colonial rule (1565–1898)

During the Spanish colonial period in the Philippines (1565–1898), dozens of revolts against the Spanish colonial government were made by Indios, Moros, Lumad, Chinese (Sangleys), and Insulares (Filipinos of full or near full Spanish descent), often with the goal of re-establishing the traditional rights and powers of their respective communities. Some revolts stemmed from land disputes, most of which transpired in the agricultural provinces of Batangas, Ilocos sur, Cavite, and Laguna. Natives also rebelled over unjust taxation and forced labor.

Most of these revolts failed because the majority of the local population sided up with the well-armed colonial government, and to fight with Spanish as foot soldiers to put down the revolts.

In Mindanao and Sulu, a continuous fight for sovereignty was sustained by the Moro people and their allies for the whole duration of Spanish conquest and rule.

== 16th century ==
=== Dagami Revolt (1565–1567) ===
The Dagami Revolt was a revolt led by Datu Dagami of Gabi (present day Palo), Leyte in 1567. It was accompanied by 16 other people and was short-lived, mainly involving the assassinations of Spanish soldiers. The first incident took place on May 23, 1565 in Cebu, where the group ambushed Pedro de Arana, the aide to Miguel López de Legazpi, the Spanish Governor of the Philippines. Dagami subsequently led a series of attacks, which baffled authorities for a time. By December 1566, Legazpi finally summoned the local datus and forced them to identify who the culprits were after two more Spaniards died of poisoning. Dagami was captured rigil.

=== Manila-Tondo Revolt, Mindoro Mutiny, & Lakandula-Sulayman Revolt (1574) ===
During the 1574 Battle of Manila against Chinese pirate king Limahong's forces, three revolts erupted in neighboring Tondo, the nearby island of Mindoro, and in response to these two, Butas (present-day Navotas), which was notably led by Lakandula, former Lakan of Tondo, and Sulayman, former Rajah of Manila.

In the Manila-Tondo revolt, the people of Manila robbed the houses of Spaniards in Intramuros and maltreated the slaves, while the people of Tondo massacred some newly Christianized locals in a convent. Meanwhile, several datus in Mindoro revolted and abducted the local friars left behind to the mountains to be held hostage, waiting for the results of the battle and anticipating to kill them upon Limahong's victory.

Worried of taking blame for these events, Lakandula and Sulayman withdrew to Butas and established a war camp with their forces and allies from neighboring regions to revolt against legal injustices incurred by the reigning Governor-general Guido de Lazevaris, who revoked their tax exemptions and other special privelages previously granted by Miguel Lopez de Legazpi.

=== Pampanga Revolt (1585) ===
The Pampanga Revolt was an uprising in 1585 by some native Kapampangan leaders who resented the Spanish landowners, or encomenderos, who had deprived them of their historical land inheritances as tribal chiefs or datus.

In 1583, Kapampangans were forced to work in the goldmines of Ilocos and not allowed to return in time for the planting season, causing a severe food shortage and eventual famine, leading to mass deaths throughout Pampanga in 1584.

In response, local leaders throughout Pampanga plotted a revolt which included a plot to storm Intramuros, but the conspiracy was foiled before it could even begin after a Filipino woman married to a Spanish soldier reported the plot to the Spanish authorities. Spanish and Filipino colonial troops were sent by Governor-General Santiago de Vera, and the leaders of the revolt were arrested and summarily executed by Christian Cruz-Herrera.

=== Tondo Conspiracy (1587–1588) ===
The Tondo Conspiracy, or the Conspiracy of the Maginoos, of 1587–1588, was a plot by the kin-related noblemen, or datus, of Manila and some towns of Bulacan and Pampanga. It was led by Agustin de Legazpi, nephew of Lakandula, and his first cousin, Martin Pangan. The datus swore to revolt. The uprising failed when they were denounced to the Spanish authorities by Antonio Surabao (Susabau) of Calamianes, in Palawan.

=== Revolts Against the Tribute (1589) ===
The Cagayan and Dingras Revolts Against the Tribute occurred on Luzon in the present-day provinces of Cagayan and Ilocos Norte in 1589. Ilocanos, Ibanags, and other Filipinos revolted against alleged abuses by the tax collectors, including the collection of high taxes. It began when six tax collectors who had arrived from Vigan were killed by the natives. Governor-General Santiago de Vera sent Spanish and Filipino colonial troops to pacify the rebels. The rebels were eventually pardoned and the Philippine tax system reformed.

=== Magalat Revolt (1596) ===
The Magalat Revolt was an uprising in 1596, led by Magalat, a rebel from Cagayan. He had been arrested in Manila for inciting rebellion against the Spanish. He was later released after some urging by some Dominican priests, and returned to Cagayan. Together with his brother, he urged the entire country to revolt. He was said to have committed atrocities against his fellow natives for refusing to rise up against the Spaniards. He soon controlled the countryside, and the Spanish eventually found themselves besieged. The Spanish Governor-General Francisco de Tello de Guzmán sent Pedro de Chaves from Manila with Spanish and Filipino colonial troops. They fought successfully against the rebels, and captured and executed several leaders under Magalat. Magalat himself was assassinated within his fortified headquarters by his own men.

== 17th century ==
=== Igorot Revolt (1601) ===
By order of the Governor-General Francisco de Tello de Guzmán an expedition was sent to the Cordillera region for religious conversion purposes with the aid of Padre Esteban Marin. Marin, the curate of Ilocos at that time, tried initially to convince the Igorots to convert peacefully to Catholicism. Marin allegedly even tried to create his own dictionary in the Igorot language to advance this cause. The Igorots, however, killed Marin and the Governor-General sent Lt. Mateo de Aranda with Spanish and Filipino foot soldiers. The combined force would be defeated although the Spanish would continue using harsher tactics (including slavery) to force the Igorots to submit. Nonetheless, the Igorots would continue to defy and defeat Spanish expeditions in the years 1608, 1635, and 1663.

=== The Chinese Revolt of 1603 ===
In 1603, at least 30,000 Chinese merchants were slaughtered and in Luzon, Chinese officials and civilians were killed without authority by what The Ming Shi-lu (明實錄, Míng shílù) describes as the barbarian Spanish chieftain of Luzon during that time. The surviving Chinese fled to Wawa, or what is now known as Guagua, this atrocity is known in Chinese history as the Luzon Tragedy (吕宋惨案, Lǚ sòng cǎn àn). The Chinese inhabitants of Manila set fire to Legarda and Binondo and for a time threatened to capture the Moro stronghold in Intramuros.

=== Caquenga's Revolt (1607) ===
In 1607, with the coming of the Dominicans into the Cagayan Valley, a priest began proselyting to the Malaueg people of Nalfotan, now Rizal, Cagayan. An animist priestess named Caquenga rebelled against the coming of the Catholic Church. She gathered people from her village and fled to the mountains to unite with another village and prepared for war. A Dominican friar and loyal Malaueg men successfully quelled the forthcoming rebellion, and Caquenga was given over to the other village as a slave. However, many of her followers rebelled, burned down a Catholic church, and started other rebellions throughout the Cagayan Valley. One rebel, who desecrated an image of the Virgin Mary, was executed for his offense.

=== Tamblot uprising (1621–1622) ===
The Tamblot uprising, was a religious uprising in the island of Bohol, led by Tamblot in 1621. The Jesuits first came to Bohol in 1596 and eventually governed the island and converted the Boholanos to the Catholic faith. Tamblot, a babaylan or native priest, urged his fellow Boholanos to return to the old belief of their forefathers. The revolt began on the day when the Jesuits were in Cebu, celebrating the feast day of St. Francis Xavier. It was finally crushed on New Year's Day, in 1622. Tamblot was executed and his head was set on a pike and displayed to serve as a warning to the populace.

=== Bankaw (Bancao) Revolt (1621–1622) ===
The Bankaw Revolt was a religious uprising against Spanish colonial rule led by Bancao, the datu of Carigara, in the present-day Carigara in Leyte. Bankaw had warmly received Miguel López de Legazpi as his guest, when he first arrived in the Philippines in 1565. Although baptized as a Catholic in his youth, he abandoned this faith in later years. With a babaylan, or religious leader named Pagali, he built a temple for a diwata or local goddess, and pressed six towns to rise up in revolt. Similar to the Tamblot Uprising, Pagali used magic to attract followers, and claimed that they could turn the Spaniards into clay by hurling bits of earth at them.

Governor-General Alonso Fajardo de Entenza sent the alcalde mayor of Cebu, Juan de Alcarazo, with Spanish and foot soldier colonial troops, to suppress the rebellion. Bankaw's severed head was impaled on a bamboo stake and displayed to the public as a stern warning. One of his sons was also beheaded, and one of the babaylans was burned at the stake. Three other followers were executed by firing squad. Other historical sources/accounts reports The Bankaw Revolt as the first recorded uprising against foreign colonization. The (1621–1622) dates may be inaccurate. Carigara was known only a decade after Magellan landed in "Mazaua" (believed to be Limasawa) in 1521. The uprising may well have taken place towards the end of the 16th century.

=== Itneg Revolt (1625–1627) ===
The Itneg Revolt, or the Mandaya Revolt, was a religious uprising led by Miguel Lanab and Alababan. The two were previously baptized as Catholics against their will and were from the Itneg or Mandaya tribe of Capinatan, in northwestern Cagayan, in the Philippines. The region is now part of the landlocked province of Apayao. Miguel Lanab and Alababan killed, beheaded, and mutilated two Dominican missionaries, Father Alonzo Garcia and Brother Onofre Palao, who were sent by the Spanish colonial government to convert the Itneg people to Christianity. After cutting Father Garcia's body into pieces, they fed his flesh to a herd of pigs. Afterwards, they compelled their fellow Itnegs to loot, desecrate Catholic images, set fire to the local churches, and escape with them to the mountains.

In 1626, Governor-General Fernándo de Silva sent Spanish and foot soldier colonial troops to suppress the rebellion. They destroyed farms and other sources of food to starve the Itnegs, and forced them to surrender in 1627.

=== Ladia Revolt (1643) ===
Pedro Ladia was a Moro Bornean and a self-claimed descendant of Lakandula who came to Malolos in 1643. At that time, his land was confiscated by the Spanish and he thought that it was about time that they stage an uprising and put himself as King of the Tagalogs. This was despite the fact that a parish priest tried to convince him not to pursue his plans. Upon his capture, he was brought to Manila where he was executed.

=== Sumuroy Revolt (1649–1650) ===
In the town of Palapag, today in Northern Samar, Agustin Sumuroy, a Waray, and some of his followers rose in arms on June 1, 1649, over the polo y servicio or forced labor system being undertaken in Samar. This is known as the Sumuroy Revolt, named after Agustin Sumuroy.

The government in Manila directed that all natives subject to the polo are not to be sent to places distant from their hometowns to do their forced labor. However, under orders of the various town alcaldes, or mayors, the Waray were being sent to the shipyards of Cavite to do their polo, which sparked the revolt. The local parish priest of Palapag was murdered and the revolt eventually spread to Mindanao, Bicol, and the rest of the Visayas, especially in places such as Cebu, Masbate, Camiguin, Zamboanga, Albay, Camarines, and parts of northern Mindanao, such as Surigao. A rebel government was successfully established in the mountains of Samar. Eventually, continuous defeats caused the rebels to mutiny against Sumuroy and eventually beheaded him. His head was sent to the Spanish authorities. This incident led to the downfall of the revolt and fellow leaders Don Juan Ponce and Don Pedro Caamug also surrendered shortly thereafter.

=== Maniago/Pampanga Revolt (1660–1661) ===
The Maniago Revolt was an uprising in Pampanga during the 1660s named after its leader, Francisco Maniago. During that time, Pampanga drew most of the attention from the Spanish religious orders because of its relative wealth. They also bore the burden of more tribute, forced labor, and rice exploitation. They were made to work for eight months under unfair conditions and were not paid for their labor and for the rice purchased from them. Their patience was put to the limit and they signified their intention to revolt by setting their campsite on fire. The fight soon began and because the Spaniards were busy fighting against the Dutch, they were badly depleted by the Kapampangans. The Maniago revolt was the start of a much bigger and even bloodier revolt in Pangasinan. This battle was led by a man named Andres Malong who had heeded the call of Maniago to revolt against the Spaniards. After hearing news of a Kapampangan chief siding with the Spaniards, Maniago and his forces arranged for a meeting with Governor-General Sabiniano Manrique de Lara in which they gave their conditions to end their rebellion. Appeased and satisfied with the conditions of the agreement, the Governor-General accepted the demands after which Maniago and his forces gave up the rebellion.

=== Malong Revolt (1660–1661) ===
Andres Malong was the maestro de campo of Binalatongan - now San Carlos City - in Pangasinan in the 1660s. He assisted many Spaniards in governing different towns in Pangasinan, and as such, had learned and was trained to use force and cruelty. He hoped of being the King of the province, however, set this plan aside when a war, led by Francisco Maniago, broke out in Pampanga.

Malong started his campaign in a small barangay called Malunguey, but failed. Having the same condition as in Pampanga, he led the people in Pangasinan to take up arms against the Spaniards. It spread like wild fire in Pangasinan. Because of his success, he proclaimed himself King of Pangasinan.

=== Almazan Revolt (January 1661) ===
A part of the chain to the Malong Revolt was the Ilocos Revolt led by Don Pedro Almazan, illustrious and wealthy leader from San Nicolas, Laoag, Ilocos Norte. The letters sent by Don Andres Malong ("King of Pangasinan") narrating the defeat of the Spaniards in his area and urging other provinces to rise in arms failed to obtain any support among the natives. During the revolt, Don Pedro Almazan proclaimed himself "King of Ilocos", but was later captured and executed. He also had a son which the Ilocanos proclaimed their prince.

=== Chinese Revolt of 1662 ===
Fearing an invasion of Chinese led by the famous pirate Koxinga, the garrisons around Manila were reinforced. An increasing anti-Chinese sentiment grew within much of the population. In the end, the invasion did not materialize, but many locals massacred hundreds of Chinese in the Manila area.

=== Panay Revolt (1663) ===
The Panay Revolt was a religious uprising in 1663 that involved Tapar, a native of the island of Panay, who wanted to establish a religious cult in the town of Oton, Iloilo. He attracted some followers with his stories about his frequent conversations with a demon. Tapar and his men were killed in a bloody skirmish against Spanish and colonial foot soldier troops and their corpses were impaled on stakes.

=== Zambal Revolt (1681–1683) ===
A group of chieftains from Zambales had refused to accept the authority of the Crown over their realm and staged a revolt. The Spanish were very swift to respond and sent a colonial force of 6,000 foot soldiers to suppress the uprising. After 2 years of conflict, the Spanish had pacified the entire area of Zambales and all of the chieftains who participated in the revolt were executed.

== 18th century ==
=== Dagohoy Rebellion (1744–1825) ===
In 1744 in what is now the province of Bohol, what is known today as the Dagohoy Revolt was undertaken by Francisco Dagohoy and his followers. This revolt is unique since it is the only revolt completely related to matters of religious customs, unlike the Tamblot Uprising before it, which was not a complete religious rebellion.

After a duel in which Dagohoy's brother died, the local parish priest refused to give his brother a proper Catholic burial, since dueling is excommunicable by the Church. The refusal of the priest eventually led to the longest revolt ever held in Philippine history: 85 years. It also led to the establishment of a free Boholano government. Twenty governors-general, from Juan Arrechederra to Mariano Ricafort Palacin y Abarca, failed to stop the revolt. Ricafort himself sent a force of 2,200 foot soldiers to Bohol, which was defeated by Dagohoy's followers. Another attack, also sent by Ricafort in 1828 and 1829, failed as well. Dagohoy died two years before the revolt ended, though, which led to the end of the revolt in 1829. Some 19,000 survivors were granted pardon and were eventually allowed to live in new Boholano villages: namely, the present-day towns of Balilihan, Batuan, Bilar (Vilar), Catigbian, and Sevilla (Cabulao).

=== Agrarian Revolt of 1745 ===
The Agrarian Revolt was a revolt undertaken between the years 1745 and 1746 in much of the present-day Calabarzon (specifically in Batangas, Laguna, and Cavite) and in Bulacan, with its first sparks in the towns of Lian and Nasugbu in Batangas. Indigenous landowners rose in arms over the land grabbing of Spanish friars or Catholic religious orders, with native landowners demanding that Spanish priests return their lands on the basis of ancestral domain.

The refusal of the Spanish priests resulted in much rioting, resulting in massive looting of convents and arson of churches and ranches. The case was eventually investigated by Spanish officials and was even heard in the court of Ferdinand VI in which he ordered the priests to return the lands they seized. The priests were successfully able to appeal the return of lands back to the natives, which resulted in no land being returned to native landowners.

=== Silang Revolt (1762–1763) ===
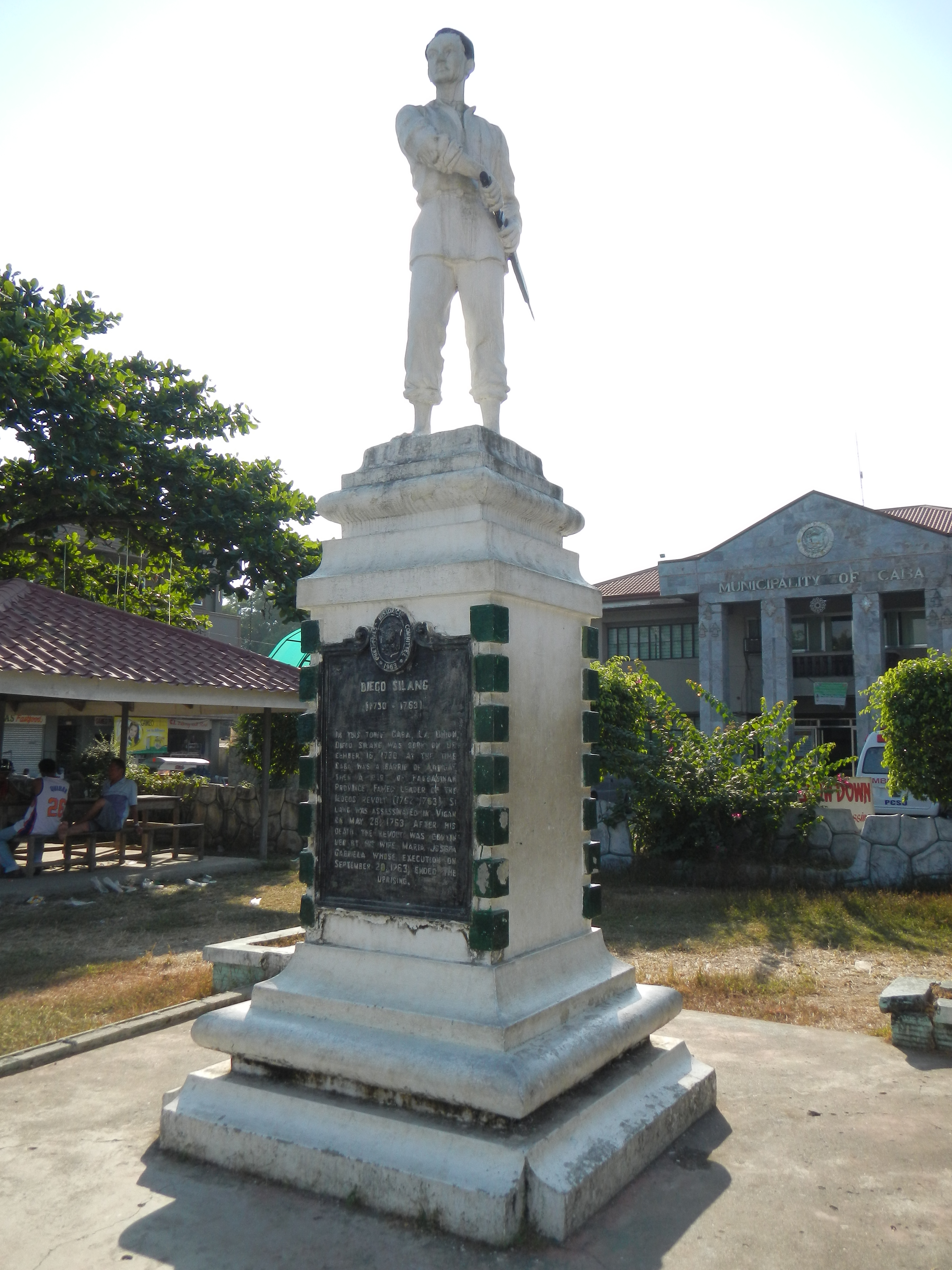
Diego Silang statue in his birthplace, Caba, La Union

Arguably one of the most famous revolts in Philippine history is the Silang Revolt from 1762 to 1763, led by the couple Diego Silang and Gabriela Silang. Unlike the other revolts, this revolt took place during the British occupation of Manila. On December 14, 1762, Diego Silang declared the independence of Ilocandia, naming the state "Free Ilocos" and proclaimed Vigan the capital of this newly independent state. The British heard about this revolt in Manila and even asked the help of Silang in fighting the Spanish.

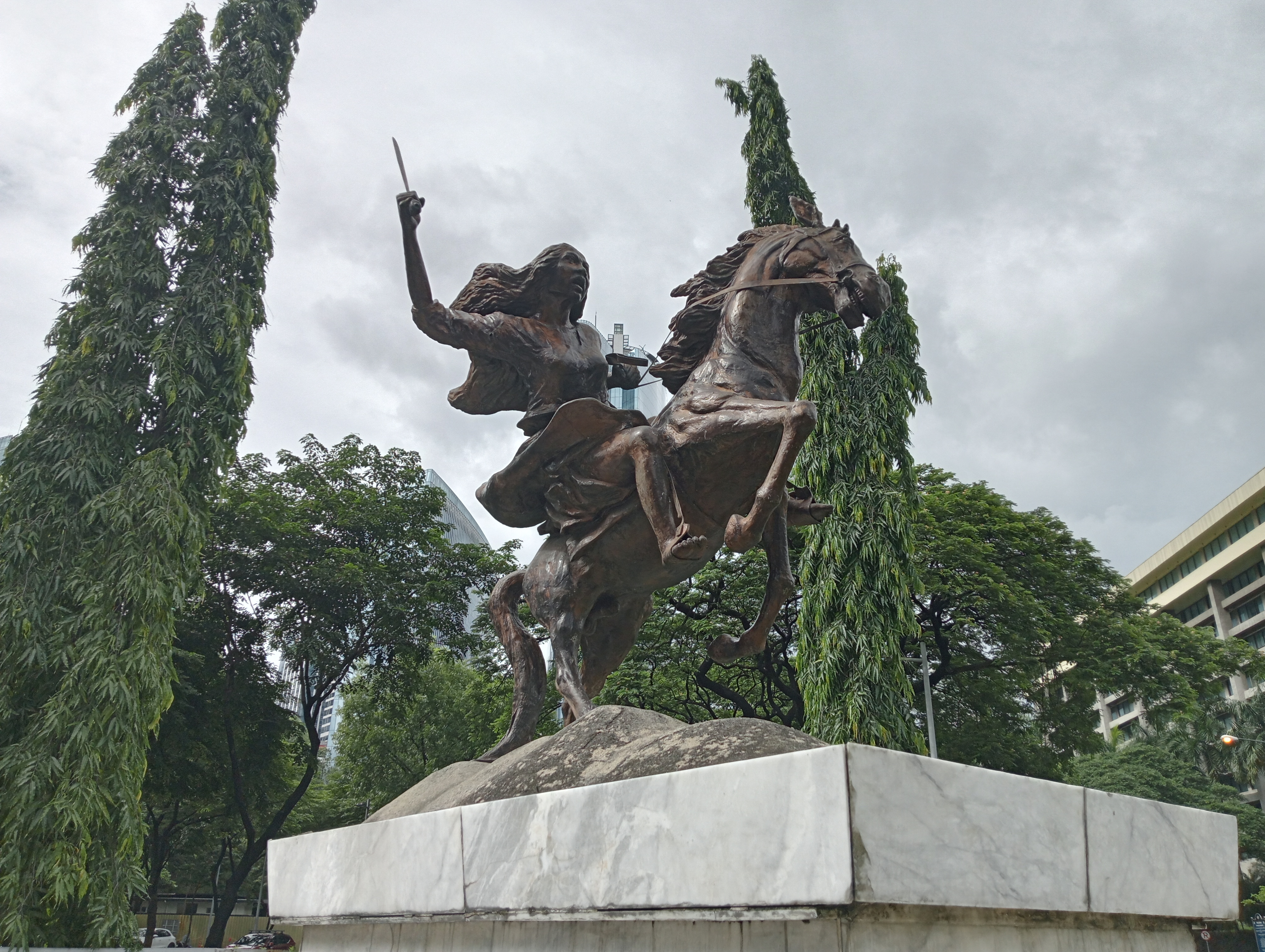
Gabriela Silang Monument, Ayala Triangle, Makati City

However, Silang was killed on May 28, 1763, by Miguel Vicos, a friend of Silang. The Spanish authorities paid for his murder, leading to his death in the arms of his wife, Gabriela. She continued her husband's struggle, earning the title "Joan of Arc of the Ilocos" because of her many victories in battle. The battles of the Silang revolt are a prime example of the use of divide et impera, since Spanish troops largely used Kapampangan soldiers to fight the Ilocanos.

Eventually, the revolt ended with the defeat of the Ilocanos. Gabriela Silang was executed by Spanish authorities in Vigan on September 10, 1763.

=== Palaris Revolt (1762–1764) ===
During the British invasion of Manila during the Seven Years' War, the Spanish colonial government, including Villacorta, had relocated to Bacolor in the province of Pampanga, which was then adjacent to Pangasinan. It was at this time that the principalia of Binalatongan protested the abuses committed by the provincial governor. The town leaders demanded that the governor be removed and that the colonial government stop collecting taxes since the islands were already under British control at that time. But Governor-General Simon de Anda dismissed the demands and the revolt broke out in November 1762. The name of de la Cruz, who began to be known as Palaris, emerged as one of the leaders of the revolt, along with his brother Colet, Andrés López, and Juan de Vera Oncantin.

By December, all Spanish officials, except the Dominican friars who were in charge of the Catholic mission, had left Pangasinan. The Spanish colonial government had to deal with the British and the simultaneous Silang Revolt, led by Diego Silang, in the neighboring province of Ilocos in the north. (The present-day province of La Union was still part of Pangasinan and Ilocos.) At the battle of Agno, he faced on March 1, 1763, the Spanish forces under the command of Alfonso de Arayat, who led a composite troop of Spanish soldiers and Indios loyal to Spain. Arayat withdrew after losing much of his Indio loyalists. Pangasinenses took over all official functions and controlled the province up to the Agno River, the natural boundary between Pangasinan and neighboring Pampanga in the south. (The present-day province of Tarlac was still part of Pampanga.) At the height of the uprising, Palaris commanded 10,000 men. He was also in communication with Silang, with whom he was coordinating a bigger offensive against the Spanish.

However, the Seven Years' War ended on February 10, 1763, with the signing of the Treaty of Paris. Also, Silang was assassinated on May 28, 1763, by an Indio under the employ of the friars. The Spanish were then able to focus on the uprising and mustered forces to surround Palaris. The Spanish friars, who were allowed to stay in the province, also started a campaign to persuade Pangasinan residents of the futility of the Palaris Revolt.

By March 1764, most of the province had already fallen, leaving Palaris no escape route except through Lingayen Gulf and the South China Sea in the west. He chose to stay in Pangasinan and hid among his supporters. But his presence terrified his protectors and his own sister Simeona, who was apparently threatened by the Spanish clergy, betrayed him to Agustín Matias, the gobernadorcillo (mayor) of the razed Binalatongan. Palaris was arrested on January 16, 1765, and brought to the provincial capital of Lingayen for trial. While in detention, he confessed to being the principal leader of the revolt. He was convicted and hanged on February 26, 1765.

== 19th century ==
=== Basi Revolt (1807) ===
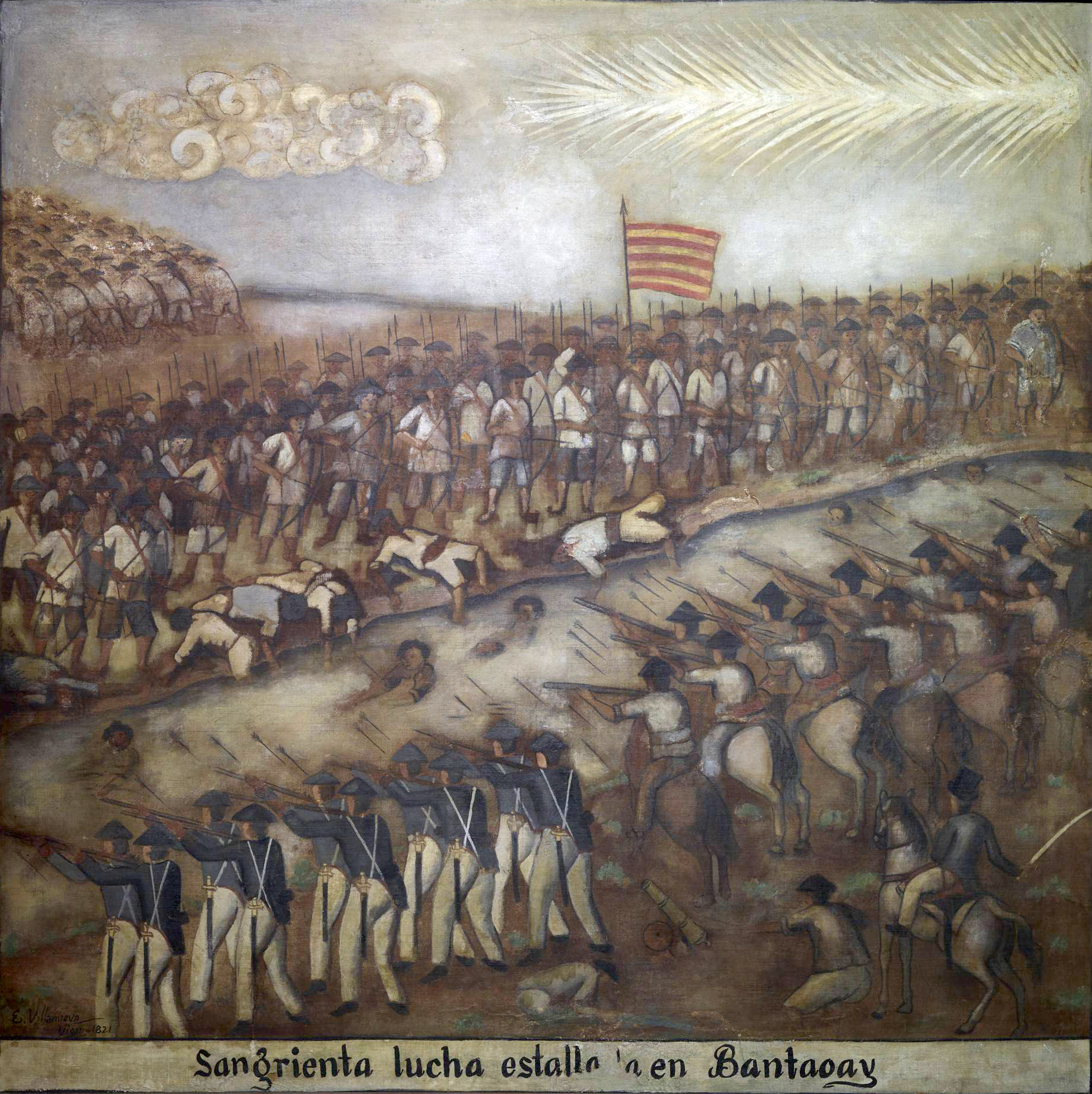
A bloody war between the Ilocanos and the local Spanish army breaks out in Bantaoay

The Basi Revolt, also known as the Ambaristo Revolt, lasted from September 16 to 28, 1807. It was led by Pedro Mateo and Salarogo Ambaristo (though some sources refer to a single person named Pedro Ambaristo), with its events occurring in the present-day town of Piddig in Ilocos Norte. This revolt is unique as it revolves around the Ilocanos' love for basi, or traditional sugarcane wine. Basi wine held significant cultural and societal importance for the Ilocanos, being integral to rituals surrounding childbirth, marriage, and death.

Basi Revolt of 1807

In 1786, the Spanish colonial government expropriated the manufacture and sale of basi, effectively banning private manufacture of the wine, which was done before expropriation. Ilocanos were forced to buy from government stores. However, wine-loving Ilocanos in Piddig rose in revolt on September 16, 1807, with the revolt spreading to nearby towns and with fighting lasting for weeks. Spanish-led troops eventually quelled the revolt on September 28, 1807, albeit with much force and loss of life on the losing side. A series of 14 paintings on the Basi Revolt by Esteban Pichay Villanueva currently hangs at the Ilocos Sur National Museum in Vigan City. The event is immortalized and commemorated in the Basi Revolt Monument located along the highway of Piddig.

=== Novales Revolt (1823) ===
Andrés Novales, a Filipino captain in the Spanish Army, grew discontented with the way Spanish authorities treated the criollos and the mestizo soldiers stationed in the Philippines (suspected of supporting revolts after the Latin American Wars of Independence). His discontentment climaxed when peninsulares arrived at the Philippines to replace officers suspected of rebellion. He found the sympathy of many criollos, including Filipino nationalist Luis Rodríguez-Varela. As punishment for the rising sense of discontentment, many military officers and public officials were exiled. One of them was Novales, exiled to Mindanao to fight the Moros.

However, Novales secretly returned to Manila. On the night of June 1, 1823, he along with some subordinates in the King's Regiment, composed mainly of Mexicans with some creoles and mestizos from the now independent nations of Colombia, Venezuela, Peru, Chile, Argentina and Costa Rica, started a revolt. Along with 800 indigenous natives in which his sergeants recruited, they seized the royal palace, the Manila Cathedral, the city's cabildo (city hall), and other important government buildings in Intramuros.

Failing to find Governor-General Juan Antonio Martínez, the rebels killed the lieutenant governor and former governor-general, Mariano Fernandez de Folgueras. Folgueras had suggested that Spain replace criollo officers with peninsulares. The rebels shouted Viva el Emperador Novales, "Long live the Emperor Novales!". Surprisingly, the townsfolk followed Novales and his troops as they marched into Manila. They eventually failed to seize Fort Santiago because Andrés' brother Mariano, commanding the citadel, refused to open its gates. Spanish authorities rushed soldiers to the fort and caught Novales hiding under the Puerta Real.

At 5:00 pm on June 2, Novales and 21 sergeants were executed by firing squad in a garden near Puerta del Postigo. In his last minutes, Novales declared that he and his comrades shall set an example of fighting for freedom. Mariano was initially to be executed for being Andrés' brother, but the crowd pleaded for his freedom with the argument that he had saved the government from being overthrown. Mariano received a monthly pension of ₱14 but went mad after the execution.

=== Palmero Conspiracy (1828) ===
The Palmero Conspiracy in 1828 was a failed plot to overthrow the Spanish colonial government in the Philippines. The Spanish government suppressed further information on this conspiracy. In 1823, an order was from Spain declared that military officers commissioned in the Peninsula (Spain) should have precedence of all those appointed in the Colonies. This was the reaction of Madrid to the series of wars against Spanish rule that was known as the Spanish American wars of independence; Many Criollo military officers were outranked by their Peninsular counterparts.

In 1828, matters became worse when public officials, mainly provincial governors, were also being replaced by Peninsulares. In the same year, two Palmero brothers, members of a prominent clan in the Philippines, along with other people from both the military and the civil service, planned to seize the government. Such was the prominence of the Palmeros, one of whose most famous descendants was Marcelo Azcárraga Palmero, that when the Spanish government discovered the plan, they thought it would be wise not to report it to the public. The plot itself would embarrass the government since the conspirators were Spaniards themselves and it would seem that Spaniards themselves would want to overthrow the power of Spain in the country. The main conspirators were exiled.

=== Pule Revolt (1840–1841) ===
One of the most famous religious revolts is the Pule Revolt, more formally known as the Religious Revolt of Hermano Pule (Spanish: Revuelta religiosa del Hermano Pule). Undertaken between June 1840 and November 1841, this revolt was led by Apolinario de la Cruz, otherwise known as "Hermano Pule". De la Cruz started his own religious order, the Confraternity of Saint Joseph (Spanish: Confradia de San José) in Lucban, located in the present-day province of Quezon (then called Tayabas), in June 1840. However, there were two types of priests in the Philippines then: secular priests, or parish priests, which were usually Indio, and religious priests, or convent priests, which were usually Spanish. Due to the concentration of Spanish religious power and authority in the already-established religious orders (the Augustinians, Jesuits, and Franciscans to name a few) and the concept that Filipino priests should only stay in the church and not the convent and vice versa (although this was not always followed), the Spanish government banned the new order, especially due to its deviation from original Catholic rituals and teachings, such as prayers and rituals which inculcated paganic practices. However, thousands of people in Tayabas, Batangas, Laguna and even Manila already joined. Because of this, the Spanish government sent in troops to forcibly break up the order, forcing De la Cruz and his followers to rise in armed revolt in self-defense. Many bloody battles were fought with the order's last stand in Mount San Cristobal, near Mount Banahaw, in October 1841. The Spaniards eventually won, and Apolinario de la Cruz was executed on November 4, 1841, in the then-provincial capital, Tayabas.

=== Tayabas Regiment Revolt (1843) ===
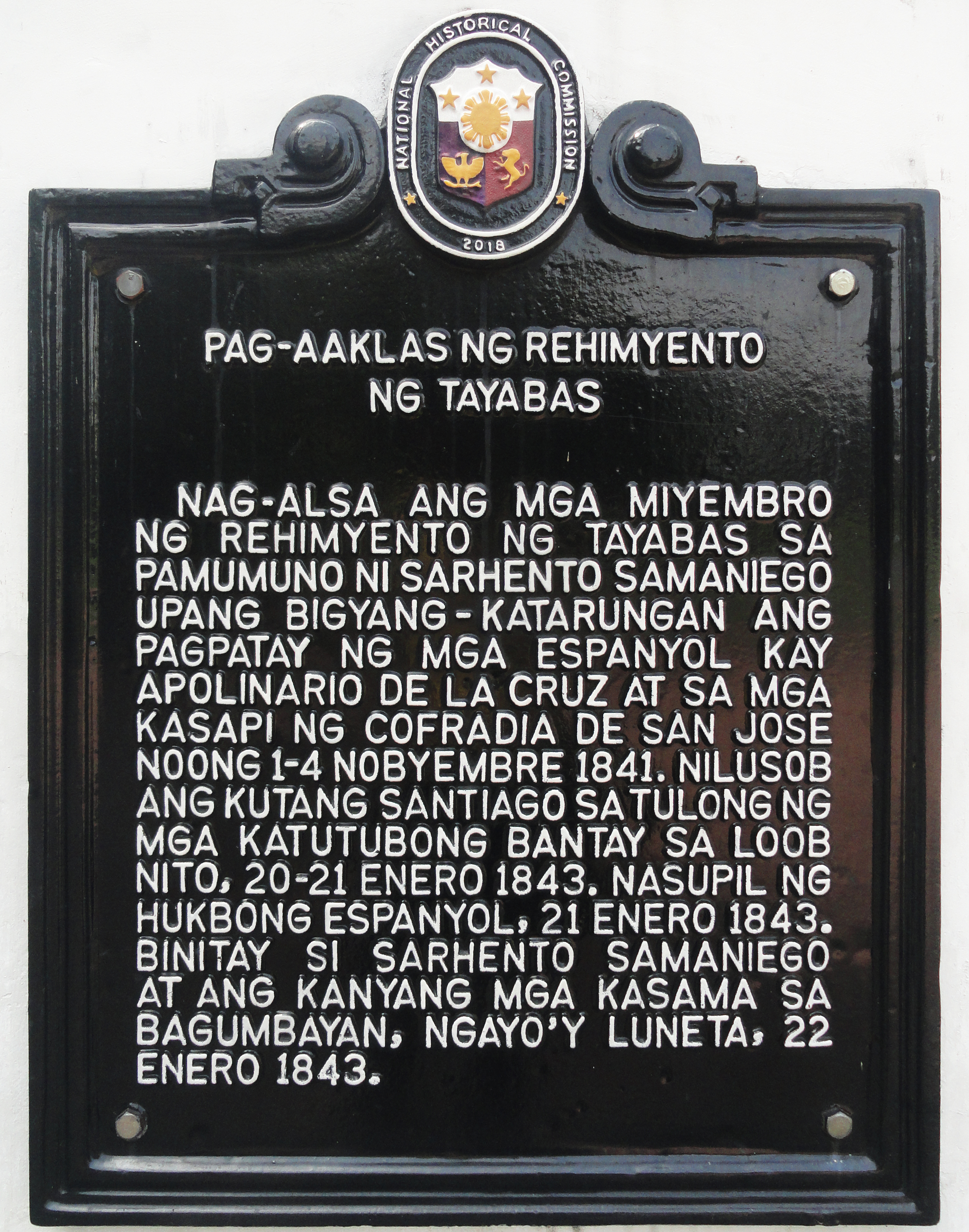
Tayabas Regiment Revolt NHCP historical marker

Years after the Cofradia Revolt, on January 20, 1843, the Tayabas Regiment, led by Sergeant Irineo Samaniego, rose in revolt against Spain in retaliation to the killings by the Spanish army of hundreds of old men, women, and children in Alitao on November 1, 1841. The launched uprising conquered Fort Santiago and other areas of Intramuros. This is the only native force in Philippine history to successfully capture Fort Santiago and Manila. For the first time, the word "Independence" was shouted by the Tayabas Regiment, encouraging their countrymen to revolt against Spain. The next day, however, the gates of Fort Santiago were opened by loyalist soldiers. After a bloody battle, the mutineers were defeated by loyalist troops, resulting in the execution of Samaniego and 81 of his followers the same day.

=== Cavite Mutiny (1872) ===
Flag of the 1872 Cavite Mutiny

The Cavite Mutiny (Motín de Cavite) of 1872 was an uprising of military personnel of Fuerte San Felipe, the Spanish arsenal in Cavite, Philippines on January 20, 1872. Around 200 soldiers and laborers rose up in the belief that it would elevate to a national uprising. The mutiny was unsuccessful, and government soldiers executed many of the participants and began to crack down on a burgeoning nationalist movement. Many scholars believed that the Cavite mutiny was the beginning of Filipino nationalism that would eventually lead to the Philippine Revolution.

== See also ==
- History of the Philippines (1521–1898)
- Military History of the Philippines
- Battles of Manila
- Battles of the Philippines
