= Francisco de Tello de Guzmán =

10th Governor and Captain-General of the Philippines
- In office July 14, 1596 – May 1602
- Monarchs: Philip II of Spain; Philip III of Spain
- Governor: (Viceroy of New Spain); Gaspar de Zúñiga, 5th Count of Monterrey
- Preceded by: Luis Pérez Dasmariñas
- Succeeded by: Pedro Bravo de Acuña

Personal details
- Born: 1532 Spain
- Died: April 1603 (aged 70–71) Manila

Francisco de Tello de Guzmán (sometimes Francisco Tello de Guzmán; 1532-April 1603) was Spanish governor of the Philippines from July 14, 1596 to May 1602. He was a knight of the Order of Santiago.

== Early life and appointment as governor ==
Francisco de Tello de Guzmán was a native of Seville. He became a knight in the Order of Santiago and treasurer of the India House of Trade. He was named governor and captain general of the Philippines by a royal decree dated November 26, 1595. He entered Manila and took up his position on July 14, 1596.

== As governor ==
Despatches from New Spain ordering the reestablishment of the Audiencia of Manila (which had been dissolved some years before) arrived in Manila in May 1598. Governor Tello was named its governor; Doctor Antonio de Morga and Licentiates Christoval Telles Almaçan and Alvaro Rodriguez Zambrano, auditors; and Licentiate Geronymo de Salazar, fiscal. This Audiencia was constituted May 5, 1598.

Fray Ignacio de Sanctivañes, the first archbishop of Manila arrived by the same ships, in May 1598, but he died of dysentery in August of that year. The first suffragan bishops also began arriving in 1598. One of these was Fray Pedro de Agurto, bishop of Sanctisimo Nombre de Jesus, was a native of New Spain. The Jesuit seminary of San José was founded in 1601.

In 1598, Tello sent Juan Zamudio to China in order to establish a trade port there like the Portuguese did in Macau. This resulted in El Piñal being granted to the Spanish, but the Portuguese in Macau reacted violently and attacked the Spanish there. El Piñal was abandoned two years later.

On December 14, 1600, a Spanish fleet under the command of Doctor Antonio de Morga fought two Dutch pirate ships at Cavite. In an intense, six-hour hand-to-hand battle between the two flagships (the San Diego and the Mauritius), the Spanish ship was sunk and defenders of the Dutch ship were mostly killed and the ship set on fire. It did, however, manage to limp to Borneo with a skeleton crew. (This is based on the account of Morga himself. The Dutch account accused him of incompetence and cowardice.) The San Diego lost perhaps 350 sailors and soldiers.

Also in 1600, two merchant ships left Manila for New Spain: the flagship Sancta Margarita, with Juan Martínez de Guillestigui as general, and the San Geronimo, under Don Fernando de Castro. On their way, both ships met with storms in the latitude of 38° and at 600 leguas from the Philippines, and suffered great hardship. After nine months at sea, after many of the men had died and much of the merchandise had been thrown overboard, the San Geronimo put back to the Philippines, off the islands of Catenduanes, outside of the channel of Espiritu Santo, and there was wrecked, although the crew was saved. The flagship "Sancta Margarita, after the death of the general and most of the crew, ported at the Ladrones Islands (Guam) and anchored at Zarpana. There natives who went to the ship, seeing it so abandoned and battered, boarded and took possession of it, and of its goods and property. The few men whom they found alive, they took away to their settlements, where they killed some and apportioned others to various villages, where they maintained them and gave them better treatment.

=== The war in Mindanao ===
Shortly after he had taken over the government, Tello received news of the death of Estevan Rodríguez de Figueroa in Mindanao. Juan de la Xara wrote that he had taken over the conquest and pacification of the island that Rodríguez had been in charge of. However, it was learned that Xara was depriving the heirs of Rodríguez of their inheritance, and that he intended to ignore the authority of the governor in Manila. When Xara left his camp and traveled to Oton, he was arrested and sent to Manila for trial. He died during the course of the trial. Tello sent Captain Toribio de Miranda to Mindanao, and he reestablished royal authority in the camp of Xara.

Mindanao at this time was only partially conquered. Rodríguez de Figueroa had signed an agreement to complete the conquest at his own expense, but with his death the agreement lapsed. The treasury of the colony was depleted, but Governor Tello nevertheless decided to take over the conquest at government expense. He sent General Juan Roquillo to take charge.

Upon his arrival, Roquillo took command of the Spanish camp and fleet, which he found in Tampacan. He confirmed the peace and friendship with the chiefs and people of Tampacan and Lumaguan, restored and set in better order the Spanish settlement and fort, and began to make preparation for the war against Buhahayen. He spent many days in making a few incursions into their land and attacks on their forts, but without any notable result. The enemy were many and all good soldiers, with plenty of arquebuses and artillery, and had fortified themselves in a strong position. They had many other fortifications inland and went from one to the other with impunity, whenever they wished, and greatly harassed the Spaniards, who were little used to so swampy a country. The latter found themselves short of provisions without the possibility of getting them in the country on account of the war.

Don Juan Ronquillo, seeing that the war was advancing very slowly and with little result, and that the camp was suffering, drew up a report of it. He wrote to inform Governor Tello that it would be better to withdraw the camp from Mindanao River, so that it might not perish; and that a presidio could be established on the same island in the port of La Caldera, which could be left fortified, in order not to abandon this enterprise entirely, and so that their friends of Tampacan and Lumaguan might be kept hostile to the people of Buhahayen. Meanwhile, he and the rest of the camp and fleet would return to Manila, if permitted, for which he requested the governor to send him an order quickly.

Upon the receipt of this despatch, Governor Don Francisco Tello ordered Don Juan Ronquillo to withdraw with his whole camp from Mindanao River. He was ordered first to make a great effort to chastise the enemy in Buhahayen, and then to burn the Spanish settlement and fort and go to La Caldera, fortify it, and leave there a sufficient garrison with artillery, boats, and provisions for its maintenance and service. Then he was to return to Manila with the rest of his men, after telling their friends in Tampacan that the Spaniards would shortly return to the river better equipped and in greater numbers.

Before this could be completed, however, the forces of Buhahayen, reinforced by a fleet and 1,000 soldiers from Terrenate, attacked the Spanish in their camp. In intense fighting, sometimes hand to hand, the Spanish routed the attackers, killing many, taking many prisoners, and capturing or burning most of the boats.

As soon as possible after this, the Spaniards attacked the settlements and forts of Buhahayen which such effect that the enemy, seeing themselves hard pressed and without anyone to help them, sent proposals of peace to Ronquillo. The outcome was their rendering recognition and homage to the Spanish, and pledging friendship with Tampacan, their ancient enemy. Thereupon the war was apparently ended, provisions were now to be had, and the Spaniards with little precaution crossed and went about the country wherever they wished. The people of Buhahayen promised to dismantle all their forts immediately, for that was one of the conditions of peace. When the Spaniards returned to their fort and settlement at Tampacan, Don Juan Ronquillo immediately sent despatches to Governor Don Francisco Tello, informing him of the different turn that the enterprise had taken.

The governor immediately sent a despatch countermanding his first order, but it arrived too late. The Spanish abandoned and burned their base on Mindanao River and left for Manila, leaving only a garrison of 100 soldiers at La Caldera.

The governor sent to arrest General Ronquillo on the road before he entered Manila, intending to proceed against him by law for having withdrawn the camp and army from Mindanao River without awaiting the orders he should have expected after the favorable turn of affairs. However, General Ronquillo was set at liberty on showing a private letter from the governor, which the latter had sent him separately with the first instructions, to the effect that he should return to Manila with his troops in any event, because they were needed in the islands for other purposes; and because of this letter Don Juan had determined not to await the second order.

This partial withdrawal of the Spanish resulted in their opposition gaining considerable strength. The king of Jolo Island, a vassal of the Spanish, soon revolted. The Spanish made an unsuccessful effort to reconquer Jolo in 1602.

=== The Revolt of Magalat ===
In 1596, a chief of Cagayan named Magalat and his brother instigated the people of Cagayan to rise against the colonial government because of the burden of the Spanish tribute. However, the uprising was quickly suppressed and Magalat and his men were exiled in Manila.

Some Dominican missionaries in Cagayan persuaded Governor Tello that Magalat should be pardoned, after knowing their condition for the revolt, and the latter fulfilled the favor. After Magalat was released, he went back to Cagayan and still continued to incite the people to fight, and many Spaniards and loyal natives were murdered by the rebels. In order to quell the revolt, Governor Tello sent Captain Pedro de Chavez. Magalat, however, appeared undefeated in open battle. Eventually, Magalat was assassinated in his own house by native men who were hired by the Spaniards.

=== Martyrdom of Franciscans in Japan ===
In 1596, the galleon San Felipe laden with Philippine goods sailed for New Spain, but because of severe weather it was forced to land in Japan, in territory controlled by Toyotomi Hideyoshi. The Japanese confiscated the merchandise and imprisoned the Spaniards.

Fray Pedro Baptista, superior of the Franciscan religious residing in Miako (Kyoto), attempted to mediate with the authorities, but without success. In fact he so angered Hideyoshi, that the latter ordered the suppression of Christianity. Twenty-six Christians were crucified on February 5, 1597 in Nagasaki. Besides Fray Pedro Baptista, they included Fray Martin de Aguirre, Fray Felipe de las Casas, Fray Gonçalo, Fray Francisco Blanco, Fray Francisco de San Miguel. In all there were 26 Franciscan and Jesuit priests and Japanese lay converts, including two boys. Their right ears were cut off, and they were paraded through the streets of Miako and through those of the cities of Fugimen, Usaca, and Sacai, to the great grief and sorrow of all Christians who saw their sufferings.

The Spaniards of the San Felipe eventually made it back to Manila, in various Japanese and Portuguese ships, but with a total loss of the merchandise they carried.

Governor Tello sent an ambassador to Hideyoshi bearing gifts (including an elephant) and also a protest at the treatment of the religious and the sailors, and a demand for the return of the goods the San Felipe had been carrying. Hideyoshi was delighted with the gifts and expressed a desired for friendship with the Spanish. However, he claimed he was unable to return the merchandise because it had already been distributed.

Francisco de Tello de Guzman left office in May 1602. He died in Manila in April of the following year.

Political offices
Preceded by Luis Pérez Dasmariñas	Governor and Captain-General of the Philippines; 1596–1602	Succeeded by Pedro Bravo de Acuña
