= Sangley Rebellion =

Sangley Rebellion may refer to:

- Sangley Rebellion (1603)
- Sangley Rebellion (1639)

== See also ==
- Sangley Massacre (1662)
- Sino-Spanish conflicts
