= 1582 Cagayan battles =

Combats of Spanish soldiers against Japanese pirates in the Philippines

Cagayan Battles
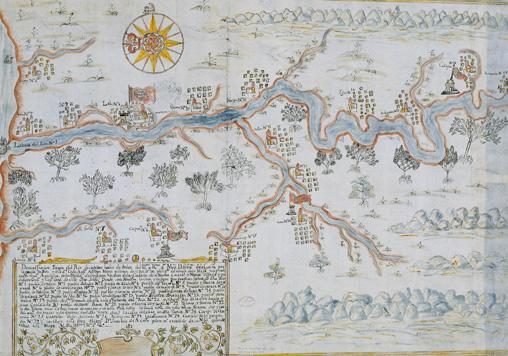
- Spanish map of the Cagayan river
Date	1582
Location	Aparri and Lal-lo, Cagayan, Philippines
Result	Spanish victory

Belligerents
(Spain) Spanish Empire: (Spain) Spanish Philippines	Wokou

Commanders and leaders
(Spain) Juan Pablo de Carrión (Spain) Pedro Lucas †	Tay Fusa

Strength
1 galley 14 brigantines 90 soldiers Several dozens of native allies	Sea: 1 junk 200-260 fighters Fort: 18 sampans 600-1000 fighters

Casualties and losses
20 dead	200-800 dead

The Cagayan battles (Combates de Cagayán in Spanish, カガヤンの戦い Kagayan no Tatakai in Japanese) occurred in 1582 between amphibious forces of the Spanish Philippines, led by Juan Pablo de Carrión, and Japanese wokou pirates, led by Tay Fusa, possibly identified with Naya Sukezaemon. The pirates had build a settlement near the Cagayan river, which the Spanish were ordered to assault. Although severely outnumbered, the Spanish defeated the wokou and forced them to abandon the island. Carrión later built the city of Nueva Segovia, now Lal-lo, in one of the placements of the battle.

The battles became a source of controversy in popular culture after they became known in the 21st century. They are usually described as a clash between Japanese samurai and Spanish tercio soldiers, two highly regarded fighting forces, despite in reality it featured neither samurai nor tercios. The battles largely pitted Asian pirates, of which only a part were Japanese ronin, against Spanish mestizo and Tlaxcaltec fighters hailing from New Spain, though indeed trained in tercio tactics, as well as Filipino fighters.

It was the second time the Spanish clashed against Japanese, the first being the 1574 Battle of Manila, where a large Sino-Japanese wokou army was defeated. As in the first, the Spanish prevailed thanks to superior weaponry and training.

== Background ==
By 1573, the commercial routes of the Manila galleon attracted piratic activity to the island of Luzón, the core of the Spanish Philippines. Japanese raiders had frequented the northern lands of the island before the Spanish conquest of the territory. The Spanish had already faced a large-scale wokou invasion in 1574, when the pirate Limahong besieged Manila in 1574 with a huge army containing both Chinese and Japanese before being repulsed from the city. Despite this, wokou sometimes alternated between trade and piracy depending on their needs. Japanese traders were welcomed in Manila, while Spanish merchants in turn commerced in Japan.

In 1581, the authorities in Manila were informed that Japanese pirates had built a settlement near Aparri, Cagayan, in the northern land of the island. They Japanese used this port, called Puerto de Japón by the Spaniards, to trade weapons for gold and raid the nearby natives. The following year, Spanish governor Gonzalo Ronquillo de Peñalosa ordered Captain Juan Pablo de Carrión to search and destroy it.

== Opposing forces ==
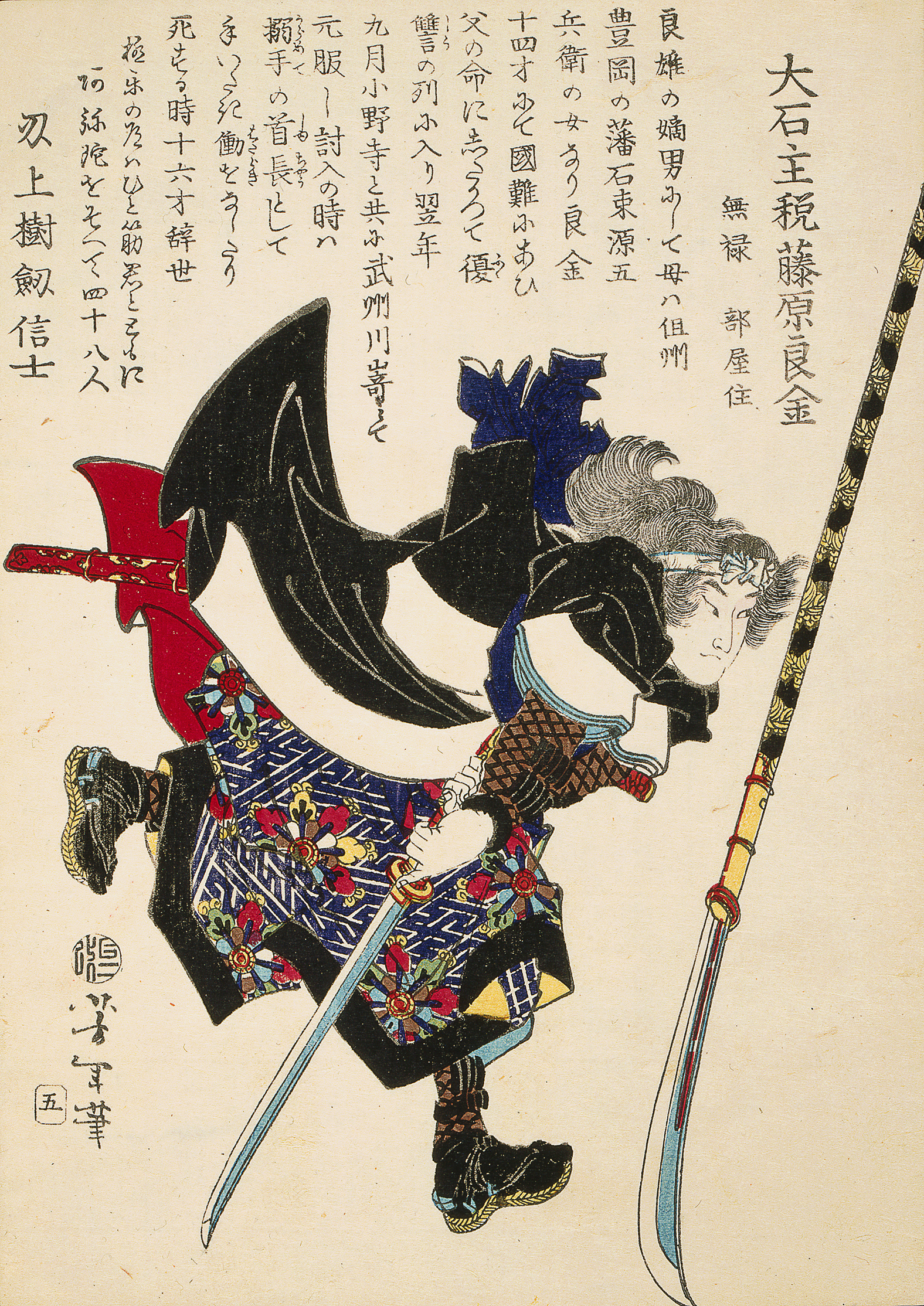
Rōnin, or masterless samurai.

The Wokou fleet based off Puerto de Japón was reportedly composed of 18 junks. According to Japanese sources, the port itself was defended by 600 fighters. Spanish sources increase it to 1,000. The Spanish were able to distinguish the Japanese from the Chinese and clearly identified those, although wokou were nonetheless composed by a motley mix of Asian ethnicities and even European outcasts. They were armed with western artillery, arquebuses and steel armor bought from the Portuguese, as well as probably Japanese-made Tanegashima guns. Spanish sources also describe them as wielding two-handed sabers like broadswords, probably nodachi or nagamaki.

They were led by "Tay Fusa", which does not correspond to a Japanese name but could be a transliteration of Taifu-san or Taifu-sama, with taifu (大夫) being a word for a Japanese medieval chieftain rank. Authors identified him with Naya Sukezaemon, who later became a Japanese merchant in Luzón.

The 70-year-old Carrión had a long career in battles against hostile natives. He gathered a fleet formed by the galley Capitana, the carrack San Yusepe and five frigates brought from Vigan. He embarked 40 soldiers, most of them Hispanic criollos, mestizos and Tlaxcaltec natives, with experience in the Chichimeca Wars and the very conquest of the Philippines. Only a handful of them would have fought in the wars of Europe. All of them, however, were well trained in the regular tactics of the tercios. He also took a number of native Filipino allies from Tagalo, Pampango and Visayan tribes, although he deemed them less reliable due to their loyalty being dubious.

== Battle ==
=== Naval battles ===
After capturing an unrelated Chinese corsair junk, the Hispanic flotilla passed the Cape Bojeador. They encountered a heavy wokou junk near the coast, whose crew had recently ravaged a native village. Carrión destroyed its main mast with his artillery and boarded the ship with the Capitana, but the junk turned out to contain 200 fighters armed with courasses and pikes, enough to repulse the boarding party and board their own galley. Other 60 Japanese arquebusiers stayed in the junk shooting at the Spanish.

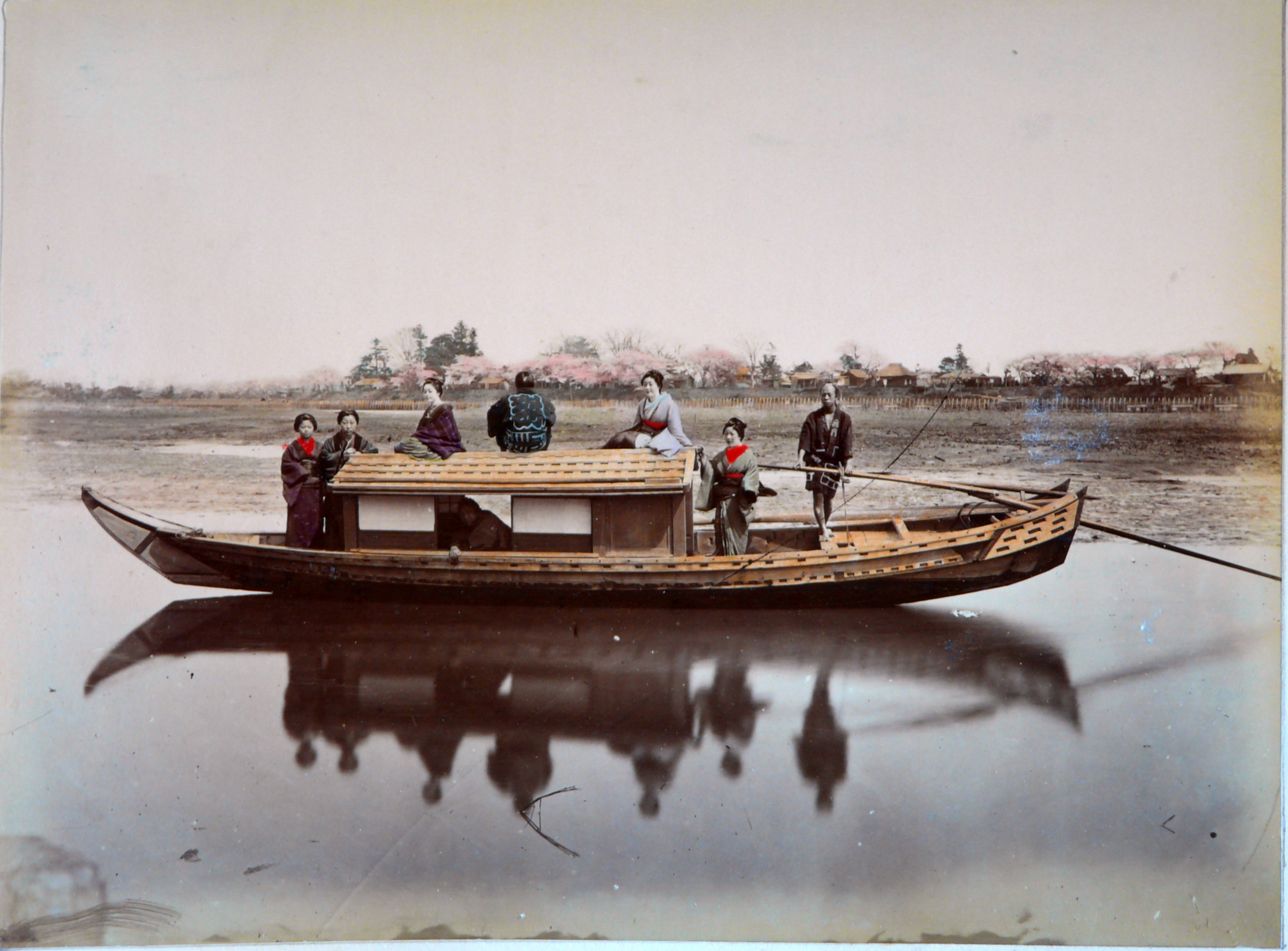
Japanese sampan-like river boat.

The galley's deck became a battlefield, but the Spanish improvised a parapet and managed to improbably rout the Japanese from the aftercastle, inflicting heavy casualties with their own arquebusiers and pikemen. Watching the rest of the Spanish fleet pirates returned to the junk and tried to escape, but the San Yusepe blocked their way and ravaged the junk with its broadside artillery. Several Japanese jumped overboard and tried to swam away, drowning due to the weight of their armor. At the end, only 18 Japanese remained alive to surrender. The Spanish had suffered their first casualties, among them the galley's captain Pedro Lucas, and the Capitana was damaged and taking water.

The flotilla continued up to the Cagayán River, which Carrión explored with the Capitana. Within the river, Carrión sighted eighteen skiff-sized sampans sacking a coastal village. The sampans attacked him, but he routed them, killing 200 pirates and supposedly a son of Tay Fusa. He then sighted Puerto de Japón, defended by 600-1,000 fighters and much artillery. The San Yusepe could not follow Carrión with the rest of the flotilla, as its captain, Luis Callejo, ordered to turn back upon a false alarm, after which the carrack hit a shallow and broke its anchors. Meanwhile, Carrión ordered to disembark, erect fortifications and arm them with the flotilla's artillery.

=== Land battle ===
The two forts engaged in diplomacy. Tay Fusa sent messengers to try to negotiate, stating that the Spanish "were robbers like himself, but that he was there first, and had come at his king's command". He proposed he would leave the island if Carrión paid him a large sum in gold to compensate the losses they would suffer, but the Spanish refused. According to Keiji Igawa, Carrión answered he was there to protect the natives and recover the gold Tay Fusa had sacked, and threatened to bring 600 men against him, warning the pirate that his own men would kill him if he did not accept. Intimidated, Tay Fusa would have ordered to withdraw from the island without a fight. Seiichi Iwao and the Spanish sources instead state that Tay Fusa ordered to attack and a battle took place.

The wokou tried to storm the fortifications with a force of some 600 strong. The Spanish beat them back thrice, capitalizing on the safety of their earthworks to fire volleys of arquebuses and artillery at the oncoming waves of men. Some of the Japanese reached the trenches, only to be contained by the Spanish pikemen. The Spanish knew the Japanese would try to seize the pikes even if wounded by them, so Carrión had ordered to grease the upper half of the shafts. The Japanese launched a new attack after a rest, suffering new casualties to the Spanish gunfire. A third assault from the flank was also broken by artillery.

By this point, the Spanish started running out of gunpowder due to the sheer number of enemies. Carrión was forced to order a defense by forming pike squares and placing rodeleros to attack from underneath. The Japanese attacked again and clashed against the greased pikes, but finding little space to comfortably use katanas and other two-handed weapons, they were decimated by the rodeleros. Finally, the pirate army routed, abandoning their position and withdrawing towards the sea, leaving behind their dead and wounded. Casualties in the Japanese side were 200, according to sources, or up to 800 in other Spanish sources. In comparison, Spanish casualties were said to be not higher than 20.

== Aftermath ==
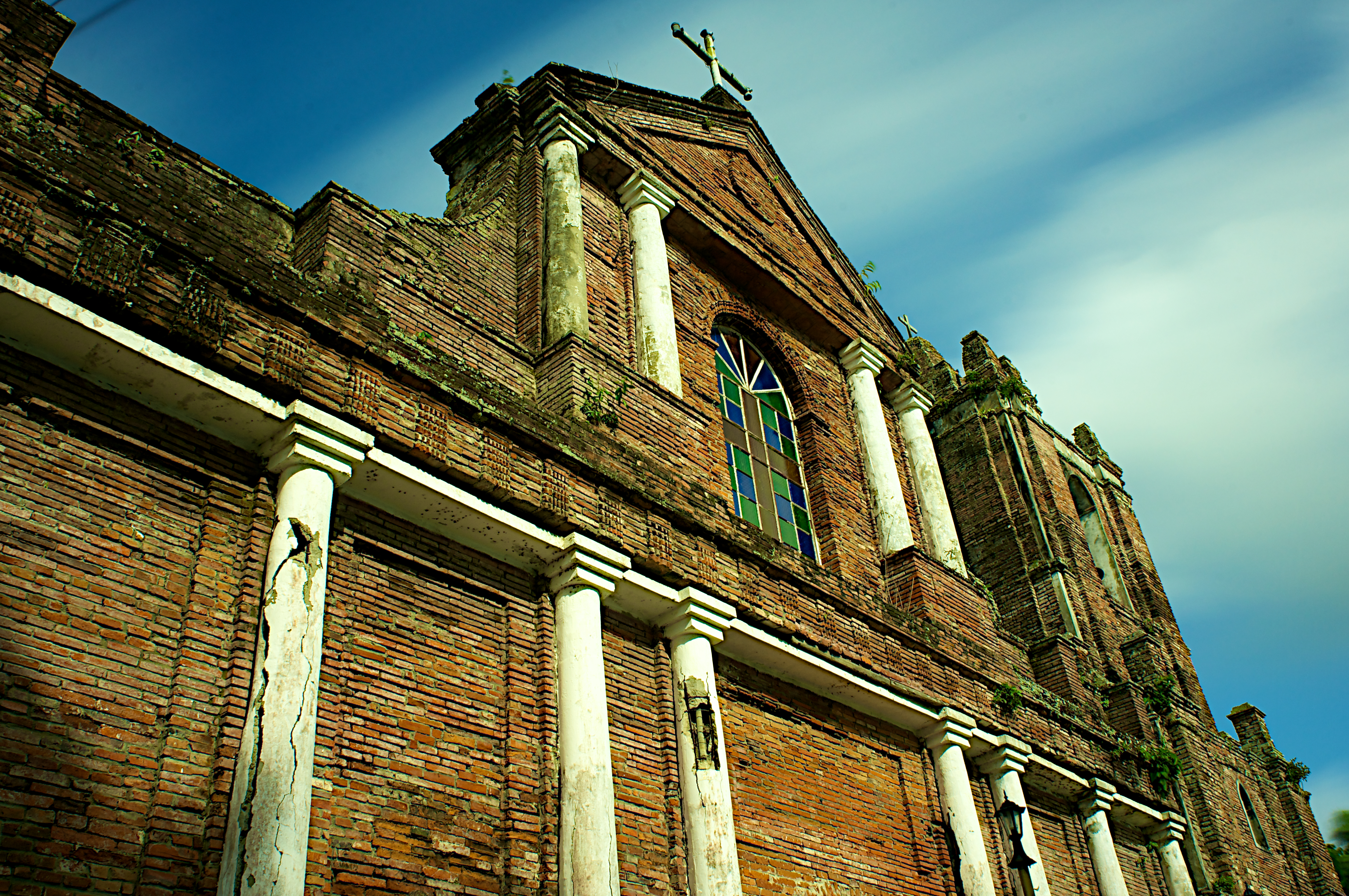
Nueva Segovia church.

With the region pacified and the arrival of reinforcements, Carrión founded the city of Nueva Segovia (now Lal-lo). With their defeat, wokou activity disappeared from Cagayan, leading most pirates to relocate in Lingayen. Piracy, and the impression left by the fierceness of the battle, continued being felt in Manila, leading the Spanish authorities to request more troops and for the city to be fortified in order not to disrupt commerce with China. For their part, commerce with the Japanese continued in the Philippines, remaining largely private enterprises before the establishment of the shuinsen system.

== See also ==
- Siege of Moji
- Battle of Fukuda Bay
- Battle of Manila (1574)
- Nossa Senhora da Graça incident

== Bibliography ==
- Borao, José Eugenio (2005). «La colonia de japoneses en Manila en el marco de las relaciones de Filipinas y Japón en los siglos XVI y XVII». Cuadernos Canela (Tokio: Confederación Académica Nipona, Española y Latinoaméricana) (17): 25-53. ISSN 1344-9109 (Spanish)
- Boxer, Charles Ralph (1951). The Christian Century in Japan: 1549-1650. University of California Press.
- Canales Torres, Carlos; Del Rey Vicente, Miguel (2021), Naves negras:la aventura del lago español, Editorial Edaf, ISBN 9788441441156
- Sola, Emilio (1999). Historia de un desencuentro: España y Japón, 1580-1614. Fugaz Ediciones. p. 24. ISBN 84-884-9409-2.
- Takekoshi, Yosaburo (2016). The Economic Aspects of the History of the Civilization of Japan. Taylor & Francis. ISBN 9781136523809.
- Tremml-Werner, Birgit (2025). Spain, China, and Japan in Manila, 1571-1644: Local Comparisons and Global Connections. Taylor & Francis. ISBN 9781040772218.
- Turnbull, Stephen (2021). The Lost Samurai: Japanese Mercenaries in South East Asia, 1593–1688. Frontline. ISBN 9781526758996.
- Zaide, Gregorio (1957). Philippine Political and Cultural History: The Philippines since pre-Spanish times. Philippine Education Company.
