= Sangley Massacre (1662) =

Massacre of Chinese people in the Philippines

The Sangley Massacre was a colonial ethnic cleansing in the Philippines in June 1662, when the Spanish governor of the Captaincy General of the Philippines ordered the killing of any Sangley (Chinese Filipinos) who had not submitted to the assembly area.

Anti-Chinese sentiment had been prevalent in the Spanish Philippines since the early 17th century, resulting in the First (1603), Second (1609) and the Third Sangley Rebellion (1639). In early 1662, the Southern Ming warlord Koxinga (Zheng Chenggong) defeated the Dutch colonial outpost in Taiwan at the Siege of Fort Zeelandia and established the Kingdom of Tungning with himself as the ruler. On April 24, 1662, weeks after becoming the ruler of the Kingdom of Tungning, Koxinga demanded that the Spanish authorities of Manila pay tribute, or else he would send a fleet to demand it. The message arrived on May 5. The Spanish authorities took the threat very seriously and withdrew their forces from the Moluccas and Mindanao to reinforce Manila (modern-day Intramuros) in preparation for an attack. The Chinese residents and native Filipino subjects were forced to gather food supplies and contribute labor to improving the city walls. Some argued for killing all non-Christian Chinese residents. Upon hearing rumor of that, Chinese residents began to flee even while the Spanish tried to reassure them and keep things quiet.

On May 24, a disturbance in the Chinese settlement resulted in casualties on both sides. The Spanish fired their cannons from the walls of Intramuros at the Chinese settlement (modern-day Binondo) while the Spanish governor ordered the Chinese residents to submit and all non-Christian Chinese residents to leave Manila. It is uncertain how many left, but 1,300 Chinese residents were mentioned to have departed on a single boat. On June 4, the Spanish ordered all Chinese residents who had not reported to an assembly area to be killed. Those who were not killed fled to the mountains, where they are believed to have died of starvation or killed by Negritos.

== See also ==
- Sino-Spanish conflicts

== Bibliography ==
- Willis, John E. (1998), Relations with the Maritime Europeans, 1514-1662
