= Battle of Manila (1574) =

Conflict between East Asian pirates and Spanish conquistadors in modern-day Parañaque

Coordinates: 14°35′N 120°58′E

Siege of Manila
- Part of the Spanish colonization of the Philippines and Sino-Spanish conflicts
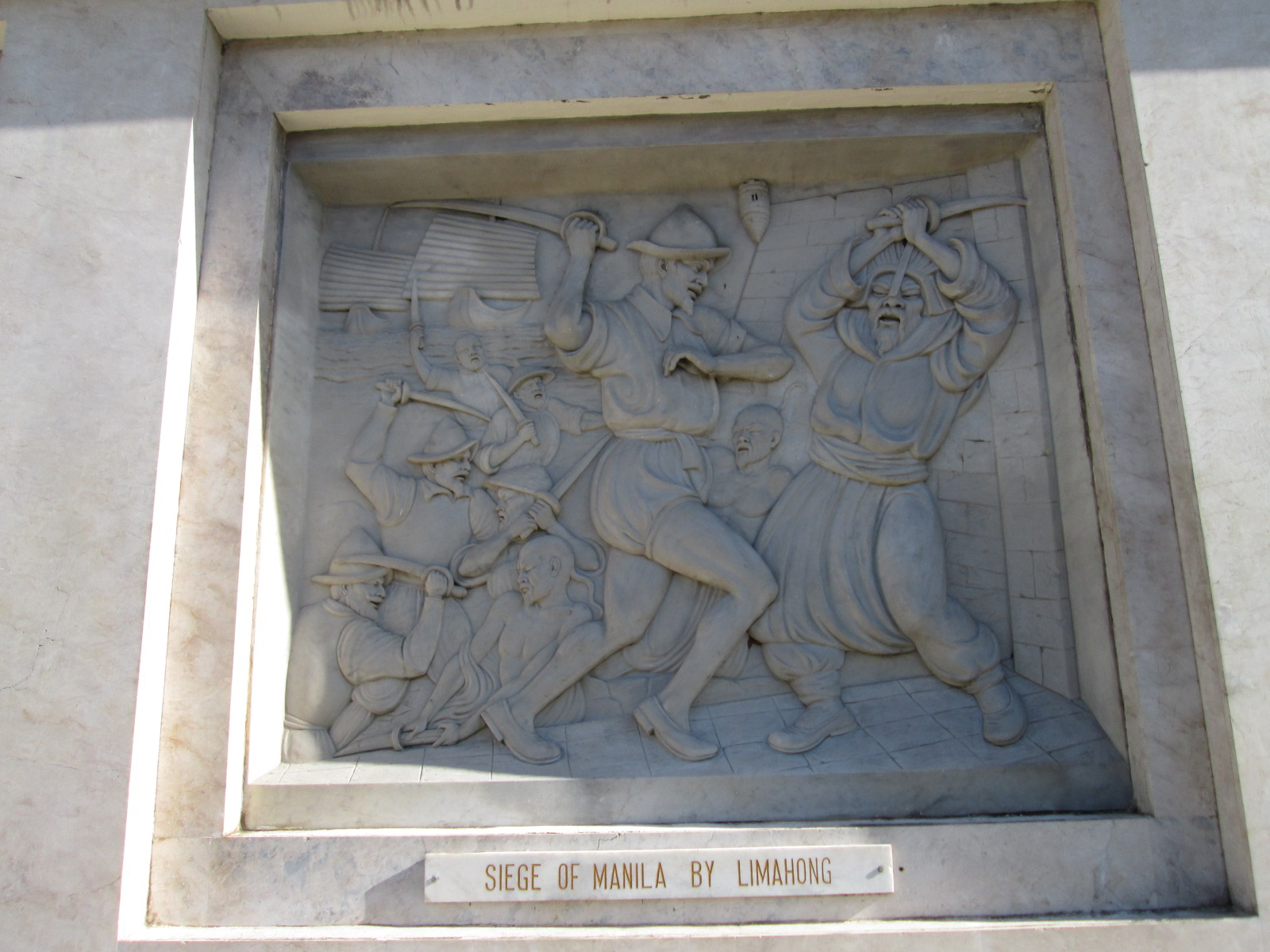
- Battle of Manila as depicted in the Quezon Memorial Shrine.
Date	November 29, 1574
Location	Manila, Parañaque
Result	Spanish victory

Belligerents
(Spain) Spanish Empire: New Spain; Spanish Philippines	Chinese pirates Wokou

Commanders and leaders
(Spain) Juan de Salcedo (Spain) Guido de Lavezaris (Spain) Martín de Goiti † (Spain) Gaspar Ramírez (Spain) Galo	Limahong; Shogo †

Strength
200 Spanish soldiers 300 Ilocano warriors Unknown number of militiamen	62 war junks 4,000 fighters and seamen

Casualties and losses
70 Spanish soldiers Unknown number of militiamen killed	400 killed

The Battle of Manila (1574) (Spanish: Batalla de Manila de 1574; Filipino: Labanan sa Maynila ng 1574) was fought on 29 November 1574 between Chinese and Japanese pirates led by Limahong and Spanish colonial forces with their native allies. It took place near Manila, mainly in what is now Parañaque, in the Philippines. It marked the first time the Spanish directly clashed with the Japanese, who had occasionally tried to colonize the Philippines and claim sovereignty over it.

Limahong's fleet landed at Parañaque and from there began to assault the fortifications of Intramuros. Initially, the inhabitants were disorganized and Limahong's forces gained the advantage. The Chinese also killed the Spanish maestre de campo, Martín de Goiti. This delayed their assault on Manila, since Goiti's house blocked their march. Limahong's forces laid siege to Manila but were halted by the fortifications and by defenders under Governor Guido de Lavezaris, who were later reinforced by fifty Spanish arquebusiers led by Juan de Salcedo.

After his defeat at Manila, Limahong abandoned his plans to take the city and instead settled in Pangasinan. The following year, a Spanish fleet led by Salcedo pursued Limahong, who escaped with part of his force. This led the Viceroy of Fukien to travel to the Philippines to secure Limahong's return to China, but the mission ultimately established diplomatic relations between China and the Spanish Philippines.

== Background ==
The first Spanish expedition arrived in the region in 1565, but the city was not founded until 1571. Once established, Manila became a center of commerce for multiple nations from South Asia as well as China and Japan, which traded porcelain, silk, and wood. Manila's fame as a prosperous city spread quickly around southern Asia, attracting the interest of pirates and marauders.

In 1574, Chinese warlord Limahong had just been expelled from China by the imperial fleet in a battle in Guangdong. He was looking to move his headquarters to the Philippine islands, where he could obtain greater gains with less difficulty. After capturing a Chinese trading ship that carried Spanish sailors, he learned that Manila had a garrison of only about 200 Spanish soldiers, and judged that it would be easy to capture the city in a surprise attack. In November, guided by Spanish prisoners, Limahong arrived in Luzón with a fleet to expel the Spaniards and take the city. He left only a small part of his force on the island of Batán, where he had taken refuge from the Chinese imperial fleet.

== Opposing forces ==
According to Spanish records, both sides were evenly matched in weapons and equipment. The key differences were the superior experience and training of the Spanish soldiers, their defensive positions, the timely arrival of reinforcements, and other tactical considerations. Both armies employed arquebuses and artillery pieces, as well as swords, daggers, and polearms. Protective equipment included steel armor, mail, and cloth gambesons.

=== Spanish ===
The garrison of Manila was composed of 200 Spanish soldiers. Half were Iberian, while the other half were of Mesoamerican origin, including both mestizos and indios amigos. The city was unprepared after a long period of peace, and the old fort built by Miguel López de Legazpi was badly maintained. While journeying to Manila, Salcedo recruited 200 Ilocano warriors.

=== Sino-Japanese ===
Limahong's fleet was composed of 60 to 72 junks, and comprised 2,000 soldiers, 2,000 sailors, and 1,500 colonists, including entire families, women captured for ransom in China and Japan, farmers, carpenters, artisans, doctors, and all the goods necessary to establish a settlement. A fleet of this size had probably been assembled from multiple ports around the sea, where its members lurked disguised as peaceful merchantmen while waiting for orders to rendezvous.

Although Limahong was Chinese, his pirate armada was a mix of Chinese and Japanese, along with other Asian ethnicities. According to historian Kenji Igawa, Chinese records show he acted in alliance with factions of wokou. Limahong's lieutenant was a Japanese man called Sioco in Spanish sources, a name that Yosaburō Takekoshi identified as a corruption of the Japanese name Shogo. Spanish sources also describe the invaders as wielding catanes, a corruption of the Japanese word katana, as well as more traditional Chinese weapons, scimitars, sabers, and daggers. It is also apparent that he had a Portuguese translator in his fleet.

Spanish chronicles describe in detail the arms and armor of Shogo's contingent, which historian Stephen Turnbull identifies as period Japanese military gear. The pirates are described as carrying battle standards fastened to their bearers' shoulders like sashimono, cutlasses and daggers tucked into their belts in a manner evoking the daishō, straight spears like the yari, and long-bladed polearms (described as "enough by themselves to undo the thickest hauberks"), probably referring to the naginata. The pirates also used many gunpowder hand grenades and incendiary devices, which Turnbull identifies as the Japanese grenade called horokubiya.

== Battle ==
Limahong's armada was spotted by Spanish posts at Villa Fernandina in northern Luzón, commanded by Juan de Salcedo and Francisco de Saavedra. Alarmed by the size of the fleet, Salcedo believed it was a Portuguese fleet coming to attack Manila, so he gathered fifty arquebusiers in seven oared vessels to reinforce the city. He also recruited 200 Ilocano warriors upon reaching Bauang. Meanwhile, he sent three messengers by sea to warn the city, but lack of wind allowed the pirate fleet to catch up with them, forcing the Spaniards to abandon the boats and continue on foot. As a result, the message could not be delivered in time.

On November 30, Limahong anchored at Isla del Corregidor and deployed Shogo on a night raid with 400 to 600 pirates to take the unsuspecting city by surprise. However, bad luck hit the pirate fleet as well. Limahong had ordered the execution of the Spanish prisoners after arriving at the beach; since the pirates could no longer rely on the prisoners' knowledge of the area, Shogo's expedition ran into dangerous currents, lost three boats, and drifted by mistake toward Parañaque instead of Manila. Shogo continued on foot toward Manila, towing the launches with ropes.

=== Attack on Goiti's house ===
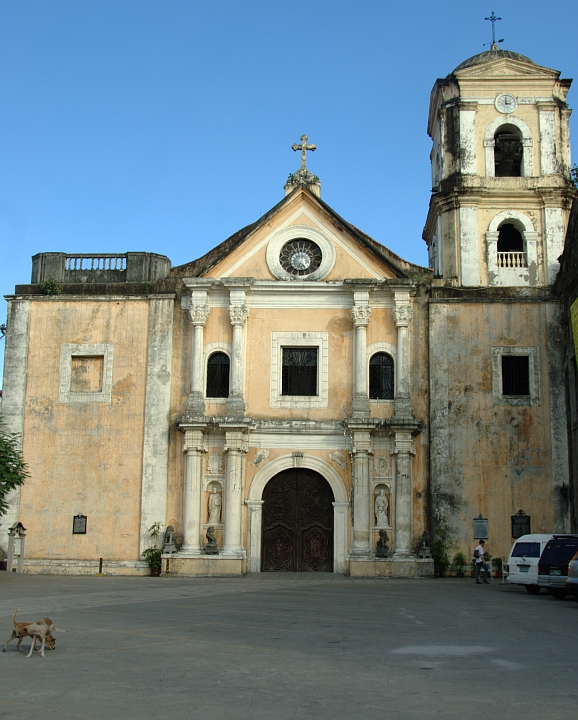
Modern San Agustín Church, built over the destroyed original.

The pirates were spotted after attacking several locals, who mistakenly believed that Shogo and his group were Muslim bandits from Borneo. Governor Martín de Goiti was informed at his house, near the old San Agustin Church, but dismissed the report. He sent only ten guards to find out what was happening, without informing the garrison. The pirates quickly killed the guards and besieged the house, where Goiti's wife, Lucía del Corral, taunted them from the window. Infuriated by the insults, which were translated for him by the Portuguese, Shogo ordered the house to be set on fire after confirming that it was well fortified.

Finally understanding the dire situation, Goiti and the few men inside sallied out against the pirates in a desperate attack. The governor was elderly and convalescing from an illness at the time, but he jumped from a low window in his rush to engage the enemy. They were all killed, and the pirates cut off their noses and ears as human war trophies, since Limahong had put up a bounty for every dead Spaniard. Del Corral was stripped and left for dead with a wound in the throat, while another woman in the house died before she could surrender herself. The house was destroyed, the only survivors being Del Corral and the soldier and pilot Francisco de Astigarribia.

=== Attack on Manila ===
Battle of Manila. Reseña histórica, Caro y Mora, 1898.

With Goiti dead, Shogo resumed his march towards Manila, dividing his force into three columns. However, although the governor's house was located some distance away, Lavezaris was warned by the blaze and gunshots, allowing him to raise the alarm in time for Manila to prepare. Shogo's force was met outside the walls by a nearby team of twenty arquebusiers commanded by Lorenzo Chacón, who harassed them into halting. However, their numerical advantage allowed the pirates to encircle Chacón and press their attack, killing eight before the rest could cut their way toward the city. The Chinese pirates pursued them, but another company of 20 Spanish soldiers under Alonso Velázquez attacked from the flank. Shogo, likely fearing the intervention of more Spanish reinforcements, called for a retreat to Cavite, where they had agreed to reunite with Limahong after the victory.

Shogo concealed his failure before re-embarking, ordering his wounded to remain ashore and telling Limahong that he had aborted the attack because of the long march caused by their detour. He promised to take the city in a second attack, but Limahong advised waiting two days to let the men rest. For his part, Lavezaris, correctly predicting a second assault, ordered improvised fortifications to be built, gathered all his artillery, and summoned all nearby soldiers to Manila, eventually counting 150 of them. Many in Manila still believed the pirates worked for the Raja of Borneo, so Lavezaris arrested two local Muslim chieftains, Numanatay and Rajabago, suspecting they might be enemy insiders. The truth is unknown, although the two were later found to have been strangled in their cells.

While approaching Manila by night, Salcedo realized the city had been attacked. He used his soldiers, warriors, and servants to stage a deception, marching in loose formation with many lights and playing loud marching music in the dark, to make any observer believe a great relief army was approaching. He reached the city safely, where Lavezaris promoted him to the maestre de campo post vacated by Goiti and gave Salcedo's former command to Gaspar Ramírez, Velázquez's ensign. Lavezaris then ordered all weapons to be distributed among the citizens and the city to be further fortified.

=== Arrival of the pirate fleet ===
On the night of December 2, Limahong's fleet was spotted arriving in Manila. The first artillery exchanges happened at daybreak when the fleet anchored and deployed 1,500 pirates again commanded by Shogo, who had sworn on his life to take the city. Their launches were sent back to the ships so that the pirates would have no means of retreat and would be motivated to fight.

After setting fire to many coastal houses with incendiary grenades, including the San Agustín Church, Shogo ordered his troops to divide into three contingents, advancing from the seaside, the city's main street, and the Pasig River, hoping to draw the Spaniards outside, where they could envelop them from three sides. However, Lavezaris anticipated his strategy and ordered his soldiers not to leave the walls, even when the Chinese fleet moved to find better shooting positions, since the Spanish defensive positions gave them greater safety to return fire and inflict damage. The first and second columns converged in front of the city's plaza, still uncontested, but at that point the Spanish opened fire with their artillery and arquebuses. Surprised by the heavy fire, Shogo was forced to act, and he gave the order to assault the walls, hurling more firebombs and leaving his third company in the rearguard.

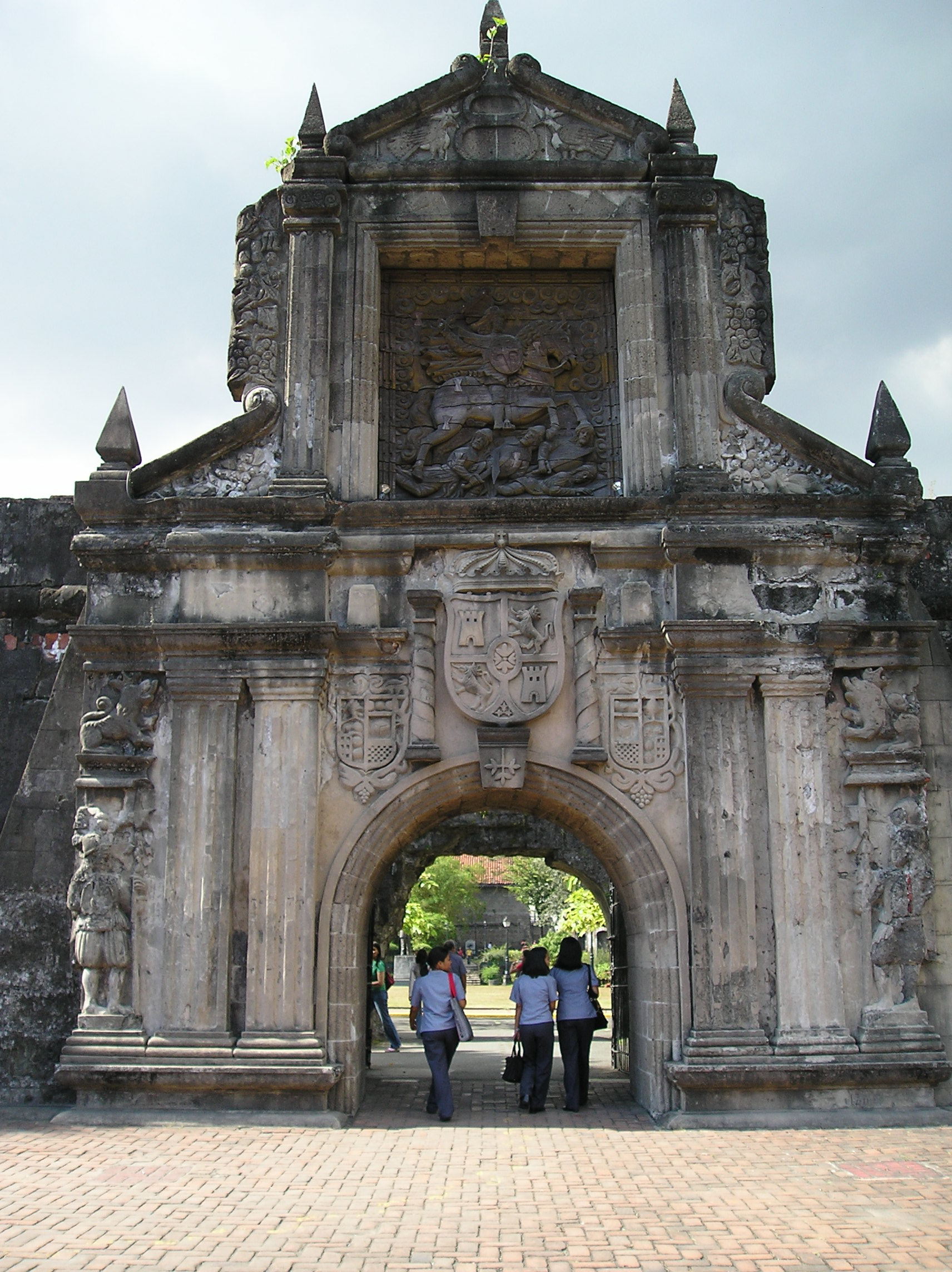
Late Fort Santiago in Manila.

The citizens initially repulsed all attacks, but one of the Spanish commanders of the alabarderos, Ensign Sancho Ortiz, was overwhelmed and shot down, leaving his bulwark open to the Chinese pirates. The pirates entered the fortifications and engaged the forces of Salcedo and Francisco de León, Manila's mayor. At the same time, Spanish artillery overpowered the Chinese fleet and pushed it out of the harbor. The main battle moved to the streets, where pirates killed León, but Lavezaris came to their aid at the head of a squad of pikemen. Eventually, with the force of their assault broken by the local resistance, the pirates were expelled from the walls and routed.

While the battle raged, unrest broke out behind the Spanish lines. Assuming the Spaniards would be defeated, groups of natives took advantage of the battle to sack empty houses, and a large group of slaves broke out intending to escape. They stole launches and tried to flee through the Pasig, but they did so with such haste that several boats were overturned and many slaves drowned; they were also attacked by native slaves, who saw a chance to take revenge for previous servitude and enmities. There were also riots in Tondo and Mindoro, where the locals, including chieftain Lakandula, sacked Christian churches and took members of the clergy hostage to offer to Limahong as tribute in case of his victory.

Salcedo drove the pirates to the beach and inflicted many casualties, including Shogo, who was taken down by a Spanish marksman. The pirate captains attempted to rally their men, but to no avail. They were forced to return to the walls when Limahong returned with several ships to deploy reinforcements of 400 soldiers, but these were defeated as well. Limahong then called back one of the three companies left by Shogo, gathering around 1,000 men, but judging it useless to try any more assaults, he finally called off the attack. His men were sent to sack the nearby places while Limahong set two stranded ships on fire, hoping to divert Salcedo's attention, but the Spanish saw through the ruse and attacked the looters. Ultimately, Limahong summoned all his soldiers to his ships and abandoned the shore altogether under fire from Manila. There was still a last alarm when many torches were spotted at the beach by night, making the Spanish fear a third attack, but they turned out to be locals from Luzón looting the pirates' corpses.

== Chase to Pangasinan ==
Limahong headed to Parañaque, which he pillaged in revenge for the defeat, while Lavezaris rebuilt Manila and called in forces from Panay, Camarines, and Cebu, preparing for another attack. Afterward, the city learned that Limahong's fleet had retreated northward. One of the local militiamen, Galo, was rewarded with the Spanish title of don for his bravery and leadership. While Lavezaris gathered a fleet to chase Limahong, Salcedo was sent to put down the riots in Tondo and Mindoro. He convinced chieftain Lakandula to surrender and release the hostages, who had been tortured by fire.

The remnants of Limahong's fleet were later discovered on an island in the Agno River in Pangasinan, where Francisco de Saavedra had traveled to warn the Ilocanos against the pirates. Limahong had established his settlement there, spreading propaganda about a supposed victory over the Spaniards and falsely promising rule without tribute, hoping to incite a revolt against the Spanish. Saavedra was betrayed by the natives, who sold him to Limahong, but he realized what was happening in time and managed to escape and return to Manila with the news. Three months later, in March 1575, Lavezaris launched the anticipated expedition to punish Limahong before he could make local alliances. He assembled 60 ships crewed by 250 soldiers, 400 sailors, and 1,500 to 1,700 indigenous warriors, including some locals dissatisfied with the warlord. Lakandula also lent his support.

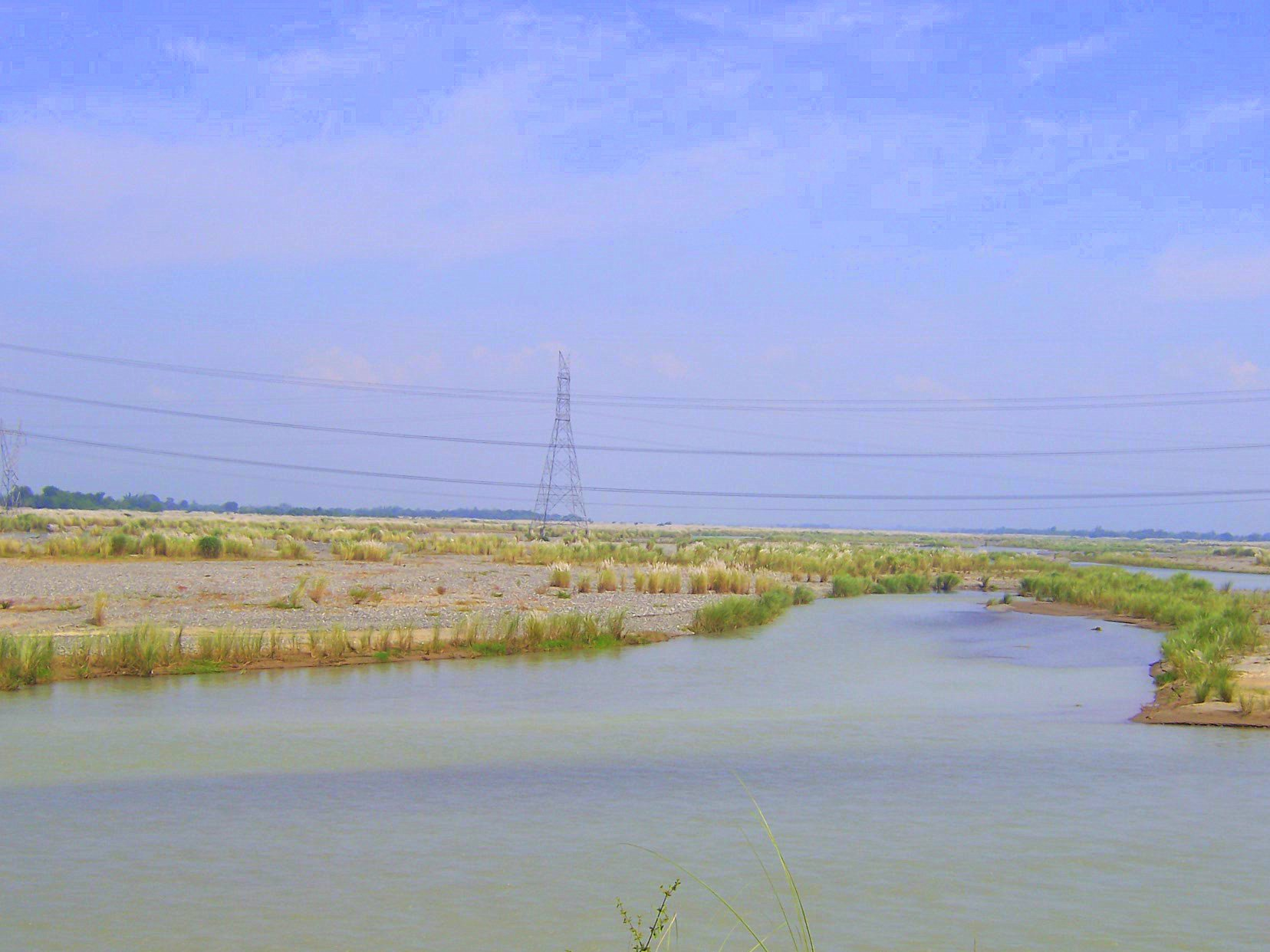
Agno River.

Learning that Limahong had around 2,000 fighters, Salcedo blocked the river with chained ships and fortified the shores. After the first contact, he sent his captains Lorenzo Chacón, Pedro de Chaves, and Gabriel de Rivera, along with many warriors, to disable the anchored Chinese ships, capturing some and burning the rest to leave the Chinese pirates with no way to escape. Their group found a way into the settlement and battled Limahong's forces at its outer wall, but were prevented from advancing further only because they became distracted, plundering riches and capturing women they found. Nonetheless, they closed in, mounting a tight siege on the compound. Salcedo sent a translator with a letter asking for his surrender; Limahong claimed he would accept if the Spanish retreated first, so no agreement was reached.

The siege went on for four months, hoping to force Limahong's surrender by starvation. Chinese commander Pesung Aumon arrived unexpectedly to help with negotiations, offering Limahong the choice of becoming a privateer for the Wanli Emperor or being annihilated by the Chinese fleet. Still, Limahong refused, as he had a plan to escape. After sacrificing his wounded men and abandoning others, the warlord broke out cleverly from the siege, building 37 improvised boats and moving them through a channel he had secretly excavated, and disappeared into the sea. A last contact occurred at Cape Bojeador in Luzon, where Limahong was surprised by a storm before escaping.

== Aftermath ==
The end of the conflict marked the first political communication between Spain and China. While they besieged Limahong, Aumon asked Lavezaris for permission to pay for the Chinese captives, since among them were kidnapped noblewomen. The Spanish governor instead gave them up for free, asking only that a Spanish embassy be sent to the emperor as a condition. The expedition was directed by churchmen Martín de Rada and Jerónimo Martín and assisted by Chinese merchant Sinsay, a long-time friend of the Spaniards, and carried orders to respect local religions and establish commercial relations, since Lavezaris was aware of the great benefits of the Chinese trade and desired to expand it.

The Chinese welcomed them in Fujian and even accepted their proposal to build Spanish settlements similar to the Portuguese Macau, and the Spanish were shown Xiamen Bay. After it became known that Limahong had escaped, however, the negotiations stalled, especially when Lavezaris was replaced in his post by the far less capable governor Francisco de Sande in the midst of them. Sande offended Chinese ambassadors in Manila by not giving them gifts, fearing they would be mistaken for tribute in the Chinese court, and later accused the ambassadors of trying to coax him into falsely claiming to the Wanli Emperor that Limahong had been killed. The Spanish established a trading post in China only briefly, in 1598, at El Piñal. As a consequence of this diplomatic failure, the idea of the Empresa de China began to be entertained in Manila.

Despite the pirate's escape, Salcedo was hailed as a hero for ending the threat with so few men, receiving the nickname the "Hernán Cortés of the Philippines". However, he died of illness a year later at only 27. For his part, Limahong was later defeated in Palau by a Chinese navy of 200 ships, commanded by Viceroy Wang Wanggao of Fujian, and escaped in a single ship, offering his services in Siam and India before disappearing from the historical record.

== In popular culture ==
The battle entered Filipino popular culture, becoming the subject of books, comics, and plays. It is mentioned in Walter Robb's essay "Walls of Manila".

== Bibliography ==
- Borja, Marciano (2012). Basques in the Philippines. University of Nevada Press. ISBN 9780874178913.
- Boxer, Charles Ralph (2017). South China in the Sixteenth Century (1550-1575). Taylor & Francis. ISBN 9781317052241.
- Stearn, Duncan, Chronology of South-East Asian History 1400-1996 (Dee Why, NSW: The Mitraphab Centre Pty Ltd., 1997).
- Takekoshi, Yosaburo (2016). The Economic Aspects of the History of the Civilization of Japan. Taylor & Francis. ISBN 9781136523809.
- Tremml-Werner, Birgit (2025). Spain, China, and Japan in Manila, 1571-1644: Local Comparisons and Global Connections. Taylor & Francis. ISBN 9781040772218.
- Turnbull, Stephen (2021). The Lost Samurai: Japanese Mercenaries in South East Asia, 1593–1688. Frontline. ISBN 9781526758996.
- "La Relación del suceso de la venida del tirano chino del gobernador Guido de Lavezares (1575): Épica española en Asia en el siglo XVI:" Edición, transcripción y notas (incluye facsimil del manuscrito original), Juan Francisco Maura. Lemir (Departamento de Filología Hispánica de la Universidad de Valencia), 2004.
