= Guido de Lavezaris =

Spanish colonial administrator and official

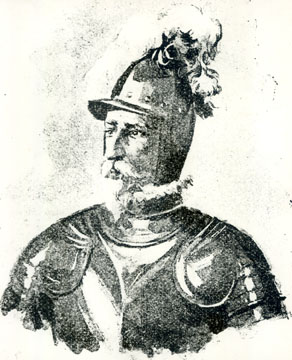

2nd Governor-General of the Philippines
- In office August 20, 1572 – August 25, 1575
- Monarch: Philip II of Spain
- Governor: (Viceroy of New Spain); Martín Enríquez de Almanza
- Preceded by: Miguel López de Legazpi
- Succeeded by: Francisco de Sande

Personal details
- Born: c. 1512; Seville, Spain
- Died: c. 1581 (aged 68–69); Manila, Philippines
- Occupation: colonial administrator and official

Guido de Lavezaris (c. 1512 – d. 1581) was the second Spanish Governor General of the Philippines. He succeeded Miguel López de Legazpi in 1572 as governor, and was succeeded by Francisco de Sande on August 25, 1575.

== Early life ==
Little was known of Governor-General Lavezares. In 1543, he became a member of the Villalobos Expedition that traveled to the Philippines. He became the royal treasurer of the expedition during the navigation. Later on, he was one of several prisoners who escaped from a prison in Ambon Island when Villalobos' crew and ships were captured by the patrolling Portuguese.

== Governorship ==
During his governorship, he directed Legazpi's grandson Juan de Salcedo to go to the northern portion of Luzon together with some 100 Spanish soldiers and conquer the present-day Ilocos and establish Villa Fernandina. Lavezaris also conquered the peninsula of Camarines and granted vast encomiendas to his loyal generals.

In 1574, he defeated the notorious Chinese pirate Limahong when the latter attempted to colonize the Philippines. In 1575, Spanish friar Martín de Rada filed a complaint to King Philip II of Spain against Lavezaris, which led to his removal from office. He was reported for abusing power and imposing higher tributes to the natives.

== Post-governorship ==
He never returned to Spain but retired as a wealthy encomendero. His successor Francisco de Sande issued a decree in 1576 stating the division of his encomienda into smaller lands which were to be distributed to the natives. Sande also filed legal cases like usurpation to him, but this was later absolved by Philip II. The municipality of Lavezares, Northern Samar was named after him.

== Bibliography ==
Maura, Juan Francisco. La Relación del suceso de la venida del tirano chino del gobernador Guido de Lavezares (1575): Épica española en Asia en el siglo XVI. Edición, transcripción y notas (incluye facsimil del manuscrito original), Juan Francisco Maura. Lemir (Departamento de Filología Hispánica de la Universidad de Valencia) 2004.

Political offices
Preceded by Miguel López de Legazpi	Governor and Captain-General of the Philippines; 1572–1575	Succeeded by Francisco de Sande
