= Kandarapa =

Filipino Princess

- Dayang-Dayang

Princess of Tondo
- Reign: 16th century
- Born: Kandarapa c. 1553; Tondo
- Spouse: Juan de Salcedo
- Royal house, vassal to the Sultanate of Brunei: Lakandula (Lacándola)
- Royal house, vassal to the Sultanate of Brunei: Kingdom of Tondo
- Mother: Salanta
- Religion: Roman Catholic (formerly Hindu)

Kandarapa was a native Filipina, princess of the Tondo polity in the island of Luzon during the 16th century Spanish conquest of the Philippines, and the wife of the Spanish conquistador Juan de Salcedo. She also known by the Christian name of Dolores de Lacándola.

== Biography ==
=== Origin ===
She was described as a beautiful young woman who came from a tribal royal family. Kandarapa was the niece of Rajah Lakandula of Tondo, and the daughter of his sister, Princess Salanta, who was widowed at a young age. She was named after the Philippine nightjar, a type lark that frequents rice paddies and the birdsong of which was the comparison to her beautiful voice. Her uncle, the king, resisted conversion to Islam and remained loyal to the native religion (Hindu-Animist) of his forebears, and although Tondo was an older dominion, it had ceded power to Maynila, which was established south across the Pasig River estuary as a satellite state of the Sultanate of Brunei making inroads into Luzon. Islam had been brought two centuries earlier to the Philippine archipelago, primarily in the south, by preachers travelling with traders from the islands of Borneo and Indonesia. During this period, Islam had slowly began converting the native tribes of Luzon. Lakandula, desirous of forging an alliance with the much more powerful Rajah of Macabebe, Tariq Sulayman, betrothed Kandarapa to him. She disapproved the match as he practised polygamy in line with Islamic tradition.

Afterwards, the balance of power between the state of Manila and the Tondo came to a change with the arrival of the Spaniards who had sailed from Mexico. They were firmly against Muslim interests as Christian Spain had just finished the Reconquista, retaking the Emirate of Granada as the last holdout of Arabs since the 8th century.

Kandarapa was bathing in the Pasig River with a retinue of servants when the Mexican-born Salcedo chanced upon her. While her entourage fled in fear, she froze and stared at the Spaniard, who also stood while "appreciating' her appearance. After briefly beholding the princess, he politely excused himself to do an errand.

=== Marriage to Salcedo ===
Kandarapa later married Juan de Salcedo in 1572, at the age of 19. According to Philippine historical documents and a written account by Don Felipe Cepeda, Salcedo's aide, who returned to Acapulco, recount that after the Spanish conquest of Luzon with Mexican and Visayan assistance, and their consequent takeover of the Pasig River delta polity of Hindu Tondo, which was the previous preeminent state in Luzon before the Brunei Sultanate established their puppet-kingdom of Islamic Manila, Salcedo was about 22 years old when he fell in love with the 18-year-old "Dayang-dayang" (a native Filipino title analogous to "Princess") Kandarapa, so named after the lark of the rice fields, whose birdsong she imitated by her beautiful singing voice, was said to be the niece of Rajah Lakandula, Tondo's Lakan ("Paramount ruler"). Juan fell in love, upon seeing the femininity of her figure while she and her handmaidens were bathing in the Pasig River. Their love was completely against their forebears' wishes since Lakandula wanted his niece, Dayang-dayang Kandarapa, to be married to the Rajah of Macabebe which Kandarapa didn't want as he was already married multiple times to other women due to his Islamic custom; and Miguel López de Legazpi wanted his Mexican born grandson, Salcedo, to marry a pure white European Spanish woman. The Rajah of Macabebe learnt of the budding romance from Rajah Sulayman of Maynila, a fellow Muslim Rajah, and in his rage cried out:

"May the sun divide my body in two, the crocodiles eat it, and my wives become unfaithful, if I ever become the friend of the Spaniards!"

— (طارق بن زياد ) Tariq Sulayman, Rajah of Macabebe

The chieftain Rajah Tariq Sulayman then waged the Battle of Bangkusay against the Spaniards, to counter-act which, the Spanish general Miguel López de Legazpi dispatched Martin de Goiti and Juan de Salcedo to the battlefield where they slayed Sulayman by cannonshot to the chest, thereby he fell overboard to be eaten by the crocodiles he swore by. The Spanish were afterward overloaded with loot and prisoners, including Lakandula's son and nephew, whom López de Legazpi freed while concealing his knowledge of the rajahs of Tondo's betrayal. De Goiti sailed into Bulakan through the twisting channels of the Río Grande de Pampanga, bringing Lakandula and Sulayman with them to urge locals into submission. López de Legazpi imprisoned Lakandula after he returned to Tondo without authorization despite his eloquence in persuading the other datus (chieftains) to join the Spaniards. When de Goiti and Salcedo returned, of course, Salcedo petitioned for Lakandula's freedom, and he was released.

Afterwards, Juan and Kandarapa secretly married, exchanged letters and rings, and hoping that the future will offer them happiness. Fray Alvarado quickly catechized and baptized Kandarapa, along with many other members of Lakandula's family, into the Catholic Church, giving her the Christian name Dolores. Her Spanish name was thus rendered as "Dolores de Lacándola". Kandarapa sent Salcedo a message within a cluster of white lotuses, sacred in Tantric beliefs for remaining pure and beautiful despite growing from the mud, and an emblem of Vishnu.

=== Death ===
However, Kandarapa mistakenly thought Salcedo had been unfaithful to her, as the disapproving López de Legazpi sent his grandson on far-flung expeditions. He even lied his grandson had married the daughter of the Rajah of Kaog, Santa Lucia. She died of a broken heart, and upon returning from his campaigns, Salcedo learnt of this and kept her token of fidelity until the end. It is said that when he died in Ilocos, he had in his breast pocket the dried leaves of the lotuses Kandarapa had sent him. This romance, as recorded by Don Felipe Cepeda in Mexico, was picked up by the Catalan Jesuit, Rev. Fr. José Ibáñez, who published this romance in Spain.

== See also ==
- History of the Philippines
