= Juan de Salcedo =

Spanish conquistador (1549–1576)

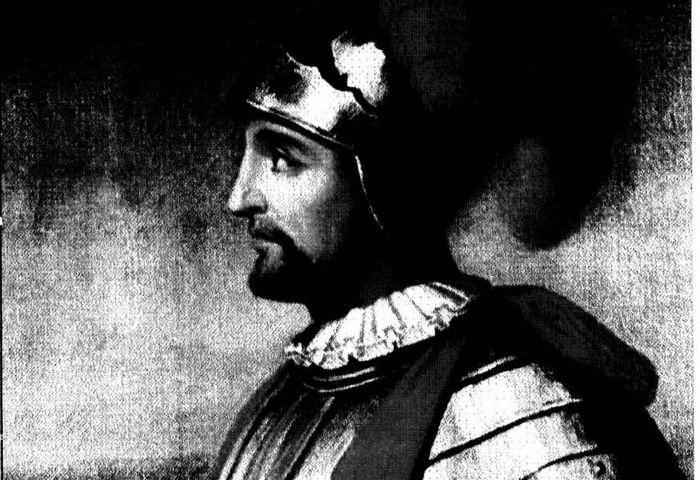
- Juan de Salcedo, 16th century Spanish conquistador in the Philippines.
- Born: c.1549 Mexico City, Viceroyalty of New Spain
- Died: 11 March 1576 (aged 26–27); Vigan, Captaincy General of the Philippines
- Spouse: Princess Kandarapa
- Military career
- Allegiance: Spain
- Branch: Spanish Army
- Service years: 1564–1576
- Rank: Lieutenant; Soldier (Infantry / Cavalry)
- Conflicts: Central Philippines: * Battle of Cebu (1565); Northern Philippines: * Battle of Manila (1570) * Battle of Tondo (1570-1571) * Battle of Bangkusay (1571) * Siege of Fort Santiago (1574) * Battle of Manila (1574) * Siege of Pangasinan (1575)
- Awards: Granted control of the Ilocos region and the City of Vigan, by King Philip II of Spain

Juan de Salcedo (Spanish pronunciation: [ˈxwan de salˈθeðo]; 1549 – 11 March 1576) was a Novohispano conquistador. He was the nephew of Spanish general Miguel López de Legazpi, though some records say grandson. Salcedo was one of the soldiers who accompanied the Spanish conquest to the Philippines in 1565. Renowned by his feats and strategic skills, American historian William Scott called Salcedo, "the last of the Conquistadores."

== Biography ==
He joined the Spanish military in 1564 at age 15, on their voyage of exploration to the East Indies and the Pacific, in search of rich resources such as gold and spice, and to find a passage to the islands were the previous Spanish expeditions led by Ferdinand Magellan had landed in 1521, and Ruy López de Villalobos in 1543.

=== Conquest of the Philippines ===
In 1567, at age 18, Salcedo the youngest soldier in the Spanish infantry, led an army of about 300 Spanish and Mexican soldiers (Filipino and Spanish historian, Carlos Quirino estimated that over half of the expedition members where Mexicans of various mixed ethnicities, mainly Criollo, Mestizo and Indio, with the remaining being Spaniards from Spain) and 600 Visayan allies along with Martín de Goiti for their conquest of Manila (then under the Islamic occupation by the Sultanate of Brunei).

There they fought a number of battles against the natives and their leaders, mainly against the chieftain Rajah Tarik Sulayman (a name derived from Arabic طارق بن زياد "Tāriq"), Islamic settlements in Philippines were abundant before and during the Mexican-Spanish conquest. The Spanish soldiers coalesced in 1570 and 1571, to attack the native tribes and the Islamic settlements in the island of Luzon, in order to take control of their lands.

=== Expedition to Luzón ===
In May 1572, Salcedo led an exploration expedition of 45 Spaniards and a mass of Filipino auxiliaries. They journeyed northward and founded several Spanish settlements, including the Ilocos. They also defeated a flotilla of three Japanese pirates in the process, and occupied the village of Vigan when their chief resisted their pass, although Salcedo ordered to respect the women and children.

Leaving 30 of his men at Vigan, Salcedo proceeded to sail around the northern Luzon coast, and down the eastern shore, with 15 men in 2 open boats. Being advised the currents would compromise him, he returned and explored Cagayan. There he was challenged by an Ilabay warrior to a duel which turned out to be an ambush, but Salcedo alone faced and defeated many of the ambushers, which apparently numbered up to 300, until he could be rescued. He later made peace with their people. He returned to Manila 3 months later with 50 pounds of gold, and was granted with estates called haciendas, along with the city of Vigan, for the lands he had conquered by King Philip II of Spain.

=== Siege of Manila ===
In 1574, Salcedo hurried back to Manila, when that city was threatened by a large pirate invasion led by Limahong who had sailed from the South China Sea. Salcedo gathered 600 infantry soldiers consisting of 300 Spaniards and Mexicans, plus their allies of 300 native Filipinos to defend the settlements and drive out the 6,500 Chinese sea pirates who had laid siege on the area. Afterwards intense fighting had occurred, and a number of his soldiers had died during the altercation. The Spaniards were able to repel the pirates. Following the Spanish success in the Battle of Manila in 1574, Salcedo pursued Limahong to Pangasinan in 1575. There the Spaniards besieged the pirates for four months, before Limahong surrendered and made good of his escape.

=== Later life ===
After the war, he returned to the Ilocos to govern the settlements. There he would spend his final years.

Salcedo died suddenly in March 1576, after a short illness, probably of dysentery or malaria, at the age of 27.

== Personal life ==
Salcedo was born in 1549 in the Kingdom of Mexico in the viceroyalty of New Spain. He was the son of Pedro de Salcedo and Teresa López de Legazpi. He had one older brother named Felipe de Salcedo, who was also a soldier in the Spanish army, and who accompanied him and his grandfather during their campaigns to the Philippines. Their mother was the daughter of Miguel López de Legazpi and Isabel Garcés.

Salcedo was married to Princess Kandarapa, the native Princess of Tondo in 1572, at the age of 23. According to Philippine historical documents and a written account by Don Felipe Cepeda, Salcedo's aide, who returned to Acapulco, recount that after the Spanish conquest of Luzon with Mexican and Visayan assistance, and their consequent takeover of the Pasig River delta polity of Hindu Tondo, which was the previous preeminent state in Luzon before the Brunei Sultanate established their puppet-kingdom, Islamic Manila, to supplant Tondo, Juan de Salcedo, then about 22 years old, fell in love with the 18-year-old "Dayang-dayang" (a native Filipino word for "Princess") Kandarapa, so named after the lark of the rice fields, whose song she imitated by her beautiful singing voice, was said to be the niece of Rajah Lakandula, Tondo's Lakan ("Paramount ruler"). Juan fell in love, upon seeing the femininity of her figure while she and her handmaidens were bathing in the Pasig River. Salcedo had developed an admiration of Kandarapa's natural physical beauty, including her long black raven hair, exotic golden-brown skin features, and lavish royal lifestyle. He also appreciated the Princesses "Indio" (a Spanish word for indigenous Malay also known as North Indian due to the Hindu religion of Tondo and East Asian trading influence with the Far East) background.

Their love was completely against their forebears' wishes since Lakandula wanted his niece, Dayang-dayang Kandarapa, to be married to the Rajah of Macabebe which Kandarapa didn't want as he was already married multiple times to other women due to his Islamic custom; and Miguel López de Legazpi wanted his Mexican born grandson, Salcedo, to marry a pure Spanish woman. The Rajah of Macabebe who got word of the budding romance from Rajah Sulayman a fellow Muslim Rajah, of Manila, became enraged and he cried out:

"May the sun divide my body in two, the crocodiles eat it, and my wives become unfaithful, if I ever become the friend of the Spaniards!"

— (طارق بن زياد )Tariq Sulayman, Rajah of Macabebe

The chieftain Rajah Tariq Sulayman then waged the Battle of Bangkusay against the Spaniards, to counter-act which, Spanish general Miguel López de Legazpi dispatched Martin de Goiti and Juan de Salcedo to the battlefield where they slayed Sulayman through a cannon shot to the chest, thereby falling overboard to be eaten by the crocodiles he swore by. The Spanish were afterward overloaded with loot and prisoners. Among the detainees were Lakandula's son and nephew, whom López de Legazpi freed while concealing his knowledge of the rajahs of Tondo's betrayal. De Goiti sailed into Bulakan through the twisting channels of the Pampanga, bringing Lakandula and Rajah Sulayman with them to urge the inhabitants to submit. López de Legazpi imprisoned Lakandula after he returned to Tondo without authorization despite his eloquence in persuading the other datus (chieftains) to join the Spaniards. When de Goiti and Salcedo returned, of course, Salcedo petitioned for Lakandula's freedom, and he was released.

Afterwards Juan and Kandarapa secretly married, Juan and Kandarapa exchanged letters and rings, hoping that the future will resolve their problems and offer them happiness. Fray Alvarado quickly catechized and baptized Kandarapa, along with many other members of Lakandula's family, to the Catholic faith and gave Kandarapa the Christian name Dolores. Her Spanish name was Dolores de Salcedo. Kandarapa sent Salcedo a message within a cluster of white lotus flowers (The lotus flower is the most sacred flower in Tantric Mysticism since it is pure and beautiful despite growing from the mud of its surroundings. It is simultaneously a chief symbol of the Hindu God Vishnu and associated with Zen Buddhism as well.) However, princess Kandarapa mistakenly thought that Salcedo had been unfaithful to her as a result of the disapproving López de Legazpi sending his Mexican grandson on far flung expeditions to deter his love for Kandarapa, and even lying that his grandson had married the daughter of the Rajah of Kaog, Santa Lucia. So, she died of a broken heart. Upon going back from his campaigns, Salcedo learned of her death and yet kept her token of fidelity with him until the end. It is said that when he died in Ilocos, he had in his breast pocket, the dried leaves of the Lotus flowers Kandarapa gave him. This romance, as recorded by Don Felipe Cepeda in Mexico, was picked up by the Catalonian Jesuit, Rev. Fr. Jose Ibañez, who published this romance in Spain.

== Legacy ==
His remains are laid to rest on a knight's tomb in San Agustin Church in Intramuros in the Philippines.

== See also ==
- History of the Philippines

== Bibliography ==
- Borja, Marciano (2012). Basques in the Philippines. University of Nevada Press. ISBN 9780874178913.
- Morga, Antonio de. (2004). The Project Gutenberg Edition Book : History of the Philippine Islands – 1521 to the beginning of the XVII century. Volume 1 and 2.
- Legazpi, Don Miguel López de. (1563–1572). Cartas al Rey Don Felipe II : sobre la expedicion, conquistas y progresos de las islas Felipinas. Sevilla, España.
