= Felipe de Salcedo =

Spanish conquistador

Felipe de Salcedo was a Spanish explorer who was a member of the López de Legazpi expedition to the Philippines in the 16th century. He accompanied his brother, Juan de Salcedo and his grandfather, Miguel López de Legazpi, in 1564 for their colonization of the East Indies and the Pacific. He commanded 1 ship, out of 5 fleets that sailed from Mexico to the Philippines. The ship, which had 300 men on board, arrived in Cebu in 1567.

== Source ==
- Dunmore, John: Who's Who in Pacific Navigation. Entry: Salcedo. University of Hawai'i Press. 1991, p. 218–219.

== See also ==
- History of the Philippines
