= Sangley Rebellion (1639) =

Second Sangley Rebellion
- Part of the Spanish colonization of the Philippines, Sino-Spanish conflicts, Philippine revolts against Spain, and Anti-Chinese sentiment in the Philippines
Date	1639–1640
Location	Luzon, Spanish Philippines
Result	Spanish repression and massacre of Sangley Chinese

Belligerents
Spanish Empire: Spanish Philippines; Japanese residents of Spanish Philippines	Sangley Chinese residents of Spanish Philippines

Commanders and leaders
Sebastián Hurtado de Corcuera; Martín de Aduna; Juan de Arceo; Domingo Ruiz; Martín de Ocarez	Unknown

Casualties and losses
45 Spanish soldiers 300 Tagalog militiamen Unknown number of Japanese residents	Unknown
- 22,000–24,000 Chinese civilians killed

The Second Sangley Rebellion was an uprising of rural Sangley residents in Manila against the Spanish Philippines in 1639. It resulted in the massacre of around 17,000-22,000 ethnic Chinese people.

== Background ==
After the first Sangley Rebellion in 1603, conditions for the Chinese residents in Manila returned to some degree of normalcy for a time. However as the ethnic Chinese population continued to prosper, they incurred heavier restrictions from the Spanish colonial regime. Although they were exempt from labor and petty personal dues required of the local Tagalogs, the ethnic Chinese residents had to pay a license fee of 8 pesos per year with additional extortion and harassment from sellers. They were also subject to population control in addition to the license fee, with an idealized limit of 6,000, but in reality the Chinese population in 1620s and 1630s ranged from 15,000 to 21,000. The Chinese residents petitioned the king of Spain for self-governance but this was rejected in 1630. As the Chinese population continued to swell, reaching 33,000-45,000 by 1639, they entered other industries such as farming. They were laborers on their own in outlying areas, employed on estates of religious orders, or used as farm labor in forced settlement projects. This large rural Chinese population rebelled again in 1639, resulting in another massacre.

== Rebellion ==
The rebellion of 1639 occurred in rural Luzon where most of the rebels came from. It started at Calamba, where several thousand Chinese residents had been coerced to settle and forced to pay substantial rent to the Spanish authorities. It was a very unhealthy place and about 300 of them had already died by the time of the rebellion on November 20. The rebels advanced towards Manila and by November 22, had taken the San Pedro Macati Church on the eastern outskirts of the city. The Chinatown was only briefly occupied by them. Although well-organized, the rebellion was poorly armed and could not stand up to the Spanish and local Tagalog forces, which routed them upon their arrival. However uprisings were reported in other areas as well and from November 26 to December 2, the Chinese residents controlled the north bank of the Pasig River (modern-day Binondo).

On December 2, the Chinese settlement revolted and started fires. The Spanish soldiers began firing on the Chinese rebels from the city walls of Manila (modern-day Intramuros). On December 5, the Spanish authorities ordered the execution of any ethnic Chinese resident that could be found, with a reward for each Chinese head. The Chinese residents were systematically rounded up and killed ten at a time. In total some 17,000 to 22,000 Chinese residents were slaughtered. Some Chinese residents fled to the mountains but were eventually dislodged. Around 6,000-7,000 Chinese rebels held out on the eastern shore of Laguna de Bay until March 15, 1640, when they were surrounded and forced to surrender.

== See also ==
- Sino-Spanish conflicts
- Battle of Manila

== Bibliography ==
- Willis, John E. (1998), Relations with the Maritime Europeans, 1514-1662
