= Sworn brotherhood (China) =

Chinese term for a type of male relationship

Sworn brotherhood (Chinese: 契兄弟; pinyin: qì xiōng dì; Cantonese Yale: kai1 hing1 dai6) in China is a term that evolved to denote a relationship analogous to contemporary male homosexuality. Although the written term is identical for both meanings, their pronunciations in the Fuzhou dialect differ, serving to distinguish whether it refers to ordinary sworn brotherhood or a relationship involving male eroticism and sexual relations. This practice was prevalent in Fujian during the Ming and Qing dynasties. Similar terms include “Qifu” (Chinese: 契父; pinyin: qì fù) and "Qier" (simplified Chinese: 契儿; traditional Chinese: 契兒; pinyin: qì ér), meaning sworn father and sworn son, or collectively "Qifuzi" (Chinese: 契父子; pinyin: qì fù zǐ; Cantonese Yale: hat1 fu6 zi2).

== History ==
During the Ming and Qing dynasties, homosexuality among men ("nán fēng" 男风) was widespread in Fujian, and also popular in the Wenzhou-Taizhou (温台) region, where it was called "mengxiongdi" (盟兄弟, pledged brothers). Shen Defu (沈德符) wrote in his late Ming work Wanli Yehuo Bian (Supplement, Vol. 3) (《万历野获编·补遗卷三》): "The people of Fujian place extreme importance on male beauty. Regardless of status or appearance, they form bonds according to their kind: the elder is the 'qixiong' (契兄, sworn elder brother), the younger is the 'qidi' (契弟, sworn younger brother)." The parents of the "Qidi" regarded the "Qixiong" much like a son-in-law. When the "Qidi" married a woman, the "Qixiong" bore the expenses. "There were even cases of reporting infidelity in such relationships, termed 'jijian' (㚻奸, homosexual adultery)." Some "Qixiongdi" maintained their relationship even after one or both had married wives, sometimes remaining close beyond the age of thirty. Since men who became "Qixiongdi" could still marry women and continue their family line, this practice did not disrupt the lineage-centric patriarchal system.

Chinese scholars generally offer three explanations for the prevalence of male homosexuality in Ming-Qing Fujian:

1. Severe Gender Imbalance and Marriage Squeeze: A significant surplus of males made it difficult for many men to find wives. In the Ming Hongzhi era (弘治十五年, 1502), men constituted 74.63% of Fujian's population. Modern researchers cite 18th-century data showing over 25% of men aged 25 and above in Fujian and Zhejiang provinces remained unmarried, far exceeding the national average of 15.37%.
2. Geographical Factors: Fujian's environment—characterized by limited arable land, mountainous terrain, and proximity to the sea—led to prolonged periods of men living away from home for work or overseas trade.
3. Buddhist Influence: The flourishing of Buddhism was seen as encouraging homosexual practices.

However, a Korean scholar argues that these three explanations address the conditions of a "single-sex environment" fostering homosexuality, not the direct cause. The direct cause was "the prevailing culture of 'nanfeng' (male homosexuality) that swept through society at the time." Furthermore, the notion that "Fujian was a place where 'nanfeng' was especially rampant" was itself a concept proposed by literati of that period.

== The extended meaning of the term ==
Originally meaning "sworn/pledged younger brother" or "adopted brother," "Qidi" acquired additional connotations of "male prostitute" and "catamite" from the historical custom in Fujian and Guangdong where men formed homosexual relationships as "Qixiongdi" (契兄弟). Consequently, "Qidi" further extended into other derogatory meanings, often used to insult someone or describe them doing something bad.

Fuzhou dialect:

(野)契弟 "(iā) kié-dâ̤" (iɑ^{21} kʰie^{53} lɑ^{242}) (Note: Bàng-uâ-cê are pronounced as single words, and the international phonetic symbols attached are the actual pronunciations.); meaning "lousy," "no-good," or "terrible" (野 is a Fuzhou dialect adverb meaning “very")

做契弟 "có̤ kié-dâ̤" (tsɔ^{21} kʰie^{53} lɑ^{242} ); meaning "to suffer misfortune," "to be unlucky," or "to play dirty tricks/scheme" (literally "to act like a 契弟")

Cantonese:

"kai3 dai6" - Means "bastard," "scoundrel," or "idiot."

"zeng3 kai3 dai6" (Chinese: 正契弟; pinyin: zhèng qì dì; Cantonese Yale: zeng3 kai3 dai6) - A common insult meaning "utter bastard" or "complete scoundrel."

In the Fuzhou dialect, the pronunciation distinguishes the meanings.

Sworn younger brother: "kié-diê" (kʰie^{53} tiɛ^{242})

Male prostitute/catamite (and derived insults): "kié-dâ̤" (kʰie^{53} lɑ^{242})

In Cantonese, however, both meanings share the identical pronunciation. This overlap makes the term highly offensive. Cantonese speakers avoid calling others or being called "Qidi" to prevent misunderstanding. Instead, they use:

"kai3 sai3 lou2" (契細佬) - Literally "sworn younger brother" (using the common word "sailou" for brother).

Formal terms: "Yidi" (義弟 - righteous brother), "Yidi" (誼弟 - sworn brother), or "Jiebai didi" (結拜弟弟 - pledged younger brother).
