= Francisco de Sande =

Spanish governor and captain-general (1540–1602)

Doctor Francisco de Sande

3rd Governor General of the Philippines
- In office August 25, 1575 – April 1580
- Monarch: Philip II of Spain
- Governor: (Viceroy of New Spain); Martín Enríquez de Almanza
- Preceded by: Guido de Lavezaris
- Succeeded by: Gonzalo Ronquillo de Peñaloza

Personal details
- Born: 1540 Cáceres, Spain
- Died: 12 September 1602 (aged 61–62) New Spain
- Occupation: attorney, jurist, auditor, colonial administrator

Francisco de Sande Picón (1540 – September 12, 1602) was the third Spanish governor and captain-general of the Philippines from August 25, 1575 to April 1580. He established the Royal City of Nueva Cáceres, now known as Naga City.

== Early career ==
A native of Cáceres and a relative of Álvaro de Sande, he served as attorney, criminal judge, and auditor in Mexico. He succeeded Guido de Lavezaris, a member of the 1543 Ruy López de Villalobos Expedition from Barra de Navidad, Jalisco, Mexico, on August 25, 1575.

In 1575, King Philip II of Spain appointed him as the governor-general of the Philippines.

== Governorship in the Philippines ==
One of his first acts of political advocacy was to disestablish vast encomiendas of wealthy Spaniards in the Philippines. In 1576, he issued a decree forbidding all officials appointed by the Crown to own encomiendas that were initially for Indios. He also established the city of Nueva Cáceres, province of Camarines Sur, Bicol region, Island of Luzon, the largest of the some 7,107 islands (under Spanish Administration till 1898, for some 350–370 years), Philippine Islands. A few years after, Spanish and Dominican prelate Domingo de Salazar requested to create monasteries for the Dominicans; this was granted by Sande through King Philip II's royal decree.

During his time, the first Augustinian priests arrived to Manila on July 1, 1577, coming from Acapulco, Mexico. Also in 1577, the Church of San Agustin was erected at the same city.

He also commissioned an expedition to Borneo in 1578, where the Sultan of Jolo became a vassal of Spain through a peace treaty signed at Río Grande de Mindanao. That same year, he attacked Borneo, and the sultan of that sultanate (present day Brunei) became submissive to the Spanish officials of Manila. He also showed eagerness to conquer Moluccas from the Portuguese as well as China.

In 1579, he sent an expedition again, headed by Captain Gabriel de Ribera to Mindanao and Jolo, to secure Moro submission to Spanish authority. He went to the Rio Grande to find nothing but remnants of villages abandoned by the locals. He then established a fortress for the villages and went north to pacify the rebelling Butuanons. Upon his return to Luzon, Ribera met some natives from Jolo with little tribute, saying that they had nothing to give to the Spaniards since the Portuguese Estevan Rodriguez de Figueroa had recently attacked their settlements.

In the same year, he denied the Franciscan fathers their burning wishes, after some 19,000 km. travel, to enter China to spread Catholicism, the Chinese being stupefied when some of them disobeyed the Manila Spanish Civil Authorities and arrived at the highly controlled Portuguese trade city of Macao, where they found that they did not carry weapons, money or goods to exchange but only some religious liturgical ware for their own use and Catholic books.

== In Central America ==
In June 1580, he was relieved of his post in the Philippines and returned to Mexico to resume his former position as judge of the Real Audiencia of Mexico. In August 1593, he was appointed inspector of the Real Audiencia of Guatemala. He then became president of that Real Audiencia, remaining in this position until 1596, when, by royal decree, he was appointed president of the Real Audiencia of Santafé, as well as governor and captain general of the New Kingdom of Granada (today Colombia).

== See also ==
- Limahong

Political offices
Preceded by Guido de Lavezaris	Governor and Captain-General of the Philippines; 1575–1580	Succeeded by Gonzalo Ronquillo de Peñaloza
