= Limahong =

16th-century Chinese pirate

- 林阿鳳
- Born: Raoping, Chaozhou, Great Ming
- Occupations: Pirate, warlord
- Years active: 1571–1589
- Opponents: Spanish Empire; Ming dynasty

Limahong
- Traditional Chinese: 林阿鳳
- Simplified Chinese: 林阿凤
Transcriptions
Standard Mandarin
- Hanyu Pinyin: Lín Āfèng
- Wade–Giles: Lin^{2} A^{1}-fêng^{4}
Southern Min
- Hokkien POJ: Lîm A-hōng
- Teochew Peng'im: Lim⁵ A¹hong⁶

Alternative Chinese name
- Traditional Chinese: 林鳳
- Simplified Chinese: 林凤
Transcriptions
Standard Mandarin
- Hanyu Pinyin: Lín Fèng
- Wade–Giles: Lin^{2} Fêng^{4}
Southern Min
- Hokkien POJ: Lîm Hōng
- Teochew Peng'im: Lim⁵ Hong⁶

Limahong, Lim Hong, or Lin Feng (Note: Teochew Chinese: 林鳳, Pe̍h-ūe-jī: Lîm Hõng, Pe̍h-ōe-jī: Lîm Hōng), well known as Ah Hong (Note: Teochew Chinese: 阿鳳, Pe̍h-ūe-jī: A-hõng, Pe̍h-ōe-jī: A-hōng) or Lim-A-Hong or Limahon, (Note: Teochew Chinese: 林阿鳳 Pe̍h-ūe-jī: Lîm A-hõng, Pe̍h-ōe-jī: Lîm A-hōng) was a Chinese pirate and warlord who invaded the northern Philippines in 1574. He built up a reputation for his constant raids on the port cities of Guangdong, Fujian, and elsewhere in southern China. He is noted to have twice attempted, and failed, to invade the Spanish city of Manila in 1574. Afterwards, he sailed north into Lingayen Gulf and landed on the Agno River delta in Pangasinan, negotiating with locals to establish a fort. His attempt to enforce tribute from them by purporting his victory over the Spanish immediately backfired as Spanish-Luzonese forces laid siege on his fort for several months, narrowly escaping with some of his forces to never be seen again.

== Origins ==
Portrait of Limahong's attack from La Illustración Filipina, 1894

Wokou merchant-pirates became a serious problem along the China coast in the early 16th century. Merchant-pirates such as Wang Zhi, Ye Zongman, Li Guangtou, and Xu Dong constructed large trading ships in Guangdong and Shuangyu, where they established clandestine trade relations between Japan, China, Vietnam, and Korea. Aided by the Portuguese, pirate activities peaked between 1553 and 1561, and included a raid in 1556 consisting of more than 20,000^{20,000 what?}. This clandestine trade extended to the Philippines, with Miguel López de Legazpi reporting in 1567, annual visits by Japanese and Chinese traders. Increased Chinese navy patrols forced pirates such as Lin Daoqian to escape to Luzon, although temporarily.

Likewise, Limahon successfully attacked Shenquan in 1571, but was then defeated in 1572 at Chenghai, forcing him to flee to Luzon. The Chinese General Liu Yaohui sent a fleet that temporarily drove Limahon from his fortified trading base on Luzon, but by 1574, Limahon was pirating along the Chinese coast once again.

Venturing once again back to Luzon, Limahon was able to capture a Chinese merchant ship engaged in trade with the Spanish. Robbing this merchant of his gold and silver, Limahon learned more gold and silver was to be gained from the Spanish further south, and in the words of Francisco de Sande, "there would be no one with whom to fight." Limahon's fleet of 62–70 ships, 3000 pirates, and 400 Japanese soldiers, set sail for Manila. Along the way, Limahon encountered a Spanish galiot, sent by Juan de Salcedo for provisions while his force of 100 men were in Vigan. The galiot was quickly overcome, the 22 Spanish aboard killed, and their falconet captured. Seeing Limahon's true intent, Salcedo sent an advance force onwards to Manila, warning of Limahon's approach, and assuring everyone that Salcedo was on his way to help. Limahong was also known to have a relationship with a male crew named Eng Kang through the traditional Fujian sworn brotherhood custom, where he is treated as the "son-in-law" of Eng Kang's parents. Unlike most under the custom, Limahong and Eng Kang's relationship was sexual, not just "brotherly".

== Attack on Manila ==
Arriving on Saint Andrew's Day eve, Limahon landed 700 of his men ashore the next day. Clad in cotton corselets with bamboo helmets, but armed with pikes, arquebusses, battle axes, cutlasses and daggers, they proceeded barefoot towards the city, where they arrived by 10 am. Fortunately for the defense of Manila, Limahon's men first had to deal with master of the camp Martin de Goiti, who lost his life. This delay allowed Captains Velasquez and Chacon to bring forward men with whom to confront the pirates on the beach. After suffering 80 casualties to the Spanish 14, the Chinese retreated to their boats, making their way to Limahon who had set up base in the port of Cavite. Limahon decided to rest a day before proceeding with the attack.

In the meantime, the Spanish were able to build a defensive palisade, and Salcedo arrived with 50 men. By daybreak on the third day, Limahon's entire fleet appeared offshore and fired three volleys before putting men ashore to attack the Spanish fort. About 80 Chinese were able to enter the fort but were immediately killed, forcing another Chinese retreat, but not before they were able to burn the San Agustin Church in Manila and a galley. The Spanish also had to deal with a Moro revolt at the same time, after two Moro leaders were killed while in a Spanish prison.

Yet Limahon's men retreated once again and his fleet set sail for Ylocos, leaving behind more than 200 Chinese dead. Consequently, the Moro revolt quickly ended. The Spanish suffered three dead and several wounded.

== In Pangasinan ==
Limahong retreated to Pangasinan, where he decided to settle, building a fort and counter fort. The fort walls were made from palm logs, while the counter fort used palm planks. Limahong was able to seize several nearby village chiefs, forcing the villagers to provide him with provisions.

Juan de Salcedo was made master of camp, a fort was built to better protect Manila, and plans were made to send an expedition against Limahon. Salcedo's expedition of 256 men, with 2500 native allies, set sail on 23 March 1575, with 59 vessels commanded by Captains Chacon, Chaves, Ribera, and Ramirez. They arrived at Pangasinan on Holy Wednesday, 30 March.

Salcedo set about blockading the Agno River, landing men and artillery. He then sent Captains Pedro de Chaves and Chacon up the river in nine small boats, with eight men each, to capture any Chinese boats. Salcedo also sent Capt. Ribera and 28 men to assault Limahon's fort from the land side. At the same time, 35 Chinese vessels were departing in a search for provisions, and when Limahon's men caught sight of the Spanish, they panicked, and fled to their fort. Thus, the Chinese abandoned their vessels to the Spanish, who promptly burned them.

In the meantime, Capt. Ribera succeeded in gaining entrance to Limahon's fort capturing 100 women and children. Yet, the approach of night forced the Spanish to retreat. The Chinese were able to regroup and a long four-month siege ensued. Limahon made use of the time to build 30 ships within his fort. On 4 August, Limahon set sail and made good his escape.

Shortly before the escape of Limahong, a Chinese fleet under Wang Wanggao (王望高; known in Spanish sources as Omocon), arrived to spy on Limahon. Once Wang saw that Limahon was besieged, Wang departed for China with the news, taking along some of the Spanish, including some friars.

== Later activities ==
After Limahong's defeat in Pangasinan, he and his remaining crew probably escaped to Guangdong, and then to Taiwan. Though the Ming Veritable Records claimed that he surrendered to the Spanish and Luzonese forces in 1576, he reappeared in a 1589 report of his raids along the South China Coast, joined with the forces of Chen Dele and Li Mao. After this, he disappeared from the historical record.

== Legacy ==
The threat presented by Limahong created a profound sense of distrust between the Spanish and the Chinese population in the Philippines. Because of the implicit threat of the Chinese empires and the precariousness of the Spanish position over the Philippines, the Spanish massacred Chinese Filipinos in Manila "nearly once per generation," starting in 1603.

Limahong was the first of many seaborne threats that spurred the construction of fortifications and surveillance architecture in the Philippines. For the Spanish, Limahong's attack became a mark of colonial insecurity, even from threats that did not come from China. More than three decades later, Governor-General Pedro Bravo de Acuña even invoked the invasion of Limahong when discussing Dutch piracy with the Viceroy of Fujian. The political effect of Limahong's invasion thus persisted long after its economic harm it had caused.

Recent historians have re-evaluated Limahong's legacy and goals. Teresita Ang See argued that Limahong and his band should not be thought of as invaders but rather as impoverished victims of government oppression who resorted to banditry and piracy as a last resort, first in their native places and then on the high seas. Because Limahong did not initially attack with his full force and had brought women and children with him, Ang See speculated that he had actually intended to negotiate for refuge in Manila, but was forced to attack when his intentions were misinterpreted. Philip Guingona described Limahong's attempt to colonize the Philippines as an "instance of Hokkien political maneuvering" to protect the autonomy of Hokkien people comparable to early 1920s attempts by the Hokkien diaspora in the Philippines to establish an independent state in Fujian.

Former Filipino President Ferdinand Marcos claimed to be a descendant of Limahong. This claim was repeated by his son and president Bongbong Marcos. Sterling Seagrave claimed that this was intended as a tacit acknowledgement that the elder Marcos was the secret son of his Chinese godfather Ferdinand Chua. However, James Hamilton-Paterson doubted this speculation because, even in the wake of the elder Marcos's deposing in 1986, this theory did not appear in Filipino literature, despite the absolution it would bring to Filipinos and the Sinophobia of the period.

== Popular culture ==
Limahong is mentioned in:

- Walter Robb's essay Walls of Manila.
- René Jouglet's adventure novel, La ville perdue (1936).
