= Padma (Vishnu) =

Lotus attribute of Vishnu

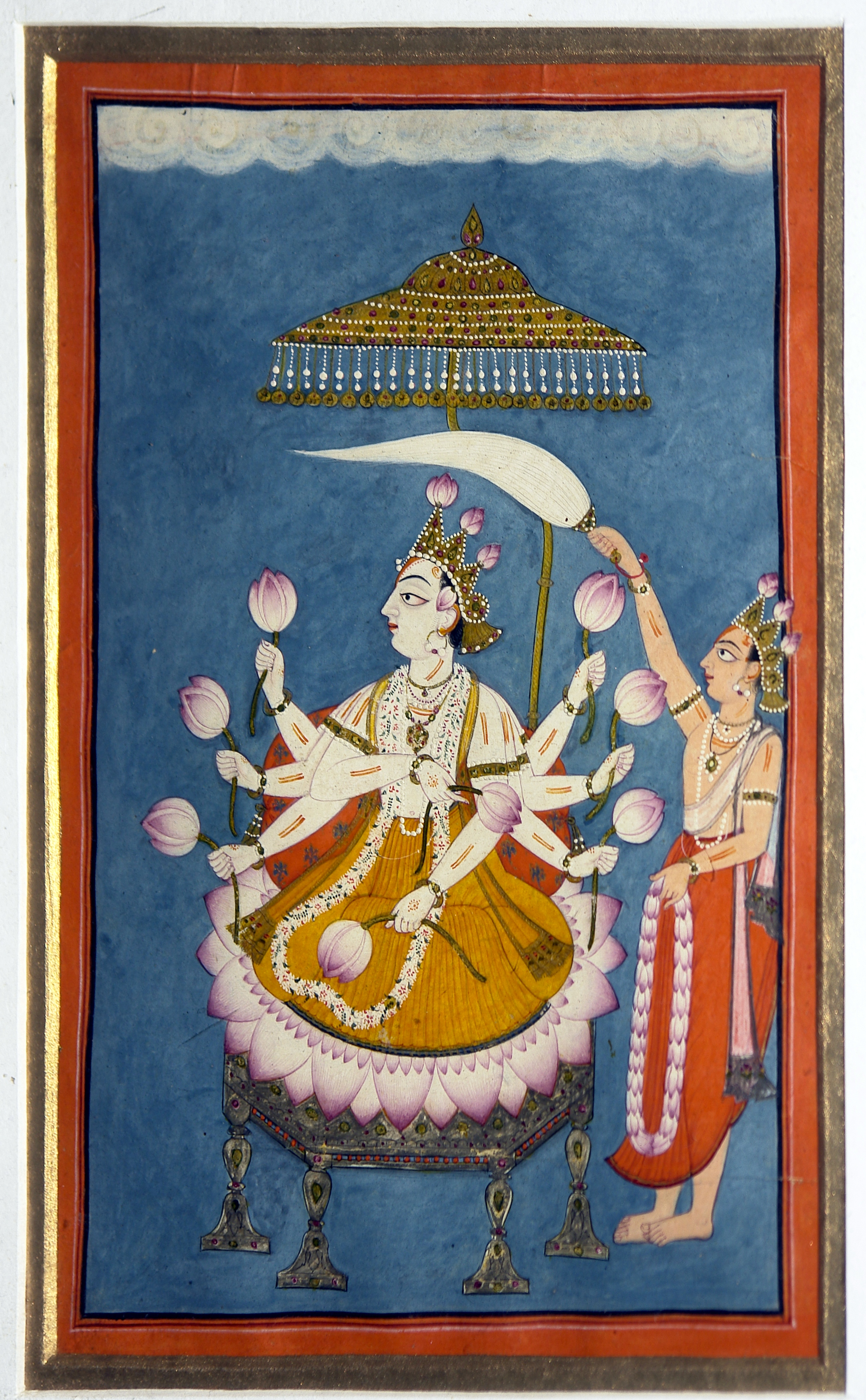
Painting of Vishnu depicted with lotuses, National Museum, New Delhi

Padma (Sanskrit: पद्म, romanized: Padma, lit. 'Lotus') is one of the four attributes borne by Vishnu in his iconography. It is associated with Vishnu's abode upon water, as well as his role in creation and birth.

== Mythology ==
In the Vishnu Purana, in the beginning of time, Brahma is described to have been created within a lotus blooming from the navel of Vishnu. The padma is hence prominent in the Vaishnava narrative of cosmogony, where Brahma is instructed by Vishnu to start generating the universe and the rest of creation. The lotus is regarded to be a representation of dharma, the cosmic law, as well the epitome of purity, as it rose beneath the impure seabed towards the sun.

During the Samudra Manthanam, when Lakshmi chooses Vishnu as her eternal consort, she throws a garland of lotuses around his neck, and is also eulogised as the lotus-faced one.

In the legend of the Gajendra Moksham, the elephant Gajendra holds a lotus as an offering to Vishnu as he arrives to save his devotee from a crocodile.

The realm of Krishna, Goloka, is evoked as Vrindavana upon the earth, portrayed in the form of a lotus.

Vishnu is generally depicted as holding the lotus in his lower left hand, while his consort Lakshmi holds one in her right hand, and the goddess is also usually portrayed as sitting on the flower.

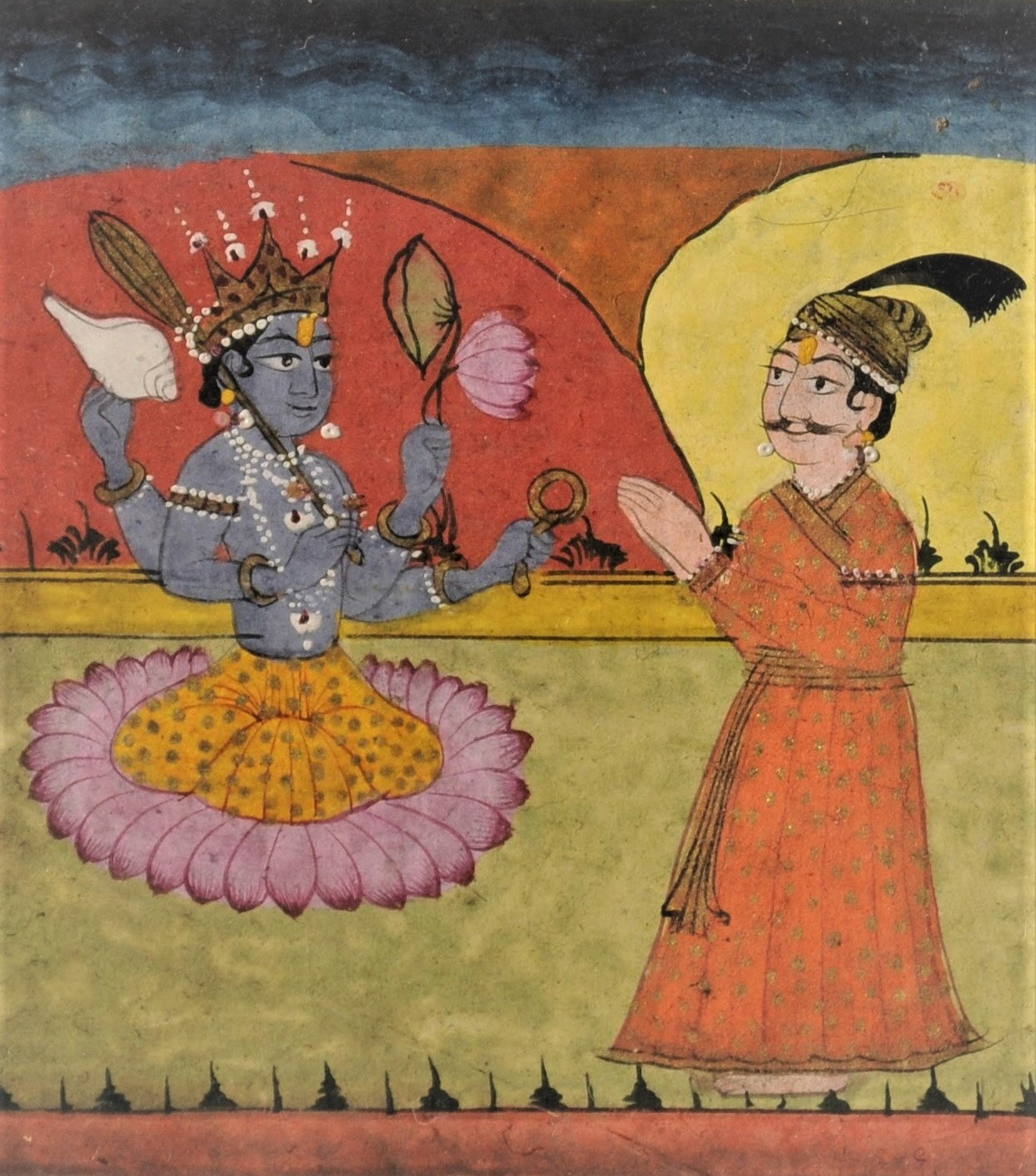
Vishnu seated upon a lotus and granting an audience to Parikshit

A Shaiva myth describes Vishnu's worship of Shiva with 1008 lotus flowers, offering one for each of his epithets. In order to test him, Shiva removed one lotus from the bunch so that Vishnu would be one short and the puja would be incomplete. However, the omniscient Vishnu merely plucked one of his lotus eyes, placing it upon the lingam. Pleased, Shiva presents him with the Sudarshana Chakra.

== Symbolism ==
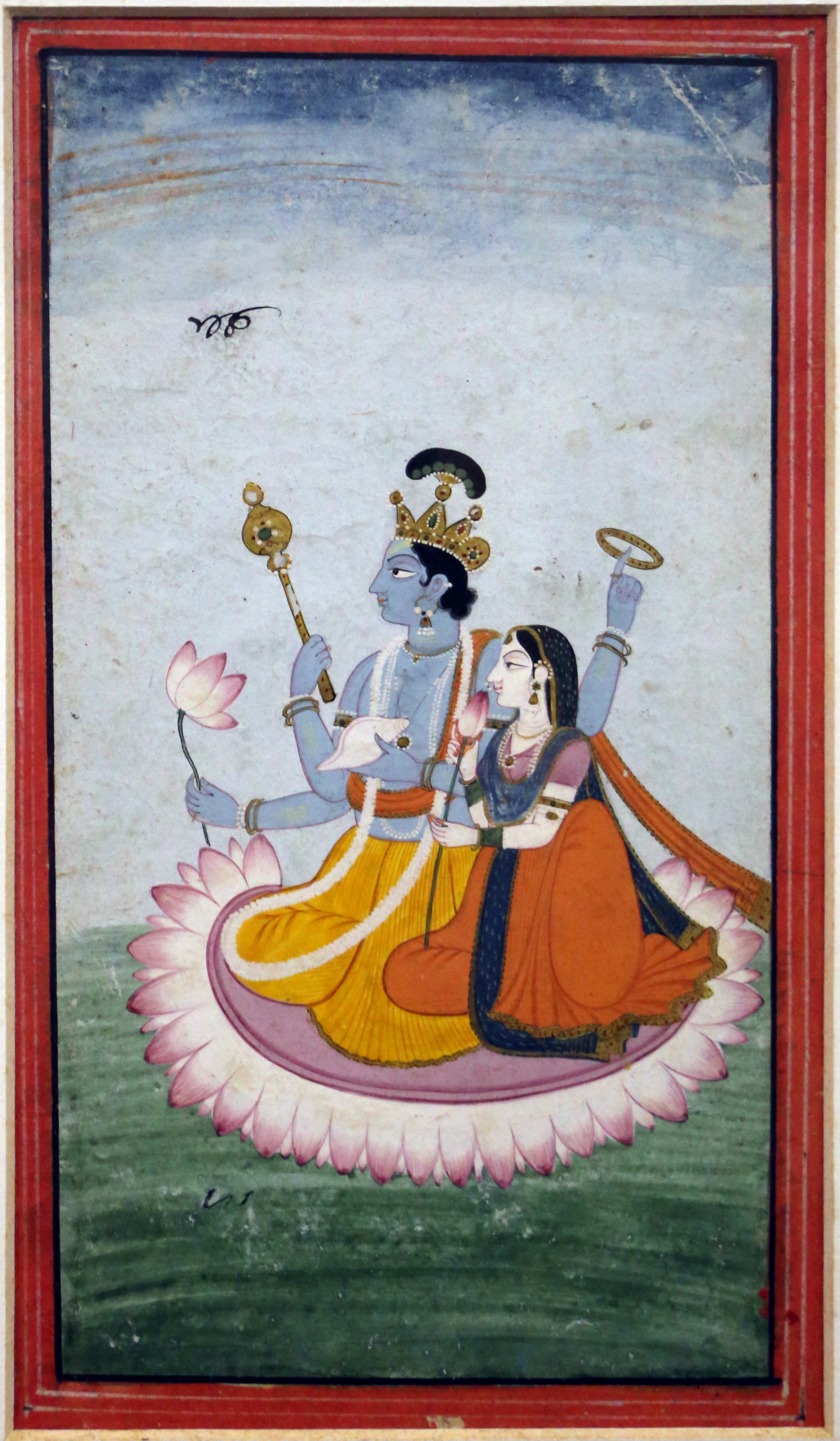
Vishnu and Lakshmi seated upon a lotus

It is believed that Vishnu's association of the lotus is derived from the flower's presence in the symbolism of his consort, Lakshmi, for whom it represented water and fertility. Sculptures of Vishnu bearing a lotus are dated back to the fifth or the sixth century, presenting him with the epithets Padmanabha (the one with the lotus-navel), Pundarikaksha (lotus-eyed), and Padmapani (lotus-handed). Icons of Narasimha with a lotus growing out of the deity's head have been dated back to the mid-sixth century. On one level, the conch and lotus in Vishnu's hands signify his association with the waters as both a fertilising agent and a cosmic symbol. The conch and the lotus are among the most auspicious symbols, and by themselves are often painted on either side of the entrance to a domestic building. The lotus also symbolises the earth and is even said to contain the universe, and hence it is especially appropriate as an emblem for the divine preserver of the universe. The Vishnudharmottara specifically states that the lotus emerging from Vishnu's navel symbolises the earth, while the stalk represents the cosmic mountain, Meru, the axis of the universe. In Vishnu's hand, it symbolises water, and in Lakshmi's hand, wealth. A piece of the Varaha avatar of Vishnu and his consort Bhudevi has also been discovered dating back to the third century. Bhudevi herself stands upon a lotus, while Varaha holds a lotus bud with his left hand to represent his effortless act of holding the earth.

== Literature ==
Vaishnava hymns often reference the padma as an attribute of Vishnu or Narayana, offering allusions to his lotus-feet, lotus-eyes, lotus-navel, and lotus-throat.

The Padma Purana is one of the eighteen major Puranas that is named after the attribute of Vishnu, and contains large sections dedicated to his praise.
