= Takekoshi Yosaburō =

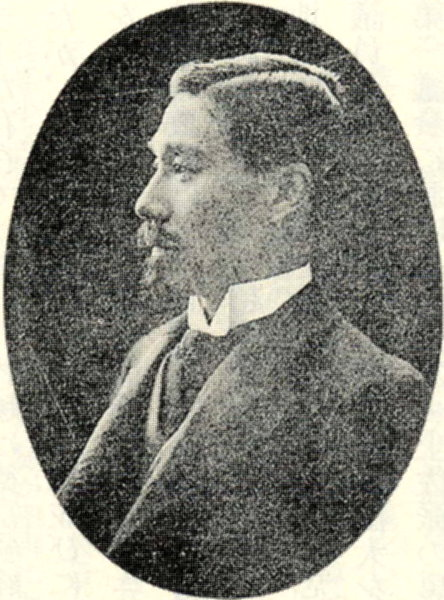
Takekoshi Yosaburō

Takekoshi Yosaburō (竹越 與三郎; November 22, 1865 – January 12, 1950) was a Japanese historian and politician, member of the Diet and Privy councillor. He was a graduate of Keiō Gijuku.

Takekoshi was a committed advocate of Japanese expansion into the South Seas, rather than China.

Among his works published in English are Japanese Rule in Formosa and a monumental Economic Aspects of the Civilization of Japan, which includes a wealth of quantitative data from pre-modern sources.
