= Sino-Spanish conflicts =

Military and colonial history in the Spanish Philippines

- Part of the Spanish colonization of the Philippines, Philippine revolts against Spain, and Anti-Chinese sentiment in the Philippines
Date	1500s–1800s
Location	Spanish Philippines

Belligerents
Chinese residents of the Philippines; Supported by: Kingdom of Tungning; Sulu Sultanate; Maguindanao Sultanate; Sultanates of Lanao	Spanish Empire: Captaincy General of the Philippines

Commanders and leaders
Koxinga; Zheng Jing; Datu Teteng	Gómez Pérez Dasmariñas †; Luis Pérez Dasmariñas †

The Sino-Spanish conflicts were a series of conflicts in the Spanish Philippines, between the authorities of the Spanish Empire and its ethnic Chinese residents, from the 16th and 18th centuries. The conflicts led to the assassination of Spanish constables and two Spanish governor generals, massacres of Sangley Chinese residents, and Spain losing the Maluku Islands.

== History ==
Colonization of the Philippines began in 1565 with the Spanish conquest of the archipelago. Spanish rule of the Philippines was constantly threatened by indigenous rebellions, including the Muslim Moro people, and external invasions from the Dutch, Chinese, Japanese, and British.

=== 1593 murder of the Spanish governor-general ===
In 1593, Governor-General of the Spanish Philippines, Gómez Pérez Dasmariñas, organized an expedition from Manila to capture the fort at Ternate, in the Maluku Islands. His fleet included over 200 ships and 900 Spaniards; his flagship galley was manned by 250 hired Chinese rowers. On the third day of the journey, while the governor's fleet was anchored off the coast of Luzon, the Chinese rowers, led by Pan Hewu, mutinied. Allegedly, the Spanish had whipped some of the Chinese rowers, leading to the revolt. The mutineers killed 66 Spaniards, including Pérez Dasmariñas, and another ten drowned while trying to escape; only 14 Spaniards survived the massacre. The Chinese rowers then looted the ship and attempted to flee to China.

Pérez Dasmariñas' son Luis Pérez Dasmariñas succeeded him as governor-general. The mutiny put Spain's plans to invade Mindanao on hold, as Luis Pérez Dasmariñas aborted the expedition and immediately returned to Manila to secure his position. Several days later, a fleet of Chinese ships also arrived in Manila, carrying many men but little merchandise for trade. The Spanish suspected that the Chinese had heard of the departure of the Spanish fleet for the Moluccas, and had attempted to conquer the now-defenseless islands. However, finding the city as strongly as ever, they made no hostile moves and quickly returned to China; neither side mentioned the apparent motive for the fleet's journey.

=== 1603 Sangley rebellion ===
In 1603, three Chinese mandarins arrived in Manila to investigate a report of a mountain of gold in Cavite. Spanish authorities suspected that these men were spying on the city and its fortifications, prompting them to increase defenses further. This in turn frightened the Chinese residents of Manila, who feared that the Spaniards were about to massacre them. In response, the Sangley revolted, setting fire to buildings in Tondo and Quiapo and massacring indigenous residents of Manila.

About 150 Spaniards under Luis Pérez Dasmariñas marched against the rebels to put down the rebellion. The Sangley defeated the Spaniards, killing all but four survivors. The Sangley rebels then stormed Intramuros, the old walled city of Manila, but they were repulsed and driven back to San Pablo del Monte. There, they were attacked by a large force of Spaniards and local Tagalogs, with 23,000 Sangley casualties. Many Chinese residents of Manila fled to the countryside or abroad.

=== 1639 Sangley rebellion ===
After the first Sangley Rebellion in 1603, conditions for the Chinese residents in Manila returned to some degree of normalcy. However, as the ethnic Chinese population continued to prosper, they incurred heavier restrictions from the Spanish. Although they were exempt from the forced labour and personal dues required of the natives, the Sangley residents had to pay a license fee of 8 pesos per year. They were also subject to population control, with the aim of limiting their population to 6,000, although in reality the Chinese population in 1620s and 1630s ranged from 15,000 to 21,000. The Chinese residents petitioned the King Philip IV of Spain for self-government, but this was rejected in 1630. The Chinese population continued to swell, reaching 33,000 to 45,000 by 1639. Many were employed as agricultural labourers on the estates of religious orders or forced settlement projects.

In 1639, this large rural Chinese population Sangley Rebellion (1639) again. The uprising began at Calamba, where several thousand Chinese residents had been coerced to settle and forced to pay substantial rent to the Spanish. Conditions were poor, and about 300 had died by the time of the rebellion on 20 November. The rebels advanced towards Manila and made fast progress, taking the San Pedro Macati Church on the eastern outskirts of the city by 22 November. Although well-organized, the rebellion was poorly armed and could not stand up to the Spanish and local Tagalog forces, which routed them upon their arrival in the city.

Additional uprisings were reported in other areas of the country. On 26 November, the Chinese residents took control of the north bank of the Pasig River. On 2 December, the Spanish began firing on the rebels from the city walls. Three days later, the Spanish ordered the execution of any Chinese resident that could be found and placed a bounty on each; in total, it is estimated that 17,000 to 22,000 Chinese residents were murdered. Around 6,000 to 7,000 Chinese residents held out on the eastern shore of Laguna de Bay for over three months, until they were surrounded and forced to surrender on 15 March 1640.

=== 1662 Sangley massacre ===
In early 1662, the Southern Ming warlord Koxinga (Zheng Chenggong) defeated the Dutch colonial outpost in Taiwan at the Siege of Fort Zeelandia and established the Kingdom of Tungning with himself as the ruler. Several weeks later, on April 24, 1662, Koxinga demanded that the Spanish authorities in Manila pay him tribute, or else he would send a fleet to the city; he sent Italian Dominican missionary Vittorio Riccio, who had been living in Fujian province, as an ambassador to the governor of the Philippines to demand the submission of the archipelago. Governor Sabiniano Manrique de Lara declined to answer Koxinga and left Riccio waiting for an answer; meanwhile, the Spanish adopted measures to put the colony in a state of defense. The withdrew their forces from the Moluccas and Mindanao to reinforce Manila. Food and supplies were gathered in Manila in preparation for a siege, and the city walls and defenses were improved, as the residents of Manila waited anxiously for the attack.

Tensions between the Spanish, native Filipinos, and Chinese residents ran high; many Sangley residents suspected that the Spanish planned to massacre them. On May 24, a disturbance in the Chinese settlement resulted in a Spaniard being killed in the marketplace. The Spanish fired their cannons from the walls of Intramuros at the Chinese settlement (modern-day Binondo), killing many. The Spanish razed their own churches and convents in Manila to prevent Chinese from taking shelter in them. The Spanish governor ordered all non-Christian Chinese residents to leave Manila. It is uncertain how many fled, but 1300 Chinese residents were reported to have left on a single boat, while others escaped into the mountains. On June 4, the Spanish ordered all Chinese residents who had not reported to an assembly area to be killed. Juan de la Concepcion says that the original intention of the Spaniards was to kill all the Sangley residents, but they allegedly only stopped because they realized it would have been inconvenient if all the Chinese tradesmen and mechanics were killed. Reportedly, 20,000 Chinese were massacred, while approximately 3,000 fled to Formosa and just 5,000 survivors remained in Manila.

Riccio returned to Formosa and informed Koxinga of the massacre; the warlord was enraged and intended to invade the Spanish Philippines immediately. However, this invasion never occurred, because Koxinga died suddenly in 1662 of malaria. Koxinga's son Zheng Jing intended to continue his father's campaign to conquer the Philippines, but he was distracted by ongoing conflicts with the Dutch and never launched an invasion. Instead, he demanded Spain pay him tribute and grant him extrajudicial rights over the Chinese community in Manila, forbidding the Spanish to proselytize their religion to the Chinese residents. The Spanish Philippines ended up paying this tribute to the Kingdom of Tungning. Governor Manuel de León admitted the Spanish in the Philippines were weaker than the Chinese Tungning forces in Taiwan, saying "these provinces [the Philippines] are in no state to be complaining to the neighboring kings, with the ease with which they move to any altercation" in a letter to the Spanish Queen Mariana of Austria. The English and Dutch East India companies both agreed that Zheng Jing's invasion would have been successful against the Spanish as planned, after reviewing the weak state of Spanish defenses.

==== Effects on the Spanish-Moro conflicts ====
Throughout the early 1600s, the Moros raided and pillaged towns on Spanish-controlled islands, and various forts passed between Spanish and Moro control. In 1663, the Spanish were on the verge of victory over the Moros. However, in the wake of Koxinga's threat and the subsequent Chinese rebellion, Spain withdrew their forces from Mindanao and the Moluccas in order to reinforce Manila. The presidios of Zamboanga in Mindanao and the Cuyo Archipelago were abandoned and the forts were demolished. (The Jesuits attempted to rebuild the fort of Zamboanga in 1666 and 1672, but it was not until 1712 that the Spanish king ordered its reestablishment, and even then the project was not realized until 1718.)

The Moros took advantage of the Koxinga situation to attack the Spanish, particularly Spanish settlements in Mindanao and Visayan.

Spain would never recover the territories of Mindanao and the Moluccas from the Moro people. "The effects of the events cited above left Spanish prestige at a low ebb. Manila was no longer the principal commercial centre of the East and never again recovered that position. The century that followed from 1663–1762 has been described as one of obscurity for the Philippines."

=== 1686 rebellion plot ===
The Spanish constable in the Parian ghetto was killed by Chinese on 28 May 1686. The Spanish governor was also targeted.

=== 1700s expulsions ===
Unconverted Chinese residents were expelled from Manila in 1755 and 1766, leaving only Catholic Chinese mestizo residents behind. Chinese mestizos made up a huge fraction of the Philippine population and took over the retail trade from expelled Chinese residents.

When the Chinese residents were expelled from Manila in 1758, many of them went to Joló, where some 4,000 lived at the time of Cencelly's expedition. They sided with the natives of Jolo (Tausug and Sama) against the Spaniards and organized an armed troop to fight them.

On July 27, 1713, the tribunal, acting in a legislative capacity, decreed that within thirty days "all Moros, Armenians, Malabars, Chinese and other enemies of the Holy Faith" should be lodged in the Parián when visiting Manila, or when living there temporarily for purposes of visit or trade. Penalties were also prescribed for infractions.

=== 1770s conflicts ===
After Spanish persecution against Chinese residents in Luzon, thousands of Chinese residents fled to the Sultanate of Sulu (tributaries to the Ming Dynasty). There they assimilated into the Tausug-Sama people. Many Chinese residents then fought in Sulu's war against western colonialists, such as the 5 March 1775 attack against the Balambagan British outpost led by Chinese merchant Datu Teteng.

"In 1642 Generals Corcuero and Almonte made peace with Corralat, but piratical depredations by the Moros continued; Chinese rebellions embarrassed the Spaniards, who evacuated many places, and many fights were chronicled between the Moro fleets of Praus and the Spanish fleets. The priests egged on the Spanish, and the Spanish King re-established, and then abandoned, many stations in Mindoro, Basilan Mindanao and Jolo. Treaties were made and unmade. Expeditions intended to be punitive were undertaken. The Tawi-Tawi Moros nearly captured Zamboanga. Engagements were constant with varying success until 1737. King Philip V. of Spain, pestered the Sultans of Jolo and Tomantaca (Mindanao) about not being Christians, but expeditions were as frequent as baptisms."

Anda took what precautions were available to restrain the Moro pirates, but great difficulties arose. Ali-Mudin, whom the English had restored to his sway in Joló, and his son Israel (in whose favor the father abdicated) were friendly to the Spaniards, with many of their dattos; but another faction, led by Zalicaya, the commander of the Joloan armadas, favored the English, who had established themselves in 1762 on Balambangan in the Joló archipelago, which they had induced Bantilan to grant them. The English were accused of trying to incite the Joloans against the Spaniards by intrigue and bribery.

Anda sent an expedition to protest to the English their occupation of this Spanish territory, and entrusted this mission to an Italian officer named Giovanni Cencelly, who was then in command of one of the infantry regiments stationed at Manila; the latter sailed from Zamboanga December 30, 1773, bearing careful instructions to avoid any hostilities with the English and maintain friendship with the Joloans. But Cencelly seems to have been quite destitute of tact or judgment, and even of loyalty to his governor; for he disobeyed his instructions and angered the Joloans, who could hardly be restrained by Ali-Mudin from massacring the Spaniards, and at the end of three weeks was obliged to return to Zamboanga. He was on bad terms with the commandant there, Raimundo Español, and refused him any account of his proceedings at Joló. He even tried to stir up sedition among the Spanish troops against Español. The English gladly availed themselves of this opportunity to strengthen their own position in Joló, stirring up the islanders against Spain and erecting new forts. Later, however, the English at Balambangan showed so much harshness and contempt for the Moro dattos (even putting one in the pillory) that the latter plotted to surprise and kill the intruders; and on March 5, 1775, did so, killing all the English being except the commandant and five others, who managed to escape to their ship in the harbor.

The Moros seized the fort, thus acquiring great quantities of military supplies, arms, money, and food, along with several vessels. Among these spoils were forty-five cannons and $24,000 in silver. Elated by this success, Tenteng, the chief mover of the enterprise, tried to secure Zamboanga the same way; but the new commandant there, Juan Bayot, was on his guard, and the Moros did not succeed. Teteng then went to Cebú, where he committed horrible ravages. Other raids of this sort were carried out, and for a long time the Spaniards were unable to check them. A letter written to the king by Anda in 1773 had asked for money to build light armed vessels, and a royal order of January 27, 1776, commanded that 50,000 pesos be sent to Filipinas for this purpose. This money was used by Anda's temporary successor, Pedro Sarrio, for the construction of a squadron of vintas, "vessels which, on account of their swiftness and exceedingly light draft, were more suitable for the pursuit of the pirates than the very heavy galleys; they were, besides, to carry pilots of the royal fleet to reconnoiter the coasts, draw plans of the ports, indicate the shoals and reefs, take soundings in the sea, etc." "The Datos at once feared the vengeance of the English, and declared Tenteng unworthy of the rights of a Joloan and an outlaw from the kingdom with all his followers. Sultan Israel wrote to the governor of Zamboanga, assuring him that neither he nor the Datos had taken part in this transgression; and he asked the governor to send him the Curia filipica and the Empresas políticas of Saavedra, in order that he might be able to answer the charges which the English would make against him. (He had studied at the college of San José in Manila.)" Tenteng repaired to Joló with his booty and the captured English vessel; "these were arguments in his favor so convincing that he was at once admitted." He surrendered to the sultan all the military supplies and $2,000 in cash, and divided the spoils with the other datos; they received him with the utmost enthusiasm, and raised the ban from his head. "Around 1803, the squadron of General Alava returned to the Peninsula, the English again took possession of the island of Balanbangan; and it appears that they made endeavors to establish themselves in Joló, and were instigating the sultan and datos to go out and plunder the Visayas, telling the Joloans that they themselves only cared to seize Manila and the Acapulco galleon.

== See also ==
- Spanish–Moro conflict
