= Rafael María de Aguilar y Ponce de León =

56th Governor-General of the Philippines
- In office 1 September 1793 – 7 August 1806
- Monarch: Charles IV of Spain
- Governor: (Viceroy of New Spain); Juan Vicente de Güemes, 2nd Count of Revillagigedo; Miguel de la Grúa Talamanca, 1st Marquess of Branciforte; Miguel José de Azanza, 1st Duke of Santa Fe; Félix Berenguer de Marquina; José de Iturrigaray
- Preceded by: Félix Berenguer de Marquina
- Succeeded by: Mariano Fernández de Folgueras

Personal details
- Born: January 26, 1753 Écija, Kingdom of Spain
- Died: August 8, 1806 (aged 53) Manila, Captaincy General of the Philippines, Spanish Empire
- Awards: Order of Alcántara

Military service
- Allegiance: Spain
- Branch/service: Spanish Army
- Rank: Field Marshal

Rafael María de Aguilar y Ponce de León was a Spanish military officer who served as the 56th Governor-General of the Philippines (Spanish: Gobernador Géneral) and was the longest serving governor in the Spanish Philippines.

== Biography ==
There is not much known about the early life and career of Aguilar. Prior to his appointment as Governor-General of the Philippines, the first of only two gubernatorial appointments in the Philippines made by King Charles IV of Spain, he served as a military officer and a gentleman of the bedchamber. His military service earned him the Order of Alcántara. He arrived in the Philippines on 28 August 1793 and assumed office on 1 September. His administration was driven by the reforms initiated by the Enlightenment in Spain, which has become the distinguishing aspect of his long service as governor. Aguilar was the longest serving Spanish Governor-General of the Philippines (12 years, 11 months).

=== Administration of the Philippines ===
Detail of Balmis Expedition's routes in The Philippines

One of the key accomplishments of Aguilar's administration was setting up the defense of the archipelago. Fortifications were reinforced in Cavite. In 1794, a shipyard was constructed at Binondo in Manila and a naval base built at Corregidor. These were set up in order to make boats for military campaigns against the Moros. In 1796, two regiments of professional native troops were formed, the first time the native contingent of the colonial armed forces was professionalized. These regiments were named Granaderos de Luzon (Luzon Grenadiers) and Granaderos de Batangas (Batangas Grenadiers). In addition to this, five battalions of militia were organized. In 1800, the Naval Command was formed in order to check foreign vessels entering the archipelago. Six years later, a force of 300 marine grenadiers were organized.

Aguilar was able to effectively advocate the opening of Manila to foreign trade, a proposal that had been attempted by his predecessors, Félix Berenguer de Marquina (1788–1793) and José Basco y Vargas (1778–1787). However, it would only be by the royal decree of September 6, 1834 when the Sociedad Económica de los Amigos del País (Economic Societies of Friends of the Country) was abolished and Manila was completely opened to international trade. He was also able to reprint and disseminate former Governor-General José Antonio Raón y Gutiérrez's revised version of the "Ordinances of Good Government", a document first drafted by Pedro Manuel de Arandía Santisteban. Meanwhile, in 1804, he proposed the modernization of Manila. This had been done by massive public works projects, creation of cultural institutions, and the illumination of Manila streets. It was also during the administration of Aguilar that the Balmis Expedition (1803–1806) arrived in the Philippines. The expedition, led by Doctor Francisco Javier de Balmis, aimed to vaccinate people against smallpox, and the Philippines was included in the number of destinations of the mission. Aguilar died on 8 August 1806, one day after being succeeded by Mariano Fernández de Folgueras.

Preceded by Félix Berenguer de Marquina	Governor General of the Philippines; 1793–1806	Succeeded by Mariano Fernández de Folgueras
