= Mariano Fernández de Folgueras =

57th and 60th Governor and Captain-General of the Philippines
- In office August 7, 1806 – March 4, 1810
- Monarchs: Charles IV; Ferdinand VII; José I
- Governor: (Viceroy of New Spain); José de Iturrigaray; Pedro de Garibay; Francisco Javier de Lizana y Beaumont
- Preceded by: Rafael María de Aguilar y Ponce de León
- Succeeded by: Manuel Gonzalez de Aguilar
- In office December 10, 1816 – October 30, 1822
- Monarch: Ferdinand VII
- Governor: (Viceroy of New Spain); Juan Ruiz de Apodaca, 1st Count of Venadito; Francisco Novella Azabal Pérez y Sicardo; Juan O'Donojú
- Preceded by: José Gardoqui Jaraveitia
- Succeeded by: Juan Antonio Martínez

Personal details
- Born: Mariano Fernández de Folgueras y Fernández Flores; February 21, 1766 Galicia, Spain
- Died: June 2, 1823 (aged 57) Manila, Captaincy General of the Philippines

Mariano Fernández de Folgueras y Fernández Flores (1766 – June 2, 1823) was a Spanish military and colonial administrator who twice became the governor-general of the Philippines, from 1806 to 1810 and from 1816 to 1822. It was during his term when the people from Ilocandia revolted against Spain in 1807, the Napoleonic Spain was established in 1808 and the Viceroyalty of New Spain was dissolved in 1821.

== Biography ==
Fernández de Folgueras was born in Galicia, Spain in an unknown date and became a lieutenant of the king of Spain for the Philippines. When Rafael María de Aguilar y Ponce de León died in 1806, he succeeded as the acting governor-general of the islands. On September 16, 1807, he witnessed the Basi Revolt in Ilocos, which culminated twelve days later when the Spanish successfully quelled the rebels. In 1809, he gave permission to English traders to establish the first commercial houses in the Philippines.

He returned to the post when José Gardoqui Jaraveitia died in office and was named to succeed him. During his term, the pressure from the absolutist policy accentuated in the Philippines, and his actions of giving administrative posts to peninsulares and foreigners accumulated to several uprisings against foreigners residing in Manila.

On February 1, 1818, the captain Hipolito Bouchard arrived at Manila Bay. He sailed aboard a warship of the United Provinces of the Río de la Plata. Immediately blockade the Manila Bay, keeping the port closed for two months. Fernández de Folgueras left a detailed report of the events that occurred during the incursion of the South American forces. Folgueras, also, created the province of Ilocos Norte on February 2, 1818, and reestablished the Sociedad Económica de los Amigos del País on December 17, 1819. In 1820, the Escuela Nautica de Manila was established. From October 9 to 10, 1820, several foreigners were massacred by the natives because of Spanish authorities' claim that the natives spread the cholera in the islands. In 1821, Mexico became an independent nation as a conclusion to Mexican War of Independence; the viceroyalty was dissolved and the country was directly controlled by the Spanish Crown through the Ministry of the Colonies (Ministerio de Ultramar).

On October 30, 1822, Fernández de Folgueras gave the office to Juan Antonio Martínez and returned to become the lieutenant governor once again. On 1823, creoles and mestizos staged an insurrection against the government of Martínez because of the growing sentiments on how the Spanish authorities treated them. Led by Andrés Novales, this became known as the Novales Revolt. Fernández de Folgueras was killed on June 2, 1823, when the rebels occupied government buildings in Intramuros.

Political offices
Preceded by Rafael María de Aguilar y Ponce de León	Governor-General of the Philippines; 1806–1810	Succeeded by Manuel Gonzalez de Aguilar
Preceded by José Gardoqui Jaraveitia	Governor-General of the Philippines; 1816–1822	Succeeded by Juan Antonio Martínez
