= Governor-General of the Philippines =

Title of government executive in colonial Philippines

- Gobernador y Capitán General de Filipinas; Gobernador-Heneral ng Pilipinas フィリピン総督

- Residence: Fort San Pedro (1565–1572); Palacio del Gobernador (1572–1863); Malacañang Palace (1863–1945); Mansion House (1942–1945)
- Appointer: Viceroy of New Spain Monarch of Spain Monarch of Great Britain President of the United States Emperor of Japan
- Precursor: Various, the barangay system
- Formation: April 27, 1565
- First holder: Miguel López de Legazpi (under Spain); Dawsonne Drake (under Great Britain); Wesley Merritt (under the United States); Masaharu Homma (under the Empire of Japan)
- Final holder: Diego de los Ríos (under Spain); Dawsonne Drake (under Great Britain); Frank Murphy (under the United States); Tomoyuki Yamashita (under the Empire of Japan)
- Abolished: October 6, 1945

The governor-general of the Philippine (Note: Tagalog: Gobernador-Heneral ng Pilipinas; Spanish: Gobernador General de Filipinas; Japanese: フィリピン総督, romanized: Firipin sōtoku) was the chief executive of the colonial government in the Philippines under Spanish (1565–1898), American (1898–1946), British (1762–1764), and Japanese (1942–1945) rule. During the Spanish period, the office was formally known as the captain general of the Philippines (Spanish: Capitán General de Filipinas; Filipino: Kapitan Heneral ng Pilipinas). The governor-general also served as the representative of the executive authority of the ruling power.

On November 15, 1935, the Commonwealth of the Philippines was established as a transitional government to prepare the country for independence from American rule. The governor-general was replaced by an elected Filipino president of the Philippines, who assumed many of the duties of the office as chief executive of the Commonwealth. The last American governor-general subsequently became the high commissioner to the Philippines.

From 1565 to 1898, the Philippines was under Spanish rule. From 1565 to 1821, the governor and captain-general was appointed by the viceroy of New Spain and governed the Captaincy General of the Philippines on behalf of the monarch of Spain. During vacancies in the office, such as upon the death of an incumbent or during transitional periods between appointments, the Real Audiencia of Manila appointed a temporary governor from among its members.

Following the Mexican War of Independence in 1821, New Spain ceased to exist and the administrative affairs of the Philippines that had previously been handled through Mexico City were transferred directly to Madrid and placed under the authority of the Spanish Crown.

== Under New Spain (1565–1764) ==
No.	Portrait	Name	Tenure start	Tenure end	Viceroy of New Spain	Secretary of the Indies	Valido Secretary of the Universal Bureau First Secretary of State	Regent	Monarch
1		Miguel López de Legazpi (1502–1572)	April 27, 1565	August 20, 1572	Francisco Ceinos; Dean of the Audiencia (1564–1566)	Vacant (Overseas Affairs hold by the President of the Council of the Indies)	No valido	No regency	Philip II (1556–1598)
1		Miguel López de Legazpi (1502–1572)	April 27, 1565	August 20, 1572	Gastón de Peralta; 3rd Marquess of Falces (1566–1567)	Vacant (Overseas Affairs hold by the President of the Council of the Indies)	No valido	No regency	Philip II (1556–1598)
1		Miguel López de Legazpi (1502–1572)	April 27, 1565	August 20, 1572	Alonso Muñoz and Luis Carrillo (1567–1568)	Vacant (Overseas Affairs hold by the President of the Council of the Indies)	No valido	No regency	Philip II (1556–1598)
1		Miguel López de Legazpi (1502–1572)	April 27, 1565	August 20, 1572	Alonso Muñoz (1568)	Vacant (Overseas Affairs hold by the President of the Council of the Indies)	No valido	No regency	Philip II (1556–1598)
1		Miguel López de Legazpi (1502–1572)	April 27, 1565	August 20, 1572	Francisco Ceinos; Dean of the Audiencia (1564–1566)	Vacant (Overseas Affairs hold by the President of the Council of the Indies)	No valido	No regency	Philip II (1556–1598)
1		Miguel López de Legazpi (1502–1572)	April 27, 1565	August 20, 1572	Martín Enríquez de Almanza (1568–1580)	Vacant (Overseas Affairs hold by the President of the Council of the Indies)	No valido	No regency	Philip II (1556–1598)
2		Guido de Lavezaris (1512–1581)	August 20, 1572	August 25, 1575	Martín Enríquez de Almanza (1568–1580)	Vacant (Overseas Affairs hold by the President of the Council of the Indies)	No valido	No regency	Philip II (1556–1598)
3		Francisco de Sande (1540–1602)	August 25, 1575	April; 1580	Martín Enríquez de Almanza (1568–1580)	Vacant (Overseas Affairs hold by the President of the Council of the Indies)	No valido	No regency	Philip II (1556–1598)
4		Gonzalo Ronquillo de Peñalosa (died 1583)	April; 1580	March 10, 1583	Martín Enríquez de Almanza (1568–1580)	Vacant (Overseas Affairs hold by the President of the Council of the Indies)	No valido	No regency	Philip II (1556–1598)
4		Gonzalo Ronquillo de Peñalosa (died 1583)	April; 1580	March 10, 1583	Lorenzo Suárez de Mendoza; 5th Count of Coruña (1580–1583)	Vacant (Overseas Affairs hold by the President of the Council of the Indies)	No valido	No regency	Philip II (1556–1598)
5		Diego Ronquillo; Acting Governor-General	March 10, 1583	May 16, 1584	Lorenzo Suárez de Mendoza; 5th Count of Coruña (1580–1583)	Vacant (Overseas Affairs hold by the President of the Council of the Indies)	No valido	No regency	Philip II (1556–1598)
5		Diego Ronquillo; Acting Governor-General	March 10, 1583	May 16, 1584	Luis de Villanueva y Zapata; Dean of the Audiencia (1583–1584)	Vacant (Overseas Affairs hold by the President of the Council of the Indies)	No valido	No regency	Philip II (1556–1598)
6		Santiago de Vera (died 1606)	May 16, 1584	May; 1590	Luis de Villanueva y Zapata; Dean of the Audiencia (1583–1584)	Vacant (Overseas Affairs hold by the President of the Council of the Indies)	No valido	No regency	Philip II (1556–1598)
6		Santiago de Vera (died 1606)	May 16, 1584	May; 1590	Pedro Moya de Contreras; Archbishop of Mexico (1584–1585)	Vacant (Overseas Affairs hold by the President of the Council of the Indies)	No valido	No regency	Philip II (1556–1598)
6		Santiago de Vera (died 1606)	May 16, 1584	May; 1590	Álvaro Manrique de Zúñiga; 1st Marquess of Villamanrique (1585–1590)	Vacant (Overseas Affairs hold by the President of the Council of the Indies)	No valido	No regency	Philip II (1556–1598)
6		Santiago de Vera (died 1606)	May 16, 1584	May; 1590	Luis de Velasco; 1st Marquess of Salinas (1590–1595)	Vacant (Overseas Affairs hold by the President of the Council of the Indies)	No valido	No regency	Philip II (1556–1598)
7		Gómez Pérez Dasmariñas (1519–1593)	June 1, 1590	October 25, 1593	Luis de Velasco; 1st Marquess of Salinas (1590–1595)	Vacant (Overseas Affairs hold by the President of the Council of the Indies)	No valido	No regency	Philip II (1556–1598)
8		Pedro de Rojas; Acting Governor-General	October; 1593	December 3, 1593	Luis de Velasco; 1st Marquess of Salinas (1590–1595)	Vacant (Overseas Affairs hold by the President of the Council of the Indies)	No valido	No regency	Philip II (1556–1598)
9		Luis Pérez Dasmariñas (1567/1568–1603)	December 3, 1593	July 14, 1596	Luis de Velasco; 1st Marquess of Salinas (1590–1595)	Vacant (Overseas Affairs hold by the President of the Council of the Indies)	No valido	No regency	Philip II (1556–1598)
9		Luis Pérez Dasmariñas (1567/1568–1603)	December 3, 1593	July 14, 1596	Gaspar de Zúñiga; 5th Count of Monterrey (1595–1603)	Vacant (Overseas Affairs hold by the President of the Council of the Indies)	No valido	No regency	Philip II (1556–1598)
9		Luis Pérez Dasmariñas (1567/1568–1603)	December 3, 1593	July 14, 1596	Gaspar de Zúñiga; 5th Count of Monterrey (1595–1603)	Vacant (Overseas Affairs hold by the President of the Council of the Indies)	Duke of Lerma (1598–1618) (Note: As valido of the King of Spain)	No regency	Philip III (1598–1621)
10		Francisco de Tello de Guzmán (1532–1603)	July 14, 1596	May; 1602	Gaspar de Zúñiga; 5th Count of Monterrey (1595–1603)	Vacant (Overseas Affairs hold by the President of the Council of the Indies)	Duke of Lerma (1598–1618)	No regency	Philip III (1598–1621)
11		Pedro Bravo de Acuña (died 1606)	May; 1602	June 24, 1606	Gaspar de Zúñiga; 5th Count of Monterrey (1595–1603)	Vacant (Overseas Affairs hold by the President of the Council of the Indies)	Duke of Lerma (1598–1618)	No regency	Philip III (1598–1621)
11		Pedro Bravo de Acuña (died 1606)	May; 1602	June 24, 1606	Juan de Mendoza y Luna; 3rd Marquess of Montesclaros (1603–1607)	Vacant (Overseas Affairs hold by the President of the Council of the Indies)	Duke of Lerma (1598–1618)	No regency	Philip III (1598–1621)
12		Cristóbal Téllez Almazán; Real Audiencia (died 1612)	June 24, 1606	June 15, 1608	Juan de Mendoza y Luna; 3rd Marquess of Montesclaros (1603–1607)	Vacant (Overseas Affairs hold by the President of the Council of the Indies)	Duke of Lerma (1598–1618)	No regency	Philip III (1598–1621)
12		Cristóbal Téllez Almazán; Real Audiencia (died 1612)	June 24, 1606	June 15, 1608	Luis de Velasco; 1st Marquess of Salinas (1607–1611)	Vacant (Overseas Affairs hold by the President of the Council of the Indies)	Duke of Lerma (1598–1618)	No regency	Philip III (1598–1621)
13		Rodrigo de Vivero; Acting Governor-General (1564–1636)	June 15, 1608	April; 1609	Luis de Velasco; 1st Marquess of Salinas (1607–1611)	Vacant (Overseas Affairs hold by the President of the Council of the Indies)	Duke of Lerma (1598–1618)	No regency	Philip III (1598–1621)
14		Juan de Silva (died 1616)	April; 1609	April 19, 1616	Luis de Velasco; 1st Marquess of Salinas (1607–1611)	Vacant (Overseas Affairs hold by the President of the Council of the Indies)	Duke of Lerma (1598–1618)	No regency	Philip III (1598–1621)
14		Juan de Silva (died 1616)	April; 1609	April 19, 1616	García Guerra; Archbishop of Mexico (1611–1612)	Vacant (Overseas Affairs hold by the President of the Council of the Indies)	Duke of Lerma (1598–1618)	No regency	Philip III (1598–1621)
14		Juan de Silva (died 1616)	April; 1609	April 19, 1616	Pedro Otárola; Dean of the Audiencia (1612)	Vacant (Overseas Affairs hold by the President of the Council of the Indies)	Duke of Lerma (1598–1618)	No regency	Philip III (1598–1621)
14		Juan de Silva (died 1616)	April; 1609	April 19, 1616	Diego Fernández de Córdoba; 1st Marquess of Guadalcázar (1612–1621)	Vacant (Overseas Affairs hold by the President of the Council of the Indies)	Duke of Lerma (1598–1618)	No regency	Philip III (1598–1621)
15		Andrés de Alcaraz; Real Audiencia	April 19, 1616	July 3, 1618	Diego Fernández de Córdoba; 1st Marquess of Guadalcázar (1612–1621)	Vacant (Overseas Affairs hold by the President of the Council of the Indies)	Duke of Lerma (1598–1618)	No regency	Philip III (1598–1621)
16		Alonso Fajardo de Tenza (died 1624)	July 3, 1618	July; 1624	Diego Fernández de Córdoba; 1st Marquess of Guadalcázar (1612–1621)	Vacant (Overseas Affairs hold by the President of the Council of the Indies)	Duke of Lerma (1598–1618)	No regency	Philip III (1598–1621)
16		Alonso Fajardo de Tenza (died 1624)	July 3, 1618	July; 1624	Diego Fernández de Córdoba; 1st Marquess of Guadalcázar (1612–1621)	Vacant (Overseas Affairs hold by the President of the Council of the Indies)	Cristóbal Gómez de Sandoval (1618–1621)	No regency	Philip III (1598–1621)
16		Alonso Fajardo de Tenza (died 1624)	July 3, 1618	July; 1624	Paz de Valecillo; Dean of the Audiencia (1621)	Vacant (Overseas Affairs hold by the President of the Council of the Indies)	Cristóbal Gómez de Sandoval (1618–1621)	No regency	Philip III (1598–1621)
16		Alonso Fajardo de Tenza (died 1624)	July 3, 1618	July; 1624	Paz de Valecillo; Dean of the Audiencia (1621)	Vacant (Overseas Affairs hold by the President of the Council of the Indies)	Baltasar de Zúñiga (1621–1622)	No regency	Philip IV (1621–1665)
16		Alonso Fajardo de Tenza (died 1624)	July 3, 1618	July; 1624	Diego Carrillo de Mendoza; 1st Marquess of Gélves (1621–1624)	Vacant (Overseas Affairs hold by the President of the Council of the Indies)	Baltasar de Zúñiga (1621–1622)	No regency	Philip IV (1621–1665)
16		Alonso Fajardo de Tenza (died 1624)	July 3, 1618	July; 1624	Diego Carrillo de Mendoza; 1st Marquess of Gélves (1621–1624)	Vacant (Overseas Affairs hold by the President of the Council of the Indies)	Count-Duke of Olivares (1622–1644)	No regency	Philip IV (1621–1665)
17		Jeronimo de Silva; Real Audiencia	July; 1624	June; 1625	Diego Carrillo de Mendoza; 1st Marquess of Gélves (1621–1624)	Vacant (Overseas Affairs hold by the President of the Council of the Indies)	Count-Duke of Olivares (1622–1644)	No regency	Philip IV (1621–1665)
17		Jeronimo de Silva; Real Audiencia	July; 1624	June; 1625	Rodrigo Pacheco; 3rd Marquess of Cerralvo (1624–1635)	Vacant (Overseas Affairs hold by the President of the Council of the Indies)	Count-Duke of Olivares (1622–1644)	No regency	Philip IV (1621–1665)
18		Fernándo de Silva; Acting Governor-General	June; 1625	June 29, 1626	Rodrigo Pacheco; 3rd Marquess of Cerralvo (1624–1635)	Vacant (Overseas Affairs hold by the President of the Council of the Indies)	Count-Duke of Olivares (1622–1644)	No regency	Philip IV (1621–1665)
19		Juan Niño de Tabora (died 1632)	June 29, 1626	July 22, 1632	Rodrigo Pacheco; 3rd Marquess of Cerralvo (1624–1635)	Vacant (Overseas Affairs hold by the President of the Council of the Indies)	Count-Duke of Olivares (1622–1644)	No regency	Philip IV (1621–1665)
20		Lorenzo de Olaso; Real Audiencia	July 22, 1632	1633	Rodrigo Pacheco; 3rd Marquess of Cerralvo (1624–1635)	Vacant (Overseas Affairs hold by the President of the Council of the Indies)	Count-Duke of Olivares (1622–1644)	No regency	Philip IV (1621–1665)
21		Juan Cerezo de Salamanca; Acting Governor-General	August 29, 1633	June 25, 1635	Rodrigo Pacheco; 3rd Marquess of Cerralvo (1624–1635)	Vacant (Overseas Affairs hold by the President of the Council of the Indies)	Count-Duke of Olivares (1622–1644)	No regency	Philip IV (1621–1665)
22		Sebastián Hurtado de Corcuera (1587–1660)	June 25, 1635	August 11, 1644	Rodrigo Pacheco; 3rd Marquess of Cerralvo (1624–1635)	Vacant (Overseas Affairs hold by the President of the Council of the Indies)	Count-Duke of Olivares (1622–1644)	No regency	Philip IV (1621–1665)
22		Sebastián Hurtado de Corcuera (1587–1660)	June 25, 1635	August 11, 1644	Lope Díez de Armendáriz; 1st Marquess of Cadreita (1635–1640)	Vacant (Overseas Affairs hold by the President of the Council of the Indies)	Count-Duke of Olivares (1622–1644)	No regency	Philip IV (1621–1665)
22		Sebastián Hurtado de Corcuera (1587–1660)	June 25, 1635	August 11, 1644	Diego López Pacheco; 7th Duke of Escalona (1640–1642)	Vacant (Overseas Affairs hold by the President of the Council of the Indies)	Count-Duke of Olivares (1622–1644)	No regency	Philip IV (1621–1665)
22		Sebastián Hurtado de Corcuera (1587–1660)	June 25, 1635	August 11, 1644	Juan de Palafox y Mendoza; Bishop of Puebla (1642)	Vacant (Overseas Affairs hold by the President of the Council of the Indies)	Count-Duke of Olivares (1622–1644)	No regency	Philip IV (1621–1665)
22		Sebastián Hurtado de Corcuera (1587–1660)	June 25, 1635	August 11, 1644	García Sarmiento de Sotomayor; 2nd Count of Salvatierra (1642–1648)	Vacant (Overseas Affairs hold by the President of the Council of the Indies)	Count-Duke of Olivares (1622–1644)	No regency	Philip IV (1621–1665)
22		Sebastián Hurtado de Corcuera (1587–1660)	June 25, 1635	August 11, 1644	García Sarmiento de Sotomayor; 2nd Count of Salvatierra (1642–1648)	Vacant (Overseas Affairs hold by the President of the Council of the Indies)	Luis de Haro (1644–1661)	No regency	Philip IV (1621–1665)
23		Diego Fajardo Chacón	August 11, 1644	July 25, 1653	García Sarmiento de Sotomayor; 2nd Count of Salvatierra (1642–1648)	Vacant (Overseas Affairs hold by the President of the Council of the Indies)	Luis de Haro (1644–1661)	No regency	Philip IV (1621–1665)
23		Diego Fajardo Chacón	August 11, 1644	July 25, 1653	Marcos de Torres y Rueda; Bishop of Yucatan (1648–1649)	Vacant (Overseas Affairs hold by the President of the Council of the Indies)	Luis de Haro (1644–1661)	No regency	Philip IV (1621–1665)
23		Diego Fajardo Chacón	August 11, 1644	July 25, 1653	Matías de Peralta; Dean of the Audiencia (1649–1650)	Vacant (Overseas Affairs hold by the President of the Council of the Indies)	Luis de Haro (1644–1661)	No regency	Philip IV (1621–1665)
23		Diego Fajardo Chacón	August 11, 1644	July 25, 1653	Luis Enríquez de Guzmán; 9th Count of Alba de Liste (1650–1653)	Vacant (Overseas Affairs hold by the President of the Council of the Indies)	Luis de Haro (1644–1661)	No regency	Philip IV (1621–1665)
24		Sabiniano Manrique de Lara (1606–1679)	July 25, 1653	September 8, 1663	Luis Enríquez de Guzmán; 9th Count of Alba de Liste (1650–1653)	Vacant (Overseas Affairs hold by the President of the Council of the Indies)	Luis de Haro (1644–1661)	No regency	Philip IV (1621–1665)
24		Sabiniano Manrique de Lara (1606–1679)	July 25, 1653	September 8, 1663	Francisco Fernández de la Cueva; 8th Duke of Alburquerque (1653–1660)	Vacant (Overseas Affairs hold by the President of the Council of the Indies)	Luis de Haro (1644–1661)	No regency	Philip IV (1621–1665)
24		Sabiniano Manrique de Lara (1606–1679)	July 25, 1653	September 8, 1663	Juan Francisco Leiva y de la Cerda; 5th Marquess of Adrada (1660–1664)	Vacant (Overseas Affairs hold by the President of the Council of the Indies)	Luis de Haro (1644–1661)	No regency	Philip IV (1621–1665)
24		Sabiniano Manrique de Lara (1606–1679)	July 25, 1653	September 8, 1663	Juan Francisco Leiva y de la Cerda; 5th Marquess of Adrada (1660–1664)	Vacant (Overseas Affairs hold by the President of the Council of the Indies)	No valido (1661–1665) (Note: Personalist government of Philip IV)	No regency	Philip IV (1621–1665)
25		Diego de Salcedo	September 8, 1663	September 28, 1668	Juan Francisco Leiva y de la Cerda; 5th Marquess of Adrada (1660–1664)	Vacant (Overseas Affairs hold by the President of the Council of the Indies)	No valido (1661–1665)	No regency	Philip IV (1621–1665)
25		Diego de Salcedo	September 8, 1663	September 28, 1668	Diego Osorio de Escobar y Llamas; Bishop of Puebla (1664)	Vacant (Overseas Affairs hold by the President of the Council of the Indies)	No valido (1661–1665)	No regency	Philip IV (1621–1665)
25		Diego de Salcedo	September 8, 1663	September 28, 1668	Antonio Sebastián Álvarez de Toledo; 2nd Marquess of Mancera (1664–1673)	Vacant (Overseas Affairs hold by the President of the Council of the Indies)	No valido (1661–1665)	No regency	Philip IV (1621–1665)
25		Diego de Salcedo	September 8, 1663	September 28, 1668	Antonio Sebastián Álvarez de Toledo; 2nd Marquess of Mancera (1664–1673)	Vacant (Overseas Affairs hold by the President of the Council of the Indies)	Juan Everardo Nithard (1665–1669)	Mariana of Austria (1665–1675) (Note: As regent during the minority of his son, Charles II)	Charles II (1665–1700)
26		Juan Manuel de la Peña Bonifaz; Acting Governor-General (died 1669)	September 28, 1668	September 24, 1669	Antonio Sebastián Álvarez de Toledo; 2nd Marquess of Mancera (1664–1673)	Vacant (Overseas Affairs hold by the President of the Council of the Indies)	Juan Everardo Nithard (1665–1669)	Mariana of Austria (1665–1675)	Charles II (1665–1700)
26		Juan Manuel de la Peña Bonifaz; Acting Governor-General (died 1669)	September 28, 1668	September 24, 1669	Antonio Sebastián Álvarez de Toledo; 2nd Marquess of Mancera (1664–1673)	Vacant (Overseas Affairs hold by the President of the Council of the Indies)	Fernando de Valenzuela (1666–1677)	Mariana of Austria (1665–1675)	Charles II (1665–1700)
27		Manuel de León	September 24, 1669	September 21, 1677	Antonio Sebastián Álvarez de Toledo; 2nd Marquess of Mancera (1664–1673)	Vacant (Overseas Affairs hold by the President of the Council of the Indies)	Fernando de Valenzuela (1666–1677)	Mariana of Austria (1665–1675)	Charles II (1665–1700)
27		Manuel de León	September 24, 1669	September 21, 1677	Payo Enríquez de Rivera; Bishop of Puebla and Archbishop of Mexico (1673–1680)	Vacant (Overseas Affairs hold by the President of the Council of the Indies)	Fernando de Valenzuela (1666–1677)	Mariana of Austria (1665–1675)	Charles II (1665–1700)
27		Manuel de León	September 24, 1669	September 21, 1677	Payo Enríquez de Rivera; Bishop of Puebla and Archbishop of Mexico (1673–1680)	Vacant (Overseas Affairs hold by the President of the Council of the Indies)	Fernando de Valenzuela (1666–1677)	No regency	Charles II (1665–1700)
27		Manuel de León	September 24, 1669	September 21, 1677	Payo Enríquez de Rivera; Bishop of Puebla and Archbishop of Mexico (1673–1680)	Vacant (Overseas Affairs hold by the President of the Council of the Indies)	John Joseph of Austria (1677–1679) (Note: As Chief Minister of Spain)	No regency	Charles II (1665–1700)
28		Francisco Coloma y Maceda; Real Audiencia (1617–1677)	April 11, 1677	September 25, 1677	Payo Enríquez de Rivera; Bishop of Puebla and Archbishop of Mexico (1673–1680)	Vacant (Overseas Affairs hold by the President of the Council of the Indies)	John Joseph of Austria (1677–1679)	No regency	Charles II (1665–1700)
29		Francisco de Montemayor y Mansilla; Real Audiencia	September 21, 1677	September 28, 1678	Payo Enríquez de Rivera; Bishop of Puebla and Archbishop of Mexico (1673–1680)	Vacant (Overseas Affairs hold by the President of the Council of the Indies)	John Joseph of Austria (1677–1679)	No regency	Charles II (1665–1700)
30		Juan de Vargas Hurtado	September 28, 1678	August 24, 1684	Payo Enríquez de Rivera; Bishop of Puebla and Archbishop of Mexico (1673–1680)	Vacant (Overseas Affairs hold by the President of the Council of the Indies)	John Joseph of Austria (1677–1679)	No regency	Charles II (1665–1700)
30		Juan de Vargas Hurtado	September 28, 1678	August 24, 1684	Payo Enríquez de Rivera; Bishop of Puebla and Archbishop of Mexico (1673–1680)	Vacant (Overseas Affairs hold by the President of the Council of the Indies)	Duke of Medinaceli (1679–1685)	No regency	Charles II (1665–1700)
30		Juan de Vargas Hurtado	September 28, 1678	August 24, 1684	Tomás de la Cerda; 3rd Marquess of la Laguna de Camero Viejo (1680–1686)	Vacant (Overseas Affairs hold by the President of the Council of the Indies)	Duke of Medinaceli (1679–1685)	No regency	Charles II (1665–1700)
31		Gabriel de Curucealegui y Arriola	August 24, 1684	April; 1689	Tomás de la Cerda; 3rd Marquess of la Laguna de Camero Viejo (1680–1686)	Vacant (Overseas Affairs hold by the President of the Council of the Indies)	Duke of Medinaceli (1679–1685)	No regency	Charles II (1665–1700)
31		Gabriel de Curucealegui y Arriola	August 24, 1684	April; 1689	Tomás de la Cerda; 3rd Marquess of la Laguna de Camero Viejo (1680–1686)	Vacant (Overseas Affairs hold by the President of the Council of the Indies)	Count of Oropesa (1685–1691)	No regency	Charles II (1665–1700)
31		Gabriel de Curucealegui y Arriola	August 24, 1684	April; 1689	Melchor Portocarrero; 3rd Count of Monclova (1686–1688)	Vacant (Overseas Affairs hold by the President of the Council of the Indies)	Count of Oropesa (1685–1691)	No regency	Charles II (1665–1700)
31		Gabriel de Curucealegui y Arriola	August 24, 1684	April; 1689	Gaspar de la Cerda; 8th Count of Galve (1688–1696)	Vacant (Overseas Affairs hold by the President of the Council of the Indies)	Count of Oropesa (1685–1691)	No regency	Charles II (1665–1700)
32		Alonso de Abella Fuertes; Real Audiencia	April; 1689	July; 1690	Gaspar de la Cerda; 8th Count of Galve (1688–1696)	Vacant (Overseas Affairs hold by the President of the Council of the Indies)	Count of Oropesa (1685–1691)	No regency	Charles II (1665–1700)
33		Fausto Cruzat y Góngora (died 1702)	July 25, 1690	December 8, 1701	Gaspar de la Cerda; 8th Count of Galve (1688–1696)	Vacant (Overseas Affairs hold by the President of the Council of the Indies)	Count of Oropesa (1685–1691)	No regency	Charles II (1665–1700)
33		Fausto Cruzat y Góngora (died 1702)	July 25, 1690	December 8, 1701	Gaspar de la Cerda; 8th Count of Galve (1688–1696)	Vacant (Overseas Affairs hold by the President of the Council of the Indies)	No valido (1691–1698) (Note: After the dimission of Count of Oropesa, there wasn't any powerful person)	No regency	Charles II (1665–1700)
33		Fausto Cruzat y Góngora (died 1702)	July 25, 1690	December 8, 1701	Juan Ortega y Montañés; Bishop of Durango, Bishop of Guatemala, Bishop of Michoacán and Archbishop of Mexico (1696)	Vacant (Overseas Affairs hold by the President of the Council of the Indies)	No valido (1691–1698)	No regency	Charles II (1665–1700)
33		Fausto Cruzat y Góngora (died 1702)	July 25, 1690	December 8, 1701	José Sarmiento de Valladares; 1st Duke of Atrisco (1696–1701)	Vacant (Overseas Affairs hold by the President of the Council of the Indies)	No valido (1691–1698)	No regency	Charles II (1665–1700)
33		Fausto Cruzat y Góngora (died 1702)	July 25, 1690	December 8, 1701	José Sarmiento de Valladares; 1st Duke of Atrisco (1696–1701)	Vacant (Overseas Affairs hold by the President of the Council of the Indies)	Count of Oropesa (1691–1699)	No regency	Charles II (1665–1700)
33		Fausto Cruzat y Góngora (died 1702)	July 25, 1690	December 8, 1701	José Sarmiento de Valladares; 1st Duke of Atrisco (1696–1701)	Vacant (Overseas Affairs hold by the President of the Council of the Indies)	Cardinal Portocarrero (1699–1700)	No regency	Charles II (1665–1700)
33		Fausto Cruzat y Góngora (died 1702)	July 25, 1690	December 8, 1701	José Sarmiento de Valladares; 1st Duke of Atrisco (1696–1701)	Vacant (Overseas Affairs hold by the President of the Council of the Indies)	Cardinal Portocarrero (1699–1700)	Cardinal Portocarrero (1700) (Note: During the illness of Charles II)	Charles II (1665–1700)
33		Fausto Cruzat y Góngora (died 1702)	July 25, 1690	December 8, 1701	José Sarmiento de Valladares; 1st Duke of Atrisco (1696–1701)	Vacant (Overseas Affairs hold by the President of the Council of the Indies)	Cardinal Portocarrero (1699–1700)	Government Board of the Realms (1700–1701) (Note: After the death of Charles II)	Vacant (Note: Until the coronation of Philip of Anjou)
33		Fausto Cruzat y Góngora (died 1702)	July 25, 1690	December 8, 1701	José Sarmiento de Valladares; 1st Duke of Atrisco (1696–1701)	Vacant (Overseas Affairs hold by the President of the Council of the Indies)	Antonio de Ubilla (1700–1704) (Note: As Secretary of the Universal Bureau)	Government Board of the Realms (1700–1701)	Philip V (1700–1724)
33		Fausto Cruzat y Góngora (died 1702)	July 25, 1690	December 8, 1701	José Sarmiento de Valladares; 1st Duke of Atrisco (1696–1701)	Vacant (Overseas Affairs hold by the President of the Council of the Indies)	Antonio de Ubilla (1700–1704)	No regency	Philip V (1700–1724)
33		Fausto Cruzat y Góngora (died 1702)	July 25, 1690	December 8, 1701	José Sarmiento de Valladares; 1st Duke of Atrisco (1696–1701)	Vacant (Overseas Affairs hold by the President of the Council of the Indies)	Antonio de Ubilla (1700–1704)	Cardinal Portocarrero (1701–1703) (Note: During the voyage of Philip V)	Philip V (1700–1724)
34		Domingo Zabálburu de Echevarri	December 8, 1701	August 25, 1709	Juan Ortega y Montañés; Archbishop of Mexico (1701–1702)	Vacant (Overseas Affairs hold by the President of the Council of the Indies)	Antonio de Ubilla (1700–1704)	Cardinal Portocarrero (1701–1703)	Philip V (1700–1724)
34		Domingo Zabálburu de Echevarri	December 8, 1701	August 25, 1709	Francisco Fernández de la Cueva; 1st Duke of Alburquerque (1702–1710)	Vacant (Overseas Affairs hold by the President of the Council of the Indies)	Antonio de Ubilla (1700–1704)	Cardinal Portocarrero (1701–1703)	Philip V (1700–1724)
34		Domingo Zabálburu de Echevarri	December 8, 1701	August 25, 1709	Francisco Fernández de la Cueva; 1st Duke of Alburquerque (1702–1710)	Vacant (Overseas Affairs hold by the President of the Council of the Indies)	Antonio de Ubilla (1700–1704)	No regency	Philip V (1700–1724)
34		Domingo Zabálburu de Echevarri	December 8, 1701	August 25, 1709	Francisco Fernández de la Cueva; 1st Duke of Alburquerque (1702–1710)	Vacant (Overseas Affairs hold by the President of the Council of the Indies)	Marquis of Mejorada del Campo (1704–1714)	No regency	Philip V (1700–1724)
35		Martín de Ursúa' y Arismendi; 1st Count of Lizárraga (1653–1715)	August 25, 1709	February 4, 1715	Francisco Fernández de la Cueva; 1st Duke of Alburquerque (1702–1710)	Vacant (Overseas Affairs hold by the President of the Council of the Indies)	Marquis of Mejorada del Campo (1704–1714)	No regency	Philip V (1700–1724)
35		Martín de Ursúa' y Arismendi; 1st Count of Lizárraga (1653–1715)	August 25, 1709	February 4, 1715	Fernando de Alencastre; 1st Duke of Linares (1710–1716)	Vacant (Overseas Affairs hold by the President of the Council of the Indies)	Marquis of Mejorada del Campo (1704–1714)	No regency	Philip V (1700–1724)
35		Martín de Ursúa' y Arismendi; 1st Count of Lizárraga (1653–1715)	August 25, 1709	February 4, 1715	Fernando de Alencastre; 1st Duke of Linares (1710–1716)	Vacant (Overseas Affairs hold by the President of the Council of the Indies)	Manuel Vadillo y Velasco (1714)	No regency	Philip V (1700–1724)
35		Martín de Ursúa' y Arismendi; 1st Count of Lizárraga (1653–1715)	August 25, 1709	February 4, 1715	Fernando de Alencastre; 1st Duke of Linares (1710–1716)	Vacant (Overseas Affairs hold by the President of the Council of the Indies)	José de Grimaldo (1714–1724)	No regency	Philip V (1700–1724)
35		Martín de Ursúa' y Arismendi; 1st Count of Lizárraga (1653–1715)	August 25, 1709	February 4, 1715	Fernando de Alencastre; 1st Duke of Linares (1710–1716)	Bernardo Tinajero de la Escalera (1714–1715) (Note: As Secretary of State for the Navy and the Indies of Spain)	José de Grimaldo (1714–1724)	No regency	Philip V (1700–1724)
36		José Torralba; Real Audiencia (1653–1726)	February 4, 1715	August 9, 1717	Fernando de Alencastre; 1st Duke of Linares (1710–1716)	Bernardo Tinajero de la Escalera (1714–1715)	José de Grimaldo (1714–1724)	No regency	Philip V (1700–1724)
36		José Torralba; Real Audiencia (1653–1726)	February 4, 1715	August 9, 1717	Fernando de Alencastre; 1st Duke of Linares (1710–1716)	No secretary (1715–1720)	José de Grimaldo (1714–1724)	No regency	Philip V (1700–1724)
36		José Torralba; Real Audiencia (1653–1726)	February 4, 1715	August 9, 1717	Baltasar de Zúñiga; 1st Duke of Arión (1716–1722)	No secretary (1715–1720)	José de Grimaldo (1714–1724)	No regency	Philip V (1700–1724)
37		Fernando Manuel de Bustillo Bustamante y Rueda (died 1719)	August 9, 1717	October 11, 1719	Baltasar de Zúñiga; 1st Duke of Arión (1716–1722)	No secretary (1715–1720)	José de Grimaldo (1714–1724)	No regency	Philip V (1700–1724)
38		Francisco de la Cuesta; Archbishop of Manila; Acting Governor-General (1661–1724)	October 11, 1719	August 6, 1721	Baltasar de Zúñiga; 1st Duke of Arión (1716–1722)	No secretary (1715–1720)	José de Grimaldo (1714–1724)	No regency	Philip V (1700–1724)
38		Francisco de la Cuesta; Archbishop of Manila; Acting Governor-General (1661–1724)	October 11, 1719	August 6, 1721	Baltasar de Zúñiga; 1st Duke of Arión (1716–1722)	Miguel Fernández Durán (1720–1721)	José de Grimaldo (1714–1724)	No regency	Philip V (1700–1724)
38		Francisco de la Cuesta; Archbishop of Manila; Acting Governor-General (1661–1724)	October 11, 1719	August 6, 1721	Baltasar de Zúñiga; 1st Duke of Arión (1716–1722)	Andres Matías de Pes Marzaraga (1721–1723)	José de Grimaldo (1714–1724)	No regency	Philip V (1700–1724)
39		Toribio de Cossío	August 6, 1721	August 14, 1729	Baltasar de Zúñiga; 1st Duke of Arión (1716–1722)	Andres Matías de Pes Marzaraga (1721–1723)	José de Grimaldo (1714–1724)	No regency	Philip V (1700–1724)
39		Toribio de Cossío	August 6, 1721	August 14, 1729	Juan de Acuña; 1st Marquess of Casa Fuerte (1722–1734)	Andres Matías de Pes Marzaraga (1721–1723)	José de Grimaldo (1714–1724)	No regency	Philip V (1700–1724)
39		Toribio de Cossío	August 6, 1721	August 14, 1729	Juan de Acuña; 1st Marquess of Casa Fuerte (1722–1734)	No secretary (1723–1724)	José de Grimaldo (1714–1724)	No regency	Philip V (1700–1724)
39		Toribio de Cossío	August 6, 1721	August 14, 1729	Juan de Acuña; 1st Marquess of Casa Fuerte (1722–1734)	Antonio de Sopeña y Mioño (1724–1726)	José de Grimaldo (1714–1724)	No regency	Philip V (1700–1724)
39		Toribio de Cossío	August 6, 1721	August 14, 1729	Juan de Acuña; 1st Marquess of Casa Fuerte (1722–1734)	Antonio de Sopeña y Mioño (1724–1726)	Juan Bautista de Orendáin (1724)	No regency	Philip V (1700–1724)
39		Toribio de Cossío	August 6, 1721	August 14, 1729	Juan de Acuña; 1st Marquess of Casa Fuerte (1722–1734)	Antonio de Sopeña y Mioño (1724–1726)	Juan Bautista de Orendáin (1724)	No regency	Louis I (1724)
39		Toribio de Cossío	August 6, 1721	August 14, 1729	Juan de Acuña; 1st Marquess of Casa Fuerte (1722–1734)	Antonio de Sopeña y Mioño (1724–1726)	Juan Bautista de Orendáin (1724)	No regency	Philip V (1724–1746)
39		Toribio de Cossío	August 6, 1721	August 14, 1729	Juan de Acuña; 1st Marquess of Casa Fuerte (1722–1734)	Antonio de Sopeña y Mioño (1724–1726)	José de Grimaldo (1724–1725)	No regency	Philip V (1724–1746)
39		Toribio de Cossío	August 6, 1721	August 14, 1729	Juan de Acuña; 1st Marquess of Casa Fuerte (1722–1734)	Antonio de Sopeña y Mioño (1724–1726)	Baron Ripperda (1725–1726)	No regency	Philip V (1724–1746)
39		Toribio de Cossío	August 6, 1721	August 14, 1729	Juan de Acuña; 1st Marquess of Casa Fuerte (1722–1734)	Antonio de Sopeña y Mioño (1724–1726)	José de Grimaldo (1726)	No regency	Philip V (1724–1746)
39		Toribio de Cossío	August 6, 1721	August 14, 1729	Juan de Acuña; 1st Marquess of Casa Fuerte (1722–1734)	José de Patiño y Rosales (1726–1736)	José de Grimaldo (1726)	No regency	Philip V (1724–1746)
39		Toribio de Cossío	August 6, 1721	August 14, 1729	Juan de Acuña; 1st Marquess of Casa Fuerte (1722–1734)	José de Patiño y Rosales (1726–1736)	Juan Bautista de Orendáin(1726–1734)	No regency	Philip V (1724–1746)
40		Fernándo Valdés Tamón	August 14, 1729	July; 1739	Juan de Acuña; 1st Marquess of Casa Fuerte (1722–1734)	José de Patiño y Rosales (1726–1736)	Juan Bautista de Orendáin(1726–1734)	No regency	Philip V (1724–1746)
40		Fernándo Valdés Tamón	August 14, 1729	July; 1739	Juan Antonio de Vizarrón y Eguiarreta; Archbishop of Mexico (1734–1740)	José de Patiño y Rosales (1726–1736)	Juan Bautista de Orendáin(1726–1734)	No regency	Philip V (1724–1746)
40		Fernándo Valdés Tamón	August 14, 1729	July; 1739	Juan Antonio de Vizarrón y Eguiarreta; Archbishop of Mexico (1734–1740)	José de Patiño y Rosales (1726–1736)	José de Patiño y Rosales (1734–1736) (Note: As First Secretary of State of Spain)	No regency	Philip V (1724–1746)
40		Fernándo Valdés Tamón	August 14, 1729	July; 1739	Juan Antonio de Vizarrón y Eguiarreta; Archbishop of Mexico (1734–1740)	José de Patiño y Rosales (1726–1736)	Marquis of Villarías (1736–1746)	No regency	Philip V (1724–1746)
40		Fernándo Valdés Tamón	August 14, 1729	July; 1739	Juan Antonio de Vizarrón y Eguiarreta; Archbishop of Mexico (1734–1740)	Mateo Pablo Díaz de Lavandero (1736–1739)	Marquis of Villarías (1736–1746)	No regency	Philip V (1724–1746)
41		Gaspar de la Torre y Ayala (died 1745)	July; 1739	September 21, 1745	Juan Antonio de Vizarrón y Eguiarreta; Archbishop of Mexico (1734–1740)	Mateo Pablo Díaz de Lavandero (1736–1739)	Marquis of Villarías (1736–1746)	No regency	Philip V (1724–1746)
41		Gaspar de la Torre y Ayala (died 1745)	July; 1739	September 21, 1745	Juan Antonio de Vizarrón y Eguiarreta; Archbishop of Mexico (1734–1740)	Marquis of Villarías (1739–1743)	Marquis of Villarías (1736–1746)	No regency	Philip V (1724–1746)
41		Gaspar de la Torre y Ayala (died 1745)	July; 1739	September 21, 1745	Pedro de Castro; 1st Duke of la Conquista (1740–1741)	Marquis of Villarías (1739–1743)	Marquis of Villarías (1736–1746)	No regency	Philip V (1724–1746)
41		Gaspar de la Torre y Ayala (died 1745)	July; 1739	September 21, 1745	Pedro Malo de Villavicencio; President of the Audiencia (1741–1742)	Marquis of Villarías (1739–1743)	Marquis of Villarías (1736–1746)	No regency	Philip V (1724–1746)
41		Gaspar de la Torre y Ayala (died 1745)	July; 1739	September 21, 1745	Pedro Cebrián; 5th Count of Fuenclara (1742–1746)	Marquis of Villarías (1739–1743)	Marquis of Villarías (1736–1746)	No regency	Philip V (1724–1746)
42		Juan de Arechederra; Bishop-elect of Nueva Segovia; Acting Governor-General (1681–1751)	September 21, 1745	July 20, 1750	Pedro Cebrián; 5th Count of Fuenclara (1742–1746)	Marquis of Villarías (1739–1743)	Marquis of Villarías (1736–1746)	No regency	Philip V (1724–1746)
42		Juan de Arechederra; Bishop-elect of Nueva Segovia; Acting Governor-General (1681–1751)	September 21, 1745	July 20, 1750	Pedro Cebrián; 5th Count of Fuenclara (1742–1746)	Marquess of Ensenada (1743–1754)	Marquis of Villarías (1736–1746)	No regency	Philip V (1724–1746)
42		Juan de Arechederra; Bishop-elect of Nueva Segovia; Acting Governor-General (1681–1751)	September 21, 1745	July 20, 1750	Juan Francisco de Güemes y Horcasitas; 1st Count of Revillagigedo (1746–1755)	Marquess of Ensenada (1743–1754)	Marquis of Villarías (1736–1746)	No regency	Ferdinand VI (1746–1759)
42		Juan de Arechederra; Bishop-elect of Nueva Segovia; Acting Governor-General (1681–1751)	September 21, 1745	July 20, 1750	Juan Francisco de Güemes y Horcasitas; 1st Count of Revillagigedo (1746–1755)	Marquess of Ensenada (1743–1754)	José de Carvajal (1746–1754)	No regency	Ferdinand VI (1746–1759)
43		Francisco José de Ovando; 1st Marquess of Brindisi (1693–1755)	July 20, 1750	July 26, 1754	Juan Francisco de Güemes y Horcasitas; 1st Count of Revillagigedo (1746–1755)	Marquess of Ensenada (1743–1754)	José de Carvajal (1746–1754)	No regency	Ferdinand VI (1746–1759)
43		Francisco José de Ovando; 1st Marquess of Brindisi (1693–1755)	July 20, 1750	July 26, 1754	Juan Francisco de Güemes y Horcasitas; 1st Count of Revillagigedo (1746–1755)	Marquess of Ensenada (1743–1754)	Duke of Huéscar (1754); Interim	No regency	Ferdinand VI (1746–1759)
43		Francisco José de Ovando; 1st Marquess of Brindisi (1693–1755)	July 20, 1750	July 26, 1754	Juan Francisco de Güemes y Horcasitas; 1st Count of Revillagigedo (1746–1755)	Marquess of Ensenada (1743–1754)	Ricardo Wall (1754–1763)	No regency	Ferdinand VI (1746–1759)
43		Francisco José de Ovando; 1st Marquess of Brindisi (1693–1755)	July 20, 1750	July 26, 1754	Juan Francisco de Güemes y Horcasitas; 1st Count of Revillagigedo (1746–1755)	Ricardo Wall (1754); Interim (Note: As Secretary of State for Indies)	Ricardo Wall (1754–1763)	No regency	Ferdinand VI (1746–1759)
43		Francisco José de Ovando; 1st Marquess of Brindisi (1693–1755)	July 20, 1750	July 26, 1754	Juan Francisco de Güemes y Horcasitas; 1st Count of Revillagigedo (1746–1755)	Julián de Arriaga y Ribera (1754–1776)	Ricardo Wall (1754–1763)	No regency	Ferdinand VI (1746–1759)
44		Pedro Manuel de Arandía Santisteban (1699–1759)	July 26, 1754	May 31, 1759	Juan Francisco de Güemes y Horcasitas; 1st Count of Revillagigedo (1746–1755)	Julián de Arriaga y Ribera (1754–1776)	Ricardo Wall (1754–1763)	No regency	Ferdinand VI (1746–1759)
44		Pedro Manuel de Arandía Santisteban (1699–1759)	July 26, 1754	May 31, 1759	Agustín de Ahumada; 2nd Marquess of Amarillas (1755–1760)	Julián de Arriaga y Ribera (1754–1776)	Ricardo Wall (1754–1763)	No regency	Ferdinand VI (1746–1759)
45		Miguel Lino de Ezpeleta; Bishop of Cebu; Acting Governor-General (1701–1771)	June; 1759	May 31, 1761	Agustín de Ahumada; 2nd Marquess of Amarillas (1755–1760)	Julián de Arriaga y Ribera (1754–1776)	Ricardo Wall (1754–1763)	No regency	Ferdinand VI (1746–1759)
45		Miguel Lino de Ezpeleta; Bishop of Cebu; Acting Governor-General (1701–1771)	June; 1759	May 31, 1761	Agustín de Ahumada; 2nd Marquess of Amarillas (1755–1760)	Julián de Arriaga y Ribera (1754–1776)	Ricardo Wall (1754–1763)	Elisabeth Farnese (1759) (Note: Until the arrival of Charles III)	Charles III (1759–1788)
45		Miguel Lino de Ezpeleta; Bishop of Cebu; Acting Governor-General (1701–1771)	June; 1759	May 31, 1761	Agustín de Ahumada; 2nd Marquess of Amarillas (1755–1760)	Julián de Arriaga y Ribera (1754–1776)	Ricardo Wall (1754–1763)	No regency	Charles III (1759–1788)
45		Miguel Lino de Ezpeleta; Bishop of Cebu; Acting Governor-General (1701–1771)	June; 1759	May 31, 1761	Francisco Antonio de Echávarri; Dean of the Audiencia (1760)	Julián de Arriaga y Ribera (1754–1776)	Ricardo Wall (1754–1763)	No regency	Charles III (1759–1788)
45		Miguel Lino de Ezpeleta; Bishop of Cebu; Acting Governor-General (1701–1771)	June; 1759	May 31, 1761	Francisco Cajigal de la Vega (1760)	Julián de Arriaga y Ribera (1754–1776)	Ricardo Wall (1754–1763)	No regency	Charles III (1759–1788)
45		Miguel Lino de Ezpeleta; Bishop of Cebu; Acting Governor-General (1701–1771)	June; 1759	May 31, 1761	Joaquín de Montserrat; 1st Marquess of Cruillas (1760–1766)	Julián de Arriaga y Ribera (1754–1776)	Ricardo Wall (1754–1763)	No regency	Charles III (1759–1788)
46		Manuel Rojo del Río y Vieyra; Archbishop of Manila; Acting Governor-General (1708–1764)	July; 1761	October 6, 1762	Joaquín de Montserrat; 1st Marquess of Cruillas (1760–1766)	Julián de Arriaga y Ribera (1754–1776)	Ricardo Wall (1754–1763)	No regency	Charles III (1759–1788)

== British occupation of Manila (1762–1764) ==
After the Spanish defeat at the Battle of Manila in 1762, the Philippines was briefly governed simultaneously by two Governors-General, one of the Spanish Empire and one of the British Empire.

Great Britain shortly occupied Manila and the naval port of Cavite as part of the Seven Years' War, while the Spanish Governor-General set up a provisional government in Bacolor, Pampanga to continue administering the rest of the archipelago.

=== British governor-general ===
No.	Portrait	Name	Tenure start	Tenure end	Secretary of State for the Southern Department	Prime Minister	Monarch
46a		Dawsonne Drake (1724–1784)	November 2, 1762	May 31, 1764	The Earl of Egremont (1761–1763)	The Earl of Bute (1762–1763)	George III (1760–1820)
46a		Dawsonne Drake (1724–1784)	November 2, 1762	May 31, 1764	The Earl of Egremont (1761–1763)	George Grenville (1763–1765)	George III (1760–1820)
46a		Dawsonne Drake (1724–1784)	November 2, 1762	May 31, 1764	The Earl of Halifax (1763–1765)	George Grenville (1763–1765)	George III (1760–1820)

=== Spanish governor-general ===
No.	Portrait	Name	Tenure start	Tenure end	Viceroy of New Spain	Secretary of State for Indies	First Secretary of State	Monarch
47		Simón de Anda y Salazar (1709–1776)	October 6, 1762	February 10, 1764	Joaquín de Montserrat; 1st Marquess of Cruillas (1760–1766)	Julián Arriaga y Ribera (1754–1776)	Ricardo Wall (1754–1763)	Charles III (1759–1788)
47		Simón de Anda y Salazar (1709–1776)	October 6, 1762	February 10, 1764	Joaquín de Montserrat; 1st Marquess of Cruillas (1760–1766)	Julián Arriaga y Ribera (1754–1776)	Jerónimo Grimaldi (1763–1777)	Charles III (1759–1788)

== Under New Spain (1764–1821) ==
After the British returned Manila to the Spanish in 1764, the Spanish Governor-General Francisco Javier de la Torre resumed administration of the Philippines under the authority of the Viceroy of New Spain in modern-day Mexico (New Spain) as part of the Spanish Empire.

The Philippines, along with the rest of the Spanish Empire, became part of the First French Empire in 1808 after Napoleon overthrew Ferdinand VII and installed Joseph Bonaparte as king until his abdication in 1813, as part of a disastrous consequence of Napoleon's 1812 Russian campaign, the Peninsular Wars, particularly the Battle of Vitoria, and of forming the Sixth Coalition.

No.	Portrait	Name	Tenure start	Tenure end	Viceroy of New Spain	Secretary of the Indies	First Secretary of State	Monarch
48		Francisco Javier de la Torre; Acting Governor-General	March 17, 1764	July 6, 1765	Joaquín de Montserrat; 1st Marquess of Cruillas (1760–1766)	Julián Arriaga y Ribera (1754–1776)	Jerónimo Grimaldi (1763–1777)	Charles III (1759–1788)
49		José Antonio Raón y Gutiérrez (1700–1773)	July 6, 1765	July; 1770	Joaquín de Montserrat; 1st Marquess of Cruillas (1760–1766)	Julián Arriaga y Ribera (1754–1776)	Jerónimo Grimaldi (1763–1777)	Charles III (1759–1788)
49		José Antonio Raón y Gutiérrez (1700–1773)	July 6, 1765	July; 1770	Carlos Francisco de Croix; 1st Marquess of Croix (1766–1771)	Julián Arriaga y Ribera (1754–1776)	Jerónimo Grimaldi (1763–1777)	Charles III (1759–1788)
(47)		Simón de Anda y Salazar (1709–1776)	July; 1770	October 30, 1776	Carlos Francisco de Croix; 1st Marquess of Croix (1766–1771)	Julián Arriaga y Ribera (1754–1776)	Jerónimo Grimaldi (1763–1777)	Charles III (1759–1788)
(47)		Simón de Anda y Salazar (1709–1776)	July; 1770	October 30, 1776	Antonio María de Bucareli (1771–1779)	Julián Arriaga y Ribera (1754–1776)	Jerónimo Grimaldi (1763–1777)	Charles III (1759–1788)
(47)		Simón de Anda y Salazar (1709–1776)	July; 1770	October 30, 1776	Antonio María de Bucareli (1771–1779)	Marquess of Sonora (1776–1787)	Jerónimo Grimaldi (1763–1777)	Charles III (1759–1788)
50		Pedro Sarrió; Acting Governor-General	October 30, 1776	July; 1778	Antonio María de Bucareli (1771–1779)	Marquess of Sonora (1776–1787)	Jerónimo Grimaldi (1763–1777)	Charles III (1759–1788)
50		Pedro Sarrió; Acting Governor-General	October 30, 1776	July; 1778	Antonio María de Bucareli (1771–1779)	Marquess of Sonora (1776–1787)	Count of Floridablanca (1777–1792)	Charles III (1759–1788)
51		José Basco y Vargas (1733–1805)	July; 1778	September 22, 1787	Antonio María de Bucareli (1771–1779)	Marquess of Sonora (1776–1787)	Count of Floridablanca (1777–1792)	Charles III (1759–1788)
51		José Basco y Vargas (1733–1805)	July; 1778	September 22, 1787	Francisco Romá y Rosell; Regent of the Audiencia (1779)	Marquess of Sonora (1776–1787)	Count of Floridablanca (1777–1792)	Charles III (1759–1788)
51		José Basco y Vargas (1733–1805)	July; 1778	September 22, 1787	Martín de Mayorga; Captain General of Guatemala (1779–1783)	Marquess of Sonora (1776–1787)	Count of Floridablanca (1777–1792)	Charles III (1759–1788)
51		José Basco y Vargas (1733–1805)	July; 1778	September 22, 1787	Matías de Gálvez y Gallardo; Captain General of Guatemala (1783–1784)	Marquess of Sonora (1776–1787)	Count of Floridablanca (1777–1792)	Charles III (1759–1788)
		José Basco y Vargas (1733–1805)	July; 1778	September 22, 1787	Vicente de Herrera y Rivero; Regent of the Audiencia (1784–1785)	Marquess of Sonora (1776–1787)	Count of Floridablanca (1777–1792)	Charles III (1759–1788)
		José Basco y Vargas (1733–1805)	July; 1778	September 22, 1787	Bernardo de Gálvez; 1st Count of Gálvez (1785–1786)	Marquess of Sonora (1776–1787)	Count of Floridablanca (1777–1792)	Charles III (1759–1788)
		José Basco y Vargas (1733–1805)	July; 1778	September 22, 1787	Eusebio Sánchez Pareja; Regent of the Audiencia (1786–1787)	Marquess of Sonora (1776–1787)	Count of Floridablanca (1777–1792)	Charles III (1759–1788)
		José Basco y Vargas (1733–1805)	July; 1778	September 22, 1787	Alonso Núñez de Haro y Peralta; Archbishop of Mexico (1787)	Marquess of Sonora (1776–1787)	Count of Floridablanca (1777–1792)	Charles III (1759–1788)
		José Basco y Vargas (1733–1805)	July; 1778	September 22, 1787	Alonso Núñez de Haro y Peralta; Archbishop of Mexico (1787)	Count of Floridablanca (1787); Interim	Count of Floridablanca (1777–1792)	Charles III (1759–1788)
		José Basco y Vargas (1733–1805)	July; 1778	September 22, 1787	Alonso Núñez de Haro y Peralta; Archbishop of Mexico (1787)	Antonio Porlier (Note: As Secretary of State for Grace and Justice of Indies) Antonio Valdés y Fernández Bazán (1787–1790) (Note: As Secretary of State for War, Treasury, Commerce and Navigation of Indies)	Count of Floridablanca (1777–1792)	Charles III (1759–1788)
		José Basco y Vargas (1733–1805)	July; 1778	September 22, 1787	Manuel Antonio Flórez (1787–1789)	Antonio Porlier Antonio Valdés y Fernández Bazán (1787–1790)	Count of Floridablanca (1777–1792)	Charles III (1759–1788)
(50)		Pedro Sarrió; Acting Governor-General	September 22, 1787	July 1, 1788	Manuel Antonio Flórez (1787–1789)	Antonio Porlier Antonio Valdés y Fernández Bazán (1787–1790)	Count of Floridablanca (1777–1792)	Charles III (1759–1788)
51		Félix Berenguer de Marquina (1733–1826)	July 1, 1788	September 1, 1793	Manuel Antonio Flórez (1787–1789)	Antonio Porlier Antonio Valdés y Fernández Bazán (1787–1790)	Count of Floridablanca (1777–1792)	Charles III (1759–1788)
51		Félix Berenguer de Marquina (1733–1826)	July 1, 1788	September 1, 1793	Manuel Antonio Flórez (1787–1789)	Antonio Porlier Antonio Valdés y Fernández Bazán (1787–1790)	Count of Floridablanca (1777–1792)	Charles IV (1788–1808)
51		Félix Berenguer de Marquina (1733–1826)	July 1, 1788	September 1, 1793	Juan Vicente de Güemes; 2nd Count of Revillagigedo (1789–1794)	Antonio Porlier Antonio Valdés y Fernández Bazán (1787–1790)	Count of Floridablanca (1777–1792)	Charles IV (1788–1808)
51		Félix Berenguer de Marquina (1733–1826)	July 1, 1788	September 1, 1793	Juan Vicente de Güemes; 2nd Count of Revillagigedo (1789–1794)	No secretary (affairs of Indies distributed among different secretariats)	Count of Floridablanca (1777–1792)	Charles IV (1788–1808)
51		Félix Berenguer de Marquina (1733–1826)	July 1, 1788	September 1, 1793	Juan Vicente de Güemes; 2nd Count of Revillagigedo (1789–1794)	No secretary (affairs of Indies distributed among different secretariats)	Count of Aranda (1792); Interim	Charles IV (1788–1808)
51		Félix Berenguer de Marquina (1733–1826)	July 1, 1788	September 1, 1793	Juan Vicente de Güemes; 2nd Count of Revillagigedo (1789–1794)	No secretary (affairs of Indies distributed among different secretariats)	Manuel Godoy (1792–1798)	Charles IV (1788–1808)
52		Rafael María de Aguilar y Ponce de León (1737–1806)	September 1, 1793	August 7, 1806	Juan Vicente de Güemes; 2nd Count of Revillagigedo (1789–1794)	No secretary (affairs of Indies distributed among different secretariats)	Manuel Godoy (1792–1798)	Charles IV (1788–1808)
52		Rafael María de Aguilar y Ponce de León (1737–1806)	September 1, 1793	August 7, 1806	Miguel de la Grúa Talamanca; 1st Marquess of Branciforte (1794–1798)	No secretary (affairs of Indies distributed among different secretariats)	Manuel Godoy (1792–1798)	Charles IV (1788–1808)
52		Rafael María de Aguilar y Ponce de León (1737–1806)	September 1, 1793	August 7, 1806	Miguel de la Grúa Talamanca; 1st Marquess of Branciforte (1794–1798)	No secretary (affairs of Indies distributed among different secretariats)	Francisco de Saavedra (1798–1799)	Charles IV (1788–1808)
52		Rafael María de Aguilar y Ponce de León (1737–1806)	September 1, 1793	August 7, 1806	Miguel José de Azanza; 1st Duke of Santa Fe (1798–1800)	No secretary (affairs of Indies distributed among different secretariats)	Francisco de Saavedra (1798–1799)	Charles IV (1788–1808)
52		Rafael María de Aguilar y Ponce de León (1737–1806)	September 1, 1793	August 7, 1806	Miguel José de Azanza; 1st Duke of Santa Fe (1798–1800)	No secretary (affairs of Indies distributed among different secretariats)	Mariano Luis de Urquijo (1799–1800)	Charles IV (1788–1808)
52		Rafael María de Aguilar y Ponce de León (1737–1806)	September 1, 1793	August 7, 1806	Félix Berenguer de Marquina (1800–1803)	No secretary (affairs of Indies distributed among different secretariats)	Mariano Luis de Urquijo (1799–1800)	Charles IV (1788–1808)
52		Rafael María de Aguilar y Ponce de León (1737–1806)	September 1, 1793	August 7, 1806	Félix Berenguer de Marquina (1800–1803)	No secretary (affairs of Indies distributed among different secretariats)	Pedro Cevallos Guerra (1800–1808)	Charles IV (1788–1808)
52		Rafael María de Aguilar y Ponce de León (1737–1806)	September 1, 1793	August 7, 1806	José de Iturrigaray (1803–1808)	No secretary (affairs of Indies distributed among different secretariats)	Pedro Cevallos Guerra (1800–1808)	Charles IV (1788–1808)
53		Mariano Fernández de Folgueras; Acting Governor-General (1766–1823)	August 7, 1806	March 4, 1810	José de Iturrigaray (1803–1808)	No secretary (affairs of Indies distributed among different secretariats)	Pedro Cevallos Guerra (1800–1808)	Charles IV (1788–1808)
53		Mariano Fernández de Folgueras; Acting Governor-General (1766–1823)	August 7, 1806	March 4, 1810	José de Iturrigaray (1803–1808)	No secretary (affairs of Indies distributed among different secretariats)	Gonzalo O'Farril (1808)	Charles IV (1788–1808)
53		Mariano Fernández de Folgueras; Acting Governor-General (1766–1823)	August 7, 1806	March 4, 1810	José de Iturrigaray (1803–1808)	No secretary (affairs of Indies distributed among different secretariats)	Pedro Cevallos Guerra (1808)	Ferdinand VII (1808)
53		Mariano Fernández de Folgueras; Acting Governor-General (1766–1823)	August 7, 1806	March 4, 1810	José de Iturrigaray (1803–1808)	Miguel José de Azanza; 1st Duke of Santa Fe (1808–1813) (Note: As Minister of the Indies of Spain)	Mariano Luis de Urquijo (1808–1813)	Joseph Bonaparte (1808–1813)
53		Mariano Fernández de Folgueras; Acting Governor-General (1766–1823)	August 7, 1806	March 4, 1810	Pedro de Garibay (1808–1809) (Note: Loyal to Ferdinand VII during the Spanish War of Independence)	Miguel José de Azanza; 1st Duke of Santa Fe (1808–1813)	Mariano Luis de Urquijo (1808–1813)	Joseph Bonaparte (1808–1813)
53		Mariano Fernández de Folgueras; Acting Governor-General (1766–1823)	August 7, 1806	March 4, 1810	Francisco Javier de Lizana y Beaumont; Archbishop of Mexico (1809–1810)	Miguel José de Azanza; 1st Duke of Santa Fe (1808–1813)	Mariano Luis de Urquijo (1808–1813)	Joseph Bonaparte (1808–1813)
54		Manuel González de Aguilar	March 4, 1810	September 4, 1813	Francisco Javier de Lizana y Beaumont; Archbishop of Mexico (1809–1810)	Miguel José de Azanza; 1st Duke of Santa Fe (1808–1813)	Mariano Luis de Urquijo (1808–1813)	Joseph Bonaparte (1808–1813)
54		Manuel González de Aguilar	March 4, 1810	September 4, 1813	Pedro Catani (1810)	Miguel José de Azanza; 1st Duke of Santa Fe (1808–1813)	Mariano Luis de Urquijo (1808–1813)	Joseph Bonaparte (1808–1813)
54		Manuel González de Aguilar	March 4, 1810	September 4, 1813	Francisco Javier Venegas; 1st Marquess of Reunión and New Spain (1810–1813)	Miguel José de Azanza; 1st Duke of Santa Fe (1808–1813)	Mariano Luis de Urquijo (1808–1813)	Joseph Bonaparte (1808–1813)
54		Manuel González de Aguilar	March 4, 1810	September 4, 1813	Félix María Calleja del Rey; 1st Count of Calderón (1813–1816)	Miguel José de Azanza; 1st Duke of Santa Fe (1808–1813)	Mariano Luis de Urquijo (1808–1813)	Joseph Bonaparte (1808–1813)
54		Manuel González de Aguilar	March 4, 1810	September 4, 1813	Félix María Calleja del Rey; 1st Count of Calderón (1813–1816)	No secretary	Juan O'Donojú (Interim; 1813)	Joseph Bonaparte (1808–1813)
55		José de Gardoqui y Jarabeitia	September 4, 1813	December 10, 1816	Félix María Calleja del Rey; 1st Count of Calderón (1813–1816)	No secretary	Juan O'Donojú (Interim; 1813)	Joseph Bonaparte (1808–1813)
55		José de Gardoqui y Jarabeitia	September 4, 1813	December 10, 1816	Félix María Calleja del Rey; 1st Count of Calderón (1813–1816)	No secretary	Fernando de Laserna (1813); Interim	Joseph Bonaparte (1808–1813)
55		José de Gardoqui y Jarabeitia	September 4, 1813	December 10, 1816	Félix María Calleja del Rey; 1st Count of Calderón (1813–1816)	Manuel Antonio de la Bodega y Mollinedo (1813–1814) (Note: As Secretary of State for Overseas Governance)	José Luyando (1813–1814); Interim	Ferdinand VII (1813–1833)
55		José de Gardoqui y Jarabeitia	September 4, 1813	December 10, 1816	Félix María Calleja del Rey; 1st Count of Calderón (1813–1816)	Miguel de Lardizabal (1814–1815)	José Miguel de Carvajal-Vargas (1814)	Ferdinand VII (1813–1833)
55		José de Gardoqui y Jarabeitia	September 4, 1813	December 10, 1816	Félix María Calleja del Rey; 1st Count of Calderón (1813–1816)	No secretary	Pedro Cevallos Guerra (1814–1816)	Ferdinand VII (1813–1833)
55		José de Gardoqui y Jarabeitia	September 4, 1813	December 10, 1816	Félix María Calleja del Rey; 1st Count of Calderón (1813–1816)	No secretary	Jaun Estebán Lozano de Torres (1816)	Ferdinand VII (1813–1833)
55		José de Gardoqui y Jarabeitia	September 4, 1813	December 10, 1816	Félix María Calleja del Rey; 1st Count of Calderón (1813–1816)	No secretary	Pedro Cevallos Guerra (1816)	Ferdinand VII (1813–1833)
55		José de Gardoqui y Jarabeitia	September 4, 1813	December 10, 1816	Juan Ruiz de Apodaca; 1st Count of Venadito (1816–1821)	No secretary	Pedro Cevallos Guerra (1816)	Ferdinand VII (1813–1833)
55		José de Gardoqui y Jarabeitia	September 4, 1813	December 10, 1816	Juan Ruiz de Apodaca; 1st Count of Venadito (1816–1821)	No secretary	José García de León (1816–1818)	Ferdinand VII (1813–1833)
(53)		Mariano Fernández de Folgueras; Acting Governor-General (1766–1823)	December 10, 1816	September 15, 1821	Juan Ruiz de Apodaca; 1st Count of Venadito (1816–1821)	No secretary	José García de León (1816–1818)	Ferdinand VII (1813–1833)
(53)		Mariano Fernández de Folgueras; Acting Governor-General (1766–1823)	December 10, 1816	September 15, 1821	Juan Ruiz de Apodaca; 1st Count of Venadito (1816–1821)	No secretary	Carlos Martínez de Irujo, 1st Marquis of Casa Irujo (1818–1819); Interim	Ferdinand VII (1813–1833)
(53)		Mariano Fernández de Folgueras; Acting Governor-General (1766–1823)	December 10, 1816	September 15, 1821	Juan Ruiz de Apodaca; 1st Count of Venadito (1816–1821)	No secretary	Manuel González Salmón (1819); Interim	Ferdinand VII (1813–1833)
(53)		Mariano Fernández de Folgueras; Acting Governor-General (1766–1823)	December 10, 1816	September 15, 1821	Juan Ruiz de Apodaca; 1st Count of Venadito (1816–1821)	No secretary	Joaquín José Melgarejo (1819–1820)	Ferdinand VII (1813–1833)
(53)		Mariano Fernández de Folgueras; Acting Governor-General (1766–1823)	December 10, 1816	September 15, 1821	Juan Ruiz de Apodaca; 1st Count of Venadito (1816–1821)	Antonio González Salmón (1820); Interim	Joaquín José Melgarejo (1819–1820)	Ferdinand VII (1813–1833)
(53)		Mariano Fernández de Folgueras; Acting Governor-General (1766–1823)	December 10, 1816	September 15, 1821	Juan Ruiz de Apodaca; 1st Count of Venadito (1816–1821)	Antonio González Salmón (1820); Interim	Juan Jabat Aztal (1820) Interim	Ferdinand VII (1813–1833)
(53)		Mariano Fernández de Folgueras; Acting Governor-General (1766–1823)	December 10, 1816	September 15, 1821	Juan Ruiz de Apodaca; 1st Count of Venadito (1816–1821)	Antonio Porcel Román (1820)	Juan Jabat Aztal (1820) Interim	Ferdinand VII (1813–1833)
(53)		Mariano Fernández de Folgueras; Acting Governor-General (1766–1823)	December 10, 1816	September 15, 1821	Juan Ruiz de Apodaca; 1st Count of Venadito (1816–1821)	Antonio Porcel Román (1820)	Evaristo Pérez de Castro (1820–1821)	Ferdinand VII (1813–1833)
(53)		Mariano Fernández de Folgueras; Acting Governor-General (1766–1823)	December 10, 1816	September 15, 1821	Juan Ruiz de Apodaca; 1st Count of Venadito (1816–1821)	Ramón Gil de la Cuadra (1820–1821)	Evaristo Pérez de Castro (1820–1821)	Ferdinand VII (1813–1833)
(53)		Mariano Fernández de Folgueras; Acting Governor-General (1766–1823)	December 10, 1816	September 15, 1821	Juan Ruiz de Apodaca; 1st Count of Venadito (1816–1821)	Antonio de Guilleman (1821); Interim	Joaquín Anduaga Cuenca (1821); Interim	Ferdinand VII (1813–1833)
(53)		Mariano Fernández de Folgueras; Acting Governor-General (1766–1823)	December 10, 1816	September 15, 1821	Juan Ruiz de Apodaca; 1st Count of Venadito (1816–1821)	Antonio de Guilleman (1821); Interim	Francisco de Paula Escudero (1821); Interim	Ferdinand VII (1813–1833)
(53)		Mariano Fernández de Folgueras; Acting Governor-General (1766–1823)	December 10, 1816	September 15, 1821	Juan Ruiz de Apodaca; 1st Count of Venadito (1816–1821)	Ramón Olaguer Feliú (1821)	Francisco de Paula Escudero (1821); Interim	Ferdinand VII (1813–1833)
(53)		Mariano Fernández de Folgueras; Acting Governor-General (1766–1823)	December 10, 1816	September 15, 1821	Juan Ruiz de Apodaca; 1st Count of Venadito (1816–1821)	Ramón Olaguer Feliú (1821)	Eusebio Bardají y Azara (1821–1822)	Ferdinand VII (1813–1833)
(53)		Mariano Fernández de Folgueras; Acting Governor-General (1766–1823)	December 10, 1816	September 15, 1821	Juan Ruiz de Apodaca; 1st Count of Venadito (1816–1821)	Ramón López Pelegrín (1821–1822)	Eusebio Bardají y Azara (1821–1822)	Ferdinand VII (1813–1833)
(53)		Mariano Fernández de Folgueras; Acting Governor-General (1766–1823)	December 10, 1816	September 15, 1821	Francisco Novella Azabal Pérez y Sicardo (1821)	Ramón López Pelegrín (1821–1822)	Eusebio Bardají y Azara (1821–1822)	Ferdinand VII (1813–1833)
(53)		Mariano Fernández de Folgueras; Acting Governor-General (1766–1823)	December 10, 1816	September 15, 1821	Juan O'Donojú (1821)	Ramón López Pelegrín (1821–1822)	Eusebio Bardají y Azara (1821–1822)	Ferdinand VII (1813–1833)

== Direct Spanish control (1821–1899) ==
After the 1821 Mexican War of Independence, Mexico became independent and was no longer part of the Spanish Empire. The Viceroyalty of New Spain ceased to exist. The Philippines, as a result, was directly governed from Madrid, under the Spanish Crown.

No.	Portrait	Name	Tenure start	Tenure end	Minister of Overseas (Note: Depending ministry of the Spanish colonies)	First Secretary of State Prime Minister	Regent	Monarch
(53)		Mariano Fernández de Folgueras Acting Governor-General (1766–1823)	September 16, 1821	October 30, 1822	Ramón López-Pelegrín (1821–1822)	Eusebio Bardají y Azara (1821–1822)	No regency	Ferdinand VII (1813–1833)
(53)		Mariano Fernández de Folgueras Acting Governor-General (1766–1823)	September 16, 1821	October 30, 1822	Ramón López-Pelegrín (1821–1822)	Ramón López-Pelegrín (1822); Interim	No regency	Ferdinand VII (1813–1833)
(53)		Mariano Fernández de Folgueras Acting Governor-General (1766–1823)	September 16, 1821	October 30, 1822	Ramón López-Pelegrín (1821–1822)	José Gabriel de Silva-Bazán (1822); Interim	No regency	Ferdinand VII (1813–1833)
(53)		Mariano Fernández de Folgueras Acting Governor-General (1766–1823)	September 16, 1821	October 30, 1822	Ramón López-Pelegrín (1821–1822)	Ramón López-Pelegrín (1822); Interim	No regency	Ferdinand VII (1813–1833)
(53)		Mariano Fernández de Folgueras Acting Governor-General (1766–1823)	September 16, 1821	October 30, 1822	Manuel de la Bodega Mollinedo (1822)	Francisco Martínez de la Rosa (1822)	No regency	Ferdinand VII (1813–1833)
(53)		Mariano Fernández de Folgueras Acting Governor-General (1766–1823)	September 16, 1821	October 30, 1822	Diego Clemencín (1822)	Francisco Martínez de la Rosa (1822)	No regency	Ferdinand VII (1813–1833)
(53)		Mariano Fernández de Folgueras Acting Governor-General (1766–1823)	September 16, 1821	October 30, 1822	José Manuel de Vadillo (1822–1823)	Evaristo Fernández de San Miguel (1822–1823)	No regency	Ferdinand VII (1813–1833)
54		Juan Antonio Martínez	October 30, 1822	October 14, 1825	José Manuel de Vadillo (1822–1823)	José Manuel de Vadillo (1823); Interim	No regency	Ferdinand VII (1813–1833)
54		Juan Antonio Martínez	October 30, 1822	October 14, 1825	Pedro Urquinaona (1823)	Santiago Usoz y Mozi (1823); Interim	No regency	Ferdinand VII (1813–1833)
54		Juan Antonio Martínez	October 30, 1822	October 14, 1825	Pedro Urquinaona (1823)	José María Pando de la Riva (1823)	No regency	Ferdinand VII (1813–1833)
54		Juan Antonio Martínez	October 30, 1822	October 14, 1825	Francisco de Paula Ossorio y Vargas (1823) Interim	José María Pando de la Riva (1823)	No regency	Ferdinand VII (1813–1833)
54		Juan Antonio Martínez	October 30, 1822	October 14, 1825	Francisco de Paula Ossorio y Vargas (1823) Interim	Luis María de Salazar y Salazar (1823); Interim	No regency	Ferdinand VII (1813–1833)
54		Juan Antonio Martínez	October 30, 1822	October 14, 1825	Francisco de Paula Ossorio y Vargas (1823) Interim	Juan Antonio Yandiola Garay (1823); Interim	No regency	Ferdinand VII (1813–1833)
54		Juan Antonio Martínez	October 30, 1822	October 14, 1825	Francisco de Paula Ossorio y Vargas (1823) Interim	José Luyando (1823)	No regency	Ferdinand VII (1813–1833)
54		Juan Antonio Martínez	October 30, 1822	October 14, 1825	Francisco de Paula Ossorio y Vargas (1823) Interim	Víctor Damián Sáez (1823)	No regency	Ferdinand VII (1813–1833)
54		Juan Antonio Martínez	October 30, 1822	October 14, 1825	No minister	Víctor Damián Sáez (1823)	No regency	Ferdinand VII (1813–1833)
54		Juan Antonio Martínez	October 30, 1822	October 14, 1825	No minister	Carlos Martínez de Irujo, 1st Marquis of Casa Irujo (1823)	No regency	Ferdinand VII (1813–1833)
54		Juan Antonio Martínez	October 30, 1822	October 14, 1825	No minister	Narciso Heredia (1823–1824)	No regency	Ferdinand VII (1813–1833)
54		Juan Antonio Martínez	October 30, 1822	October 14, 1825	No minister	Francisco Cea Bermúdez (1824–1825)	No regency	Ferdinand VII (1813–1833)
55		Mariano Ricafort Palacín y Abarca (1776–1846)	October 14, 1825	December 23, 1830	No minister	Francisco Cea Bermúdez (1824–1825)	No regency	Ferdinand VII (1813–1833)
55		Mariano Ricafort Palacín y Abarca (1776–1846)	October 14, 1825	December 23, 1830	No minister	Pedro de Alcántara Álvarez de Toledo (1825–1826)	No regency	Ferdinand VII (1813–1833)
55		Mariano Ricafort Palacín y Abarca (1776–1846)	October 14, 1825	December 23, 1830	No minister	Manuel González Salmón (1826–1832)	No regency	Ferdinand VII (1813–1833)
56		Pasqual Enrile y Alcedo (1772–1836)	December 23, 1830	March 1, 1835	No minister	Manuel González Salmón (1826–1832)	No regency	Ferdinand VII (1813–1833)
56		Pasqual Enrile y Alcedo (1772–1836)	December 23, 1830	March 1, 1835	No minister	Antonio de Saavedra y Jofré (1832); Interim	No regency	Ferdinand VII (1813–1833)
56		Pasqual Enrile y Alcedo (1772–1836)	December 23, 1830	March 1, 1835	No minister	Francisco Cea Bermúdez (1832–1834)	No regency	Ferdinand VII (1813–1833)
56		Pasqual Enrile y Alcedo (1772–1836)	December 23, 1830	March 1, 1835	No minister	Francisco Cea Bermúdez (1832–1834)	Maria Christina of the Two Sicilies(1833–1840)	Isabella II (1833–1868)u
56		Pasqual Enrile y Alcedo (1772–1836)	December 23, 1830	March 1, 1835	No minister	Francisco Martínez de la Rosa (1834–1835) (Note: As President of the Minsterial Council of Spain)	Maria Christina of the Two Sicilies(1833–1840)	Isabella II (1833–1868)u
57		Gabriel de Torres	March 1, 1835	April 23, 1835	No minister	Francisco Martínez de la Rosa (1834–1835)	Maria Christina of the Two Sicilies(1833–1840)	Isabella II (1833–1868)u
58		Joaquín de Crame Acting Governor-General	April 23, 1835	September 9, 1835	No minister	Francisco Martínez de la Rosa (1834–1835)	Maria Christina of the Two Sicilies(1833–1840)	Isabella II (1833–1868)u
58		Joaquín de Crame Acting Governor-General	April 23, 1835	September 9, 1835	No minister	José María Quiepo de Llano (1835)	Maria Christina of the Two Sicilies(1833–1840)	Isabella II (1833–1868)u
59		Pedro Antonio Salazar y Salazar Acting Governor-General (1782–1861)	September 9, 1835	August 27, 1837	No minister	José María Quiepo de Llano (1835)	Maria Christina of the Two Sicilies(1833–1840)	Isabella II (1833–1868)u
59		Pedro Antonio Salazar y Salazar Acting Governor-General (1782–1861)	September 9, 1835	August 27, 1837	No minister	Miguel Ricardo de Álava (1835)	Maria Christina of the Two Sicilies(1833–1840)	Isabella II (1833–1868)u
59		Pedro Antonio Salazar y Salazar Acting Governor-General (1782–1861)	September 9, 1835	August 27, 1837	No minister	Juan Álvarez Mendizábal (1835–1836); Interim	Maria Christina of the Two Sicilies(1833–1840)	Isabella II (1833–1868)u
59		Pedro Antonio Salazar y Salazar Acting Governor-General (1782–1861)	September 9, 1835	August 27, 1837	No minister	Francisco Javier de Istúriz (1836)	Maria Christina of the Two Sicilies(1833–1840)	Isabella II (1833–1868)u
59		Pedro Antonio Salazar y Salazar Acting Governor-General (1782–1861)	September 9, 1835	August 27, 1837	No minister	José María Calatrava (1836–1837)	Maria Christina of the Two Sicilies(1833–1840)	Isabella II (1833–1868)u
59		Pedro Antonio Salazar y Salazar Acting Governor-General (1782–1861)	September 9, 1835	August 27, 1837	Depending on the Minister of the Navy	José María Calatrava (1836–1837)	Maria Christina of the Two Sicilies(1833–1840)	Isabella II (1833–1868)u
60		Andrés García Camba (1793–1861)	August 27, 1837	December 29, 1838	Depending on the Minister of the Navy	Baldomero Espartero (1837)	Maria Christina of the Two Sicilies(1833–1840)	Isabella II (1833–1868)u
60		Andrés García Camba (1793–1861)	August 27, 1837	December 29, 1838	Depending on the Minister of the Navy	Eusebio Bardají y Azara (1837)	Maria Christina of the Two Sicilies(1833–1840)	Isabella II (1833–1868)u
60		Andrés García Camba (1793–1861)	August 27, 1837	December 29, 1838	Depending on the Minister of the Navy	Narciso Heredia (1837–1838)	Maria Christina of the Two Sicilies(1833–1840)	Isabella II (1833–1868)u
60		Andrés García Camba (1793–1861)	August 27, 1837	December 29, 1838	Depending on the Minister of the Navy	Bernardino Fernández de Velasco (1838)	Maria Christina of the Two Sicilies(1833–1840)	Isabella II (1833–1868)u
60		Andrés García Camba (1793–1861)	August 27, 1837	December 29, 1838	Depending on the Minister of the Navy	Evaristo Pérez de Castro (1838–1840)	Maria Christina of the Two Sicilies(1833–1840)	Isabella II (1833–1868)u
61		Luis Lardizábal	December 29, 1838	February 14, 1841	Depending on the Minister of the Navy	Evaristo Pérez de Castro (1838–1840)	Maria Christina of the Two Sicilies(1833–1840)	Isabella II (1833–1868)u
61		Luis Lardizábal	December 29, 1838	February 14, 1841	Depending on the Minister of the Navy	Antonio González (1840)	Maria Christina of the Two Sicilies(1833–1840)	Isabella II (1833–1868)u
61		Luis Lardizábal	December 29, 1838	February 14, 1841	Depending on the Minister of the Navy	Valentín Ferraz (1840)	Maria Christina of the Two Sicilies(1833–1840)	Isabella II (1833–1868)u
61		Luis Lardizábal	December 29, 1838	February 14, 1841	Depending on the Minister of the Navy	Modesto Cortázar (1840); Interim	Maria Christina of the Two Sicilies(1833–1840)	Isabella II (1833–1868)u
61		Luis Lardizábal	December 29, 1838	February 14, 1841	Depending on the Minister of the Navy	Baldomero Espartero (1840–1841)	Maria Christina of the Two Sicilies(1833–1840)	Isabella II (1833–1868)u
61		Luis Lardizábal	December 29, 1838	February 14, 1841	Depending on the Minister of the Navy	Baldomero Espartero (1840–1841)	Baldomero Espartero (1840–1843)	Isabella II (1833–1868)u
62		Marcelino de Oraá Lecumberri (1788–1851)	February 14, 1841	June 17, 1843	Depending on the Minister of the Navy	Baldomero Espartero (1840–1841)	Baldomero Espartero (1840–1843)	Isabella II (1833–1868)u
62		Marcelino de Oraá Lecumberri (1788–1851)	February 14, 1841	June 17, 1843	Depending on the Minister of the Navy	Joaquín María Ferrer (1841)	Baldomero Espartero (1840–1843)	Isabella II (1833–1868)u
62		Marcelino de Oraá Lecumberri (1788–1851)	February 14, 1841	June 17, 1843	Depending on the Minister of the Navy	Antonio González (1841–1842)	Baldomero Espartero (1840–1843)	Isabella II (1833–1868)u
62		Marcelino de Oraá Lecumberri (1788–1851)	February 14, 1841	June 17, 1843	Depending on the Minister of the Navy	José Ramón Rodil (1842–1843)	Baldomero Espartero (1840–1843)	Isabella II (1833–1868)u
62		Marcelino de Oraá Lecumberri (1788–1851)	February 14, 1841	June 17, 1843	Depending on the Minister of the Navy	Joaquín María López (1843)	Baldomero Espartero (1840–1843)	Isabella II (1833–1868)u
62		Marcelino de Oraá Lecumberri (1788–1851)	February 14, 1841	June 17, 1843	Depending on the Minister of the Navy	Álvaro Gómez Becerra (1843)	Baldomero Espartero (1840–1843)	Isabella II (1833–1868)u
63		Francisco de Paula Alcalá de la Torre	June 17, 1843	July 16, 1844	Depending on the Minister of the Navy	Álvaro Gómez Becerra (1843)	Baldomero Espartero (1840–1843)	Isabella II (1833–1868)u
63		Francisco de Paula Alcalá de la Torre	June 17, 1843	July 16, 1844	Depending on the Minister of the Navy	Joaquín María López (1843) (Note: As President of the Provisional Government)		Isabella II (1833–1868)u
63		Francisco de Paula Alcalá de la Torre	June 17, 1843	July 16, 1844	Depending on the Minister of the Navy	Salustiano Olózaga (1843)	No regency	Isabella II (1833–1868)u
63		Francisco de Paula Alcalá de la Torre	June 17, 1843	July 16, 1844	Depending on the Minister of the Navy	Luis González Bravo (1843–1844)	No regency	Isabella II (1833–1868)u
63		Francisco de Paula Alcalá de la Torre	June 17, 1843	July 16, 1844	Depending on the Minister of the Navy	Ramón María Narváez (1844–1846)	No regency	Isabella II (1833–1868)u
64		Narciso Clavería y Zaldúa 1st Count of Manila (1795–1851)	July 16, 1844	December 26, 1849	Depending on the Minister of the Navy	Ramón María Narváez (1844–1846)	No regency	Isabella II (1833–1868)u
64		Narciso Clavería y Zaldúa 1st Count of Manila (1795–1851)	July 16, 1844	December 26, 1849	Depending on the Minister of the Navy	Manuel Pando, 6th Marquess of Miraflores (1846)	No regency	Isabella II (1833–1868)u
64		Narciso Clavería y Zaldúa 1st Count of Manila (1795–1851)	July 16, 1844	December 26, 1849	Depending on the Minister of the Navy	Ramón María Narváez (1846)	No regency	Isabella II (1833–1868)u
64		Narciso Clavería y Zaldúa 1st Count of Manila (1795–1851)	July 16, 1844	December 26, 1849	Depending on the Minister of the Navy	Francisco Javier de Istúriz (1846–1847)	No regency	Isabella II (1833–1868)u
64		Narciso Clavería y Zaldúa 1st Count of Manila (1795–1851)	July 16, 1844	December 26, 1849	Depending on the Minister of the Navy	Carlos Martínez de Irujo, 2nd Marquis of Casa Irujo (1847)	No regency	Isabella II (1833–1868)u
64		Narciso Clavería y Zaldúa 1st Count of Manila (1795–1851)	July 16, 1844	December 26, 1849	No minister	Carlos Martínez de Irujo, 2nd Marquis of Casa Irujo (1847)	No regency	Isabella II (1833–1868)u
64		Narciso Clavería y Zaldúa 1st Count of Manila (1795–1851)	July 16, 1844	December 26, 1849	No minister	Joaquín Francisco Pacheco (1847)	No regency	Isabella II (1833–1868)u
64		Narciso Clavería y Zaldúa 1st Count of Manila (1795–1851)	July 16, 1844	December 26, 1849	No minister	Florencio García Goyena (1847)	No regency	Isabella II (1833–1868)u
64		Narciso Clavería y Zaldúa 1st Count of Manila (1795–1851)	July 16, 1844	December 26, 1849	No minister	Ramón María Narváez (1847–1849)	No regency	Isabella II (1833–1868)u
64		Narciso Clavería y Zaldúa 1st Count of Manila (1795–1851)	July 16, 1844	December 26, 1849	No minister	Serafín María de Sotto (1849)	No regency	Isabella II (1833–1868)u
64		Narciso Clavería y Zaldúa 1st Count of Manila (1795–1851)	July 16, 1844	December 26, 1849	No minister	Ramón María Narváez (1849–1851)	No regency	Isabella II (1833–1868)u
65		Antonio María Blanco Acting Governor-General	December 26, 1849	July 29, 1850	No minister	Ramón María Narváez (1849–1851)	No regency	Isabella II (1833–1868)u
66		Juan Antonio de Urbiztondo, Marquis of La Solana (1803–1857)	July 29, 1850	December 20, 1853	No minister	Ramón María Narváez (1849–1851)	No regency	Isabella II (1833–1868)u
66		Juan Antonio de Urbiztondo, Marquis of La Solana (1803–1857)	July 29, 1850	December 20, 1853	Juan Bravo Murillo (1851–1852) (Note: Depending on the Overseas over the President of the Council of Ministers as an additional affair.)		No regency	Isabella II (1833–1868)u
66		Juan Antonio de Urbiztondo, Marquis of La Solana (1803–1857)	July 29, 1850	December 20, 1853	Federico Roncali, Count of Alcoy (1852–1853)		No regency	Isabella II (1833–1868)u
66		Juan Antonio de Urbiztondo, Marquis of La Solana (1803–1857)	July 29, 1850	December 20, 1853	Francisco Lersundi (1853)		No regency	Isabella II (1833–1868)u
66		Juan Antonio de Urbiztondo, Marquis of La Solana (1803–1857)	July 29, 1850	December 20, 1853	Luis José Sartorius, Count of San Luis (1853–1854)		No regency	Isabella II (1833–1868)u
67		Ramón Montero y Blandino Acting Governor-General	December 20, 1853	February 2, 1854	Luis José Sartorius, Count of San Luis (1853–1854)		No regency	Isabella II (1833–1868)u
68		Manuel Pavía y Lacy 1st Marquess of Novaliches (1814–1896)	February 2, 1854	October 28, 1854	Luis José Sartorius, Count of San Luis (1853–1854)		No regency	Isabella II (1833–1868)u
68		Manuel Pavía y Lacy 1st Marquess of Novaliches (1814–1896)	February 2, 1854	October 28, 1854	Depending on the Minister of State	Fernando Fernández de Córdoba (1854)	No regency	Isabella II (1833–1868)u
68		Manuel Pavía y Lacy 1st Marquess of Novaliches (1814–1896)	February 2, 1854	October 28, 1854	Depending on the Minister of State	Ángel de Saavedra, 3rd Duke of Rivas (1854)	No regency	Isabella II (1833–1868)u
68		Manuel Pavía y Lacy 1st Marquess of Novaliches (1814–1896)	February 2, 1854	October 28, 1854	Depending on the Minister of State	Baldomero Espartero (1854–1856)	No regency	Isabella II (1833–1868)u
(67)		Ramón Montero y Blandino Acting Governor-General	October 28, 1854	November 20, 1854	Depending on the Minister of State	Baldomero Espartero (1854–1856)	No regency	Isabella II (1833–1868)u
69		Manuel Crespo y Cebrían (1793–1868)	November 20, 1854	December 5, 1856	Depending on the Minister of State	Baldomero Espartero (1854–1856)	No regency	Isabella II (1833–1868)u
69		Manuel Crespo y Cebrían (1793–1868)	November 20, 1854	December 5, 1856	No minister	Baldomero Espartero (1854–1856)	No regency	Isabella II (1833–1868)u
69		Manuel Crespo y Cebrían (1793–1868)	November 20, 1854	December 5, 1856	Depending on the Minister of Development	Baldomero Espartero (1854–1856)	No regency	Isabella II (1833–1868)u
69		Manuel Crespo y Cebrían (1793–1868)	November 20, 1854	December 5, 1856	Depending on the Minister of State	Leopoldo O'Donnell (1856)	No regency	Isabella II (1833–1868)u
69		Manuel Crespo y Cebrían (1793–1868)	November 20, 1854	December 5, 1856	Depending on the Minister of State	Ramón María Narváez (1856–1857)	No regency	Isabella II (1833–1868)u
(67)		Ramón Montero y Blandino Acting Governor-General	December 5, 1856	March 9, 1857	Depending on the Minister of State	Ramón María Narváez (1856–1857)	No regency	Isabella II (1833–1868)u
70		Fernando de Norzagaray y Escudero (1808–1860)	March 9, 1857	January 12, 1860	Depending on the Minister of State	Ramón María Narváez (1856–1857)	No regency	Isabella II (1833–1868)u
70		Fernando de Norzagaray y Escudero (1808–1860)	March 9, 1857	January 12, 1860	Depending on the Minister of State	Francisco Armero (1857–1858)	No regency	Isabella II (1833–1868)u
70		Fernando de Norzagaray y Escudero (1808–1860)	March 9, 1857	January 12, 1860	Depending on the Minister of State	Francisco Javier de Istúriz (1858)	No regency	Isabella II (1833–1868)u
70		Fernando de Norzagaray y Escudero (1808–1860)	March 9, 1857	January 12, 1860	Leopoldo O'Donnell (1858–1863)		No regency	Isabella II (1833–1868)u
71		Ramón María Solano y Llanderal	January 12, 1860	August 29, 1860	Leopoldo O'Donnell (1858–1863)		No regency	Isabella II (1833–1868)u
72		Juan Herrera Dávila Acting Governor-General	August 29, 1860	February 2, 1861	Leopoldo O'Donnell (1858–1863)		No regency	Isabella II (1833–1868)u
73		José Lémery e Ibarrola (1811–1886)	February 2, 1861	July 7, 1862	Leopoldo O'Donnell (1858–1863)		No regency	Isabella II (1833–1868)u
74		Salvador Valdés Acting Governor-General	July 7, 1862	July 9, 1862	Leopoldo O'Donnell (1858–1863)		No regency	Isabella II (1833–1868)u
75		Rafaél de Echagüe y Bermingham (1815–1915)	July 9, 1862	March 24, 1865	Leopoldo O'Donnell (1858–1863)		No regency	Isabella II (1833–1868)u
75		Rafaél de Echagüe y Bermingham (1815–1915)	July 9, 1862	March 24, 1865	Manuel Pando, 6th Marquess of Miraflores (1863)	Manuel Pando, 6th Marquess of Miraflores (1863–1864)	No regency	Isabella II (1833–1868)u
75		Rafaél de Echagüe y Bermingham (1815–1915)	July 9, 1862	March 24, 1865	José Gutiérrez de la Concha, 1st Marquess of Havana (1863) Interim	Manuel Pando, 6th Marquess of Miraflores (1863–1864)	No regency	Isabella II (1833–1868)u
75		Rafaél de Echagüe y Bermingham (1815–1915)	July 9, 1862	March 24, 1865	Francisco Permanyer Tuyets (1863)	Manuel Pando, 6th Marquess of Miraflores (1863–1864)	No regency	Isabella II (1833–1868)u
75		Rafaél de Echagüe y Bermingham (1815–1915)	July 9, 1862	March 24, 1865	José Gutiérrez de la Concha, 1st Marquess of Havana (1863–1864) Interim	Manuel Pando, 6th Marquess of Miraflores (1863–1864)	No regency	Isabella II (1833–1868)u
75		Rafaél de Echagüe y Bermingham (1815–1915)	July 9, 1862	March 24, 1865	Alejandro de Castro y Casal (1864)	Lorenzo Arrazola (1864)	No regency	Isabella II (1833–1868)u
75		Rafaél de Echagüe y Bermingham (1815–1915)	July 9, 1862	March 24, 1865	Diego López Ballesteros (1864)	Alejandro Mon y Menéndez (1864)	No regency	Isabella II (1833–1868)u
75		Rafaél de Echagüe y Bermingham (1815–1915)	July 9, 1862	March 24, 1865	Manuel Seijas Lozano (1864–1865)	Ramón María Narváez (1864–1865)	No regency	Isabella II (1833–1868)u
76		Joaquín del Solar e Ibáñez Acting Governor-General	March 24, 1865	April 25, 1865	Manuel Seijas Lozano (1864–1865)	Ramón María Narváez (1864–1865)	No regency	Isabella II (1833–1868)u
77		Juan de Lara e Irigoyen	April 25, 1865	July 13, 1866	Manuel Seijas Lozano (1864–1865)	Ramón María Narváez (1864–1865)	No regency	Isabella II (1833–1868)u
77		Juan de Lara e Irigoyen	April 25, 1865	July 13, 1866	Antonio Cánovas del Castillo (1865–1866)	Leopoldo O'Donnell (1865–1866)	No regency	Isabella II (1833–1868)u
77		Juan de Lara e Irigoyen	April 25, 1865	July 13, 1866	Alejandro de Castro Casal (1866–1867)	Ramón María Narváez (1866–1868)	No regency	Isabella II (1833–1868)u
78		José Laureano de Sanz y Posse Acting Governor-General (1819–1898)	July 13, 1866	September 21, 1866	Alejandro de Castro Casal (1866–1867)	Ramón María Narváez (1866–1868)	No regency	Isabella II (1833–1868)u
79		Antonio Osorio y Mallén (1808-1881) Acting Governor-General	September 21, 1866	September 27, 1866	Alejandro de Castro Casal (1866–1867)	Ramón María Narváez (1866–1868)	No regency	Isabella II (1833–1868)u
(76)		Joaquín del Solar e Ibáñez	September 27, 1866	October 26, 1866	Alejandro de Castro Casal (1866–1867)	Ramón María Narváez (1866–1868)	No regency	Isabella II (1833–1868)u
80		José de la Gándara y Navarro (1820–1885)	October 26, 1866	June 7, 1869	Alejandro de Castro Casal (1866–1867)	Ramón María Narváez (1866–1868)	No regency	Isabella II (1833–1868)u
80		José de la Gándara y Navarro (1820–1885)	October 26, 1866	June 7, 1869	Carlos Marfori y Callejas (1867–1868)	Ramón María Narváez (1866–1868)	No regency	Isabella II (1833–1868)u
80		José de la Gándara y Navarro (1820–1885)	October 26, 1866	June 7, 1869	Carlos Marfori y Callejas (1867–1868)	Luis González Bravo (1868)	No regency	Isabella II (1833–1868)u
80		José de la Gándara y Navarro (1820–1885)	October 26, 1866	June 7, 1869	Tomás Rodríguez Rubí (1868)	Luis González Bravo (1868)	No regency	Isabella II (1833–1868)u
80		José de la Gándara y Navarro (1820–1885)	October 26, 1866	June 7, 1869	Tomás Rodríguez Rubí (1868)	José Gutiérrez de la Concha, 1st Marquess of Havana (1868)	No regency	Isabella II (1833–1868)u
80		José de la Gándara y Navarro (1820–1885)	October 26, 1866	June 7, 1869	José Nacarino Bravo (1868)	José Gutiérrez de la Concha, 1st Marquess of Havana (1868)	No regency	Isabella II (1833–1868)u
80		José de la Gándara y Navarro (1820–1885)	October 26, 1866	June 7, 1869	Adelardo López de Ayala (1868–1869)	Francisco Serrano 1st Duke of la Torre (1868–1869)	Francisco Serrano 1st Duke of la Torre Regent (1868–1870)	
80		José de la Gándara y Navarro (1820–1885)	October 26, 1866	June 7, 1869	Juan Bautista Topete (1869) Interim	Francisco Serrano 1st Duke of la Torre (1868–1869)	Francisco Serrano 1st Duke of la Torre Regent (1868–1870)	
(81)		Manuel Maldonado Acting Governor-General	June 7, 1869	June 23, 1869	Juan Bautista Topete (1869) Interim	Juan Prim (1869–1870)	Francisco Serrano 1st Duke of la Torre Regent (1868–1870)	
82		Carlos María de la Torre y Navacerrada (1809–1879)	June 23, 1869	April 4, 1871	Juan Bautista Topete (1869) Interim	Juan Prim (1869–1870)	Francisco Serrano 1st Duke of la Torre Regent (1868–1870)	
82		Carlos María de la Torre y Navacerrada (1809–1879)	June 23, 1869	April 4, 1871	Manuel Becerra y Bermúdez (1869–1870)	Juan Prim (1869–1870)	Francisco Serrano 1st Duke of la Torre Regent (1868–1870)	
82		Carlos María de la Torre y Navacerrada (1809–1879)	June 23, 1869	April 4, 1871	Segismundo Moret (1870)	Juan Prim (1869–1870)	Francisco Serrano 1st Duke of la Torre Regent (1868–1870)	
82		Carlos María de la Torre y Navacerrada (1809–1879)	June 23, 1869	April 4, 1871	Adelardo López de Ayala (1870–1871)	Juan Bautista Topete (1870–1871); Interim	Francisco Serrano 1st Duke of la Torre Regent (1868–1870)	
82		Carlos María de la Torre y Navacerrada (1809–1879)	June 23, 1869	April 4, 1871	Adelardo López de Ayala (1870–1871)	Juan Bautista Topete (1870–1871); Interim	No regency	Amadeo I (1870–1873)
83		Rafael Izquierdo y Gutiérrez (1820–1883)	April 4, 1871	January 8, 1873	Adelardo López de Ayala (1870–1871)	Francisco Serrano 1st Duke of la Torre (1871)	No regency	Amadeo I (1870–1873)
83		Rafael Izquierdo y Gutiérrez (1820–1883)	April 4, 1871	January 8, 1873	Tomás Mosquera (1871)	Manuel Ruiz Zorrilla (1871)	No regency	Amadeo I (1870–1873)
83		Rafael Izquierdo y Gutiérrez (1820–1883)	April 4, 1871	January 8, 1873	Víctor Balaguer (1871)	José Malcampo (1871)	No regency	Amadeo I (1870–1873)
83		Rafael Izquierdo y Gutiérrez (1820–1883)	April 4, 1871	January 8, 1873	Juan Bautista Topete (1871–1872)	Práxedes Mateo Sagasta (1871–1872)	No regency	Amadeo I (1870–1873)
83		Rafael Izquierdo y Gutiérrez (1820–1883)	April 4, 1871	January 8, 1873	Cristóbal Martín de Herrera (1872)	Práxedes Mateo Sagasta (1871–1872)	No regency	Amadeo I (1870–1873)
83		Rafael Izquierdo y Gutiérrez (1820–1883)	April 4, 1871	January 8, 1873	Adelardo López de Ayala (1872)	Francisco Serrano 1st Duke of la Torre (1872)	No regency	Amadeo I (1870–1873)
83		Rafael Izquierdo y Gutiérrez (1820–1883)	April 4, 1871	January 8, 1873	Eduardo Gasset y Artime (1872)	Manuel Ruiz Zorrilla (1872–1873)	No regency	Amadeo I (1870–1873)
83		Rafael Izquierdo y Gutiérrez (1820–1883)	April 4, 1871	January 8, 1873	Tomás Mosquera (1872–1873)	Manuel Ruiz Zorrilla (1872–1873)	No regency	Amadeo I (1870–1873)
(84)		Manuel MacCrohon Acting Governor-General	January 8, 1873	January 24, 1873	Tomás Mosquera (1872–1873)	Manuel Ruiz Zorrilla (1872–1873)	No regency	Amadeo I (1870–1873)
85		Juan Alaminos y Vivar (1813–1899)	January 24, 1873	March 17, 1874	Tomás Mosquera (1872–1873)	Manuel Ruiz Zorrilla (1872–1873)	No regency	Amadeo I (1870–1873)
85		Juan Alaminos y Vivar (1813–1899)	January 24, 1873	March 17, 1874	Nicolás Salmerón y Alonso (1873)	Estanislao Figueras President of the Executive Power (1873)		
85		Juan Alaminos y Vivar (1813–1899)	January 24, 1873	March 17, 1874	José Cristóbal Sorní y Grau (1873)	Estanislao Figueras President of the Executive Power (1873)		
85		Juan Alaminos y Vivar (1813–1899)	January 24, 1873	March 17, 1874	José Cristóbal Sorní y Grau (1873)	Francesc Pi i Margall President of the Executive Power (1873)		
85		Juan Alaminos y Vivar (1813–1899)	January 24, 1873	March 17, 1874	Francisco Suñer (1873)	Francesc Pi i Margall President of the Executive Power (1873)		
85		Juan Alaminos y Vivar (1813–1899)	January 24, 1873	March 17, 1874	Eduardo Palanca (1873)	Nicolás Salmerón y Alonso President of the Executive Power (1873)		
85		Juan Alaminos y Vivar (1813–1899)	January 24, 1873	March 17, 1874	Santiago Soler y Pla (1873–1874)	Emilio Castelar President of the Executive Power (1873–1874)		
85		Juan Alaminos y Vivar (1813–1899)	January 24, 1873	March 17, 1874	Víctor Balaguer (1874)	Francisco Serrano (1874)	No regency	Francisco Serrano President (1874)
85		Juan Alaminos y Vivar (1813–1899)	January 24, 1873	March 17, 1874	Antonio Romero Ortiz (1874)	Juan Zavala de la Puente (1874)	No regency	Francisco Serrano President (1874)
86		Manuel Blanco Valderrama Acting Governor-General	March 17, 1874	June 18, 1874	Antonio Romero Ortiz (1874)	Juan Zavala de la Puente (1874)	No regency	Francisco Serrano President (1874)
87		José Malcampo 3rd Marquess of San Rafael (1828–1880)	June 18, 1874	February 28, 1877	Antonio Romero Ortiz (1874)	Juan Zavala de la Puente (1874)	No regency	Francisco Serrano President (1874)
87		José Malcampo 3rd Marquess of San Rafael (1828–1880)	June 18, 1874	February 28, 1877	Antonio Romero Ortiz (1874)	Práxedes Mateo Sagasta (1874)	No regency	Francisco Serrano President (1874)
87		José Malcampo 3rd Marquess of San Rafael (1828–1880)	June 18, 1874	February 28, 1877	Adelardo López de Ayala (1874–1877)	Antonio Cánovas del Castillo (1874–1875)	Antonio Cánovas del Castillo (1874–1875) (Note: As President of the Regency Ministry)	Alfonso XII (1874–1885)
87		José Malcampo 3rd Marquess of San Rafael (1828–1880)	June 18, 1874	February 28, 1877	Adelardo López de Ayala (1874–1877)	Antonio Cánovas del Castillo (1874–1875)	No regency	Alfonso XII (1874–1885)
87		José Malcampo 3rd Marquess of San Rafael (1828–1880)	June 18, 1874	February 28, 1877	Adelardo López de Ayala (1874–1877)	Joaquín Jovellar (1875)	No regency	Alfonso XII (1874–1885)
87		José Malcampo 3rd Marquess of San Rafael (1828–1880)	June 18, 1874	February 28, 1877	Adelardo López de Ayala (1874–1877)	Antonio Cánovas del Castillo (1875–1879)	No regency	Alfonso XII (1874–1885)
87		José Malcampo 3rd Marquess of San Rafael (1828–1880)	June 18, 1874	February 28, 1877	Cristóbal Martín de Herrera (1877–1878)	Antonio Cánovas del Castillo (1875–1879)	No regency	Alfonso XII (1874–1885)
88		Domingo Moriones y Murillo (1823–1881)	February 28, 1877	March 20, 1880	Cristóbal Martín de Herrera (1877–1878)	Antonio Cánovas del Castillo (1875–1879)	No regency	Alfonso XII (1874–1885)
88		Domingo Moriones y Murillo (1823–1881)	February 28, 1877	March 20, 1880	José Elduayen Gorriti (1878–1879)	Antonio Cánovas del Castillo (1875–1879)	No regency	Alfonso XII (1874–1885)
88		Domingo Moriones y Murillo (1823–1881)	February 28, 1877	March 20, 1880	Manuel Orovio Echagüe (1879) Interim	Arsenio Martínez-Campos (1879)	No regency	Alfonso XII (1874–1885)
88		Domingo Moriones y Murillo (1823–1881)	February 28, 1877	March 20, 1880	Salvador Albacete (1879)	Arsenio Martínez-Campos (1879)	No regency	Alfonso XII (1874–1885)
88		Domingo Moriones y Murillo (1823–1881)	February 28, 1877	March 20, 1880	José Elduayen Gorriti (1879–1880)	Antonio Cánovas del Castillo (1879–1881)	No regency	Alfonso XII (1874–1885)
88		Domingo Moriones y Murillo (1823–1881)	February 28, 1877	March 20, 1880	Cayetano Sánchez Bustillo (1880–1881)	Antonio Cánovas del Castillo (1879–1881)	No regency	Alfonso XII (1874–1885)
89		Rafael Rodríguez Arias Acting Governor-General (1819–1898)	March 20, 1880	April 15, 1880	Cayetano Sánchez Bustillo (1880–1881)	Antonio Cánovas del Castillo (1879–1881)	No regency	Alfonso XII (1874–1885)
90		Fernando Primo de Rivera 1st Marquess of Estella (1831–1921)	April 15, 1880	March 10, 1883	Cayetano Sánchez Bustillo (1880–1881)	Antonio Cánovas del Castillo (1879–1881)	No regency	Alfonso XII (1874–1885)
90		Fernando Primo de Rivera 1st Marquess of Estella (1831–1921)	April 15, 1880	March 10, 1883	Fernando León y Castillo (1881–1883)	Práxedes Mateo Sagasta (1881–1883)	No regency	Alfonso XII (1874–1885)
90		Fernando Primo de Rivera 1st Marquess of Estella (1831–1921)	April 15, 1880	March 10, 1883	Gaspar Núñez de Arce (1883)	Práxedes Mateo Sagasta (1881–1883)	No regency	Alfonso XII (1874–1885)
(91)		Emilio de Molíns Acting Governor-General (1824–1889)	March 10, 1883	April 7, 1883	Gaspar Núñez de Arce (1883)	Práxedes Mateo Sagasta (1881–1883)	No regency	Alfonso XII (1874–1885)
92		Joaquín Jovellar y Soler (1819–1892)	April 7, 1883	April 1, 1885	Gaspar Núñez de Arce (1883)	Práxedes Mateo Sagasta (1881–1883)	No regency	Alfonso XII (1874–1885)
92		Joaquín Jovellar y Soler (1819–1892)	April 7, 1883	April 1, 1885	Estanislao Suárez Inclán (1883–1884)	José Posada Herrera (1883–1884)	No regency	Alfonso XII (1874–1885)
92		Joaquín Jovellar y Soler (1819–1892)	April 7, 1883	April 1, 1885	Manuel Aguirre de Tejada (1884–1885)	Antonio Cánovas del Castillo (1884–1885)	No regency	Alfonso XII (1874–1885)
(91)		Emilio de Molíns Acting Governor-General (1824–1889)	April 1, 1885	April 4, 1885	Manuel Aguirre de Tejada (1884–1885)	Antonio Cánovas del Castillo (1884–1885)	No regency	Alfonso XII (1874–1885)
92		Emilio Terrero y Perinat (1827–1890)	April 4, 1885	April 25, 1888	Manuel Aguirre de Tejada (1884–1885)	Antonio Cánovas del Castillo (1884–1885)	No regency	Alfonso XII (1874–1885)
92		Emilio Terrero y Perinat (1827–1890)	April 4, 1885	April 25, 1888	German Gamazo (1885–1886)	Antonio Cánovas del Castillo (1884–1885)	Maria Christina of Austria (1885–1902)	Vacant (1885–1886) (Note: Until the birth of Alfonso XIII)
92		Emilio Terrero y Perinat (1827–1890)	April 4, 1885	April 25, 1888	German Gamazo (1885–1886)	Práxedes Mateo Sagasta (1885–1890)	Maria Christina of Austria (1885–1902)	Vacant (1885–1886)
92		Emilio Terrero y Perinat (1827–1890)	April 4, 1885	April 25, 1888	German Gamazo (1885–1886)	Práxedes Mateo Sagasta (1885–1890)	Maria Christina of Austria (1885–1902)	Alfonso XIII (1886–1931)
92		Emilio Terrero y Perinat (1827–1890)	April 4, 1885	April 25, 1888	Víctor Balaguer (1886–1888)	Práxedes Mateo Sagasta (1885–1890)	Maria Christina of Austria (1885–1902)	Alfonso XIII (1886–1931)
93		Antonio Moltó y Díaz Berrio Acting Governor-General	April 25, 1888	June 4, 1888	Víctor Balaguer (1886–1888)	Práxedes Mateo Sagasta (1885–1890)	Maria Christina of Austria (1885–1902)	Alfonso XIII (1886–1931)
94		Federico Lobatón y Prieto Acting Governor-General	June 4, 1888	June 5, 1888	Víctor Balaguer (1886–1888)	Práxedes Mateo Sagasta (1885–1890)	Maria Christina of Austria (1885–1902)	Alfonso XIII (1886–1931)
95		Valeriano Weyler 1st Marquess of Tenerife (1838–1930)	June 5, 1888	November 17, 1891	Víctor Balaguer (1886–1888)	Práxedes Mateo Sagasta (1885–1890)	Maria Christina of Austria (1885–1902)	Alfonso XIII (1886–1931)
95		Valeriano Weyler 1st Marquess of Tenerife (1838–1930)	June 5, 1888	November 17, 1891	Trinitario Ruiz Capdepón (1888)	Práxedes Mateo Sagasta (1885–1890)	Maria Christina of Austria (1885–1902)	Alfonso XIII (1886–1931)
95		Valeriano Weyler 1st Marquess of Tenerife (1838–1930)	June 5, 1888	November 17, 1891	Manuel Becerra y Bermúdez (1888–1890)	Práxedes Mateo Sagasta (1885–1890)	Maria Christina of Austria (1885–1902)	Alfonso XIII (1886–1931)
95		Valeriano Weyler 1st Marquess of Tenerife (1838–1930)	June 5, 1888	November 17, 1891	Antonio María Fabié (1890–1891)	Antonio Cánovas del Castillo (1890–1892)	Maria Christina of Austria (1885–1902)	Alfonso XIII (1886–1931)
96		Eulogio Despujol y Dusay 1st Count of Caspe (1834–1907)	November 17, 1891	March 1, 1893	Antonio María Fabié (1890–1891)	Antonio Cánovas del Castillo (1890–1892)	Maria Christina of Austria (1885–1902)	Alfonso XIII (1886–1931)
96		Eulogio Despujol y Dusay 1st Count of Caspe (1834–1907)	November 17, 1891	March 1, 1893	Francisco Romero Robledo (1891–1892)	Antonio Cánovas del Castillo (1890–1892)	Maria Christina of Austria (1885–1902)	Alfonso XIII (1886–1931)
96		Eulogio Despujol y Dusay 1st Count of Caspe (1834–1907)	November 17, 1891	March 1, 1893	Antonio Maura (1892–1894)	Práxedes Mateo Sagasta (1892–1895)	Maria Christina of Austria (1885–1902)	Alfonso XIII (1886–1931)
97		Federico Ochando Acting Governor-General (1848–1929)	March 1, 1893	May 4, 1893	Antonio Maura (1892–1894)	Práxedes Mateo Sagasta (1892–1895)	Maria Christina of Austria (1885–1902)	Alfonso XIII (1886–1931)
98		Ramón Blanco 1st Marquess of Peña Plata (1833–1906)	May 4, 1893	December 13, 1896	Antonio Maura (1892–1894)	Práxedes Mateo Sagasta (1892–1895)	Maria Christina of Austria (1885–1902)	Alfonso XIII (1886–1931)
98		Ramón Blanco 1st Marquess of Peña Plata (1833–1906)	May 4, 1893	December 13, 1896	Manuel Becerra y Bermúdez (1894–1895)	Práxedes Mateo Sagasta (1892–1895)	Maria Christina of Austria (1885–1902)	Alfonso XIII (1886–1931)
98		Ramón Blanco 1st Marquess of Peña Plata (1833–1906)	May 4, 1893	December 13, 1896	Buenaventura Abárzuza Ferrer (1894–1895)	Práxedes Mateo Sagasta (1892–1895)	Maria Christina of Austria (1885–1902)	Alfonso XIII (1886–1931)
98		Ramón Blanco 1st Marquess of Peña Plata (1833–1906)	May 4, 1893	December 13, 1896	Tomás Castellano Villarroya (1895–1897)	Antonio Cánovas del Castillo (1895–1897)	Maria Christina of Austria (1885–1902)	Alfonso XIII (1886–1931)
99		Camilo Garcia de Polavieja 1st Marquess of Polavieja Acting Governor-General (1838–1914)	December 13, 1896	April 15, 1897	Tomás Castellano Villarroya (1895–1897)	Antonio Cánovas del Castillo (1895–1897)	Maria Christina of Austria (1885–1902)	Alfonso XIII (1886–1931)
100		José de Lachambre Acting Governor-General (1846–1903)	April 15, 1897	April 23, 1897	Tomás Castellano Villarroya (1895–1897)	Antonio Cánovas del Castillo (1895–1897)	Maria Christina of Austria (1885–1902)	Alfonso XIII (1886–1931)
(90)		Fernando Primo de Rivera 1st Marquess of Estella (1831–1921)	April 23, 1897	April 11, 1898	Tomás Castellano Villarroya (1895–1897)	Antonio Cánovas del Castillo (1895–1897)	Maria Christina of Austria (1885–1902)	Alfonso XIII (1886–1931)
(90)		Fernando Primo de Rivera 1st Marquess of Estella (1831–1921)	April 23, 1897	April 11, 1898	Tomás Castellano Villarroya (1895–1897)	Marcelo Azcárraga Palmero (1897)	Maria Christina of Austria (1885–1902)	Alfonso XIII (1886–1931)
(90)		Fernando Primo de Rivera 1st Marquess of Estella (1831–1921)	April 23, 1897	April 11, 1898	Segismundo Moret (1897–1898)	Práxedes Mateo Sagasta (1897–1899)	Maria Christina of Austria (1885–1902)	Alfonso XIII (1886–1931)
101		Basilio Augustín (1840–1910)	April 11, 1898	July 24, 1898	Segismundo Moret (1897–1898)	Práxedes Mateo Sagasta (1897–1899)	Maria Christina of Austria (1885–1902)	Alfonso XIII (1886–1931)
101		Basilio Augustín (1840–1910)	April 11, 1898	July 24, 1898	Vicente Romero Girón (1898–1899)	Práxedes Mateo Sagasta (1897–1899)	Maria Christina of Austria (1885–1902)	Alfonso XIII (1886–1931)
102		Fermín Jáudenes Acting Governor-General (1836–1915)	July 24, 1898	August 13, 1898	Vicente Romero Girón (1898–1899)	Práxedes Mateo Sagasta (1897–1899)	Maria Christina of Austria (1885–1902)	Alfonso XIII (1886–1931)
103		Francisco Rizzo Acting Governor-General (1831–1910)	August 13, 1898	September 18, 1898	Vicente Romero Girón (1898–1899)	Práxedes Mateo Sagasta (1897–1899)	Maria Christina of Austria (1885–1902)	Alfonso XIII (1886–1931)
104		Diego de los Ríos Acting Governor-General (1850–1911)	September 18, 1898	June 3, 1899	Vicente Romero Girón (1898–1899)	Práxedes Mateo Sagasta (1897–1899)	Maria Christina of Austria (1885–1902)	Alfonso XIII (1886–1931)
104		Diego de los Ríos Acting Governor-General (1850–1911)	September 18, 1898	June 3, 1899	Raimundo Fernández-Villaverde (1899) (Note: Serving as both Minister of Finance and Overseas)	Francisco Silvela (1899–1899)	Maria Christina of Austria (1885–1902)	Alfonso XIII (1886–1931)
104		Diego de los Ríos Acting Governor-General (1850–1911)	September 18, 1898	June 3, 1899	Office abolished	Francisco Silvela (1899–1899)	Maria Christina of Austria (1885–1902)	Alfonso XIII (1886–1931)

== United States Military Government (1898–1902) ==
The city of Manila was captured by American expeditionary forces on August 13, 1898. On August 14, 1898, the terms of the Spanish capitulation were signed. From this date, American government in the Philippines begins. General Wesley Merritt, in accordance with the instructions of the United States President, issued a proclamation announcing the establishment of United States military rule.

During the transition period, executive authority in all civil affairs in the Philippine government was exercised by the military governor.

No.	Portrait	Name	Tenure start	Tenure end	Secretary of War (Note: Responsible to the Bureau of Insular Affairs regarding the Philippines after the April 11, 1899 ratification of the 1898 Treaty of Paris.)	Vice President	President
1		Wesley Merritt (1836–1910)	August 14, 1898	August 30, 1898	Russell A. Alger (1897–1899)	Garret Hobart (1897–1899)	William McKinley (1897–1901)
2		Elwell Stephen Otis (1838–1909)	August 30, 1898	May 5, 1900	Russell A. Alger (1897–1899)	Garret Hobart (1897–1899)	William McKinley (1897–1901)
2		Elwell Stephen Otis (1838–1909)	August 30, 1898	May 5, 1900	Elihu Root (1899–1904)	Garret Hobart (1897–1899)	William McKinley (1897–1901)
2		Elwell Stephen Otis (1838–1909)	August 30, 1898	May 5, 1900	Elihu Root (1899–1904)	Vacant (Note: Garret Hobart died in office)	William McKinley (1897–1901)
3		Arthur MacArthur Jr. (1845–1912)	May 5, 1900	July 4, 1901	Elihu Root (1899–1904)	Vacant	William McKinley (1897–1901)
3		Arthur MacArthur Jr. (1845–1912)	May 5, 1900	July 4, 1901	Elihu Root (1899–1904)	Theodore Roosevelt (1901)	William McKinley (1897–1901)
4		Adna Chaffee (1842–1914)	July 4, 1901	July 4, 1902	Elihu Root (1899–1904)	Theodore Roosevelt (1901)	William McKinley (1897–1901)
4		Adna Chaffee (1842–1914)	July 4, 1901	July 4, 1902	Elihu Root (1899–1904)	Vacant (Note: Theodore Roosevelt took the presidency)	Theodore Roosevelt (1901–1909)

== Insular Government (1901–1935) ==
On July 4, 1901, executive authority over the islands was transferred to the president of the Second Philippine Commission who had the title of Civil Governor, a position appointed by the President of the United States and approved by the United States Senate. For the first year, a Military Governor, Adna Chaffee, ruled parts of the country still resisting the American rule, concurrent with Civil Governor, William Howard Taft. Disagreements between the two were not uncommon. The following year, on July 4, 1902, Taft became the sole executive authority. Chaffee remained commander of the Philippine Division until September 30, 1902.

After his retirement as Civil Governor, Governor Taft was appointed Secretary of War and he secured for his successor the adoption by Congress of the title Governor-General of the Philippine Islands thereby "reviving the high designation used during the last period of Spanish rule and placing the office on a parity of dignity with that of other colonial empires of first importance". The term "insular" (from insula, the Latin word for island) refers to U.S. island territories that are not incorporated into either a state or a federal district. All insular areas were under the authority of the U.S. Bureau of Insular Affairs, a division of the US War Department.

No.	Portrait	Name	Tenure start	Tenure end	Secretary of War	Vice President	President
1		William Howard Taft (1857–1930)	July 4, 1901	February 1, 1904	Elihu Root (1899–1904)	Garret Hobart (1897–1899)	William McKinley (1897–1901)
1		William Howard Taft (1857–1930)	July 4, 1901	February 1, 1904	Elihu Root (1899–1904)	Vacant	William McKinley (1897–1901)
1		William Howard Taft (1857–1930)	July 4, 1901	February 1, 1904	Elihu Root (1899–1904)	Theodore Roosevelt (1901)	William McKinley (1897–1901)
1		William Howard Taft (1857–1930)	July 4, 1901	February 1, 1904	William Howard Taft(1904–1908)	Vacant	Theodore Roosevelt (1901–1909)
2		Luke Edward Wright (1846–1922)	February 1, 1904	November 3, 1905	William Howard Taft(1904–1908)	Vacant	Theodore Roosevelt (1901–1909)
2		Luke Edward Wright (1846–1922)	February 1, 1904	November 3, 1905	William Howard Taft(1904–1908)	Charles W. Fairbanks (1905–1909)	Theodore Roosevelt (1901–1909)
3		Henry Clay Ide (1844–1921)	November 3, 1905	September 19, 1906	William Howard Taft(1904–1908)	Charles W. Fairbanks (1905–1909)	Theodore Roosevelt (1901–1909)
4		James Francis Smith (1859–1928)	September 20, 1906	November 11, 1909	William Howard Taft(1904–1908)	Charles W. Fairbanks (1905–1909)	Theodore Roosevelt (1901–1909)
4		James Francis Smith (1859–1928)	September 20, 1906	November 11, 1909	Luke Edward Wright (1908–1909)	Charles W. Fairbanks (1905–1909)	Theodore Roosevelt (1901–1909)
4		James Francis Smith (1859–1928)	September 20, 1906	November 11, 1909	Jacob M. Dickinson (1909–1911)	James S. Sherman (1909–1912)	William Howard Taft (1909–1913)
5		William Cameron Forbes (1870–1959)	November 11, 1909	September 1, 1913	Jacob M. Dickinson (1909–1911)	James S. Sherman (1909–1912)	William Howard Taft (1909–1913)
5		William Cameron Forbes (1870–1959)	November 11, 1909	September 1, 1913	Henry L. Stimson (1911–1913)	James S. Sherman (1909–1912)	William Howard Taft (1909–1913)
5		William Cameron Forbes (1870–1959)	November 11, 1909	September 1, 1913	Henry L. Stimson (1911–1913)	Vacant (Note: James S. Sherman died in office)	William Howard Taft (1909–1913)
5		William Cameron Forbes (1870–1959)	November 11, 1909	September 1, 1913	Lindley Miller Garrison (1913–1916)	Thomas R. Marshall (1913–1921)	Woodrow Wilson (1913–1921)
–		Newton W. Gilbert (1862–1939); Acting Governor-General	September 1, 1913	October 6, 1913	Lindley Miller Garrison (1913–1916)	Thomas R. Marshall (1913–1921)	Woodrow Wilson (1913–1921)
6		Francis Burton Harrison (1873–1957)	October 6, 1913	March 5, 1921	Lindley Miller Garrison (1913–1916)	Thomas R. Marshall (1913–1921)	Woodrow Wilson (1913–1921)
6		Francis Burton Harrison (1873–1957)	October 6, 1913	March 5, 1921	Newton D. Baker (1916–1921)	Thomas R. Marshall (1913–1921)	Woodrow Wilson (1913–1921)
6		Francis Burton Harrison (1873–1957)	October 6, 1913	March 5, 1921	John W. Weeks (1921–1925)	Calvin Coolidge (1921–1923)	Warren G. Harding (1921–1923)
–		Charles Yeater (1861–1943); Acting Governor-General	March 5, 1921	October 14, 1921	John W. Weeks (1921–1925)	Calvin Coolidge (1921–1923)	Warren G. Harding (1921–1923)
7		Leonard Wood (1860–1927)	October 14, 1921	August 7, 1927	John W. Weeks (1921–1925)	Calvin Coolidge (1921–1923)	Warren G. Harding (1921–1923)
7		Leonard Wood (1860–1927)	October 14, 1921	August 7, 1927	John W. Weeks (1921–1925)	Vacant (Note: Coolidge succeeded to the presidency intra-term)	Calvin Coolidge (1923–1929)
7		Leonard Wood (1860–1927)	October 14, 1921	August 7, 1927	John W. Weeks (1921–1925)	Charles G. Dawes (1925–1929)	Calvin Coolidge (1923–1929)
7		Leonard Wood (1860–1927)	October 14, 1921	August 7, 1927	Dwight F. Davis (1925–1929)	Charles G. Dawes (1925–1929)	Calvin Coolidge (1923–1929)
–		Eugene Allen Gilmore (1871–1953); Acting Governor-General	August 7, 1927	December 27, 1927	Dwight F. Davis (1925–1929)	Charles G. Dawes (1925–1929)	Calvin Coolidge (1923–1929)
8		Henry L. Stimson (1867–1950)	December 27, 1927	February 23, 1929	Dwight F. Davis (1925–1929)	Charles G. Dawes (1925–1929)	Calvin Coolidge (1923–1929)
–		Eugene Allen Gilmore (1871–1953); Acting Governor-General	February 23, 1929	July 8, 1929	Dwight F. Davis (1925–1929)	Charles G. Dawes (1925–1929)	Calvin Coolidge (1923–1929)
–		Eugene Allen Gilmore (1871–1953); Acting Governor-General	February 23, 1929	July 8, 1929	James W. Good (1929)	Charles Curtis (1929–1933)	Herbert Hoover (1929–1933)
9		Dwight F. Davis (1879–1945)	July 8, 1929	January 9, 1932	James W. Good (1929)	Charles Curtis (1929–1933)	Herbert Hoover (1929–1933)
9		Dwight F. Davis (1879–1945)	July 8, 1929	January 9, 1932	Patrick J. Hurley (1929–1933)	Charles Curtis (1929–1933)	Herbert Hoover (1929–1933)
–		George C. Butte (1877–1940); Acting Governor-General	January 9, 1932	February 29, 1932	Patrick J. Hurley (1929–1933)	Charles Curtis (1929–1933)	Herbert Hoover (1929–1933)
10		Theodore Roosevelt Jr. (1886–1944)	February 29, 1932	July 15, 1933	Patrick J. Hurley (1929–1933)	Charles Curtis (1929–1933)	Herbert Hoover (1929–1933)
10		Theodore Roosevelt Jr. (1886–1944)	February 29, 1932	July 15, 1933	George Dern (1933–1936)	John Nance Garner (1933–1941)	Franklin D. Roosevelt (1933–1945)
11		Frank Murphy (1890–1949)	July 15, 1933	November 14, 1935	George Dern (1933–1936)	John Nance Garner (1933–1941)	Franklin D. Roosevelt (1933–1945)

== High Commissioner to the Philippines (1935–1942 and 1945–1946) ==
On November 15, 1935, the Commonwealth of the Philippines was inaugurated as a transitional government to prepare the country for independence. The office of President of the Philippine Commonwealth replaced the Governor-General as the country's chief executive. The Governor-General became the High Commissioner of the Philippines with Frank Murphy, the last governor-general, as the first high commissioner. The High Commissioner exercised no executive power but rather represented the colonial power, the United States Government, in the Philippines. The high commissioner moved from Malacañang Palace to the newly built High Commissioner's Residence, now the Embassy of the United States in Manila.

After the Philippine independence on July 4, 1946, the last High Commissioner, Paul McNutt, became the first United States Ambassador to the Philippines.

No.	Portrait	Name	Tenure start	Tenure end	Secretary of War	Vice President	President
1		Frank Murphy (1890–1949)	November 14, 1935	December 31, 1936	George Dern (1933–1936)	John Nance Garner (1933–1941)	Franklin D. Roosevelt (1933–1945)
1		Frank Murphy (1890–1949)	November 14, 1935	December 31, 1936	Harry Hines Woodring (1936–1940)	John Nance Garner (1933–1941)	Franklin D. Roosevelt (1933–1945)
–		J. Weldon Jones (1896–1982); Acting High Commissioner	December 31, 1936	April 26, 1937	Harry Hines Woodring (1936–1940)	John Nance Garner (1933–1941)	Franklin D. Roosevelt (1933–1945)
2		Paul V. McNutt (1891–1955)	April 26, 1937	July 12, 1939	Harry Hines Woodring (1936–1940)	John Nance Garner (1933–1941)	Franklin D. Roosevelt (1933–1945)
–		J. Weldon Jones (1896–1982); Acting High Commissioner	July 12, 1939	October 28, 1939	Harry Hines Woodring (1936–1940)	John Nance Garner (1933–1941)	Franklin D. Roosevelt (1933–1945)
3		Francis Bowes Sayre Sr. (1885–1972)	October 28, 1939	October 12, 1942	Harry Hines Woodring (1936–1940)	John Nance Garner (1933–1941)	Franklin D. Roosevelt (1933–1945)
3		Francis Bowes Sayre Sr. (1885–1972)	October 28, 1939	October 12, 1942	Henry L. Stimson (1940–1945)	John Nance Garner (1933–1941)	Franklin D. Roosevelt (1933–1945)
3		Francis Bowes Sayre Sr. (1885–1972)	October 28, 1939	October 12, 1942	Henry L. Stimson (1940–1945)	Henry A. Wallace (1941–1945)	Franklin D. Roosevelt (1933–1945)
4		Harold L. Ickes (1874–1952)	October 12, 1942	September 14, 1945	Henry L. Stimson (1940–1945)	Henry A. Wallace (1941–1945)	Franklin D. Roosevelt (1933–1945)
4		Harold L. Ickes (1874–1952)	October 12, 1942	September 14, 1945	Henry L. Stimson (1940–1945)	Harry S. Truman (1945)	Franklin D. Roosevelt (1933–1945)
4		Harold L. Ickes (1874–1952)	October 12, 1942	September 14, 1945	Henry L. Stimson (1940–1945)	Vacant (Note: Truman succeeded to the presidency intra-term)	Harry S. Truman (1945–1953)
5		Paul V. McNutt (1891–1955)	September 14, 1945	July 4, 1946	Henry L. Stimson (1940–1945)	Vacant	Harry S. Truman (1945–1953)
5		Paul V. McNutt (1891–1955)	September 14, 1945	July 4, 1946	Robert P. Patterson (1945–1947)	Vacant	Harry S. Truman (1945–1953)

== Japanese military governors (1942–1945) ==
In December 1941, the Commonwealth of the Philippines was invaded by Imperial Japan as part of World War II. The next year, the Japanese sent a military governor to control the country during the wartime period, followed by the formal establishment of the puppet Second Philippine Republic under Jose P. Laurel.

On September 2, 1945, the position of Governor-General of the Philippines was abolished. The Philippines' independence from the United States was proclaimed by the Treaty of Manila on July 4, 1946, installing Manuel Roxas as the fifth President of the Philippines and ushering in the Third Philippine Republic.

No.	Portrait	Name	Tenure start	Tenure end	Minister of Colonial Affairs (Note: Depending ministry of the Japanese occupation of the Philippines)	Prime Minister	Emperor
1		Masaharu Homma (1887–1946)	January 3, 1942	June 8, 1942	HiroyaIno (1941–1942)	Hideki Tojo (1941–1944)	Hirohito (1926–1989)
2		Shizuichi Tanaka (1887–1945)	June 8, 1942	May 28, 1943	HiroyaIno (1941–1942)	Hideki Tojo (1941–1944)	Hirohito (1926–1989)
2		Shizuichi Tanaka (1887–1945)	June 8, 1942	May 28, 1943	Minister of Greater East Asia	Hideki Tojo (1941–1944)	Hirohito (1926–1989)
2		Shizuichi Tanaka (1887–1945)	June 8, 1942	May 28, 1943	Kazuo Aoki (1942–1944)	Hideki Tojo (1941–1944)	Hirohito (1926–1989)
3		Shigenori Kuroda (1887–1952)	May 28, 1943	September 26, 1944	Kazuo Aoki (1942–1944)	Hideki Tojo (1941–1944)	Hirohito (1926–1989)
3		Shigenori Kuroda (1887–1952)	May 28, 1943	September 26, 1944	Mamoru Shigemitsu (1944–1945)	Kuniaki Koiso (1944–1945)	Hirohito (1926–1989)
4		Tomoyuki Yamashita (1885–1946)	September 26, 1944	September 2, 1945	Mamoru Shigemitsu (1944–1945)	Kuniaki Koiso (1944–1945)	Hirohito (1926–1989)
4		Tomoyuki Yamashita (1885–1946)	September 26, 1944	September 2, 1945	Kantarō Suzuki (1945)	Kantarō Suzuki (1945)	Hirohito (1926–1989)
4		Tomoyuki Yamashita (1885–1946)	September 26, 1944	September 2, 1945	Shigenori Tōgō (1945)	Kantarō Suzuki (1945)	Hirohito (1926–1989)
4		Tomoyuki Yamashita (1885–1946)	September 26, 1944	September 2, 1945	Mamoru Shigemitsu (1945)	Prince Naruhiko Higashikuni(1945)	Hirohito (1926–1989)

== Vice-governors of the Philippines ==
On October 29, 1901, the position of Vice-Governor was created. The Vice-Governor was appointed by the President of the United States to act as the Governor-General (known at that time as the Civil Governor) in case of illness or temporary absence.

No.	Portrait	Name	Tenure start	Tenure end	Governor-General	Secretary of War	Vice President	President
1		Luke Edward Wright (1846–1922)	October 29, 1901	January 31, 1904	William Howard Taft (1901–1904)	Elihu Root (1899–1904)	Vacant	Theodore Roosevelt (1901–1909)
2		Henry Clay Ide (1844–1921)	February 1, 1904	March 30, 1906	Luke Edward Wright (1904–1905)	William Howard Taft (1904–1908)	Charles W. Fairbanks (1905–1909)	Theodore Roosevelt (1901–1909)
2		Henry Clay Ide (1844–1921)	February 1, 1904	March 30, 1906	Henry Clay Ide (1905–1906)	William Howard Taft (1904–1908)	Charles W. Fairbanks (1905–1909)	Theodore Roosevelt (1901–1909)
3		William Cameron Forbes (1870–1959)	July 31, 1908	November 10, 1909	James Francis Smith (1906–1909)	William Howard Taft (1904–1908)	Charles W. Fairbanks (1905–1909)	Theodore Roosevelt (1901–1909)
3		William Cameron Forbes (1870–1959)	July 31, 1908	November 10, 1909	James Francis Smith (1906–1909)	Luke Edward Wright (1908–1909)	Charles W. Fairbanks (1905–1909)	Theodore Roosevelt (1901–1909)
3		William Cameron Forbes (1870–1959)	July 31, 1908	November 10, 1909	James Francis Smith (1906–1909)	Jacob M. Dickinson (1909–1911)	James S. Sherman (1909–1912)	William Howard Taft (1909–1913)
4		Newton W. Gilbert (1862–1939)	February 14, 1910	November 30, 1913	William Cameron Forbes (1909–1913)	Jacob M. Dickinson (1909–1911)	James S. Sherman (1909–1912)	William Howard Taft (1909–1913)
4		Newton W. Gilbert (1862–1939)	February 14, 1910	November 30, 1913	William Cameron Forbes (1909–1913)	Henry L. Stimson (1911–1913)	James S. Sherman (1909–1912)	William Howard Taft (1909–1913)
4		Newton W. Gilbert (1862–1939)	February 14, 1910	November 30, 1913	William Cameron Forbes (1909–1913)	Henry L. Stimson (1911–1913)	Vacant	William Howard Taft (1909–1913)
4		Newton W. Gilbert (1862–1939)	February 14, 1910	November 30, 1913	William Cameron Forbes (1909–1913)	Lindley Miller Garrison (1913–1916)	Thomas R. Marshall (1913–1921)	Woodrow Wilson (1913–1921)
4		Newton W. Gilbert (1862–1939)	February 14, 1910	November 30, 1913	Newton W. Gilbert (1906); Interim	Lindley Miller Garrison (1913–1916)	Thomas R. Marshall (1913–1921)	Woodrow Wilson (1913–1921)
4		Newton W. Gilbert (1862–1939)	February 14, 1910	November 30, 1913	Francis Burton Harrison (1873–1957)	Lindley Miller Garrison (1913–1916)	Thomas R. Marshall (1913–1921)	Woodrow Wilson (1913–1921)
5		Henderson S. Martin	December 1, 1913	June 28, 1917	Francis Burton Harrison (1873–1957)	Lindley Miller Garrison (1913–1916)	Thomas R. Marshall (1913–1921)	Woodrow Wilson (1913–1921)
5		Henderson S. Martin	December 1, 1913	June 28, 1917	Francis Burton Harrison (1873–1957)	Newton D. Baker (1916–1921)	Thomas R. Marshall (1913–1921)	Woodrow Wilson (1913–1921)
6		Charles Yeater (1861–1943)	June 29, 1917	January 25, 1922	Francis Burton Harrison (1873–1957)	Newton D. Baker (1916–1921)	Thomas R. Marshall (1913–1921)	Woodrow Wilson (1913–1921)
6		Charles Yeater (1861–1943)	June 29, 1917	January 25, 1922	Charles Yeater (1921); Interim	John W. Weeks (1921–1925)	Calvin Coolidge (1921–1923)	Warren G. Harding (1921–1923)
6		Charles Yeater (1861–1943)	June 29, 1917	January 25, 1922	Leonard Wood (1921–1927)	John W. Weeks (1921–1925)	Calvin Coolidge (1921–1923)	Warren G. Harding (1921–1923)
7		Eugene Allen Gilmore (1871–1953)	January 26, 1922	June 20, 1930	Leonard Wood (1921–1927)	John W. Weeks (1921–1925)	Calvin Coolidge (1921–1923)	Warren G. Harding (1921–1923)
7		Eugene Allen Gilmore (1871–1953)	January 26, 1922	June 20, 1930	Leonard Wood (1921–1927)	John W. Weeks (1921–1925)	Vacant	Calvin Coolidge (1923–1929)
7		Eugene Allen Gilmore (1871–1953)	January 26, 1922	June 20, 1930	Leonard Wood (1921–1927)	John W. Weeks (1921–1925)	Charles G. Dawes (1925–1929)	Calvin Coolidge (1923–1929)
7		Eugene Allen Gilmore (1871–1953)	January 26, 1922	June 20, 1930	Leonard Wood (1921–1927)	Dwight F. Davis (1925–1929)	Charles G. Dawes (1925–1929)	Calvin Coolidge (1923–1929)
7		Eugene Allen Gilmore (1871–1953)	January 26, 1922	June 20, 1930	Eugene Allen Gilmore (1927); Interim	Dwight F. Davis (1925–1929)	Charles G. Dawes (1925–1929)	Calvin Coolidge (1923–1929)
7		Eugene Allen Gilmore (1871–1953)	January 26, 1922	June 20, 1930	Henry L. Stimson (1927–1929)	Dwight F. Davis (1925–1929)	Charles G. Dawes (1925–1929)	Calvin Coolidge (1923–1929)
7		Eugene Allen Gilmore (1871–1953)	January 26, 1922	June 20, 1930	Eugene Allen Gilmore (1929); Interim	Dwight F. Davis (1925–1929)	Charles G. Dawes (1925–1929)	Calvin Coolidge (1923–1929)
7		Eugene Allen Gilmore (1871–1953)	January 26, 1922	June 20, 1930	Eugene Allen Gilmore (1929); Interim	James W. Good (1929)	Charles Curtis (1929–1933)	Herbert Hoover (1929–1933)
7		Eugene Allen Gilmore (1871–1953)	January 26, 1922	June 20, 1930	Dwight F. Davis (1929–1932)	James W. Good (1929)	Charles Curtis (1929–1933)	Herbert Hoover (1929–1933)
7		Eugene Allen Gilmore (1871–1953)	January 26, 1922	June 20, 1930	Dwight F. Davis (1929–1932)	Patrick J. Hurley (1929–1933)	Charles Curtis (1929–1933)	Herbert Hoover (1929–1933)
–		Nicholas Roosevelt (1893–1982); Ad interim	July 29, 1930	September 24, 1930	Dwight F. Davis (1929–1932)	Patrick J. Hurley (1929–1933)	Charles Curtis (1929–1933)	Herbert Hoover (1929–1933)
8		George C. Butte (1877–1940)	December 31, 1930	June 30, 1932	Dwight F. Davis (1929–1932)	Patrick J. Hurley (1929–1933)	Charles Curtis (1929–1933)	Herbert Hoover (1929–1933)
8		George C. Butte (1877–1940)	December 31, 1930	June 30, 1932	George C. Butte (1932); Interim	Patrick J. Hurley (1929–1933)	Charles Curtis (1929–1933)	Herbert Hoover (1929–1933)
8		George C. Butte (1877–1940)	December 31, 1930	June 30, 1932	Theodore Roosevelt Jr. (1932–1933)	Patrick J. Hurley (1929–1933)	Charles Curtis (1929–1933)	Herbert Hoover (1929–1933)
9		John H. Holliday	August 13, 1932	September 1, 1933	Theodore Roosevelt Jr. (1932–1933)	Patrick J. Hurley (1929–1933)	Charles Curtis (1929–1933)	Herbert Hoover (1929–1933)
9		John H. Holliday	August 13, 1932	September 1, 1933	Theodore Roosevelt Jr. (1932–1933)	George Dern (1933–1936)	John Nance Garner (1933–1941)	Franklin D. Roosevelt (1933–1945)
10		Joseph R. Hayden (1887–1945)	November 7, 1933	November 15, 1935	Frank Murphy (1933–1935)	George Dern (1933–1936)	John Nance Garner (1933–1941)	Franklin D. Roosevelt (1933–1945)

== See also ==
- Filipino styles and honorifics
- List of sovereign state leaders in the Philippines
- List of recorded datu in the Philippines
- President of the Philippines
- List of presidents of the Philippines
- Audiencia
- List of Viceroys of New Spain
- Spanish Empire
- History of the Philippines
- Military History of the Philippines
- United States Territory
- Governor-General
- Lists of office-holders
- Gobernadorcillo
