= Governor of Negros Occidental =

Head of the provincial government

- Gobernador sang Probinsya sang Negros Occidental
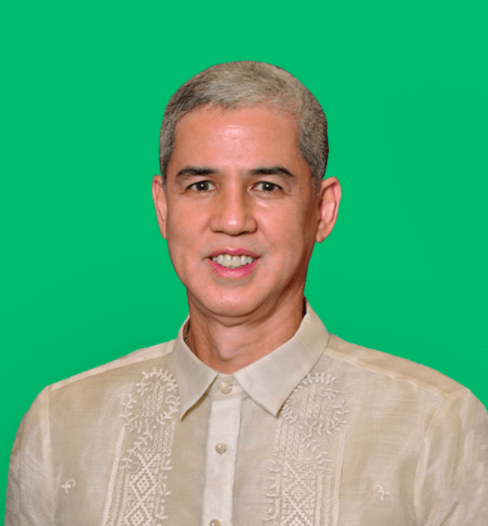
- Incumbent; Bong Lacson since June 30, 2019
- Style: The Honorable; His Excellency (formerly, Spanish era)
- Seat: Negros Occidental Provincial Capitol, Bacolod
- Term length: 3 years
- Inaugural holder: Pedro de Alcaraz (de facto, as Corregidor of Negros Island); Melecio Severino (de jure, as elected Governor of Negros Island)
- Formation: 1901
- Deputy: Vice Governor
- Website: negros-occ.gov.ph

The governor of Negros Occidental is the local chief executive and head of the Provincial Government of Negros Occidental. Along with the governor of Negros Oriental, the governor of Siquijor, and the mayor of the highly urbanized city of Bacolod, he serves as one of the chief executives of the Negros Island Region in the Philippines.

== Formation ==
Before independence, the position had been occupied by appointed Spanish military commanders that also serve the role of governor since the transfer of the capital to Bacolod in 1849. Previously, the local chief executive post was vested on the "Corregidor," or the commander of the military outpost, in the two previous capitals of Ilog, Negros Occidental and Himamaylan.

After the Negros Revolution, all provincial authority divested on the Office of the President and Vice President, representing Negros Occidental and Negros Oriental. Americans occupied the fledgling republic and requested the provisional government to conduct an island-wide election for the gubernatorial post. Melecio Severino of Silay emerged as the first elected governor.

== Line of succession ==
As with the president of the Philippines, the role of governor is passed on to the vice governor of Negros Occidental in case of incapacity, resignation or death. But unlike the national line of succession, the board member designated as the first in line for garnering the highest number of votes succeeds as vice governor, also the same should only the vice governor be incapacitated. Should both the governor and vice governor be incapacitated, the same would succeed as governor and the board member with the second highest number of votes would succeed as vice governor.

== Duties and related offices ==
By the convention set for the newly created Negros Island Region, the governor of Negros Occidental sits as chairperson of one of the two regional councils, namely the Regional Development Council and the Regional Peace and Order Council. Currently, the governor of Negros Occidental is Eugenio Jose "Bong" Lacson.

A spouse of the governor of Negros Occidental is accorded the title of "First Lady," but alternatively called "Gubernatorial First Lady" or "Provincial First Lady," as not to confuse with the office of the First Lady of the Philippines. Unlike the First Lady of the Philippines, the Provincial First Lady is not accorded a formal ceremonial role, but rather conventionally represents the governor in the social activities of the province.

== List of governors ==
=== Spanish governors of Negros province ===
From the formal establishment of the military outpost in the pueblo of Ilog until the promulgation of a royal decree dividing the island into Negros Occidental and Negros Oriental on October 25, 1889, Negros Island was governed as a single province starting from being under the jurisdiction of Oton, Iloilo until it established its capitals in Ilog (1734), Himamaylan (1795) and Bacolod (1849).

Order	Name	Year in office	Title	Capital	Governor-general
1	Pedro de Alcaraz	1625-1627	Corregidor	Ilog (de facto); Administered from Arevalo	Fernándo de Silva
2	Jeronimo Benegas	1627-1629	Corregidor	Ilog (de facto); Administered from Arevalo	Juan Niño de Tabora
3	Juan de Leon	1629-1631	Corregidor	Ilog (de facto); Administered from Arevalo	Juan Niño de Tabora
--	--	1631-1652	Direct administration by the Alcalde Mayor of Iloilo	Ilog (de facto); Administered from Arevalo	Juan Niño de Tabora; Lorenzo de Olaza; Juan Cerezo de Salamanca; Sebastián Hurtado de Corcuera; Diego Fajardo Chacón
4	Juan Ferrer	1652-1666	Corregidor	Ilog (de facto); Administered from Arevalo	Diego Fajardo Chacón; Sabiniano Manrique de Lara; Diego de Salcedo
5	Pedro de Tortosa	1666-1668	Corregidor	Ilog (de facto); Administered from Arevalo	Diego de Salcedo
6	Jacinto Rivera	1668-1669	Corregidor	Ilog (de facto); Administered from Arevalo	Juan Manuel de la Peña Bonifaz
7	Nicolas Jurado	1669-1671	Corregidor	Ilog (de facto); Administered from Arevalo	Manuel de León
8	Agustin Martinez	1671-1673	Corregidor	Ilog (de facto); Administered from Arevalo	Manuel de León
--	--	1673-1699	Direct administration by the Alcalde Mayor of Iloilo	Ilog (de facto); Administered from Arevalo	Manuel de León; Francisco Coloma; Francisco Sotomayor y Mansilla; Juan de Vargas y Hurtado; Gabriel de Curuzealegui y Arriola; Alonso de Avila Fuertes; Fausto Cruzat y Gongora
9	Francisco Tabares	1699-1701	Corregidor	Ilog (de facto); Administered from Arevalo	Fausto Cruzat y Gongora
10	Ramon Diaz Ruizbobo	1701-1703	Corregidor	Ilog (de facto); Administered from Arevalo	Domingo Zabálburu de Echevarri
11	Felix de Cabrera	1703-1705	Corregidor	Ilog (de facto); Administered from Arevalo	Domingo Zabálburu de Echevarri
--	--	1705-1709	Direct administration by the Alcalde Mayor of Iloilo	Ilog (de facto); Administered from Arevalo	Domingo Zabálburu de Echevarri
12	Francisco de Figueroa	1709-1711	Corregidor	Ilog (de facto); Administered from Arevalo	Martín de Urzúa y Arizmendi
13	Bartolome Gallardo	1711-1714	Corregidor	Ilog (de facto); Administered from Arevalo	Martín de Urzúa y Arizmendi
14	Ricardo Ricarte	1714- 1716	Corregidor	Ilog (de facto); Administered from Arevalo	Martín de Urzúa y Arizmendi; José Torralba
15	Juan Bautista de Sameta	1716-1718	Corregidor	Ilog (de facto); Administered from Arevalo	Fernando Manuel de Bustillo Bustamante y Rueda
--	--	1718-1719	Direct administration by the Alcalde Mayor of Iloilo	Ilog (de facto); Administered from Arevalo	Fernando Manuel de Bustillo Bustamante y Rueda
16	Fernando de Rojas	1719-1721	Corregidor	Ilog (de facto); Administered from Arevalo	Francisco de la Cuesta
17	--	1721-1779	Direct administration by the Alcalde Mayor of Iloilo	Ilog (de jure); Administered from Arevalo	Francisco de la Cuesta; Toribio José Cosio y Campo; Fernándo Valdés y Tamon; Gaspar de la Torre; Juan Arrechederra; Francisco José de Ovando; Pedro Manuel de Arandía Santisteban; Miguel Lino de Ezpeleta; Manuel Rojo del Río y Vieyra; Simón de Anda y Salazar(first); Dawsonne Drake (British Occupation); Francisco Javier de la Torre; José Antonio Raón y Gutiérrez; Simón de Anda y Salazar(second); Pedro de Sarrio; José Basco y Vargas
18	Felipe de Zuñiga	1779-1785 (first); 1789-1790 (second)	Corregidor	Ilog	José Basco y Vargas
19	Mariano Escote	1785-1787	Corregidor	Ilog	José Basco y Vargas
20	Vicente Escote	1787-1789	Corregidor	Ilog	Pedro de Sarrio; Félix Berenguer de Marquina
22	Jose de Arriola	1790- 1793	Corregidor	Ilog	Félix Berenguer de Marquina
23	Ramon de Zuñiga	1793-1799	Corregidor	Himamaylan	Rafael María de Aguilar y Ponce de León
24	Jose Casteu	1799-1803	Corregidor	Himamaylan	Rafael María de Aguilar y Ponce de León
25	Simon Matias de Rojas	1803-1806	Corregidor	Himamaylan	Rafael María de Aguilar y Ponce de León
26	Carlos Casares	1806-1810	Corregidor	Himamaylan	Mariano Fernández de Folgueras
27	Ciriaco Lladoc	1810-1814 (first); 1818-1821 (second)	Corregidor	Himamaylan	Manuel Gonzalez de Aguilar(first); Mariano Fernández de Folgueras(second)
28	Jose Maria de Torres	1814-1818	Corregidor	Himamaylan	José Gardoqui Jaraveitia
30	Fernando Cuervo	1821-1824	Corregidor	Himamaylan	Mariano Fernández de Folgueras; Juan Antonio Martínez
31	Camilo Peña	1824-1827	Corregidor	Himamaylan	Juan Antonio Martínez; Mariano Ricafort Palacín y Abarca
--	--	1827-1829	Direct administration by the Spanish governor of Iloilo	Himamaylan	Mariano Ricafort Palacín y Abarca
32	Juan de Cordova	1829-1833	Corregidor	Himamaylan	Mariano Ricafort Palacín y Abarca; Pasqual Enrile y Alcedo
33	Luis Villasis	1833-1839	Corregidor	Himamaylan	Pasqual Enrile y Alcedo; Gabriel de Torres; Joaquín de Crámer; Pedro Antonio Salazar Castillo y Varona; Andrés García Camba; Luis Lardizábal
34	Mariano Valero y Soto	1839- 1842	Alcalde Mayor	Himamaylan	Luis Lardizábal; Marcelino de Oraá Lecumberri
35	Jose Saenz de Vizmanos	1842- 1848	Alcalde Mayor	Himamaylan	Marcelino de Oraá Lecumberri; Francisco de Paula Alcalá de la Torre; Narciso Clavería
36	Manuel Valdivieso Morquecho	1848-1855	Alcalde Mayor	Bacolod	Narciso Clavería; Antonio María Blanco; Antonio de Urbistondo y Eguía; Ramón Montero y Blandino; Manuel Pavía; Ramón Montero y Blandino; Manuel Crespo y Cebrían
37	Emilio Saravia	1855-1857	Gobernador Politico-Militar	Bacolod	Manuel Crespo y Cebrían; Ramón Montero y Blandino
38	Pedro de Beaumont	1857-1860	Gobernador Politico-Militar	Bacolod	Fernándo Norzagaray y Escudero
39	Beremundo Aranda	1860-1864	Gobernador Politico-Militar	Bacolod	Ramón María Solano y Llanderal; Juan Herrera Dávila; José Lemery e Ibarrola Ney y González; Salvador Valdés; Rafaél de Echagüe y Bermingham
40	Jose de Crame	1864-1865	Gobernador Politico-Militar	Bacolod	Rafaél de Echagüe y Bermingham
41	Joaquin Vidal	1865- 1866	Gobernador Politico-Militar	Bacolod	Joaquín del Solar e Ibáñez (first); Juan de Lara e Irigoyen
42	Juan Gil y Montes	1866-1867	Gobernador Politico-Militar	Bacolod	José Laureano de Sanz y Posse; Juan Antonio Osorio; Joaquín del Solar e Ibáñez(second); José de la Gándara y Navarro
43	Antonio Vasquez Cuenca	1867	Gobernador Politico-Militar (Interim)	Bacolod	José de la Gándara y Navarro
44	Eugenio Serrano	1867-1868	Gobernador Politico-Militar	Bacolod	José de la Gándara y Navarro
45	Enrique Fajardo	1868-1869	Gobernador Politico-Militar	Bacolod	José de la Gándara y Navarro
46	Francisco Jaudenes	1869- 1871	Gobernador Politico-Militar	Bacolod	Manuel Maldonado (Republican governor general); Carlos María de la Torre y Navacerrada (Republican governor general)
47	Domingo Garcia	1871-1873	Gobernador Politico-Militar	Bacolod	Rafael de Izquierdo y Gutíerrez
48	Miguel Masgrao	1873	Gobernador Politico-Militar (Interim)	Bacolod	Rafael de Izquierdo y Gutíerrez
49	Federico Lemeyer	1873-1875	Gobernador Politico-Militar	Bacolod	Juan Alaminos y Vivar; Manuel Blanco Valderrama; José Malcampo y Monje
51	Roman Pastor	1875-1877	Gobernador Politico-Militar	Bacolod	José Malcampo y Monje
52	Juan Blake	1877-1878	Gobernador Politico-Militar	Bacolod	Domingo Moriones y Murillo
53	Ramon Estevanez	1878-1883	Gobernador Politico-Militar	Bacolod	Domingo Moriones y Murillo; Rafael Rodríguez Arias; Fernando Primo de Rivera
54	Eduardo Subinza	1883-1885	Gobernador Politico-Militar	Bacolod	Emilio Molíns; Joaquín Jovellar
55	Antonio Tovar	1885-1889	Gobernador Politico-Militar	Bacolod	Emilio Terrero y Perinat
56	Fernando Giralt	1889-1890	Gobernador Politico-Militar	Bacolod	Emilio Terrero y Perinat; Antonio Moltó; Federico Lobatón; Valeriano Wéyler

=== Spanish governors of Negros Occidental ===
Governor General Valeriano Wéyler promulgated a royal decree on October 25, 1889, which divided the island into two provinces, namely Negros Occidental and Negros Oriental, upon the request of the 13 Augustinian Recollect friars administering the towns east of the island. Bacolod was retained as the capital of Negros Occidental.

Order	Name	Year in office	Title	Capital	Governor-general
1	Camilo Lasala	1890-1894	Gobernador Politico-Militar	Bacolod	Valeriano Wéyler; Eulogio Despujol; Federico Ochando; Ramón Blanco, 1st Marquis of Peña Plata
2	Manuel Valdeviseo Morquecho	1894-1898	Gobernador Politico-Militar	Bacolod	Ramón Blanco, 1st Marquis of Peña Plata; Camilo de Polavieja; José de Lachambre; Fernando Primo de Rivera
3	Isidro Castro y Cinceros	1898	Gobernador Politico-Militar	Bacolod	Fernando Primo de Rivera; Basilio Augustín; Fermín Jáudenes; Francisco Rizzo; Diego de los Ríos

=== Revolutionary government ===
Order	Name	Year in office	Title	Capital	President
1	General Juan Araneta	November 6, 1898 – November 27, 1898	Gobernador Militar (Acting, as Secretary of War)	Bacolod	General Aniceto Lacson
2	Simon Lizares	November 27, 1898 – December 1, 1899	Gobernador Civil (Acting, as Secretary of the Interior)	Bacolod	General Aniceto Lacson

=== Filipino governors ===
This list includes governors appointed or elected since the end of Spanish rule, the recognized start of the institutional office.

Order	Image	Name	Place of origin	Year in office	Era	Vice governor
1		Melecio Severino	Silay	December 1, 1899 – April 30, 1901	Republic of Negros (as Governor-General of Negros Island)	Antonio Jayme
2		Jose Ruiz de Luzuriaga	Bacolod	May 1, 1901 – August 15, 1901	American Occupation, appointed	Leandro de la Rama Locsin
3		Leandro de la Rama Locsin	Bago	August 16, 1901 – March 6, 1904 (first); September 26, 1907 – March 7, 1908 (second)	American Occupation, appointed Insular Government, elected	
4		Antonio Ledesma Jayme	Bacolod	March 7, 1904 – May 8, 1906	Insular Government	
5		Manuel Lopez	Silay	May 9, 1906 – September 25, 1907	Insular Government	
6		Mariano Yulo	Bago	March 8, 1908 – October 15, 1912	Insular Government	
8		Matias Hilado	Bacolod	October 16, 1912 – October 15, 1922	Insular Government	
9		Gil Montilla	Sipalay	October 16, 1922 – October 15, 1925	Insular Government	
10		José Locsin	Silay	October 16, 1925 – October 15, 1928	Insular Government	
11		Agustin Ramos	Himamaylan	October 16, 1928 – October 15, 1931	Insular Government	
12		Isaac Lacson	Talisay	October 16, 1931 – July 12, 1934	Insular Government	
13		Ramon Severino	Silay	July 12, 1934 – October 13, 1934	Insular Government	
14		Emilio Gaston	Silay	October 16, 1934 – June 13, 1937	Insular Government; Commonwealth Government	
15		Valeriano Gatuslao	Himamaylan	June 15, 1937 – October 15, 1940 (first); February 3, 1954 – January 16, 1965 (second)	Commonwealth Government; Third Republic	Gloria Esteban (second)
16		Ramon Torres	Bago	October 16, 1940 – December 30, 1941 (first); June 8, 1953 – September 12, 1953 (second)	Commonwealth Government; Third Republic	
17		Antonio Lizares	Talisay	January 1, 1942 – July 31, 1942	Commonwealth Government	
18		Vicente Gustilo	Cadiz	August 1, 1942-April 1943	Japanese Occupation	
19		Alfredo Montelibano Sr.	Murcia	December 16, 1942 – August 16, 1945	Commonwealth Government (In Exile) (as military governor of Negros and Siquijor Islands)	Post delegated to 7 deputy governors: Roberto Llantada; Traquilino Valderrama; Salvador Benedicto; Miguel Gatuslao; Aurelio Locsin; Margarito P. Teves; Crispimano Limbaga
20		Gregorio Pura	Bacolod	September 27, 1945 – October 19, 1945	Commonwealth Government (as military governor)	
21		Ildefonso Coscolluela	Silay	October 20, 1945 – February 14, 1946	Commonwealth Government (as military governor)	
22		Miguel Gatuslao	Himamaylan	February 15, 1946 – June 6, 1946	Commonwealth Government (as military governor)	
23		Rafael Lacson	Talisay	June 7, 1946 – November 22, 1951	Commonwealth Government; Third Republic	Felix Amante
24		Leon Miraflores	Bacolod	November 23, 1951 – July 9, 1952 (first); September 1, 1952 – June 7, 1953 (second); January 7, 1954 – January 9, 1954 (third)	Third Republic	
25		Fernando Fuentes	Bacolod	July 10, 1952 – August 31, 1952	Third Republic	
29		Felix Amante	Bacolod	September 16, 1953 – January 6, 1954	Third Republic	
31		Deogracias Estrella	Bacolod	January 9, 1954 – February 2, 1954	Third Republic	
33		Benjamin Gomez	Silay	January 17, 1965 – December 31, 1967	Third Republic	
34		Alfredo Montelibano Jr.	Bacolod	January 1, 1968 – April 4, 1986	Third Republic; Fourth Republic	
--		Armando Gustilo	Cadiz	January 3, 1986 – April 4, 1986	Fourth Republic (as Governor of Negros del Norte)	Pacifico Aranas
--		Jose Puey Jr.	Cadiz	April 5, 1986 – August 18, 1986	Fourth Republic (as Governor of Negros del Norte, office dissolved)	Romeo Gamboa Jr.
35		Daniel Lacson Jr.	Saravia	April 5, 1986 – December 4, 1987 (first); January 24, 1988 – June 25, 1992 (second)	Fourth Republic; Fifth Republic	Eduardo Ledesma (first); Rafael Coscolluela (second)
36		Eduardo Ledesma	Silay	December 5, 1987 – February 1, 1988	Fifth Republic	Lorendo Dilag
38		Rafael Coscolluela	Talisay	June 30, 1992 – June 30, 2001	Fifth Republic	Romeo Gamboa Jr.
39		Joseph Marañon	Sagay	June 30, 2001 – May 14, 2008	Fifth Republic	Isidro Zayco
40		Isidro Zayco	Kabankalan	May 14, 2008 – June 30, 2010	Fifth Republic	Emilio Yulo III
41		Alfredo Marañon	Sagay	June 30, 2010 – June 30, 2019	Fifth Republic	Genaro Alvarez (first); Bong Lacson (second)
42		Bong Lacson	San Carlos	June 30, 2019 – incumbent	Fifth Republic	Jeffrey Ferrer (first); Jose Benito Alonso (incumbent)
