= José Antonio Raón y Gutiérrez =

50th Governor-General of the Philippines
- In office 6 July 1765 – July 1770
- Monarch: Charles III of Spain
- Governor: (Viceroy of New Spain); Joaquín de Montserrat, 1st Marquess of Cruillas; Carlos Francisco de Croix, 1st Marquess of Croix
- Preceded by: Francisco Javier de la Torre
- Succeeded by: Simón de Anda y Salazar

Royal Governor of Panama (interim)
- In office 1761–1762
- Monarch: Charles III of Spain
- Preceded by: Antonio de Guill y Gonzaga
- Succeeded by: José de Arana y Górnica

Personal details
- Born: c. 1700 Calahorra, La Rioja Spain
- Died: 4 January 1773 Manila, Captaincy General of the Philippines
- Spouse: Josefa Mondragón
- Children: José Raón; Josefa Delgado y Amate

Military service
- Allegiance: Spain
- Branch/service: Spanish Army
- Rank: Brigadier general

José Antonio Raón y Gutiérrez (c. 1700 – 4 January 1773) was a Spanish general who served as Royal Governor of Panama, and the 50th Governor-General of the Philippines. He is known as an able administrator despite being perceived as corrupt.

== Early life and career ==
There is not much known about the early career of Raón other than that he was from Calahorra and that he was born around 1700. However, there is documentary evidence which suggests that he was married to Josefa Mondragon. They had two children: José Raón, a lieutenant, and Josefa Delgado y Amate. In 1761, he was appointed as interim Royal Governor of Panama, the first appointment made by Charles III of Spain in the colonial administrative district. Before his appointment, he served as a brigadier general in the Spanish Army.

== Governor General of the Philippines ==
Only 6 July 1765, Raón arrived in the Philippines, coincidental with the arrival of the ship Buen Consejo, which went around the Cape of Good Hope. The Buen Consejo was the first Spanish ship to travel through the area since the Dutch took over in 1652. He was responsible for the expulsion of Jesuits in the Philippines, pursuant to the royal decree made by Charles III of Spain in 1767, as well as revising the "Ordinances of Good Government" in 1768, a document drafted by former Governor-General Pedro Manuel de Arandía Santisteban. The delay in the arrival of the decree, which was received in the Philippines by 1768, allowed the Jesuit priests to hide all of their possessions and destroy documents that could be held against them, which were supposed to be confiscated. It was said that Raón warned the Jesuits beforehand in exchange of a large amount of money. The first batch of Jesuits, numbered 64, left Manila only by May 17, 1768. Between 1769 and 1771 the Jesuits in the Philippines were transported to Spain and from there deported to Italy. The lack of Jesuits in Spain and the colonies prompted José Moñino, 1st Count of Floridablanca, the reformist chief minister of Charles III of Spain, to undertake a program of hiring new teachers and modernizing the Spanish educational system. In the Philippines, this meant that every village or barrio was allocated a school and a teacher. The implementation of these reforms expanded the reach of basic education in the archipelago. Meanwhile, in his attempt to bring peace to the archipelago, he offered amnesty to Francisco Dagohoy, who was leading the Dagohoy Rebellion in Bohol since 1744. However, the offer was turned down.

The British invasion of Manila encouraged Moro raiders to attack Mariveles, Bataan, a town in the Manila Bay area. During the invasion, Sultan Azim ud-Din I of Sulu was reinstated by the British, and the attack was part of the sultan's revenge on the Spaniards. In response to this, Raón launched a military campaign against the raiders. However, lack of resources dampened Raón's resistance. Meanwhile, the Chinese were ordered to be exiled following a royal decree in 1766. This was in response to the collaboration of a number of Chinese during the British invasion. However, he chose not to implement the decree in full measure, and Chinese and other foreign vessels continued to anchor in Manila Bay. At this time, French astronomer Guillaume Le Gentil visited the Philippines. He observed that Raón received "presents" from the respective captains of the vessels, which Raón himself displayed to the French astronomer. This elevated the perception of corruption during the Raón administration. It was also during Le Gentil's visit in 1766 when a powerful storm struck Manila. Raón wrote that this storm "brought great misery to the people."

== Death ==
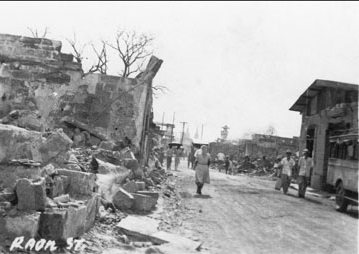
Raón Street in 1945

In 1770, the Real Audiencia sent Simón de Anda y Salazar to assume Raón's position. Anda arrived in July of the same year to succeed as Governor-General. The subsequent investigation (residencia) into Raón and three other associates, namely Francisco Henriquez de Villacorta, Domingo Blas de Basaraz (special commissioner for the expulsion of Jesuits), and Juan Antonio Cosio (Raón's secretary), was one of Anda's first acts as the new governor. The first two were members of the Real Audiencia of Manila, while the last one was Raón's secretary. The investigation went for almost three years, but he was never convicted and Raón died in Manila on 4 January 1773 before the investigation could be finalized. Raón Street in Manila was named in his honor. Later on, it was renamed as Gonzalo Puyat Street. The namesake was a Filipino industrialist and father of former Senator Gil Puyat.

Preceded by Francisco Javier de la Torre	Governor General of the Philippines; 1765–1770	Succeeded by Simón de Anda y Salazar
