= Francisco Javier de la Torre =

Spanish military personnel

49th Governor-General of the Philippines
- In office March 17, 1764 – July 6, 1765
- Preceded by: Simón de Anda y Salazar
- Succeeded by: José Antonio Raón y Gutiérrez

Francisco Javier de la Torre was the 49th governor-general of the Philippines from 1764 to 1765.

== Governorship ==
On January 30, 1764, prior to the death of Governor-General Manuel Rojo del Rio y Vieyra, Simón de Anda y Salazar assumed office as the acting governor. On March 16, 1764, Francisco Javier de la Torre arrived at Marinduque riding on a Spanish frigate Santa Rosa. In March 1764, acting governor Anda formally handed over his command to de la Torra making the latter as the new governor-general.

The first official act of de la Torre was to preside over Anda's residencia. In this judicial investigation it was found out that the finances of the colony was faithfully and honestly administered by Anda during the war years.

De la Torre was able to begin the work of reconstruction in the war-devastated colony immediately. During his brief tenure of one year, he exerted all efforts to heal the wounds of war and to bring back the economic and social affairs of the colony.

Political offices
Preceded by Simón de Anda y Salazar	Governor-General of the Philippines; 1764–1765	Succeeded by José Antonio Raón y Gutiérrez
