= Miguel Lino de Ezpeleta =

Spanish criollo bishop

- Bishop of Cebu
- Church: Roman Catholic
- See: Cebu
- Appointed: July 18, 1757
- Term ended: 1771
- Predecessor: Protacio Cabezas
- Successor: Mateo Joaquin Rubio de Arevalo

Orders
- Ordination: 1758
- Consecration: January 29, 1748 by Manuel de Matos

Personal details
- Born: 1701 Manila, Captaincy General of the Philippines
- Died: 1771 (aged 69–70) Cebu, Captaincy General of the Philippines

45th Governor and Captain-General of the Philippines
- In office June 1759 – July 1761
- Monarchs: Ferdinand VI of Spain; Charles III of Spain
- Preceded by: Pedro Manuel de Arandía Santisteban
- Succeeded by: Manuel Rojo del Rio y Vieyra

Miguel Lino de Ezpeleta (sometimes spelled as de Espeleta; June 1701 in Manila – July 1771 in Cebu) was a Spanish criollo born in Manila who served as the Bishop of Cebu from 1757 until his death in 1771. Consequently, he assumed the position as the governor-general from 1759 to 1761 during Spanish intervention to the Seven Years' War and prelude to the occupations of Manila and Cavite.

== Life and succession ==
Miguel Lino de Ezpeleta was born in Manila in 1701. Though he was born to Spanish parents, he was often considered a Filipino rather than a Criollo. During Spanish colonial days, a criollo was a natural Spaniard born in the colonies.

On July 18, 1757, he was appointed as the bishop of the Diocese of Cebu (now an archdiocese) and about a year later, he was ordained by the Archbishop of Nueva Cáceres Manuel de Matos to the bishopric.

Upon the death of Governor-General Pedro Manuel de Arandía Santisteban in 1759, the See of Manila and the See of Nueva Segovia were vacant, and de Ezpeleta as the Bishop of Cebu was the senior prelate of the islands. He assumed the post of governor against the will of the Real Audiencia of Manila.

On July 22, 1759, the new Archbishop of Manila Manuel Rojo del Rio y Vieyra arrived in the country which made the occupation of de Ezpeleta to the gubernatorial seat void. De Ezpeleta refused to step down as governor after Rojo's orders. De Ezpeleta sought the support from the oidores of the Audiencia: two of the four oidores went to the side of de Ezpeleta while the other to Rojo. De Ezpeleta also raised the precedent of Juan Arrechedera, who previously had the same instance as him. They brought the question to the Council of the Indies through its prosecutor Francisco Léandro de Viana.

== Administration ==
One of his initial actions against the previous administration of Arandía and the Real Audiencia was to revoke the reforms and decrees written by the ex-governor.

Later in 1759, he suppressed the armada of Fr. José Ducós, which was commissioned by Arandía to protect the Jesuit missionaries converting Muslims in Iligan Bay. One of the reasons of this suppression is that the Augustinian missionaries in Caraga and Butuan filed a complaint to de Ezpeleta that they are not well protected. Spanish historian and biographer José Montero y Vidal pointed out that this suppression greatly accelerated the depredations caused by Muslim pirates in Luzon and Visayas.

Much of de Ezpeleta's administration was occupied by the prosecution of don Santiago Orendaín, former adviser of governor Arandía who was held responsible for the repression of the church. Orendaín sought refuge in an Augustinian convent but was later seized and imprisoned in Fort Santiago.

In July 1761, a royal decree from Charles III of Spain coming from Madrid ordered the stepping down of de Ezpeleta. He then gave the administration of the colony to Archbishop Rojo.

Political offices
Preceded by Pedro Manuel de Arandía Santisteban	Governor and Captain-General of the Philippines; 1759–1761	Succeeded by Manuel Rojo del Rio y Vieyra
Catholic Church titles
Preceded by Protacio Cabezas	Bishop of Cebu; 1757–1771	Succeeded by Mateo Joaquin Rubio de Arevalo
