= Royal Governor of Panama =

Wikimedia article list

The royal governor of Panama ruled over the Spanish colonial administrative district known first as the colony of Darién and later as the colony of Castilla de Oro (part of Spanish colony of Peru), which in 1529 was renamed Panamá. This district was subordinated to the Viceroyalty of New Granada on August 20, 1739. There were 113 such governors or presidents during the Spanish conquest and the later periods of Spanish-centered colonialism.

== Governors of Darien ==
=== Appointed by Charles I ===
- Diego de Nicuesa: (June 1508 – 1511)
- Vasco Núñez de Balboa: (1511–1513)

== Charles I ==
=== Appointed by Charles I ===
- Pedrarias Dávila: (1513–1520)
- Lope de Sosa: (1520)
- Pedrarias Dávila: (1520–1526)
- Pedro de los Ríos y Gutiérrez de Aguayo: (1526–1529)

== Governors of Panamá ==
=== Appointed by Charles I ===
- Antonio de la Gama: (1529–1532)
- Francisco Barrionuevo: (1533–1536)
- Pascual de Andagoya: (1536)
- Pedro Vázquez de Acuña: (1536–1539)

The Real Audiencia governed between 1539 and 1543

- Pedro Ramírez de Quiñones: (1543–1545)
- Diego de Herrera: (1545)
- Hernando de Bichacao: (1545–1546)
- Pedro de Rivero: (1546)
- Pedro Antonio de Hinojosa: (1546)
- Pedro de la Gasca: (1546)
- Alonso de Álvarez: (1546–1548)
- Pedro Ramírez de Quiñones: (1548)
- Juan Barba de Vallecillo: (1549–1550)
- Sancho de Clavijo: (1550–1553)
- Álvaro de Sosa: (1553–1556)
- Juan Ruiz de Monjarás: (1557–1559)

=== Appointed by Philip II ===
- Rafael de Figueroa: (1559–1561)
- Luis de Guzmán: (1561–1563)
- Juan Busto de Villegas: (1563) (did not serve)
- Lope García de Castro: (1563–1564)
- Manuel Barros de San Millán: (1565–1566)
- Alonso Arias de Herrera y Maldonado: (1566)
- Juan de Pinedo: (1566)
- Manuel Barros de San Millán: (1567–1569)
- Diego Lope de Vera: (1569–1573)
- Gabriel Loarte: (1573–1578)
- Juan López de Cepeda: (1578) (interim)
- Pedro Ramírez de Quiñones: (1578–1585)
- Juan del Barrio Sepúlveda: (1585–1587)
- Francisco de Cárdenas: (1587–1596)
- Juan del Barrio Sepúlveda : (1596) (interim)
- Alonso de Sotomayor y Valmediano: (1596–1602)

=== Appointed by Philip III ===
- Hernando de Añazco: (1602–1604)
- Francisco Valverde de Mercado: (1605–1614)
- Francisco Manso de Contreras: (1614–1616)
- Diego Fernández de Velasco (governor): (1616–1619)
- Juan de la Cruz Rivadeneira: (1619–1621)
- Roque Chávez: (1621)

=== Appointed by Philip IV ===
- Rodrigo Vivero y Velasco: (1621–1627)
- Juan de Colmenares Andrade: (1627) (did not serve)
- Francisco Brienda y Cárdenas: (1627) (declined office)
- Álvaro de Quiñones Osorio y Miranda: (1627–1632)
- Sebastián Hurtado de Corcuera y Gaviría: (1632–1634)
- Enrique Enríquez de Sotomayor: (1634–1638)
- Andrés Garabito de León: (1638) (interim)
- Iñigo de la Motta Sarmiento: (1638–1642)
- Juan de la Vega y Bazán: (1643–1646)
- Juan Fernández de Córdoba y Coalla, Marquis of Miranda de Auta: (1646–1649)
- Juan Barba Vallecillo: (1649–1650)
- Juan de Bitrián Navarra y Biamonte: (1650–1651) (interim)
- Diego de Orozco: (1651) (interim)
- Francisco de Guzmán de Toledo: (1651–1652) (interim)
- Sebastián Hurtado de Corcuera y Gaviría: (1651) (declined office)
- Francisco Herrera y Henríquez: (1651) (declined office)
- Pedro Carrilla de Guzmán: (1652–1657)
- Fernando Ibáñez de la Riva-Agüero y Setien: (1658–1663)
- Pablo Figueroa: (1663–1665)

=== Appointed by Charles II ===
- Juan Pérez de Guzmán y Gonzaga: (1665–1667)
- Agustín de Bracamonte: (1667–1669)
- Diego de Ibarra: (1669) (interim)
- Juan Pérez de Guzmán y Gonzaga: (1669–1671)
- Diego de Ibarra: (1671) (interim, declined office)

The Real Audiencia governed until the designation of a new governor
- Luis Losada Quinoñes: (1671) (magistrate)
- Andres Martínez de Amileta: (1671) (magistrate)

- Francisco Miguel de Marichalar: (1671)
- Antonio Fernández de Córdoba y Mendoza: (1671–1673)
- Antonio Calderón de León, Bishop of Panamá: (1673–1675)
- Francisco Miguel de Marichalar: (1675–1676)
- Alonso Mercado de Villacorta: (1676–1681)
- Lucas Fernández de Piedrahita, Bishop of Panamá: (1681–1682)
- José Alzamora: (1682)
- Pedro Ponte de Llorena Hoyo y Calderón, Count of Palmar: (1682–1690)
- Pedro José de Guzmán Dávalos, Marquis of Mina: (1690–1695)
- Diego Ladrón de Guevara Orozco y Calderón, Bishop of Panamá: (1695–1696)
- Pedro Luis Henríquez de Guzmán, Count of Canillas: (1696–1699)
- José Antonio de la Rocha y Carranza, Marquis of Villarocha: (1699)
- Pedro Luis Henríquez de Guzmán, Count of Canillas: (1699–1702)

=== Appointed by Philip V ===
- Fernando Dávila Bravo de Laguna: (1702–1706)
- José Eustaquio Vicentelo Toledo y Luca: (1706)
- José Antonio de la Rocha y Carranza, Marquis of Villarocha: (1706–1708)
- Fernando Haro de Monterroso: (1708–1709)
- Juan Bautista de Ureta e Irusta: (1709–1710)
- José de Larrañeta y Vera: (1710–1711)
- José Antonio de la Rocha y Carranza, Marquis of Villarocha: (1711)
- José Hurtado de Amézaga: (1711–1718)
- Juan José Llamas y Rivas, Bishop of Panamá: (1718)
- Jerónimo Vadillo: (1718–1723)
- Gaspar Pérez Buelta: (1723–1724)
- José Alzamora y Ursino: (1724) (interim)
- Manuel de Alderete: (1724–1730)
- Juan José Andía Vivero y Velásco, Marquis of Villa Hermosa: (1730–1735)
- Dionisio Martínez de la Vega: (1735–1743)
- Dionisio de Alcedo Ugarte y Herrera: (1743–1749)

=== Appointed by Ferdinand VI ===
- Manuel de Montiano y Luyando: (1749–1758)
- Antonio de Guill y Gonzaga: (1758–1761)

=== Appointed by Charles III ===
- José Antonio Raón y Gutiérrez: (1761–1762) (interim)
- José de Arana y Górnica: (1762–1764) (interim)
- José Blasco de Orozco: (1764 – July 1767)
- Joaquín Cabrejo: (1767) (interim)
- Manuel de Agreda: (1767–1768) (interim)
- Nicolás de Castro: (1768–1769)
- Vicente de Olaciregui: (December 1769 – June 1772)
- Nicolás de Castro: (1772) (interim)
- Nicolás Quijano: (1773 – May 1774)
- Francisco Navas: (1774) (interim)
- Pedro Carbonell Pinto Vigo y Correa: (1774 – November 1779)
- Ramón de Carvajal: (November 1779 – 1785)
- José Dómas y Valle: (1785–1793)

=== Appointed by Charles IV ===
- Antonio Narváez y la Torre: (1793–1803)
- Juan de Marcos Urbina: (1803–1805)
- Juan Antonio de la Mata: (1805–1812)
- Benito Pérez: (1812–1813)
- Víctor de Salcedo y Somodevilla: (1813)
- Carlos Maynar: (1813–1815)
- Francisco de Ayala: (1815–1816)

=== Appointed by Ferdinand VII ===
- José Álvarez: (1816)
- Juan Domingo de Iturralde: (1816–1817)
- Alejandro de Hore: (1817–1820)
- Pedro Ruíz de Porras: (1820)
- Francisco Aguilar: (1820)
- Juan de Sámano y Urribarry: (1820–1821)
- Tomás Cires: (1821)
- Juan de la Cruz Mourgeón: (1821)
- José de Fábrega: (1821–1822)

== Sources ==
- Vicente Carvallo y Goyeneche, Descripcion Histórico Geografía del Reino de Chile, Tomo II, (Description Historical Geography of the Kingdom of Chile), Coleccíon de historiadores de Chile y documentos relativos a la historia nacional Vol. IX, By Diego Barros Arana, Sociedad Chilena de Historia y Geografía, Francisco Solano Astaburuaga, Instituto Chileno de Cultura Hispánica, Miguel Luis Amunátegui, Academia Chilena de la Historia, José Toribio Medina, Luis Montt, Published by Imprenta del Ferrocarril, 1875 Original from the University of Michigan, Digitized 4 Aug 2005, History of Chile 1542–1788)
- Pg.469 List of Governors and Captain Generals of Chile
