= Dawsonne Drake =

British colonial administrator; Captain General of the Philippines

1st British Governor-General of the Philippines Governor of Manila
- In office 2 November 1762 – 31 May 1764
- Monarch: George III of the United Kingdom
- Prime Minister: The Earl of Bute; George Grenville
- Secretary of State for the Southern Department: The Earl of Egremont; The Earl of Halifax
- Preceded by: Manuel Rojo del Rio y Vieyra (As Governor-General of the Philippines and Manila)
- Succeeded by: Francisco Javier de la Torre (As the Governor-General of the Philippines and Manila since 17 March 1764)

Governor of White Town
- In office 1742–1762

Personal details
- Born: 1724 Madras, India (now Chennai, India)
- Died: 1784 (aged 59–60) India

Dawsonne Drake (1724–1784) was the only British governor of Manila from 1762 to 1764, during when Britain took partial control of the Philippines during the Seven Years' War. Prior to his term as the Manila administrator, he was also the governor of Fort St. George from 1742 to 1762.

== Governorships ==
Born in Madras, India (now Chennai, India) in 1724, Dawsonne Drake was the second son of George Drake (4 December 1696 - 1741), a native of Buckland and descendant of Sir Francis Drake, and his wife, Sophia Bugden.

In 1742, Dawsonne Drake joined the British East India Company where he held the position as the clerk. At that time, he also became the governor of White Town, Madras. Because of his faithful service and good connection, he was promoted again and again until he became a member of the Madras Council.

On 2 November 1762, he assumed gubernatorial office as the first British governor after the Battle of Manila (1762). He led the Manila Council, assisted by Claud Russell and Samuel Johnson. During his administration in the Philippines, his term was scandalized by bitter quarrels with various military officers, including Major Fell, Capt. Backhouse, and Capt. Brereto. Drake "had the difficult tasks of collecting the ransom, promoting trade, and defending the perimeter. It is no wonder he had difficulties, but it is remarkable that he did so badly."

== Post-governorship ==
Upon his return to Madras in April 1766, he was tried by the Madras Council on criminal charges including extortion from the Chinese community and "abusing his authority to extort money from anyone who came into his power." He was found guilty and dismissed from the Council at Fort St. George, India on 2 December 1767. This sentence was later modified, and he was simply limited in his council rank.

Political offices
Preceded by Newly established Preceded by Manuel Rojo del Rio y Vieyra; As Governor-General of the Philippines and Manila	British Governor of Manila; 1762–1764	Succeeded by Abolished; Succeeded by Francisco Javier de la Torre; As the Governor-General of the Philippines and Manila (since 17 March 1764)
Preceded by ?	Governor of White Town, Madras; 1742–1762	Succeeded by ?
