= Juan Manuel de la Peña Bonifaz =

Spanish politician (c. 1625–1673)

26th Governor-General of the Philippines
- In office September 28, 1668 – September 24, 1669
- Monarch: Charles II of Spain
- Governor: (Viceroy of New Spain); Antonio Sebastián Álvarez de Toledo, 2nd Marquess of Mancera
- Preceded by: Diego de Salcedo
- Succeeded by: Manuel de León

Personal details
- Born: Juan Manuel de la Peña Bonifaz c. 1625 Spain
- Died: December 1673 (aged 48) Manila, Captaincy General of the Philippines

Juan Manuel de la Peña Bonifaz (c. 1625 - December 1673) was a Spanish politician who served as the ad interim 26th governor and captain-general of the Philippines from September 28, 1668 to September 24, 1669. Prior to his term as the governor-general, he served as the junior auditor of the Real Audiencia of Manila before he held the highest position by trickery. He succeeded Diego de Salcedo as the governor.

== Governorship ==
Before the start of Juan Manuel de la Peña Bonifaz's term, he was a junior auditor of the Real Audiencia of Manila. Before the end of his term, governor-general Diego de Salcedo had bitter quarrels with the Inquisition commissioner José de Paternina Samaniego which escalated into a coup d'état overthrowing his government on October 10, 1668.

Paternina installed Peña Bonifaz as the new governor through trickery with the help of two other members of the Audiencia. In return, he swore allegiance to Paternina, increased salary pay of the revolting Spanish soldiers and granted high position to those who helped him gain office. He used all Salcedo's treasury as well as the royal treasury in Manila to reward those who are in favor with him. He didn't know that a new governor, Manuel de León, has already been appointed by Charles II to replace Salcedo even before the latter was arrested during the coup.

On December 25, 1668, Peña Bonifaz ordered the weakening Salcedo to be deported back to Mexico. Salcedo, however, died in the Pacific Ocean.

De León reached Leyte in July 1669. When he entered Manila on September 14, he ordered all people involved in the imprisonment of Salcedo to undergo court trials and punishment. Paternina, being the commissioner of the Inquisition, was immune to criminal charges. Peña Bonifaz sought refuge in an Augustinian convent in Manila when he heard the news. When he was about to be arrested, friars denied the order because of the principle that whoever sought refuge in the Church is already under divine protection.

== Death ==
Few months after the Council of the Indies in Mexico lift all charges against Salcedo and issued a proclamation nullifying all orders and decrees executed by Peña Bonifaz. The Council cited his disqualification as a person who knew nothing to political policies and administration of the colonies which led to the gross spending of public treasury. Because of this, the Council sentenced Peña Bonifaz to be executed, but, before even hearing the sentence, he died of sickness at the convent in December 1673.

Political offices
Preceded by Diego de Salcedo	Governor and Captain-General of the Philippines; 1668–1669	Succeeded by Manuel de León
