= Mariano Ricafort Palacín y Abarca =

Spanish Filipino government official

Mariano Ricafort Palacín

61st Governor-General of the Philippines
- In office October 14, 1825 – December 23, 1830
- Monarch: Ferdinand VII of Spain
- Preceded by: Juan Antonio Martinez
- Succeeded by: Pasqual Enrile y Alcedo

Governor of Cuba
- In office 1832 – March 1834
- Preceded by: Francisco Dionisio Vives
- Succeeded by: Miguel Tacon

Intendant of La Paz
- In office 1816–1817
- Preceded by: José María Laudavere
- Succeeded by: Juan Sánchez Lima

Personal details
- Born: February 20, 1776 Huesca, Spain
- Died: October 16, 1846 (aged 70) Madrid, Spain
- Awards: Order of Isabella the Catholic, Order of Saint Ferdinand and of Merit, Royal and Military Order of Saint Hermenegild, Order of St. Anna

Military service
- Allegiance: Kingdom of Spain
- Rank
- Battles/wars: Peninsular War

Mariano Ricafort Palacín y Abarca (1776–1846) was Governor of Cuba, Intendant of La Paz, part of Rio de la Plata, and the 61st Governor-General of the Philippines. He was an able administrator and a governor of judgment and energy.

== Early life and career ==
Born in 1776, Ricafort was the son of José Ricafort y Abarca, Advocate of the Royal Council, and Juana Palacín y Aysa, a member of a noble family in Huesca. He was baptized at the Cathedral of Huesca and was later made regidor of the town for life.

In 1793, he enlisted in the military and served as an infantry cadet during the campaign in Roussillon. In October 1799, he was promoted to first lieutenant. During the War of the Oranges in 1801, he took part in a Spanish expedition against Portugal. He also participated in the Peninsular War, during which he was taken prisoner in October 1811. He was appointed by the Duke of Wellington as military governor of Badajoz in 1812. He was colonel of the reunited Regiment of Extremadura at the end of the war in 1815.

== South America ==
Ricafort was promoted to a brigadier in 1816 after the campaign in Upper Peru. During General Pablo Morillo's expedition to Caracas, Puerto Cabello and Cartagena de Indias (United Provinces of New Granada), he took part in a military campaign to fight Simon Bolívar's revolutionary armies. During this time, Ricafort was seriously wounded by a rifle shot in the bottom of the right leg; the bullet broke his tibia and fibula and left some shrapnel embedded in the skin. He was appointed Minister of the Tribunal Supremo de Guerra y Marina at Cusco, Peru, before becoming the Intendant of La Paz, which was the capital of the intendancies of Rio de la Plata. After he became the perpetual ambassador of the City of Paz in Peru, he returned to Spain and subsequently did not see any more active service until 1825.

== Philippines ==
Due to ill health, Ricafort returned to Spain before the end of the conquest of the South American colonies. In 1825, he was named Governor-General of the Philippines, arriving at Manila in October, and by a royal order also took possession of the intendancy of exchequer. That year, the government bought the Malacañan Palace, which had been vacant since the death of its previous owner, Colonel Jose Miguel. Ricafort's first task was to consolidate the absolutist system after the liberal phase of 1820–1823, and to that end in April 1826 he issued a Good Government Ordinance. It was designed to ensure strict compliance with the laws, and thus negate the efforts of the liberals. An order was also made to return estates to their religious owners and what was declared to them by the decree of 1776; it was also stated that the secularization of estates could only be enacted by express order of the king.

In order to promote the development of agriculture and local trade, Ricafort encouraged private trade by removing legal obstacles for doing so. He introduced modern farming tools, and exempted Filipino farmers from paying taxes if they planted specific crops such as coffee, cacao, cinnamon or cloves. Exemptions were also given to those that developed plantations of Chinese cinnamon, tea, and mulberry trees, and those that raised silk. During his term, he started the first Filipino insurance company in February 1827 and promoted the work of the Sociedad Económica de los Amigos del País or the Economic Society of Friends of the Country, which established the first papermill in the Philippines. In 1827, Ricafort sent an expedition against Jolo, which was repulsed by determined resistance from its inhabitants; in response the Spaniards burned the settlements on the shore, inflicting considerable damage upon the Moros. In that same year, the Spanish government reestablished the naval bureau at Manila, now independent of the captain-general, and Pasqual Enrile y Alcedo was appointed as its chief. He proceeded to reorganize all branches of the service, including a campaign against local pirates, whom he was largely able to restrain. He also constructed many cruisers and other naval vessels, one of which remained in active service for the next forty years. During his term, the Royal Company of the Philippines (Real Compañía de Filipinas), a company established in the 1780s to help promote the passage of Spanish ships past the Cape of Good Hope, collapsed.

=== Guam and the Marianas ===
In 1828, Ricafort received orders from Madrid that an improvement in the colonial administration of Guam and the Marianas be made. Several plans were debated, but the cheapest plan, which had been formulated by Ganga Herrero, was chosen. It only cost an annual expense of 6,424 pesos, as compared to the 8,000 peso budget. Ricafort appointed a new governor in the colony, and the plan was implemented on December 17, 1828. A rebellion, however, occurred in 1829. Ricafort then sent Captain Francisco Ramon de Villalobos to improve the colony's defenses and economy. In 1831, Villalobos succeeded as the governor of the colony. The Ricafort plan, however, failed mainly because Manila gave no new subsidy to Guam and the Marianas.

=== Dagohoy Rebellion ===
The Dagohoy Rebellion was instigated by Francisco Dagohoy, a cabeza de barangay in Bohol, in 1744. Due to the Agrarian Movement in 1745 and other uprisings in the Tagalog region, the Spanish failed to stop the growth of the Dagohoy community in the following years. Upon Ricafort's order, determined to quell the rebellion once and for all, Alcade-mayor Jose Lazaro Cairo, at the head of 2,200 Filipino-Spanish troops, equivalent to two armed regiments, and several batteries, invaded Bohol on May 7, 1827. The Boholanos resisted fiercely, and Cairo eventually failed. In April 1828, another Spanish expedition under Captain Manuel Sanz landed in Bohol. After more than a year of hard campaigning, he finally subdued the patriots. By August 31, 1829, the rebellion had ceased. Ricafort, with chivalric magnanimity, pardoned 19,420 survivors and permitted them to live in new villages at the Bohol lowlands. It ended the longest revolt in the history of the Philippines.

== Cuba ==
On his return to Spain in 1831, Ricafort requested the post of the Captaincy General of Mallorca, the Canary Islands or any entity that was vacant. From 1832 to 1834, he served as captain general of Cuba, as appointed by Ferdinand VII. His administration had to face a cholera epidemic that decimated the population and the return of exiled liberals. He was dismissed on March 7, 1834.

== Later work ==
From 1837 to 1838, Ricafort served as a senator and moved to A Coruña to be Captain General of Galicia at the same time. In November 1840, he was appointed Minister of War. By December of the same year, he was made commanding general of the Canary Islands. By May 1841, he was made Captain General of Aragon, and Captain General of Andalusia by November of the same year. He continued serving in office until March 24, 1843, when he was appointed Captain General of Extremadura. The same year, Ricafort moved to Madrid.

== Personal life ==
In 1803, he married Paula Antonia Sanchez Lima (Oliva de la Frontera, Extremadura), daughter of Ricafort's successor as Intendant of La Paz, Juan Sánchez Lima. She died in Madrid on June 1, 1854. They were parents of Mariana, Asunción, Ricardo y Mariano Ricafort and Sanchez. Ricafort died on October 16, 1846, in Madrid, Spain.

Political offices
Preceded by Juan Antonio Martínez	Governor-General of the Philippines; 1825–1830	Succeeded by Pasqual Enrile y Alcedo
