= Subijana de Álava =

Hamlet in Álava, Spain

Subiajana de Álava/Subillana-Gasteiz
- Concejo
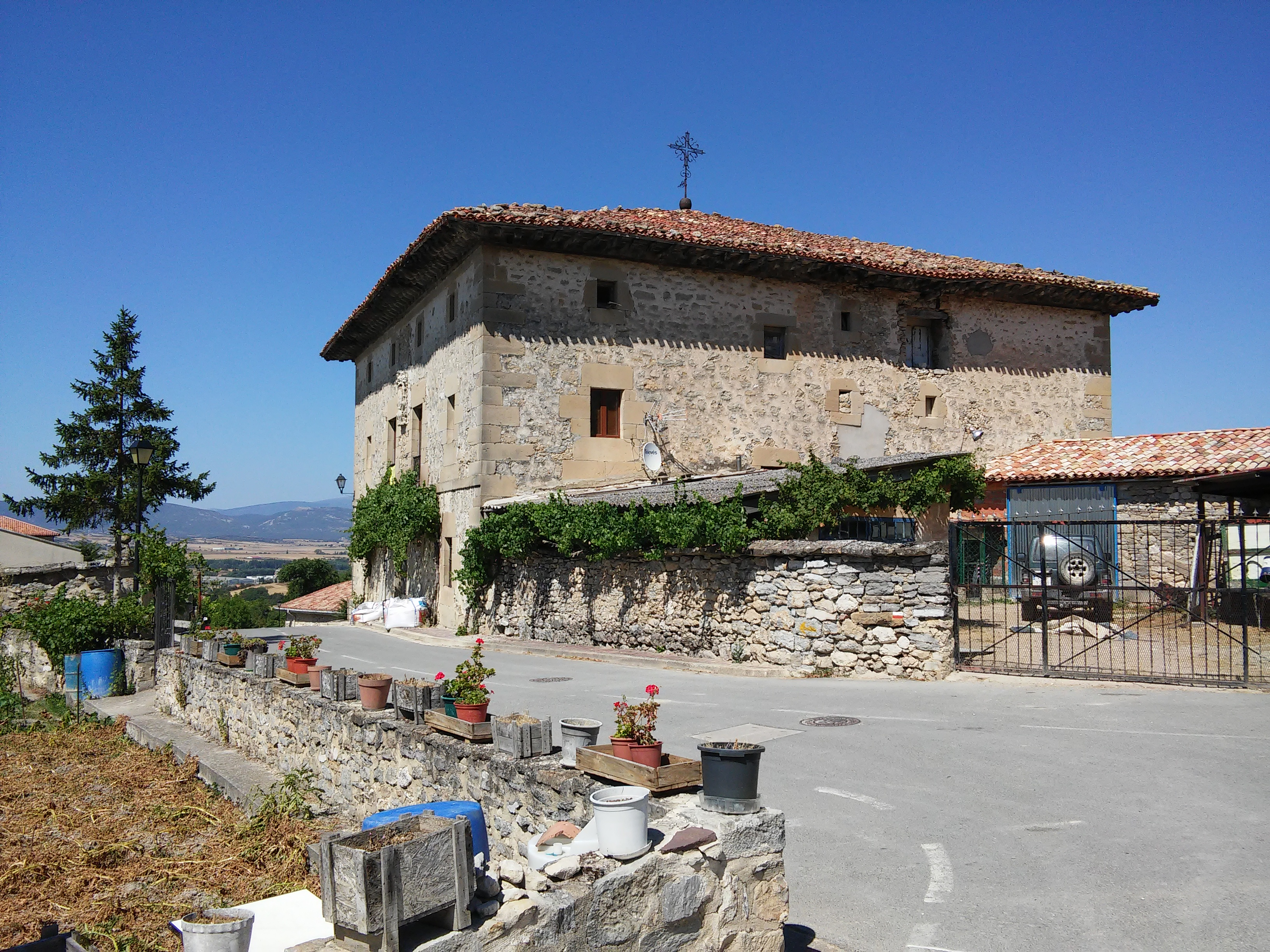
- Casa-Palacio de Simón de Anda y Salazar

- Location within Álava Location within the Basque Country Location within Spain
- Coordinates: 42°48′26″N 2°46′40″W
- Country: Spain
- Autonomous community: Basque Country
- Province: Álava
- Comarca: Vitoria-Gasteiz
- Municipality: Vitoria-Gasteiz

Area
  - Total: 5.23 km^{2} (2.02 sq mi)
- Elevation: 568 m (1,864 ft)

Population (2023)
  - Total: 50
  - Density: 9.6/km^{2} (25/sq mi)
- Postal code: 01195

Subijana de Álava (Spanish pronunciation: [suβiˈxana ðe ˈalaβa]) or Subillana-Gasteiz (Basque pronunciation: [s̺uβiʎana ɣas̺teis̻], alternatively in Basque: Subilla Gasteiz) is a hamlet and concejo in the municipality of Vitoria-Gasteiz, in Álava province, Basque Country, Spain. The Anda-Salazar Palace is located in the hamlet.
