= José Basco y Vargas =

Spanish noble and naval officer (1733–1805)

The Most Illustrious The Count of the Conquest of Batanes Islands KOS
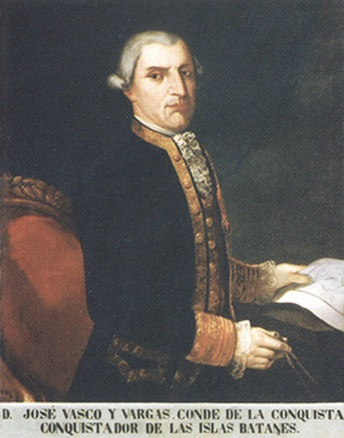

53rd Governor-General of the Philippines
- In office July 1778 – November 1787
- Monarch: Charles III of Spain
- Governor: (Viceroy of New Spain); Antonio María de Bucareli; Francisco Romá y Rosell; Martín de Mayorga; Matías de Gálvez y Gallardo; Vicente de Herrera y Rivero; Bernardo de Gálvez; Eusebio Sánchez Pareja; Alonso Núñez de Haro y Peralta; Manuel Antonio Flórez
- Preceded by: Pedro de Sarrio
- Succeeded by: Pedro de Sarrio

Personal details
- Born: José Máximo Ramón Basco y Pérez de Vargas; 29 May 1733 Málaga, Granada, Spain
- Died: 1805 (aged 73–74) Spanish East Indies

Military service
- Allegiance: Kingdom of Spain

José Basco y Vargas, 1st Count of the Conquest of Batanes Islands (Spanish: José Basco y Vargas, primer conde de la conquista de las islas Batanes) (1733–1805) was a naval officer of the Spanish Navy who served as the 53rd governor-general of the Spanish Philippines under the Spanish Empire from 1778 to 1787. An "economic minded" and "zealous" governor, his administration saw the rise of the local tobacco monopoly, the persistence of Moro raids, and the subjugation of the Ivatan natives of Batanes.

== Early life and career ==
Basco was originally an officer of the royal Spanish Navy.

== Governor-General of the Philippines ==
=== Arrival ===
After the death of Simón de Anda y Salazar in October 1776, Basco was appointed as the next governor-general by King Charles III, but not until July 1778, when he arrived at Manila. Concerning his character, he was said to be "energetic, able, and conscientious" and even "zealous".

Early in his rule, officials of the Real Audiencia conspired against him, asking for the revocation of Basco's appointment. They opposed all the new governor's attempts and desired to put Sarrio in his place. However, the officer refused to join them, and informed Basco of the conspiracy, and so they were soon arrested and sent to Spain. Afterward, he spent his entire governorship in pursuing the welfare and development of the colony.

=== Economic reforms ===
Up until Basco, the colonial government was largely supported by a Mexican subsidy of $250,000 (the US dollar as of 1905) a year, which also meant that the revenues produced by the colony were unproductive and the colony itself was a heavy burden to the capital. Therefore, Basco instituted the Plan general economico with the goal of freeing the colony from Chinese trade and Mexican subsidy, proving that the Philippines could be profitable on its own. At the same time, a royal decree dated to August 27, 1780, ordered him to convene all the competent people in the colony "to form an association of selected persons, capable of producing useful ideas". However, when the decree arrived, Basco already organized the Sociedad Económica de los Amigos del País in 1781 which incentivized farmers to plant cotton, spices, and sugarcane; encouraged miners to extract various metals such as gold and silver; rewarded investors for scientific discoveries; and offered premiums for the encouragement of manufacturing industries. In the meantime, when Basco went to Camarines, he urged the planting of at least four million mulberry trees, as part of his economic agenda, yielding excellent product for some years. Even for a full century after Basco, the society, despite being inactive for long periods of time, was instrumental in the development of the colony.

The tobacco industry also became the "first real internal revenue" of the colony, successfully raising funds for the colonial government and making Philippine tobacco famous all over Asia. In achieving this, the industry was placed under government control during Basco's administration. Moreover, in 1782, Basco issued instructions to those "under obligation to prevent loss to the revenue from tobacco" for the prevention of smuggling and the creation of a board of direction for the revenue, a general office of administration, and subordinate offices to this in the provinces. Despite strong opposition, Basco was able to organize the tobacco monopoly successfully. Finally, also in 1782, a monopoly was instituted in selected provinces, such as Cagayan, where nothing was planted but tobacco. The harvests were then sold only to the government at pre-designated prices and either exported or sent to cigarette factories in Manila. In the administration's supervision of the provinces, Basco himself would visit them in person, informing himself of their state in order to remedy them.

Meanwhile, more economic reforms were instituted by the Basco administration. In 1785, the "Royal Company of the Philippines" was created as a trading corporation with protection from the Spanish crown and special privileges. Thus, the company had a complete monopoly in the commerce between Spain and the Philippines, except the Manila-Acapulco trade. In addition, shipping vessels were allowed to visit Chinese ports and all the old laws which prevented the importation of other Asian goods into the colony were removed. Further, in 1789, after Basco already left the colony, the port of Manila was made free to vessels of all foreign nations for the importation and sale of Asian goods. However, European products, except for Spain, were still forbidden.

=== Relationship with the Moros ===
A priority of the Basco administration is to restrain the Moro raids and attacks. In doing so, he improved the fortifications in Manila, Cavite, Mindanao, and the Visayan islands; stationed small vessels throughout the provinces; and sent an expedition to Mindoro which drove out the pirates there. In reaction to the anti-Moro efforts, the sultan of Jolo humbly asked Basco for peace and returned to the Spaniards a small vessel captured near Antique. These checks on the Moros also improved trade.

The natives also voluntarily joined in the efforts of the colonial government. In 1781, the Bulacan natives offered to pay for the cost of two vessels to sail against the Moros and self-imposed a tax for this purpose. Being insufficient at first, the tax increased in the summer of 1784. This example was followed by those in Pampanga.

At the same time, in diverting military resources for the conquest of Batanes, the Moros subsequently increased their attacks in the Visayas, carrying away many captives.

=== Conquests ===
In 1782, Basco sent an expedition in the hopes of obtaining the consent of the Ivatans to become Spanish subjects. One reason why the Spanish wanted to claim Batanes was to prevent the islands from falling into British hands, as ships of the English East India Company were already increasingly using the Bashi Channel. Later, on June 26, 1783, the representatives of the native people met Joseph Huelva y Melgarejo and some Dominican priests on the plains of Basco to perform the formal annexation rites. Melgarejo was therefore appointed as the first governor of Batanes.

As part of the annexation, the new province was named Provincia de la Concepcion; later, the governor-general received the title of Conde dela Conquista de Batanes; and the capital town, Basco, was named after him. Garrisons also were established.

=== Countercrime operations ===
When Basco became governor, highwaymen infested the provincial roads near Manila. In order to repress them, he appointed judges, each accompanied by a counsellor and an executioner, who tried the robbers in their respective places and gave them subsequent penalty. Although there was opposition from the Real Audiencia, the measure was so effective that in a short time security was assured everywhere.

=== Revolts ===
In response to the annexation of Batanes, the Ivatans, with their elders and leaders, such as the heroic Aman Dangat, revolted against foreign rule from 1785. In the same year, the Igorots in Nueva Vizcaya, led by Lagutao, revolted and had to be reconquered by a force of 300 musketeers from Cagayan. The rebel leader was killed in battle.

=== Education ===
Basco's administration improved the schools then and promoted the knowledge of the Castilian language.

=== Military ===
During Basco's rule, the army was reorganized. He also arranged various military expeditions to occupy the Igorots.

=== Relationship with the Chinese ===
In 1778, Basco revoked the order expelling the Chinese, making a considerable number of them return to Manila.

== Later life ==
Despite his many efforts, Basco was still disliked and opposed, and, in the end, he resigned as governor-general in 1787. When he first offered the resignation, it was not accepted, but the king later allowed him to hand over the government to Pedro Sarrio, who held the office of governor for only six months.

At the end of November 1787, Basco embarked for Spain. Then, for his honorable service, he was promoted in the Spanish Navy and made the governor of Cartagena.

Preceded by Pedro de Sarrio	Spanish Governor - Captain General of the Philippines; 1778–1787	Succeeded by Pedro de Sarrio
