= Diego de Salcedo =

Spanish army officer

25th Governor-General of the Philippines
- In office September 8, 1663 – September 28, 1668
- Monarchs: Philip IV of Spain; Charles II of Spain
- Governor: (Viceroy of New Spain); Juan Francisco Leiva y de la Cerda; Diego Osorio de Escobar y Llamas; Antonio Sebastián Álvarez de Toledo, 2nd Marquess of Mancera
- Preceded by: Sabiniano Manrique de Lara
- Succeeded by: Juan Manuel de la Peña Bonifaz

Personal details
- Born: Belgium
- Died: 1669 Pacific Ocean

Military service
- Allegiance: Kingdom of Spain
- Battles/wars: Eighty Years' War

Diego de Salcedo, a Spanish army officer during the Eighty Years' War, was the Governor-General of the Philippines from 1663 to 1668. He reinforced the army of the archipelago and promoted trade with America. In his participation during the Eighty Years' War, he was made Governor of Jülich after the Spanish victory at the Siege of Jülich in August 1621.

== Sail to the Philippines ==
On December 2, 1661, King Philip IV appointed him as the new Governor-General of the Philippines. He sailed to New Spain before sailing for the Philippines. The galleon San José, however, was delayed in its voyage from Manila until 1662, and docked in Acapulco in 1663. Salcedo was forced to sail on March 25, 1663.

Aboard the ship with Salcedo were 11 Augustinian friars bound for the Philippines. One of them was José de Paternina Samaniego, appointed commissioner of the Holy Office of the Inquisition.

== Governor-General of the Philippines ==
Due to the rainy season, Salcedo did not land in Leyte, which was the usual landing place. Instead, he was brought up North, to Cape Engaño. He reached Manila in September 1663. In a letter written by Salcedo to his friend Francisco Yzquierdo in 1664, Salcedo mentioned the situation of the Philippines. In the letter, Salcedo stated that the treasury only had 35,000 pesos. The Spanish in the archipelago were tired of the many rebellions in North Luzon, and the soldiers have not received any pay.

Trade in the Philippines was dull so Salcedo tried reviving Philippine trade by sending envoys to Indonesia and Thailand for negotiations on trade status.

In 1665, Salcedo heard of the existence of gold mines in the Cordilleras, an area dominated by people called ygolotes. So, Salcedo formed an expedition of around 100 men led by Admiral Pedro Duran de Monforte to go Christianize the people in the area and excavate the gold at the same time. The mission, however, failed due to difficult terrain met by the expedition.

In order to contain the serious Zambal uprisings, Salcedo ordered a fort be built in Paynauen. Fort Paynauen was once the most formidable Spanish garrison in Central Luzon during the first century of the Spanish regime in the Philippines. Also known as Playa Honda, the fort was constructed on the advice of Admiral de Monforte.

Mexican convicts were usually shipped to the Philippines to serve involuntary military service for the Spanish army in the archipelago. Salcedo raised 100,000 pesos in order to acquire real soldiers for the Spanish in the Philippines. Salcedo also obtained 120,000 pesos, which is the subsidy of New Spain for the Philippines. Officials got 30,000 pesos from the subsidy upon consent of Salcedo.

== Last years ==
In Salcedo's last year as Governor-General of the Philippines (1668), a coup was organized by Paternina to topple Salcedo from power. The master of arms of Intramuros, Agustin de Zepeda, was allied with Paternina, as well as General Sebastian Rayo, Nicolas de Pamplona (one of the alcalde ordinarios of Manila), and other men. Salcedo was caught immediately and Juan Manuel de la Peña Bonifaz succeeded him. Peña went on giving all the wealth acquired by Salcedo to Paternina and his allies, including 10,000 pesos for himself. Salcedo was imprisoned for a year before being shipped to New Spain to face the Holy Office of the Inquisition. He died during the voyage due to his failing health.

== Legacy ==
Salcedo, a 4th class municipality in the province of Ilocos Sur, was named after him.

Preceded by Sabiniano Manrique de Lara	Spanish Governor - Captain General of the Philippines; 1663–1668	Succeeded by Juan Manuel de la Peña Bonifaz
