= Pasqual Enrile y Alcedo =

Spanish governor-general in the Philippines

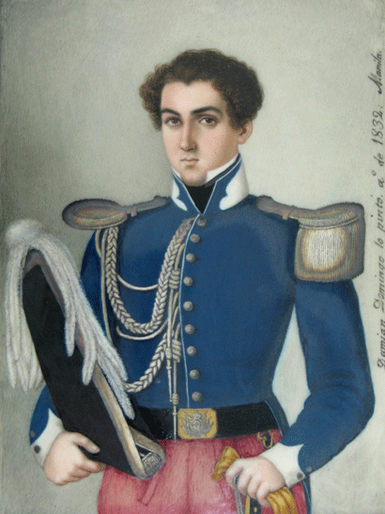
- Portrait by Damián Domingo, 1832

63rd Governor-General of the Philippines
- In office December 23, 1830 – March 1, 1835
- Monarch: Ferdinand VII of Spain
- Preceded by: Mariano Ricafort Palacín y Abarca
- Succeeded by: Gabriel de Torres

Lieutenant Commander (Segundo Cabo) of the Philippines
- In office 1826–1830
- Succeeded by: Gabriel de Torres

Personal details
- Born: Pasqual Enrile y Alcedo; April 13, 1772 Cádiz, Spain
- Died: January 6, 1836 (aged 63) Madrid, Spain
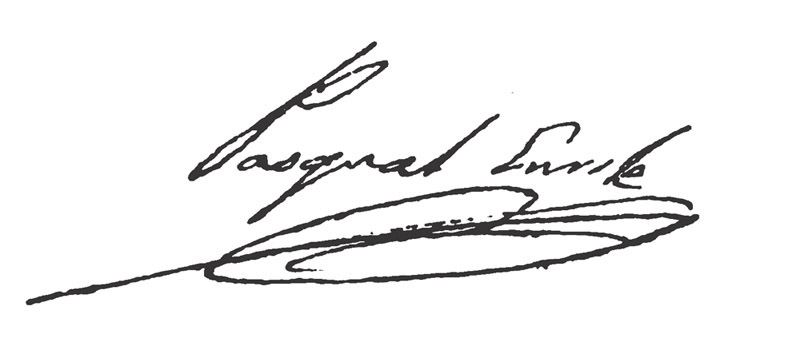
- Signature

Pasqual Enrile y Alcedo (13 April 1772 – 6 January 1836), a native of Cádiz, Spain, was the Spanish governor-general of the Philippines from December 23, 1830, to March 1, 1835. He was among the most illustrious rulers of the archipelago, on account of his ability, uprightness, and zeal for the public welfare. Enrile was especially active in building highways and providing other means of communication to bring the inland and the maritime provinces into communication with each other.

== Early life ==
Enrile was born in Cádiz on 13 April 1772. He enlisted as a Marine Guard in the department in Ferrol, Galicia, on 10 June 1788, continuing his service in the Royal Navy for 23 years, having gone through all the successive levels to become a captain of the frigate which he obtained on 23 February 1809.

In 1826, he was appointed segundo cabo (commander of the army or lieutenant-commander) of the Spanish East Indies in July 1829, and on 23 December 1830, the Governor-General of the islands.

== Segundo Cabo ==
In 1826, the Spanish government re-established the naval bureau at Manila which is independent of the governor-general, and Pasqual Enrile was appointed as its chief. He proceeded to reorganize all branches of the service, including that intended to serve against the pirates, whom he was able to restrain to a great extent. Under his command, he constructed several cruisers and other vessels, one of which remained in active service for forty years. He also established the jurisdiction of the bureau throughout the archipelago, creating port captains for Iloilo, Capiz, Cebu, and Pangasinan.

== Governor-General ==
A most zealous and able governor, he personally visited the northern provinces of Luzon, accompanied by his relative and adjutant, José Maria Peñaranda, a military engineer, with expeditions to the mountain people of the country, especially the Igorots between 1831 and 1832. Afterwards, he made journeys and surveys in a large part of the rest of the island resuslting in carefully prepared itineraries, plans, and maps, which were utilized in the construction of highways and bridges, and the establishment of postal routes, which opened up communication between regions before destitute of such facilities, and sometimes in places heretofore deemed impassable. The navigable rivers and bayous of Pangasinan provinces were explored and mapped. A highway was made in Pampanga province which was safe from the overflow of Lake Canarem, Victoria, Tarlac province. Explorations were made from east to west in Luzon for the sake of bringing the shores of the island into communication with the fertile plains of the interior. Enrile created the Guia de Forasteros or "Guide for Strangers" to the Philippines, which first appeared in 1834.

The treasury officials, by a decree of July 3, 1833, accepted the proposal of group of persons to establish a lottery, at their own account and risk, offering to pay to the treasury forty per cent of the receipts, besides twenty-five per cent of the value of the tickets which composed each drawing, after furnishing adequate security as a guarantee for the fulfillment of their promise. The exclusive privilege of this lottery was granted to these group for a period of five years.

Many useful laws were passed and the islands prospered during this term. The royal tribunal of commerce was created in Manila, January 1, 1834, while the Royal Company of the Philippines (Real Compañía de Filipinas) was dissolved by royal order of September 6, 1834. The establishment of the Royal Company of the Philippines, though unsuccessful financially, stimulated considerably the development of Philippine agriculture between 1790 and 1820, after which it did little until its dissolution.

Enrile increased the area planted in tobacco, enforced just weights and measures, endeavored to correct the evils resulting from the debased money of the islands. The Economic Society of Friends of the Country contributed to the development of agriculture, in the time of Enrile, by its reports, memoirs, and material support. However, in 1833 this Society, in an opinion requested from it by the home government, opposed the establishment of a mint at Manila, and informed Enrile that such institution was at that time unnecessary. A decree of May 9, 1831, established a custom-house in Zamboanga province, to prevent the frauds committed by foreigners in the port of Jolo, and to facilitate and promote expeditions to that point."

He proposed the establishment of a lighthouse on Corregidor Island at the entrance to Manila Bay where the main trading port of the country, Manila, is situated. It was approved by Royal Order of July 4, 1835, but was not completed until 1853. Enrile strengthened the naval forces sent against the pirates and was able to drive them away from the coasts of Visayas.

On February 2, 1835, the official dispatches arrived from Spain which decreed the restoration of the constitutional regime and the convocation of the Cortes. Enrile resigned his post on March 1, 1835, and returned to Spain right after. He died in Madrid on January 6, 1836, at the age of 60 years and nine months.

== Legacy ==
According to Jose Montero y Vidal, a Spanish historian who wrote much about the history of the Philippines, Pasqual Enrile was one of the most intelligent and industrious person to have ever ruled the Philippines. To him, the country owed material improvements that held as much importance as the great highways of Luzon, which have facilitated the intercourse between the provinces, bringing them into postal communication. One after another, by means of the mail-routes established by him. The administration of the country is indebted to him for regulations and procedures that are scientific and orderly, in all the branches that have contributed to the development of the general welfare. This made a considerable increase in the public wealth, agriculture, commerce, and navigation likewise experienced the beneficial results of this illustrious governor's judicious management. His term of office was the source of the rapid progress which has been made from that time by these most important factors of the general welfare. Thanks to the impulse received from the measures, dictated by him, which conduced to the natural development of those industries.

This governor sailed for Spain and like all the governor-generals of the Spanish overseas possessions, he had been elevated as a hero of Spain. The municipality of Enrile, Cagayan in the Philippines was named after him in his honor.

Political offices
Preceded by Mariano Ricafort Palacín y Abarca	Spanish Governor-General of the Philippines; 1830–1835	Succeeded by Gabriel de Torres
