= Simón de Anda y Salazar =

Spanish governor of the Philippines

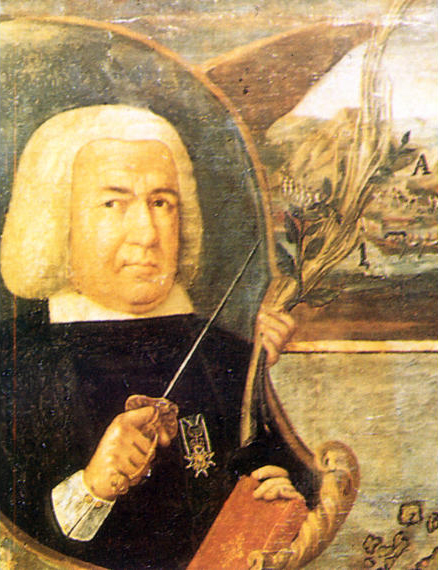

Governor-General of the Philippines
- In office July 1770 – 30 October 1776
- Monarch: Charles III of Spain
- Governor: (Viceroy of New Spain); Carlos Francisco de Croix, 1st Marquess of Croix; Antonio María de Bucareli
- Preceded by: José Antonio Raón y Gutiérrez
- Succeeded by: Pedro de Sarrio

Leader of the Spanish Resistance in the Philippines
- In office 6 October 1762 – 30 January 1764

Personal details
- Born: 28 October 1709 Subijana, Basque Country, Spain
- Died: 30 October 1776 (aged 67) Cavite, Captaincy General of the Philippines

Military service
- Battles/wars: Seven Years' War

Simón de Anda y Salazar (28 October 1709 – 30 October 1776) was the Spanish governor-general of the Philippines from July 1770 to 30 October 1776. He was born in the Basque Country in northern Spain.

== Oidor at the Royal Audience of Manila and lieutenant governor ==
De Anda y Salazar was an Oidor of the Royal Audience of Manila, who was appointed as Lieutenant Governor of the city by the Governor-General of the Philippines and the Audiencia itself during the British occupation of Manila. He departed Manila on the night of 5 October 1762, during the Battle of Manila (1762), and established a Spanish provisional colonial government and army in Bulacan. The acting governor of Manila, Archbishop Manuel Rojo, was captured by the British and surrendered the Philippines, but this act was rejected as illegal by Anda.

== Resistance ==
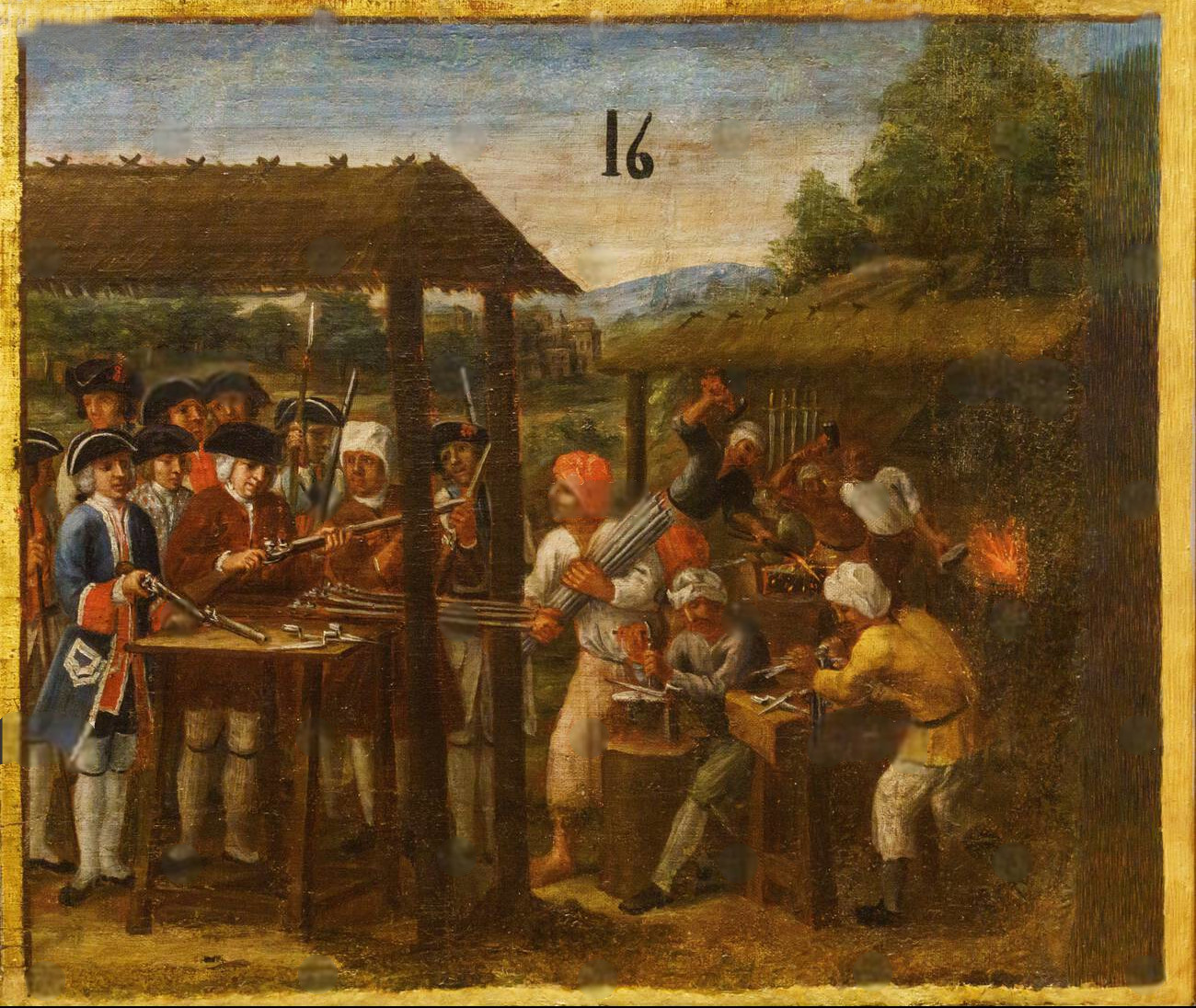
Simon de Anda and his Filipino army under Spanish rule. Portrayed in Alegoría de la defensa de Filipinas.

Anda escaped from Manila with much of the treasury and documents, assumed full authority on behalf of the Real Audiencia of Manila, established the provisional government and raised an army in Bulacan (later Pampanga), and continued the military campaign against the British. All early negotiations between him and the British forces in Manila proved unsuccessful, as he returned unopened all letters sent to him that did not address him as the Governor-General of the Philippines, something that the British refused to do until the death of Archbishop Rojo on 30 January 1764.

In March 1764, orders were brought from both the King of Britain and the King of Spain by the Spanish governor designate Brigadier Don Francisco de la Torre, requiring the handover of the city to Spain in accordance with the 1763 Treaty of Paris. British Governor Drake was charged with culpability as governor but forestalled an adverse finding by resigning and leaving the Philippines on 29 March 1764. The Manila Council elected Alexander Dalrymple as governor on the same day, but the Manila garrison would not obey him. On 1 April 1764 the Manila garrison ceremonially marched out, embarking for home, and giving the Spanish control of Manila with de la Torre as Governor and Captain-General of the Spanish Philippines.

== Governor-General of the Philippines ==
Anda traveled to Spain, and was well received by the Cortes Generales (parliament), and made Councilor of Castile by the King, in spite of having written a letter to him complaining of certain disorders in the Philippines, enumerating among them a number against the friars.

On 12 April 1768 he returned to the Philippines and by Royal Decree became Governor-General in July 1770. He proceeded against his predecessor, and other politicians, and roused the opposition and reformed the Spanish and Philippine army, and engaged in other public works. He opposed the king's order of 9 November 1774, to secularize the curacies held by regulars. After his death, the order was repealed on 11 December 1776.

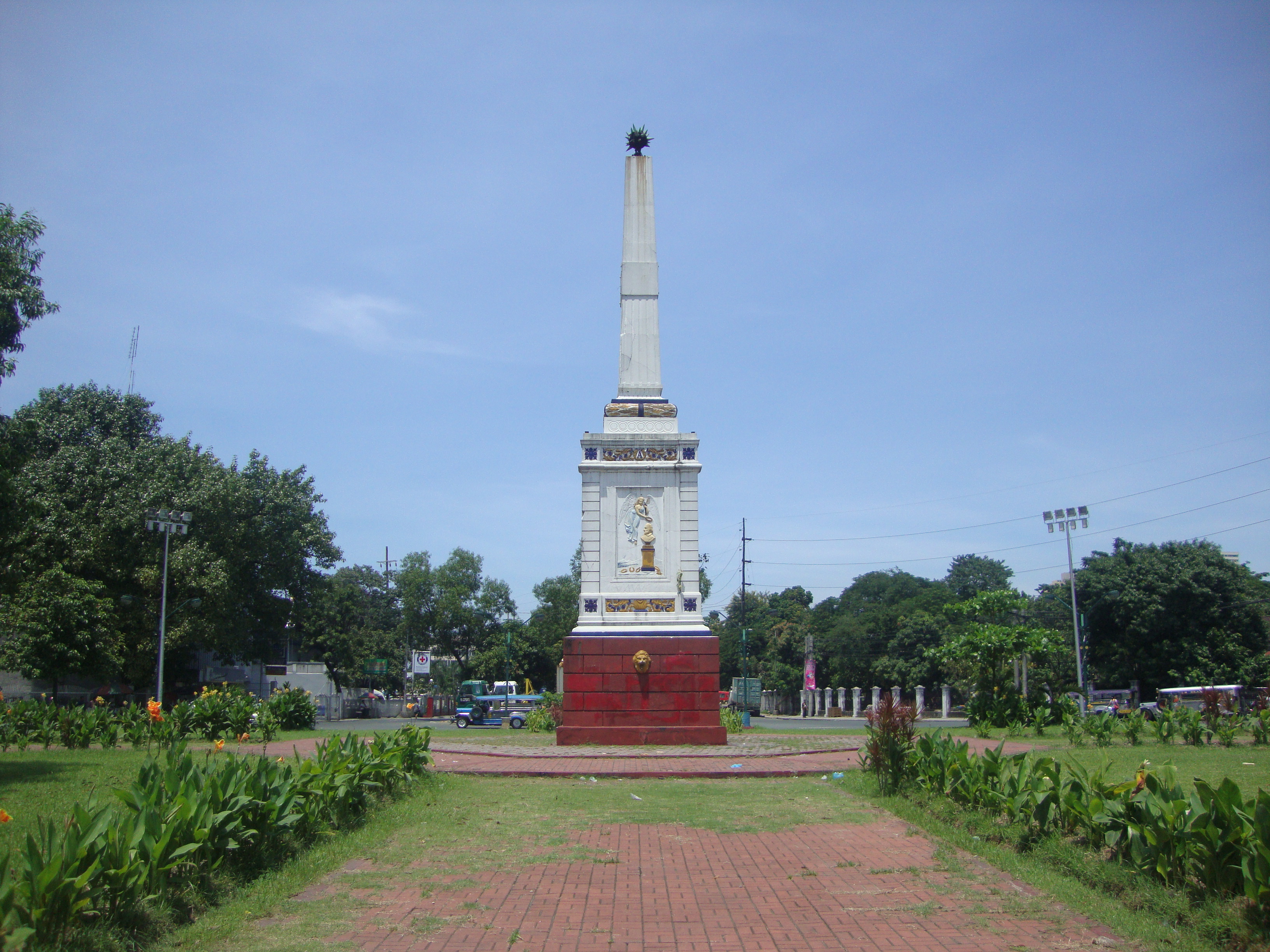
Anda Monument in Manila

De Anda y Salazar died on 30 October 1776, in the Hospital de San Felipe, in Cavite at the age of 67 years.

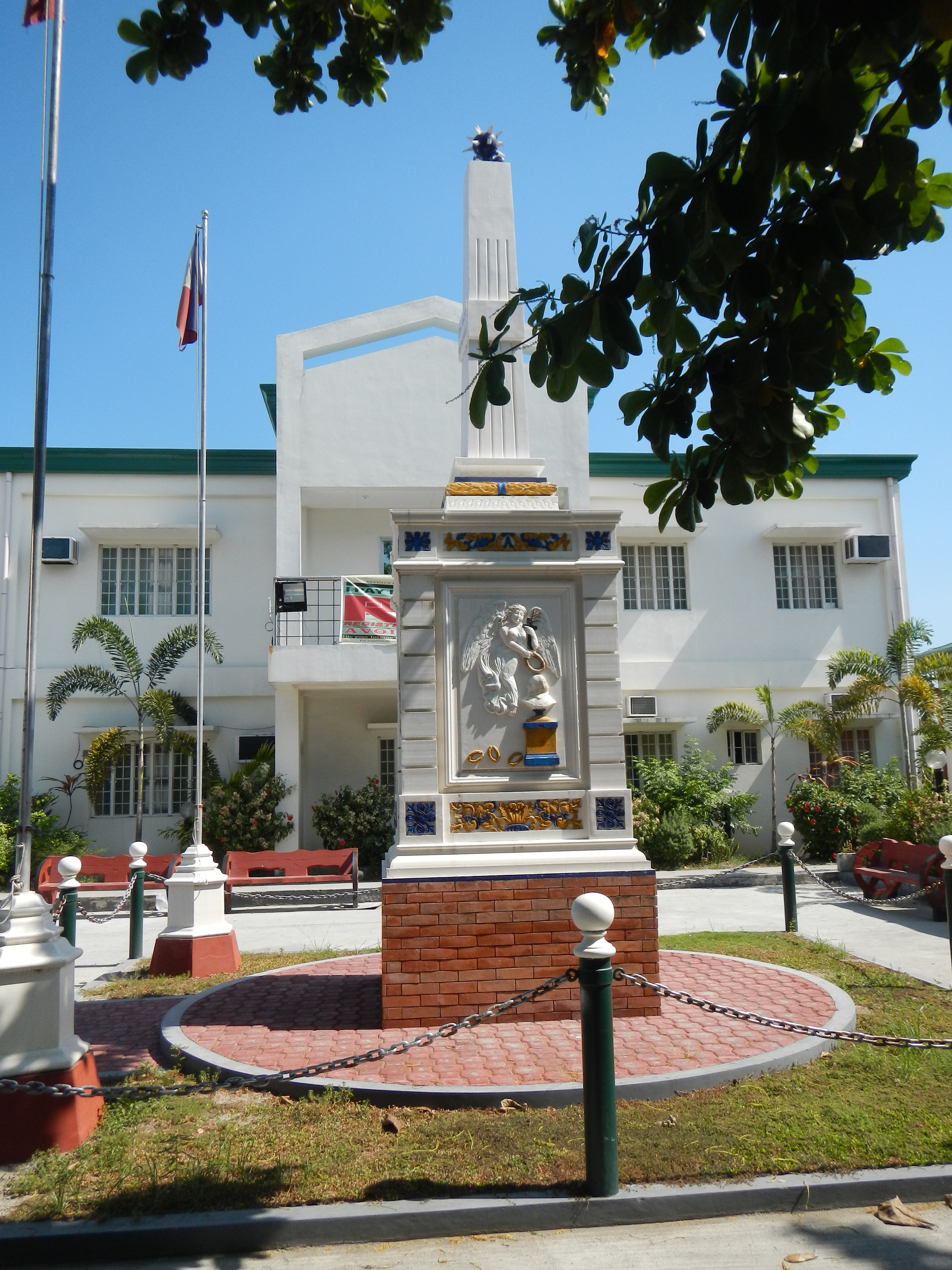
Simón de Anda y Salazar Monument in Bacolor, Pampanga

== Legacy ==
The Anda Monument in Manila was erected in his legacy, as well as the one in Bacolor, Pampanga. The Philippine municipalities of Anda in Bohol and Anda in Pangasinan are named after him. A street has also been named after him in the Basque capital of Vitoria, close to his natal town of Subijana.

== See also ==
- British occupation of Manila
- Royal Audience of Manila
- History of the Philippines

Political offices
New title	Dictator of the Spanish Provisional Government of the Philippines in Bacolor, Pampanga; 1762–1764	None
Preceded by José Antonio Raón y Gutiérrez	Governor-General of the Philippines; 1770–1776	Succeeded by Pedro de Sarrio
