= British occupation of Manila =

Occupation of the Philippine city by the British between 1762 and 1764

Manila Maynila (Tagalog)
- 1762–1764
- Flag
- Anthem: God Save the King
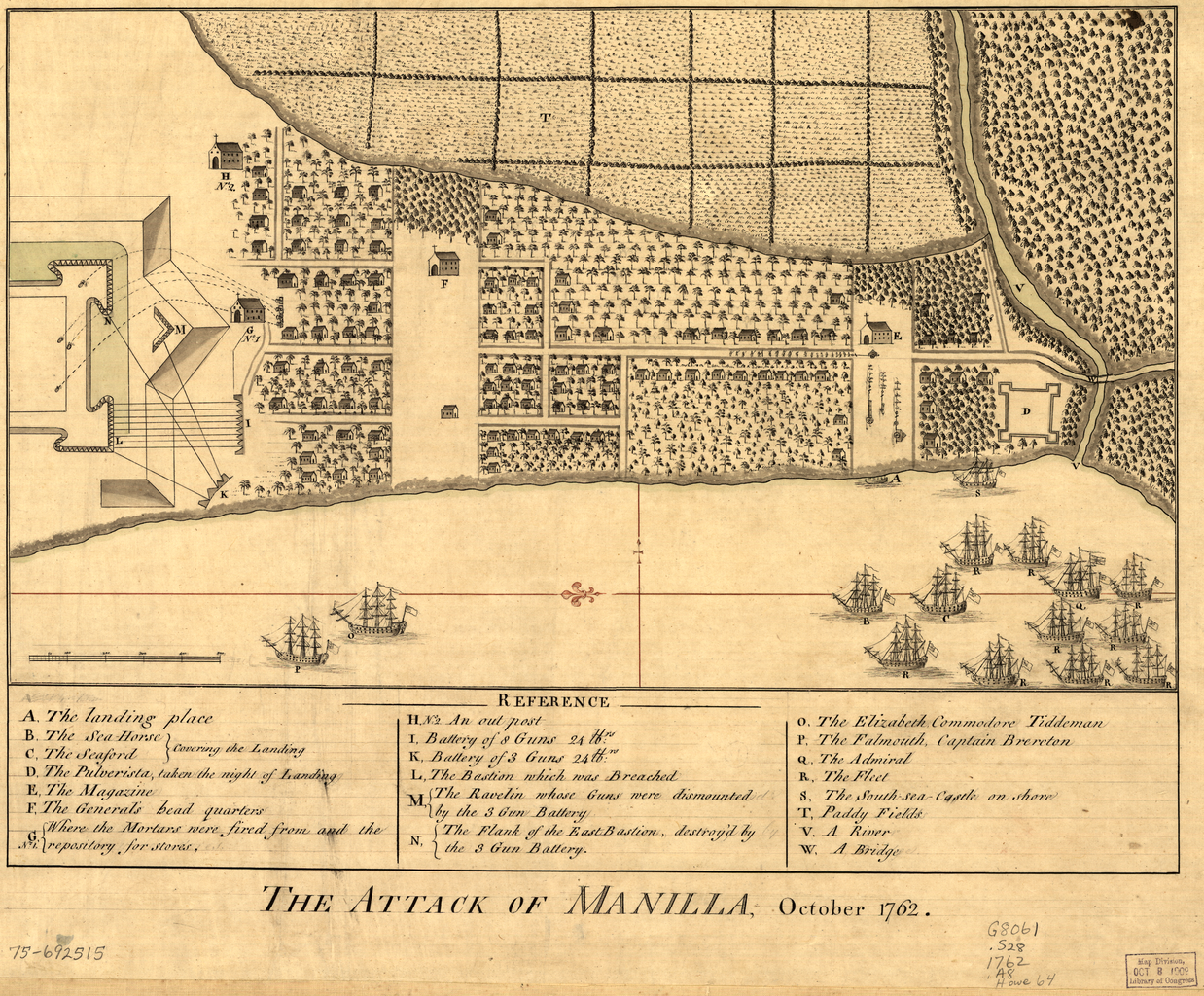
- "The Attack of Manilla, October 1762", depicting the British capture of Manila
- Status: Occupation of Manila by the Kingdom of Great Britain
- Capital: Manila, Bacolor, Pampanga (Spanish Philippine colonial government retains control outside of Manila and Cavite)
- Official languages: English
- Common languages: Tagalog • Spanish
- Religion: Roman Catholicism
- Monarch
  - 1760–1820: George III
- Governor-General
  - 1762–1764: Dawsonne Drake
- Historical era: Spanish colonial rule
  - Battle of Manila: 6 October 1762
  - Treaty of Paris: 31 May 1764
- Currency: Spanish dollar
Preceded by	Succeeded by
Captaincy General of the Philippines	Captaincy General of the Philippines

The Kingdom of Great Britain occupied the Spanish colonial capital of Manila and the nearby port of Cavite for eighteen months, from 6 October 1762 to the first week of April 1764. The occupation was an extension of the larger Seven Years' War between Britain and France, which Spain had recently entered on the side of the French.

The British wanted to use Manila as an entrepôt for trade in the region, particularly with China. In addition, the Spanish governor agreed to deliver a ransom to the British in exchange for the city being spared from any further sacking. However, the resistance from the provisional Spanish colonial government, established by members of the Royal Audience of Manila and led by Lieutenant Governor Simón de Anda y Salazar, whose mostly Filipino troops prevented British forces from expanding their control beyond the neighbouring towns of Manila and Cavite, led to the project's abandonment.

== Background ==
At the time, Britain and France were belligerents in what was later termed the Seven Years' War but Spain remained neutral despite diplomatic approaches from both sides. The war began badly for the British but as it progressed the tide of the war turned strongly in their favour and the neutral Spanish government became alarmed that the string of major French losses was transforming the British into a major threat to Spanish overseas interests. France successfully negotiated a treaty with Spain known as the Family Compact which was signed on 15 August 1761. By an ancillary secret convention, Spain committed to making preparations for war against Britain. Britain first declared war against Spain on 4 January 1762, and on 18 January 1762, Spain issued their own declaration of war against Britain.

On 6 January 1762, the British Cabinet led by Prime Minister John Stuart, agreed to attack Havana in the West Indies, and approved Colonel William Draper's scheme for taking Manila with his forces, which were already in the East Indies. Draper was commanding officer of the 79th Regiment of Foot, which was then stationed at Madras in British India. Weeks later, King George III of Great Britain signed the instructions which permitted Draper to implement his scheme, emphasising that by taking advantage of the 'existing war with Spain', Britain might be able to assure her post-war mercantile expansion. Manila was one of the most important trading cities in Asia during this period, and the East India Company wished to extend its influence in the archipelago. As a result, there was an expectation that the commerce of Spain would suffer a 'crippling blow'.

Upon arriving in India, Draper's brevet rank became brigadier general. A secret committee of the East India Company agreed to provide a civil governor for the administration of the Islands, and in July 1762, they appointed Dawsonne Drake for the post.

=== British conquest of Manila ===
On 24 September 1762, a British fleet of eight ships of the line, three frigates, and four store ships with a force of 6,839 regulars, sailors and marines, sailed into Manila Bay from Madras. The expedition, led by William Draper and Samuel Cornish, captured Manila, "the greatest Spanish fortress in the western Pacific".

The Spanish defeat at Manila was in part due to the neglect of the city's military preparedness and poor military leadership during the battle. This had come about because the former Governor-General of the Philippines, Pedro Manuel de Arandia, had died in 1759 and his replacement, Francisco de la Torre, had not arrived due to the British capture of Havana in Spanish Cuba. In the interim, the Spanish Crown appointed the militarily inexperienced Mexican-born Archbishop of Manila Manuel Rojo del Río y Vieyra as a temporary Lieutenant Governor. As a result, many military mistakes were made by the defenders of the city.

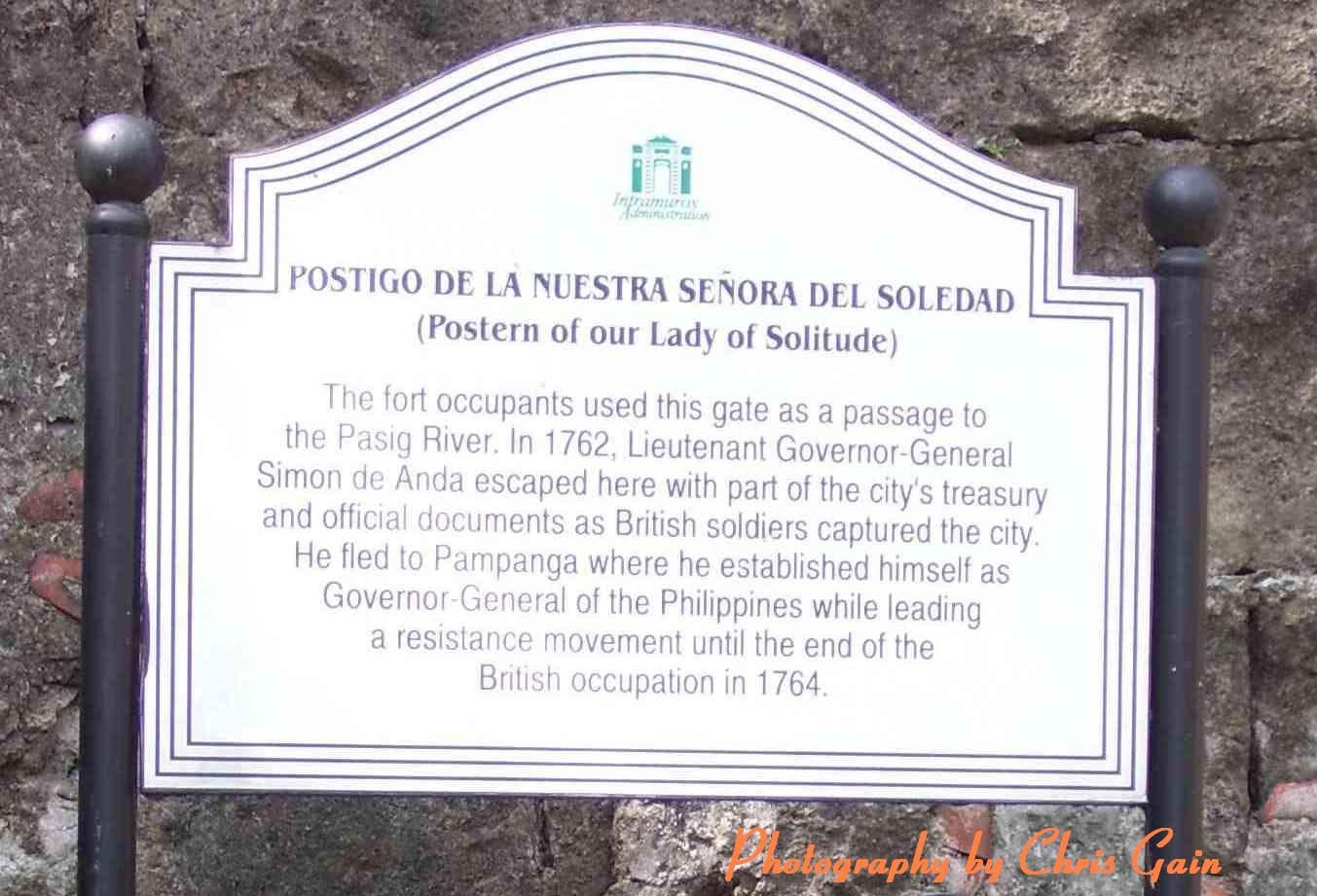
Sign at Fort Santiago, Manila, marking the departure point of Simón de Anda y Salazar.

On 5 October 1762 (4 October local calendar), the night before the fall of the walled city of Manila, the Spanish military persuaded Rojo to summon a council of war. Several times the Archbishop wished to capitulate, but was prevented. That same day with very heavy battery fire, the British had successfully breached the walls of the bastion of San Diego. The British had emptied the water in the ditch, dismounted the cannons of that bastion and the two adjoining bastions, San Andes and San Eugeno. In addition they set fire to parts of the town, and drove the Spanish forces from the walls. At dawn of 6 October, British forces attacked the breach and took the fortifications, meeting little resistance.

During the siege, the Spanish lost three officers, two sergeants, 50 troops of the line, and 30 militiamen, besides many wounded. Among the Filipino troops, there were 300 killed and 400 wounded. The British suffered 147 killed and wounded, of whom sixteen were officers. The British fleet expended more than 20,000 cannonballs and 5,000 bombs during their bombardment.

== Occupation ==
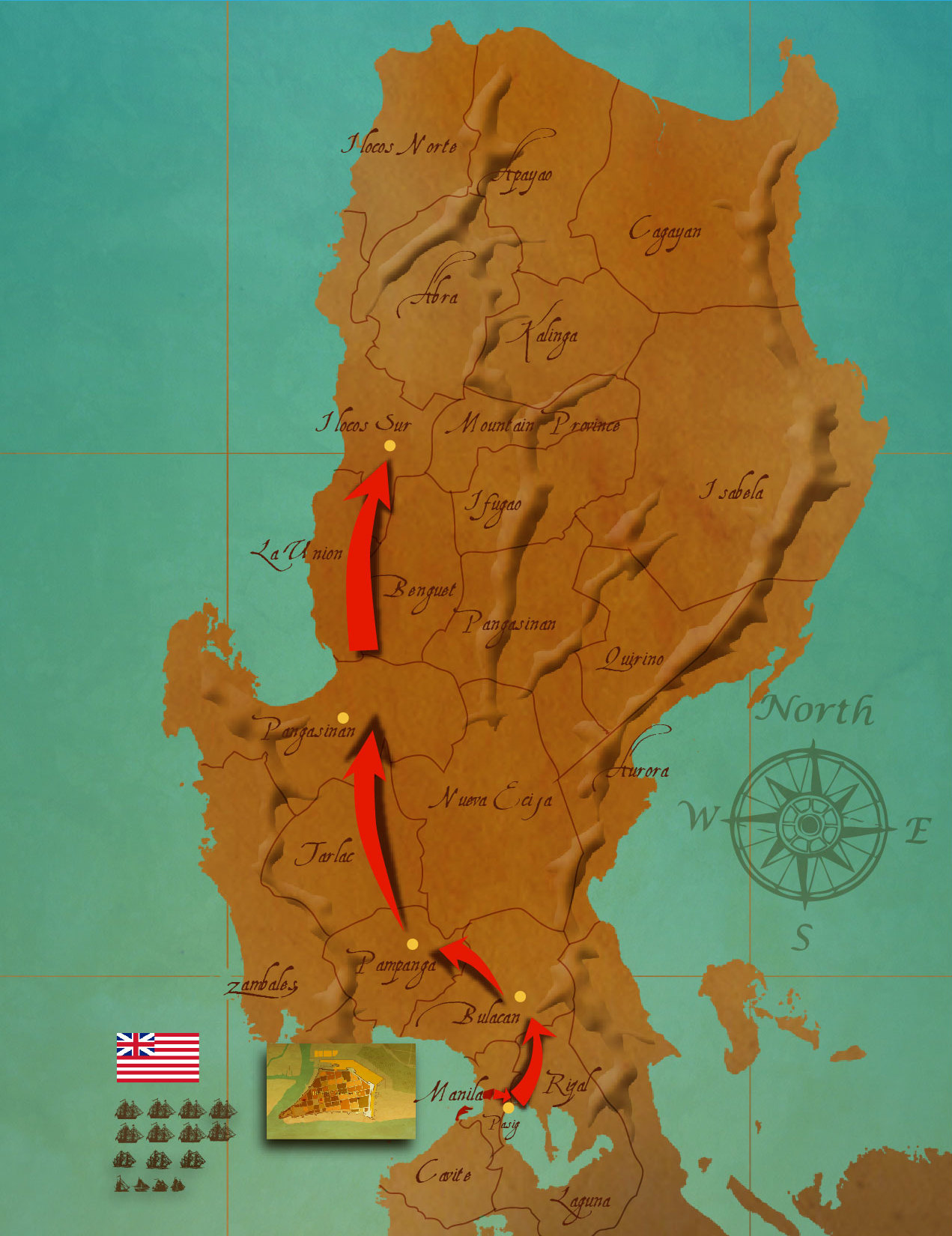
Map showing the chronological advance of British troops from Manila toward parts of Northern Luzon.

Once Manila was captured, "the soldiers turned to pillage." Rojo wrote that the sack actually lasted thirty hours or more, although he laid the blame on the Spanish, Chinese and Filipino denizens of Manila, as much as upon the marauding soldiers. Rojo described the events in his journal.

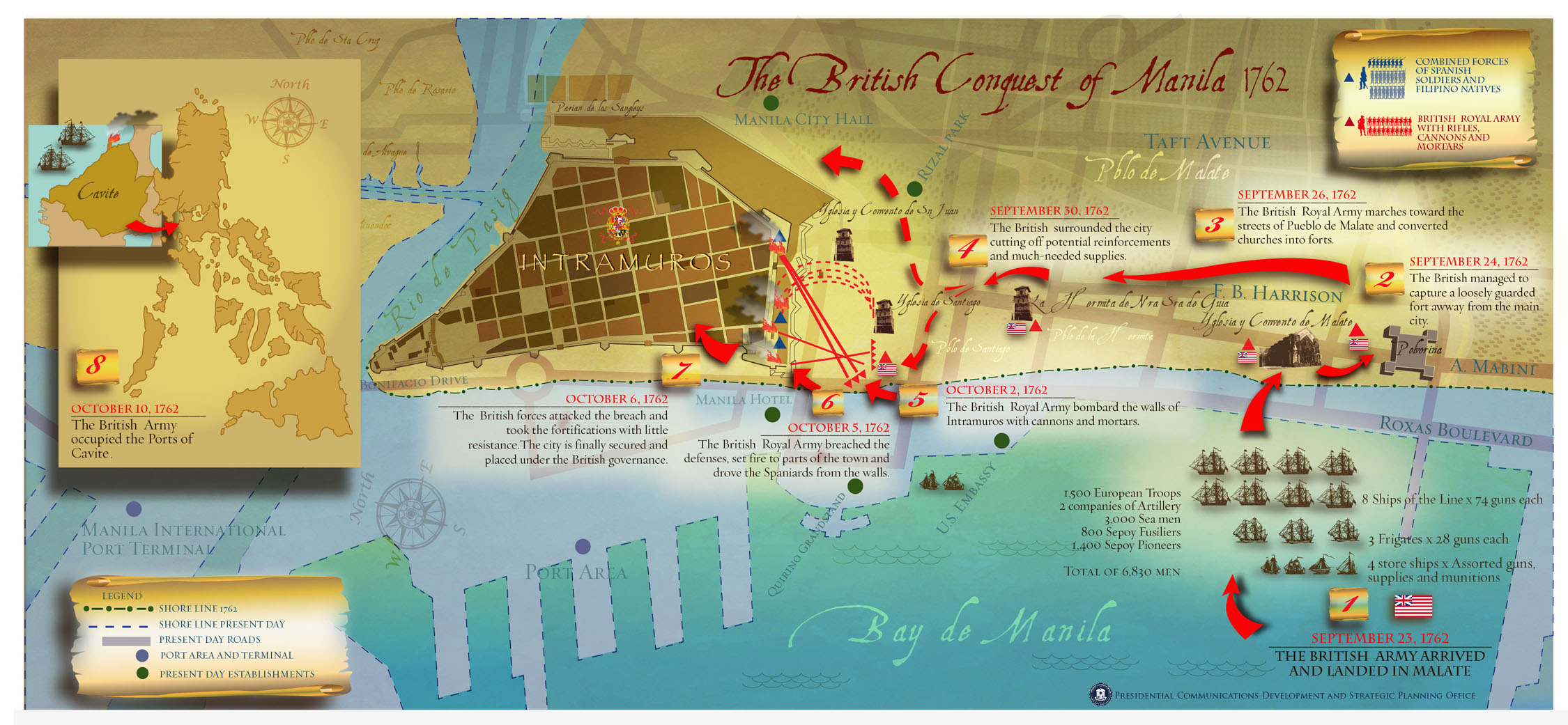
Map of the British conquest of Manila in 1762.

"The city was given over the pillage, which was cruel and lasted for forty hours, without excepting the churches, the archbishopric, and a part of the palace. Although the captain-general (Simon de Anda y Salazar) objected at the end of the twenty-four hours, the pillage really continued, in spite of the orders of the British general (Draper) for it to cease. Rojo himself killed with his own hands a [Spanish] soldier he found transgressing his orders, and had three hanged."

Drake then demanded a ransom from the Spanish authorities in exchange for agreeing to stop his troops from any further acts of pillage. Rojo agreed to the ransom, which amounted to four million Spanish dollars. By the time the British left, only a quarter of the ransom was paid, and the matter quietly dropped.

On 2 November 1762, Dawsonne Drake, an official of the East India Company, assumed office as the Governor of Manila. He was assisted by a council of four, consisting of John L. Smith, Claud Russel, Henry Brooke and Samuel Johnson. When after several attempts, Drake realised that he was not obtaining as many financial assets as he expected, he formed a war council which he termed the "Chottry Court". Drake imprisoned several Manilans on charges "only known to himself", according to Captain Thomas Backhouse, who denounced Drake's court as a sham. The British expedition was further rewarded after the capture of the Spanish treasure ship Filipina, carrying American silver from Acapulco, and in a battle off Cavite the Santísima Trinidad which carried a cargo of Chinese porcelain. The cargo of the Trinidad alone was valued at $1.5 million and the ship at $3 million.

=== Spanish Philippine resistance ===
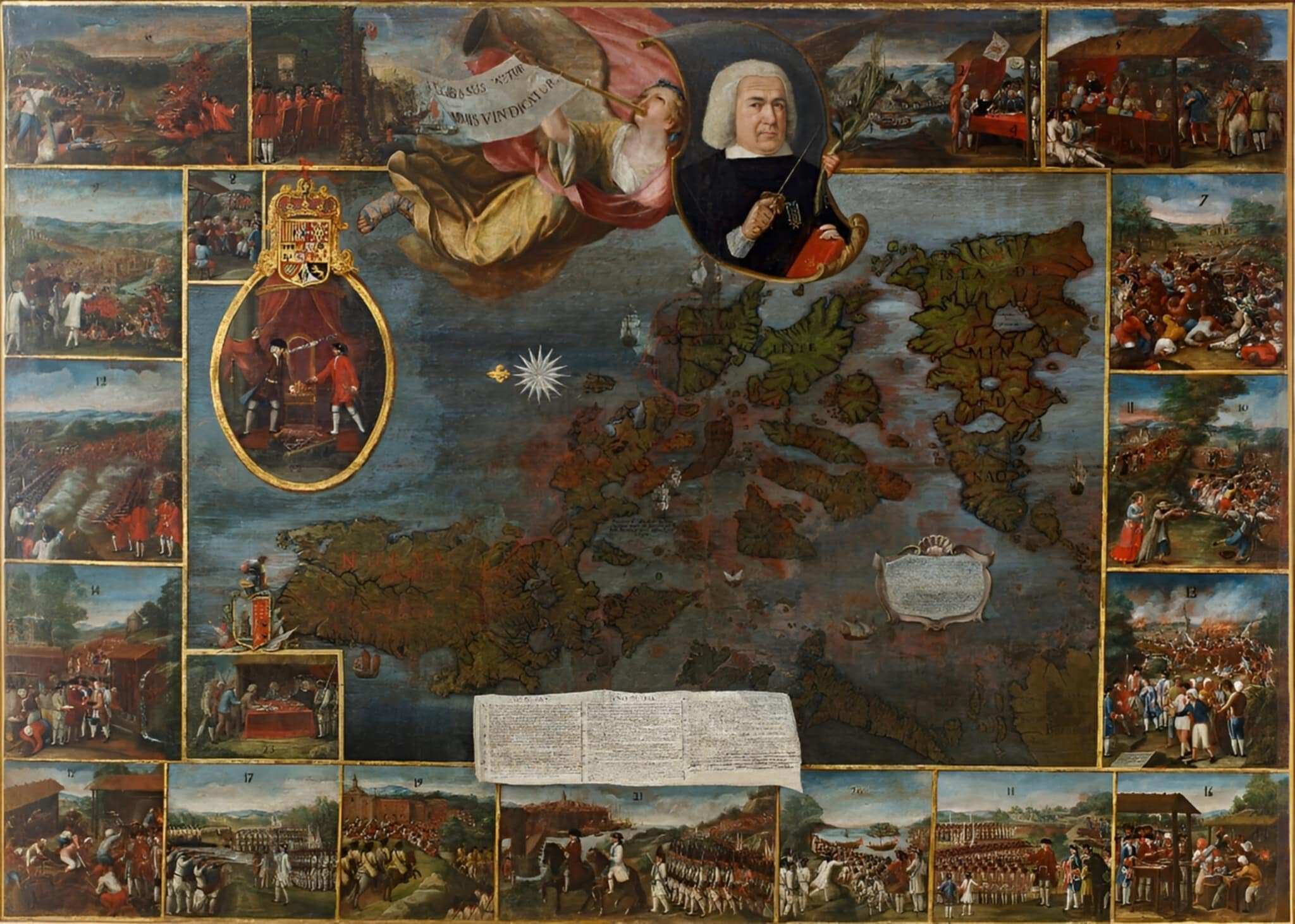
Spanish painting deputising "the Defense of the Philippines by Don Simón de Anda y Salazar"

In the meantime, the Royal Audience of Manila had organised a war council and dispatched Oidor Don Simón de Anda y Salazar to the provincial town of Bulacan to organise continued resistance to the British. The Real Audiencia also appointed Anda as Lieutenant Governor and Visitor-General. That night, Anda took a substantial portion of the treasury and official records with him, departing Fort Santiago through the postern of Our Lady of Solitude, to a boat on the Pasig River, and then to Bulacan. He moved headquarters from Bulacan to Bacolor, Pampanga, which was more secure, and quickly obtained the powerful support of the Augustinians. On 8 October 1762, Anda wrote to Rojo informing him that he had assumed the position of Governor and Capitan-General under the statutes of the Council of the Indies which allowed for the devolution of authority from the Governor to the Audiencia in cases of riot or invasion by foreign forces, as was the case presently. Anda, being the highest member of the Audiencia not under British control, assumed all powers and demanded the royal seal. Rojo declined to surrender it and refused to recognise Anda as Governor-General.

The surrender agreement between Archbishop Rojo and the British military guaranteed the Catholic Church and its episcopal government, secured private property, and granted the citizens of the former Spanish colony the rights of peaceful travel and of trade as British subjects. Under British control, the Philippines would continue to be governed by the Real Audiencia, the expenses of which were to be paid by Spain. Anda refused to recognise any of the agreements signed by Rojo as valid, claiming that the Archbishop had been made to sign them under duress, and therefore, according to the statutes of the Council of the Indies, they were invalid. He also refused to negotiate with the British until he was addressed as the legitimate Governor-General of the Philippines, returning to the British the letters that were not addressed to that effect. All of these initiatives were later approved by Charles III, who rewarded him and other members of the Audiencia, such as José Basco y Vargas, who had fought against the British. Anda eventually raised an army which amounted to over 10,000 combatants, most of them volunteer Filipinos, and although they lacked enough muskets to go around, they were successful in keeping the British largely confined to Manila and Cavite.

On 26 November, Captain Backhouse dispersed Anda's troops from Pasig and soon after, established a post, manned by lascars and sepoys so they could ensure their control of Laguna de Bay. Then on 19 January, the following year, the British sent an expedition commanded by Captain Sleigh against Bulacan which was reinforced by 400 Chinese civilians after Anda had ordered their executions for aiding the British. "In Bulacan alone 180 Chinese had been murdered in cold blood [by the Spanish] or had hanged themselves in fear." The British took Malolos on 22 January, but failed to advance upon Anda in Pampanga and withdrew from there on 7 February. In the spring of 1763, Backhouse undertook another expedition against Anda, advancing as far as Batangas.

Cornish and the East Indies Squadron departed in early 1763, leaving two frigates behind, HMS Falmouth and HMS Seaford. On 24 July, news arrived of the cessation of fighting and on 26 August a preliminary draft of the Peace of Paris. The treaty stated that "All conquests not known about at the time of the signing of the treaty were to be returned to the original owners." The impasse continued in Manila however, as the British order to withdraw would not arrive for another six months, and Anda reinforced his blockade of the city. "During the final winter of the British occupation all pretence of cooperation amongst the British leaders was abandoned."

=== Final months ===
The Seven Years' War ended with the signing of the Treaty of Paris on 10 February 1763. At the time of the signing, the signatories were not aware that Manila had been captured by the British, and consequently, it fell under the general provision that all other lands not otherwise provided for be returned to the Spanish Crown.

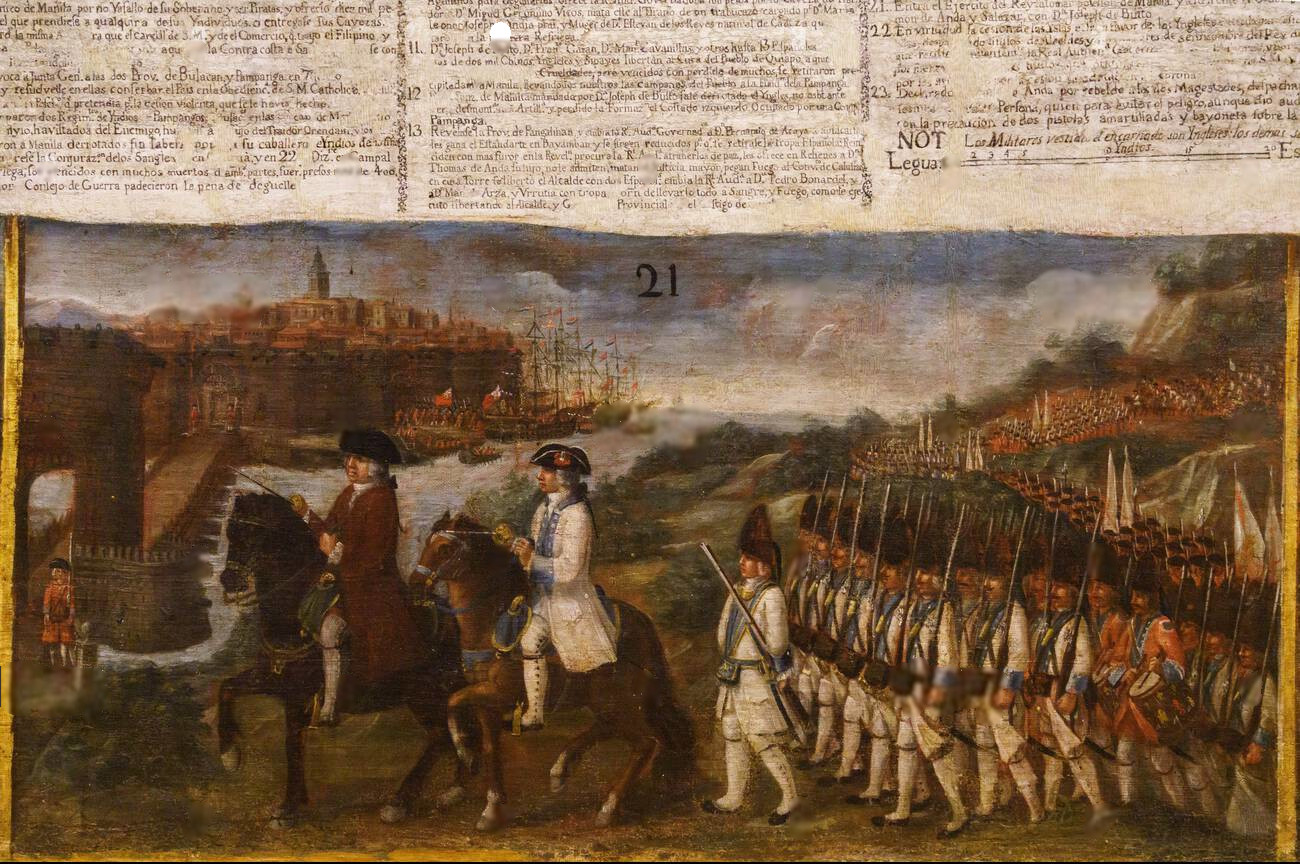
Filipino soldiers of the Spanish Empire led by Simon de Anda, retaking Manila after the British Empire returned Manila to the Captaincy General of the Philippines. Portrayed in Alegoría de la defensa de Filipinas.

After Archbishop Rojo died in January 1764, the British military finally recognised Simón de Anda y Salazar as the legitimate Governor of the Philippines, sending him a letter addressed to the "Real Audiencia Gobernadora y Capitanía General", after which Anda agreed to an armistice on the condition that the British forces withdraw from Manila by March. However, the British finally received their orders to withdraw in early March, and by mid-March the overdue Spanish governor for the Philippines, Brigadier Don Francisco de la Torre, finally arrived. This Spanish governor brought with him orders from London for Brereton and Backhouse to eventually hand over Manila to himself. Drake departed Manila on 29 March 1764, and the Manila Council elected Alexander Dalrymple Provisional Deputy Governor. The British ended the occupation by embarking from Manila and Cavite in the first week of April 1764. The 79th Regiment finally arrived in Madras on 25 May 1765.

== Aftermath ==
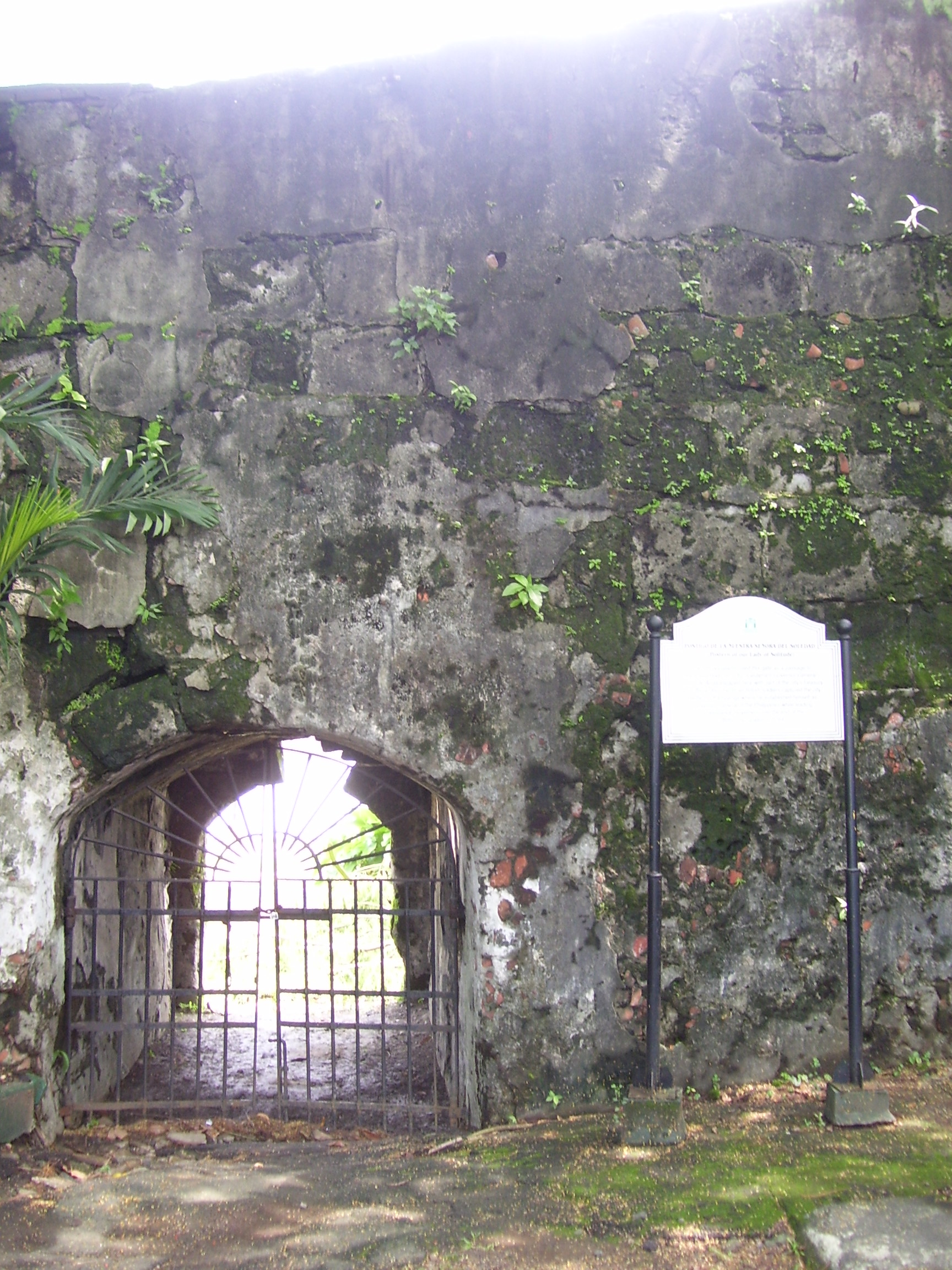
Postern of Our Lady of Solitude inside the Fort Santiago at Manila, through which on 5 October 1762, Lieutenant Governor Simón de Anda y Salazar escaped the British bombardment during the conquest of Manila.

Diego Silang, who was emboldened by Spanish vulnerability, was promised military assistance by the British if he began a revolt against the Spanish in the Ilocos Region, but such aid never materialised. Silang was later assassinated by his own friends, and the revolt was aborted after his wife, who had taken over the leadership, was captured and executed by the Spanish along with the remaining rebel forces. Sultan Azim ud-Din I of Sulu, who had signed a treaty of alliance with the British after they had freed him from Fort Santiago in Manila, where he had been imprisoned accused of treason, was also taken with the evacuating forces, in the hope that he could be of help to the aspirations of the East India Company in the Sultanate of Sulu. As British forces suffered increasing frustration and the unity of the commanders broke down, a number of Indian sepoys deserted and settled down in Pasig, Taytay, and Cainta.

The conflict over payment by Spain of the outstanding part of the ransom promised by Rojo in the terms of surrender, and compensation by Britain for the excesses committed by Drake in Manila, continued in Europe for years afterwards. The capture of the Spanish treasure galleons Santissima Trinidad and the Filipina made the expedition and the occupation rewarding more to the British government than the East India Company as well as representing a severe loss to Spain. However, the British failure to extend control beyond Manila and Cavite made their occupation's continuation unviable: Captain Backhouse reported to the Secretary of War in London, "the enemy [Spanish] are in full possession of the country".

The British had accepted the written surrender of the Philippines from Archbishop Rojo on 30 October 1762, but the Royal Audience of Manila had already appointed Simón de Anda y Salazar as the new Governor-General as provided for under the statutes of the Council of the Indies, as was pointed out by Anda and retrospectively confirmed by King Charles III of Spain, in his re-appointment of both Anda and Basco. It was not the first time that the Audiencia had assumed responsibility for the defence of the Philippines in the absence of a higher authority; in 1646, during the Battles of La Naval de Manila, it temporarily assumed the government and maintained the defence of the Philippines against a Dutch attack. As Francisco Leandro Viana, who was in Manila during the 18-month occupation, explained to King Charles III in 1765, "the English conquest of the Philippines was just an imagined one, as the English never owned any land beyond the range of the cannons in Manila."

The old Spanish maps Alexander Dalrymple took from Manila gave the British information about the Pacific, encouraging the quest for Terra Australis Incognita.

== See also ==
- History of the Philippines
- History of the Philippines (1565–1898)
- Great Britain in the Seven Years' War
- Siege of Havana

== Citations ==
=== References ===
- Danley, Mark; Speelman, Patrick (2012). The Seven Years' War: Global Views History of Warfare. Brill. ISBN 9789004236448.
- Fish, Shirley (2003), When Britain ruled the Philippines, 1762-1764: the story of the 18th century British invasion of the Philippines during the Seven Years War, 1stBooks Library, ISBN 978-1-4107-1069-7
- Draper, James (2006). Pitt's 'Gallant Conqueror': The Turbulent Life of Lieutenant General William Draper. I.B.Tauris. ISBN 9781845111779.

=== Additional sources ===
- Borschberg, P. (2004), Chinese Merchants, Catholic Clerics and Spanish Colonists in British-Occupied Manila, 1762-1764 in "Maritime China in Transition, 1750-1850", ed. by Wang Gungwu and Ng Chin Keong, Wiesbaden: Harrassowitz, pp. 355–372.
- Tracy, Nicholas (1995) Manila Ransomed: The British Assault on Manila in the Seven Years War. (University of Exeter Press). ISBN 9780859894265
