= Real Audiencia of Manila =

Spanish Empire entity

The Real Audiencia of Manila (Spanish: Real Audiencia de Manila) was the Real Audiencia of the Spanish East Indies, which included modern-day Guam, the Northern Mariana Islands, Palau, Micronesia and the Philippines. Similar to Real Audiencias throughout the Spanish Empire, it was the highest tribunal within the territories of the Captaincy General of the Philippines, a dependency of the Viceroyalty of New Spain.

The Governor-General of the Philippines was appointed as its highest judge, although on many occasions his absence forced other members to rule the tribunal and assume temporary civilian and military powers.

== History ==
When the Real Audiencia of Manila was established, a justice system already existed that was similar to the judicial and administrative systems of Spain and Latin America. Although the powers and functions of the Royal Audience of Manila were basically the same as those exercised by the other Audiencias, several factors, such as the threat of naval attack by the Dutch and the British and the dependence of the colony on the commerce of China, called for a different approach.

The Royal Audience of Manila was created by Royal Decree by King Felipe II dated 5 May 1583, and established in 1584. In the Viceroyalty of New Spain, to which it belonged, it had been preceded by the Real Audiencia of Santo Domingo (1511), the Real Audiencia of Mexico (1527), the Real Audiencia of Panama (1538), the Real Audiencia of Guatemala (1543), and the Real Audiencia of Guadalajara (1548).

Law XI (Audiencia y Chancillería Real de Manila en las Filipinas) of Title XV (De las Audiencias y Chancillerias Reales de las Indias) of Book II of the Recopilación de Leyes de las Indias of 1680—which compiles the original decree and the one of May 25, 1596—describes the limits and functions of the Audiencia and its President.

In the city of Manila on the Island of Luzon, Head of the Philippines, shall reside another Royal Audiencia and Chancellery of ours, with a president, who shall be governor and captain general; four judges of civil cases [oidores], who will also be judges of criminal cases [alcaldes del crimen]; a crown attorney [fiscal]; a bailiff [alguacil mayor]; a lieutenant of the Gran Chancellor; and the other necessary ministers and officials; and which shall have for district said Island of Luzon, and the rest of the Philippines, the Archipelago of China, and its Mainland, discovered and to be discovered. And we order that the governor and captain general of said Islands and Provinces, and president of their Royal Audiencia, have exclusively the superior government of the entire district of said Audiencia in war and peace, and shall make provisions and favors in our Royal Name, which in conformity to the laws of this Compilation and the rest of the Kingdoms of Castile and the instructions and powers that We shall grant, he should and can do; and in gubernatorial matters and cases that shall arise, that are of importance, said president-governor should consult on them with the judges of said Audiencia, so that they give their consultive opinions, and having heard them, he should provide the most convenient to the service of God and ours and the peace and tranquility of said Province and Republic.

Gómez Pérez Dasmariñas, seventh Spanish Governor-General of the Philippines, dissatisfied with the limits that the Audiencia imposed on his authority as a governor, dissolved the institution in 1590, and sent to Mexico all judges that composed the tribunal.

Governor-General Francisco Tello de Guzmán reestablished it in 1596.

== Jurisdictions of the Audiencia ==
Most of the laws dealing with the establishment of all 16th and 17th century Audiencias can be found in the Recopilación de Leyes de los Reynos de las Indias issued in 1680.

=== Civil jurisdiction ===
The Audiencia was given supervision over the administration of the estates of deceased persons. Special attention received the trials of cases involving states from native owners, and a provision was made that: "our said president and Oidores shall always take great care to be informed of the crimes and abuses which are committed against the Indians under our royal crown, or against those granted in encomiendas to other persons by the governors." The Audiencia was directed to exercise care that "the said Indians shall be better treated and instructed in our Holy Catholic Faith, as our free vassals." This was in conformance with the requirement to exercise great care in suits involving the local population, respecting their rites, customs, and practices to which they had always been accustomed. Appointed local government officials were ordered not to dispossess native chiefs of their rule or authority, and on the contrary, to appeal cases involving them without delay to the Audiencia, or to the visiting Oidor. The Audiencia was to devote two days a week to hearing suits to which Indians were parties. The fiscal, who acted as a prosecutor for the government and was the most important official directly connected with the tribunal, was also instructed to "take care to assist and favor poor Indians in the suits that they have, and to see that they are not oppressed, maltreated, or wronged."

Although it was commanded not to interfere with governors of provinces, it had the right, when charges had been made by private individuals, to conduct investigations on government officials. The Audiencia was also empowered to investigate the judges of provinces, and had the authority to try cases of appeal from local governors, town and city mayors, and other magistrates of the provinces; it also had jurisdiction over civil cases appealed from government officials of the city and original jurisdiction over all criminal cases arising within five leagues of the city of Manila.

Civil suits of sufficient importance could be appealed from the Audiencia to the Council of the Indies, that exercised supreme authority over all overseas territories, and acted as a last resort Supreme Court.

=== Government jurisdiction ===
The Audiencia exercised very pronounced authority over the services of public servants and government officials in the Philippines, and reported to the court all matters relative to the conduct, work, or attitude of any employee or official of the government. The Governor-General himself was forbidden to authorize extraordinary expenditures from the treasury without express royal permission, except in cases of riot or invasion.

Although the Governor-General had the right to make appointments in most departments of the government, except in the offices appointed directly by the Crown, the Audiencia imposed a very strict check on these appointments that was almost invariably a source of conflict throughout the history of the colonial government.

==== Oidores ====
The president of the Audiencia was empowered to delegate on the oidores to investigate about the correct administration of government and justice in the provinces. They were to note the state of the towns and their needs, the means taken for the construction and preservation of public buildings. Oidores were also required to check on the condition of the natives on the encomiendas and make sure they were faithfully and efficiently instructed and not permitted to live in ignorance and idolatry. They also had to make reports on the state of the soil, the condition of the crops and harvests, extent of mineral wealth and timber, and just about everything that had to do with the general welfare. On these trips the Oidores were authorized to take such action as they deemed to be necessary.

Oidores were forbidden to receive any fees from or to act as advocates for any private person, and they could not hold income-yielding estates in arable land or cattle. Oidores were also forbidden to engage in business, either singly or in partnership, nor could they avail themselves of the services of the natives. Any person could bring suit against an Oidor. The Audiencia was forbidden to act alone in the selection of the Judges, and magistrates were forbidden to hear cases affecting themselves or their relatives. No relative of the President or of an Oidor could be appointed legally to a government post. Criminal charges against the oidores were to be tried by the Governor-General, with the assistance of government officials fit to judge on the case.

=== Military jurisdiction ===
The Audiencia did assume responsibility for the defense of the Philippines on many occasions, such as in 1607, when it maintained the defense of Manila and Cavite against the Dutch, or between 1762 and 1764, when Oidor Simón de Anda y Salazar assumed military power on behalf of the Audiencia, organizing and maintaining a defense against the British who had invaded Manila, a move that was later approved by the King of Spain.

The Audiencia also assumed temporary military powers during the governments of Pedro Bravo de Acuña, Juan de Silva, Juan Niño de Tabora, Sebastian Hurtado de Corcuera (1635-1644) and Diego Fajardo Chacón, as they were engaged in lengthy military expeditions outside Manila.

==== Juicio de residencia ====
Among the most frequently complaints made against the Governor-General and his military subordinates was their abuse of power. In order to make all military personnel accountable for their actions a juicio de residencia (Trial of residence) was held at the end of their terms (although it could be held at any time, if deemed necessary).

This judicial trial was conducted by a judicial official, and it combined the features of a general survey of the career of the official under investigation, an auditing of his accounts and a formal trial. Its purpose was to ascertain whether or not the official had faithfully executed his duties and it served to clear him if he was found to have acted honestly, giving him a clean certificate of recommendation. If he was found guilty of official misconduct, dishonesty or any other crimes, he was apprehended, degraded, and punished, according to his wrongdoings.

Edward Gaylord Bourne described the process as extremely harsh: "It was designed to provide a method by which officials could be held to strict accountability for all. acts during their term of office. ... To allow a contest in the courts involving the governor s powers during his term of office would be subversive of his authority. He was then to be kept in bounds by realizing that a day of judgment was impending, when everyone, even the poorest Indian, might in perfect security bring forward his accusation. In the Philippines the Residencia for a governor lasted six months and was conducted by his successor and all the charges made were forwarded to Spain."

One of the most famous Residencia trials was that of Sebastián Hurtado de Corcuera, Governor-General from 1636 to 1644, who during his rule had managed to anger several personalities from the ecclesiastic, military and civilian hierarchies. Upon leaving office he had a particularly severe Juicio de Residencia after which he was sentenced to a prison term of which he served five years at Fort Santiago and made to pay a substantial fine.

Another Governor-General, Fausto Cruzat y Gongora, was convicted at the end of his term in 1701 for cheating on the native laborers. The Court concluded that "although the estimated cost of construction for the government house was 30,000 pesos, only 6,000 pesos were disbursed, the remainder representing what the natives contributed of their sweat and blood", at a time when one peso was the equivalent of the yearly salary of a native galleon builder in Cavite and a house could be bought for twenty pesos.

Jose Basco y Vargas, who first came to the Philippines during the administration of Governor Pedro Manuel de Arandia, as Oidor of the Audiencia, was also made to endure a Juicio de Residencia with charges brought against him in 1764, during which a review was made of his acts while as an Oidor he continued resistance once Manila had fallen during the brief British occupation of Manila, in defiance of the orders of Archbishop Rojo. His actions were not only approved, but he was also awarded high honors and promotions. On November 19, 1769, he was granted an annual pension of 3000 pesos for life. Basco y Vargas later went on to become the 44th Governor of the Philippines, ruling from 1778 until 1787.

=== Ecclesiastic jurisdiction ===
The Audiencia exercised both executive and judicial powers over the Church. The tribunal ruled over disputes between orders, between the government and the Church or any of its representatives, over cases relating to land titles, over abuses against the natives by representatives of the Church, and over cases involving the Jus patronatus. However the Audiencia was ordered to exercise its mandate without harming the rights and prerogatives of the church and to assist the prelates on all occasions when they petitioned for aid from the Spanish Crown.

Some other ecclesiastical affairs could also claim the attention of the Audiencia, such as the supervision over the assignment of benefices, and especially with the settlement of the property and estates of Bishops and Archbishops who had died in the Philippines.

=== Educational jurisdiction ===
The Audiencia of Manila also exercised its authority over the colleges and universities. Therefore, Oidores and fiscals were automatically excluded as candidates rectories. Instead, they were to make sure that the level of education in the universities, colleges and seminaries was up to approved standards, and that candidates for the licentiate did deserve the degree.

As early as 1585 the Jesuits had requested to establish a college in Manila, but although the Audiencia reported satisfactorily on the work of the Jesuit order, it concluded that there was no need to finance such a costly enterprise, granting only permission to establish the college of San Jose in 1601, that managed to maintain itself without royal aid until 1767. in 1648 the Jesuits asked again the Audiencia for the right to grant academic degrees at the newly upgraded University of Santo Tomas, and again their request was denied by the tribunal. However the Audiencia's ruling was overturned by the Council of the Indies in 1653. In 1769, after the expulsion of the Jesuits, the Audiencia tried for a time to administer San Jose, but a cedula was issued ordering to close down the college and transfer all existing students over to secular colleges and seminaries. The Audiencia then reported to the Council of the Indies on the transaction details that involved revenues derived from Jesuit properties, whose income was remitted to the Royal Treasury. The Archbishop of Manila tried to obtain the administration over all those properties and revenues, but it was stopped by the Audiencia. The Crown sustained the Audiencia's measures and forbade the prelate from trying to appropriate any of these assets.

=== District Audiencias ===
In 1893 two District Audiencias were established, one in Cebu and the other in Vigan. They were subordinated to Manila and only had jurisdiction over criminal cases on appeal.

== See also ==
- Captaincy General of the Philippines
- Council of the Indies
- Spanish Empire
- New Spain
- Spanish East Indies
