= Pedro Manuel de Arandía Santisteban =

Spanish knight and colonial official

Pedro Manuel de Arandía Santisteban (1699 in Ceuta – 1759 in Manila) was a Spanish knight and colonial official. He became the governor-general of the Philippines appointed from July 1754 to May 31, 1759.

== Life ==
Arandía was a native of Ceuta with lineage from the families of Biscay. He was a member of the Order of Calatrava and became the gentleman of the bedchamber to Charles III of Spain (V of Sicily). In 1754, he arrived in Manila as the new governor-general replacing the 1st Marquis of Brindisi.

During his governorship, he reformed the army and expelled infidel Chinese and built the Alcaicería (market) of San Fernando in Manila. He died in office and was replaced by the Bishop of Cebú Miguel Lino de Ezpeleta in 1759.

Political offices
Preceded by Marquis of Brindisi	Spanish Governor - Captain General of the Philippines; 1754–1759	Succeeded by Miguel Lino de Ezpeleta
