= Manuel Rojo del Río y Vieyra =

18th-century Archbishop of Manila

The Most Excellent and Most Reverend Lord Manuel Rojo del Río y Vieyra
- The Archbishop of Manila
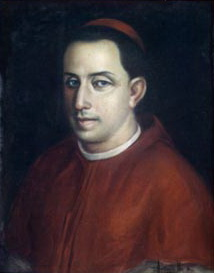
- See: Manila
- Installed: July 22, 1759
- Term ended: January 30, 1764
- Predecessor: Pedro José Manuel Martínez, O.F.M.
- Successor: Sancho de Santa Justa

Orders
- Consecration: January 29, 1748 by Manuel José Rubio y Salinas

Personal details
- Born: Manuel Antonio Rojo del Río y Vieyra; September 24, 1708 Tula de Allende, Viceroyalty of New Spain (now Hidalgo, Mexico)
- Died: January 30, 1764 (aged 55) Manila, Captaincy General of the Philippines
- Coat of arms: Manuel Rojo del Río y Vieyra's coat of arms
- Styles
- [[File:Coat of arms of Manuel Antonio Rojo del Rio Lafuente y Vieyra.svg

Governor-General of the Philippines
- In office July 1761 – January 30, 1764
- Monarch: Charles III of Spain
- Preceded by: Bishop Miguel Lino de Ezpeleta
- Succeeded by: Dawsonne Drake (in Manila); November 2, 1762; Simón de Anda y Salazar; January 31, 1764

Military service
- Battles/wars: Seven Years' War
- |60px]]
- Reference style: Monseñor
- Spoken style: Su Excelencia Reverendísima
- Religious style: Reverendísimo

Ordination history of Manuel Rojo del Río y Vieyra
History
Episcopal consecration
- Consecrated by: Archbishop Manuel José Rubio y Salinas

Manuel Antonio Rojo del Río y Vieyra (September 24, 1708 – January 30, 1764) was a Mexican (originally Spanish Criollo) friar who served as the 16th Archbishop of Manila and was Governor-General of the Philippines at the commencement of the 1762–1764 British occupation of the Philippines.

== Early life ==
Rojo del Río was born in Tula, Mexico on September 24, 1708. On 1758, he was consecrated archbishop of the Archdiocese of Manila.

On May 31, 1759, the death of Governor-General Pedro Manuél de Arandía left the position vacant. Bishop Miguel Lino de Ezpeleta of the Archdiocese of Cebu succeeded him as well as becoming acting Archbishop of Manila. On 22 July 1759, Rojo del Río was enthroned as Archbishop of Manila. In 1761, a royal decree from Spain ruled that Rojo del Río replace Ezpeleta to become Governor-General.

Del Río died in office on 20 January 1764.

== Governorship ==
"Albeit he had the gift of knowledge, he had no judgment, especially in matter military, to which he was hostile and negative, since this was an area outside his profession and character." This was to prove fatal during the capture of Manila.

== See also ==
- British occupation of Manila

Political offices
Preceded by Miguel Lino de Ezpeleta	Governor and Captain-General of the Philippines; 1761–1764	Succeeded by Dawsonne Drake as British Governor of Manila; 1762–1764
Preceded by Miguel Lino de Ezpeleta	Governor and Captain-General of the Philippines; 1761–1764	Succeeded by Simón de Anda y Salazar as Governor-General of the Philippines; 1764
Religious titles
Preceded by Pedro José Manuel Martínez, O.F.M.	Archbishop of Manila; 22 July 1759 – 30 January 1764	Succeeded by Basilio Hernando de Santa Justa, Sch. P.
