= Sovereignty of the Philippines =

Philippines as an independent nation-state

The sovereignty of the Philippines today rests with the independent Republic of the Philippines, established in 1987 by the 1987 Constitution of the Philippines. Prior, the Philippines was ruled as an unincorporated U.S. insular area since the suppression of the First Philippine Republic by the United States by virtue of the Treaty of Paris ratified in 1899 and which marked the end of the Spanish-American War. (Note: This was contested unsuccessfully by Japan during World War II.) Prior to the cession as well as the establishment of the Philippine Republic, the Philippines had been a colony of Spain since the numerous kingdoms and sultanates in the Philippine archipelago were unified under the Spanish Empire in the 1560s.

In August 1898, the Katipunan society initiated the Philippine Revolution, placing liberated towns under its administration. The society as a whole was led by Andres Bonifacio, but the leaders of the liberated towns in the province of Cavite chose to form a new revolutionary government, with Emilio Aguinaldo voted its president. During the course of the revolution. Aguinaldo was again elected as president at Biak-na-Bato in November 1897, leading the Biak-na-Bato Republic. Exiled in Hong Kong in accordance with the terms of the Pact of Biak-na-Bato, he returned to the Philippines during the Spanish–American War to renew revolutionary activities and, in May 1898, proclaimed a dictatorial government. On June 12, 1898, Aguinaldo's nascent government proclaimed independence from Spain. This proclamation was adhered to following the succeeding liberations of Philippine territory, which by the end of 1898 had freed almost the entire archipelago from Spanish rule. The Dictatorial Government was replaced by a Revolutionary Government, under which civil government and a representative legislature was established. This legislature drafted a democratic republican constitution promulgated in January 1899, establishing the First Philippine Republic.

Spanish nominal sovereignty was passed onto the United States by the Treaty of Paris, and the United States asserted the treaty by suppressing the Philippine Republic. American civil government was installed in the Philippines in 1902 and the Philippines continued as a U.S. territory until July 4, 1946, when the U.S. relinquished sovereignty and recognized the independence of the Republic of the Philippines. The current Philippine state traces its succession to the First Republic and considers Emilio Aguinaldo to have been the first President of the Philippines.

== Definition of sovereignty ==
As a practical matter, the question of sovereignty for the Philippines did not arise until near the end of the 19th century. The constitutive theory of statehood was developed in the 19th century to define what is and is not a state. With this theory, statehood depends on an entity's recognition by other countries. According to the theory's framework, the Philippines would still be considered Spanish or American territory in spite of the fact that an independent Philippine government had been established and effectively ruled the country until the American armed assertion of sovereignty.

The declarative theory of statehood, on the other hand, was developed long after the events of the Philippine-Spanish-American wars, but when applied to those events accounts for the fact that the sovereignty of Spain and the United States was merely nominal and would recognize the control that the Philippine Republic had in the islands as sovereignty.

Sovereignty over the Philippines as a whole ceased to be a contentious issue upon American recognition of Philippine independence via the Treaty of Manila, the first such recognition granted to the Philippines.

== Spanish period ==
=== Early contact ===
The first well documented arrival of western Europeans in the archipelago was the Spanish expedition led by Portuguese-born Spanish explorer Ferdinand Magellan, which first sighted the mountains of Samar at dawn on 16 March 1521 (Spanish calendar). Magellan sought friendship among the natives beginning with Humabon, the chieftain of Sugbu (now Cebu), and took special pride in converting them to Catholicism. His involvement with the native tribes eventually led to his death on 27 April 1521 in the Battle of Mactan.

After Magellan's voyage, subsequent Spanish expeditions were dispatched to the islands and, in 1543, Ruy López de Villalobos named the islands of Leyte and Samar Las Islas Filipinas after Philip II of Spain. The single surviving vessel from Magellan's fleet, the Victoria, returned to Spain in 1522, after which Spain claimed dominion over the Philippine archipelago on the basis of discovery, a valid mode of acquisition at the time.

=== Spanish conquest ===
On April 27, 1565, Spanish conquistadores attacked the defiant Rajah Tupas, who had succeeded Rajah Humabon as king of Cebu. Tupas was defeated and made to sign an agreement after his defeat, effectively placing the Philippines under Spain. On February 8, 1597, King Philip II, near the end of his 42-year reign, issued a Royal Cedula instructing to Francisco de Tello de Guzmán, then Governor-General of the Philippines in severe terms to fulfill the laws of tributes and to provide for restitution of ill-gotten taxes imposed on the natives. The Cedula also decreed an undertaking by which the natives (referred to as Indians), "... freely render to me submission."

The decree was published in Manila on August 5, 1598. King Philip died on September 13, forty days after the publication of the decree. His death was not known in the Philippines until middle of 1599, by which time a referendum by which the natives would acknowledge Spanish rule was underway. With the completion of the Philippine referendum of 1599, Spain could be said to have established legitimate sovereignty over the Philippines.

=== Spanish rule ===
During Spain's 333-year rule in the Philippines, the colonists had to fight off Chinese pirates (who lay siege to Manila, the most famous of which was Limahong in 1574), Dutch forces, and Portuguese forces. Muslim Moros from western Mindanao and the Sulu Archipelago constantly raided the coastal Christian areas of Luzon and the Visayas and occasionally brought home loot and abducted women. They often sold their captives as slaves.

A British conquest of the Spanish Philippines occurred during the Seven Years' War, with British occupation of Manila between 1762 and 1764. There were also a number of failed Philippine revolts during Spanish rule.

=== The Katipunan ===
On July 7, 1892, the day that Filipino leader José Rizal was exiled to Dapitan, Andrés Bonifacio, Teodoro Plata, Ladislao Diwa, and others founded the Katipunan, a secret organization whose goal was to forcibly end Spanish rule. Its discovery in 1896 by the Spanish colonial government led to the outbreak of Philippine Revolution.

Upon the outbreak of the Revolution, the Katipunan established early independent governments in the country, with its branches assuming the powers of local government in liberated towns.

Upon the complete liberation of the province of Cavite, the Tejeros Convention was held by the two dominant Katipunan branches, the Magdiwang and Magdalo to establish a new revolutionary government. Emilio Aguinaldo was elected to the office of President. Bonifacio, as chairman of the convention and President of the Katipunan, voided the convention proceedings, but Aguinaldo (who had not been present at the convention) took his oath of office as president the next day in Santa Cruz de Malabon (present-day Tanza) in Cavite. A leadership conflict ensued, culminating in the arrest and execution of Bonifacio. Aguinaldo continued revolutionary operations through the new government. A Spanish offensive that had recaptured Cavite forced Aguinaldo northward to Biak-na-Bato, where, on November 1, 1897, a constitution written by Felix Ferrer and Isabelo Archero established the Republic of Biak-na-Bato, with Aguinaldo as president.

On December 14–15, 1897, the Pact of Biak-na-Bato suspended the revolution, with Aguinaldo and other Katipunan leaders agreeing to go into voluntary exile abroad. General Francisco Makabulos of Tarlac, a Katipunan leader who did not go into exile, established the Central Executive Committee, which was intended to be a provisional government "until a general government in these islands shall again be established." This rebel government had a constitution, popularly called the constitution of Makabulos, which provided for an executive committee composed of a President, Vice President and Secretary of the Interior.

== Spanish–American War period ==
=== American hostilities, Aguinaldo's return, Dictatorial government ===
After the Philippines became a theater of operations in the Spanish–American War, with hostilities commencing on May 1, 1898, with the Battle of Manila Bay, Aguinaldo and others returned from exile to the Philippines in order to resume their revolution against the Spanish colonial government. On May 24, in the wake of his military victories, Aguinaldo announced that he was assuming "command of all the troops in the struggle for the attainment of our lofty aspirations, inaugurating a dictatorial government to be administered by decrees promulgated under my sole responsibility...".

On June 18, he issued a decree formally establishing a Dictatorial Government. This was done under the authority of the Biak-na-Bato republic, nullifying orders issued prior to the signing of the Pact of Biak-na-Bato and asserting that the Dictatorial Government was temporary in nature, "... so that, when peace shall have been reestablished and our legitimate aspiration for unrestricted liberty attained, it may be modified by the nation, in which rests the principle of authority."

=== U.S. military government ===
On August 14, 1898, following the August 12 capture of Manila, the U.S. had established a military government in the Philippines under General Merritt as military governor. During military rule (1898–1901), the U.S. military commander governed the Philippines under the authority of the U.S. president as commander-in-chief of the U.S. armed forces. General Otis succeeded General Merritt as military governor, governing from 1898 to 1900. General Otis was succeeded by General MacArthur, who governed from 1900 to 1901.

On July 24, 1898, the Spanish Peninsular Government had replaced Governor-General Basilio Augustín with Fermín Jáudens (acting). On August 13, 1898, Jáudens was replaced by Francisco Rizzo (acting), who was replaced in September 1898 by Diego de los Ríos (acting).

On August 13, with American commanders unaware that a peace protocol had been signed between Spain and the United States on the previous day in Washington, D.C., American forces captured the city of Manila from the Spanish. The next day, August 14, U.S. military government was established with Major General Wesley Merritt as the first military governor. General Merritt received news of the August 12 peace protocol on August 16, three days after the surrender of Manila. In early December 1898, General Rios moved the Spanish Philippine capital from Manila to Iloilo. On December 24, Rios and the Spanish garrison departed Iloilo after being driven out by revolutionaries.

=== Philippine declaration of independence, Revolutionary government ===
On June 12, 1898, the Philippines was proclaimed as a sovereign entity, wholly separate from Spain, by the Philippine Declaration of Independence upon order of Emilio Aguinaldo at his mansion in Kawit, Cavite. The proclamation was made with the understanding that the independence thus proclaimed was to be adhered to by the successively liberated territories that were placed under revolutionary governance, which was consummated by further ratifications of independence by civilian representatives.

On July 23, 1898, the Dictatorial Government was replaced by the Revolutionary Government. As provinces were succeedingly liberated and placed under the new government, civil government was established at the local and provincial levels, and provinces close enough to the new capital of Malolos could elect and send deputies to a Revolutionary Congress. Those constituencies that could not send deputies were represented by appointed deputies.

After promulgating the revolutionary government, Aguinaldo created diplomatic positions abroad in order to persuade foreign powers to recognize Philippine independence and promulgated decrees creating committees abroad for the purpose of carrying on propaganda activities. He issued decrees on June 24 and August 10 establishing the Hongkong Junta whose members were to represent the Philippines in different countries.

An August 24 decree created a revolutionary committee in foreign countries. Diplomatic agents were appointed for the U.S., Japan, England, France, and Australia. The Paris Committee and Madrid Committee were created to work for the recognition of Philippine independence by France and Spain.

By December 1898, the Revolutionary Government had under its governance the entire island of Luzon (apart from American-controlled Manila), the Visayas through a federal state with a cantonal subdivision, and the Christianized provinces in Mindanao, with further liberations in this area occurring into the January 1899.

=== Treaty of Paris ===
By December 28, Spanish troops had evacuated all garrisons in the south Philippines except Zamboanga and Jolo. Initially, Rios relocated the Spanish capital to Zamboanga, but on January 1 or 2, 1899, he relocated it again, this time back to Manila, where he could more effectively seek the release of Spanish POWs. On January 4, 1899, U.S. General Elwell Otis issued a proclamation announcing that the United States had obtained the former Spanish control over the Philippines.

As a consequence of its defeat, Spain transferred its rights over the Philippine archipelago to the U.S., the existence of the Revolutionary Government notwithstanding. On December 10, 1898, the Treaty of Paris was signed between Spain and the United States, ending the Spanish–American War. In article III of this treaty, Spain ceded the Philippines to the United States.

Felipe Agoncillo, who had been assigned by Aguinaldo as Ambassador to the United States, had traveled to Paris but had been refused admission to the conference. He worked hard to prevent the ratification of the treaty by Spain, but failed. Returning to Paris, he sent a message to Aguinaldo about the refusal of the United States and other foreign powers to recognize the independence of the Philippines. Spain finally relinquished title over the Philippine islands in the aftermath of the Spanish–American War, when the U.S. emerged as the victor when the Treaty of Paris was signed in Paris on December 10, 1898, which ceded the archipelago to the U.S. By this time, nominal sovereignty lay with the United States, while effective sovereignty was exercised by the Revolutionary Government.

== First Philippine Republic and Philippine–American War ==
=== First Philippine Republic ===
On January 21, 1899, the promulgation of the Malolos Constitution replaced the revolutionary government with the democratic First Philippine Republic, which continued to exercise de facto sovereignty in Filipino-controlled areas.

Felipe Agoncillo had gone to the U.S. to work for American recognition and secured an audience with U.S. President William McKinley, but was merely received as a private citizen and not as a representative of Aguinaldo. He sailed to Europe to appeal to the American Peace Commissioners there to negotiate the Treaty of Paris, but failed in this as well. He returned to the U.S. to fight the ratification of the treaty. On February 4, 1899, with Agoncillo in the U.S., general hostilities erupted between U.S. and Filipino forces, beginning what later came to be known as the Philippine–American War. With the eruption of hostilities, Agoncillo fled the U.S.

That same day, Aguinaldo issued an order commanding "... That peace and friendly relations with the Americans be broken and that the latter be treated as enemies, ..." On March 30, U.S. Forces captured Malolos, Bulacan, which had been the seat of Aguinaldo's various governments. Meanwhile, Aguinaldo had evacuated and established new headquarters in San Isidro, Nueva Ecija. By June, Aguinaldo had moved his headquarters to Cabanatuan where, on June 2, a Declaration of War on the United States was officially proclaimed.

The treaty between Spain and the U.S. completed ratification on April 11, 1900, and Spanish sovereignty over the Philippines passed to the U.S. On March 23, 1901, after about two years of war, Aguinaldo was captured in Palanan, Isabela. On April 1, 1901, Aguinaldo swore an oath accepting the authority of the United States over the Philippines and pledging his allegiance to the American government. On April 19, 1901, Aguinaldo published a manifesto acknowledging that most of the Filipino people had united around the United States, declaring "unmistakably in favor of peace", and saying, "a complete termination of hostilities and lasting peace are not only desirable, but absolutely essential to the welfare of the Philippine Islands." In this manifesto, he acknowledged and accepted U.S. sovereignty throughout the Philippines.

== U.S. civil government of the Philippines ==
After Aguinaldo swore allegiance to the U.S., the U.S. military government was replaced by a civil government under the second Philippine Commission on July 4, 1901.

Scattered fighting continued for some time but the U.S. enacted the Philippine Organic Act on July 1, 1902, and, on July 4, U.S. President Theodore Roosevelt proclaimed a full and complete pardon and amnesty to all people in the Philippine archipelago who had participated in the conflict, effectively ending the war.

In 1916, the Philippine Autonomy Act, popularly known as the Jones Law, was passed by the U.S. Congress. The law, which served as the new organic act (or constitution) for the Philippines, stated in its preamble that the eventual independence of the Philippines would be American policy, subject to the establishment of a stable government. The law maintained the Governor General of the Philippines, appointed by the President of the United States, but established a bicameral Philippine Legislature to replace the elected Philippine Assembly (lower house) and appointive Philippine Commission (upper house) previously in place.

Numerous independence bills were submitted to the U.S. Congress, and the Hare–Hawes–Cutting Act became U.S. law on January 17, 1932. The law required ratification by the Philippine Senate, which was not forthcoming. Philippine President Quezon led a twelfth independence mission to Washington to secure a better independence act. The result was the Philippines Independence Act, more popularly known as the "Tydings–McDuffie Act", of 1934, which was ratified by the Philippine Senate. The law provided for the granting of Philippine independence by 1946.

The Tydings-McDuffie Act specified a procedural framework for the drafting of a Constitution for the government of the Commonwealth of the Philippines within two years of its enactment and mandated U.S. recognition of independence of the Philippine Islands as a separate and self-governing nation after a ten-year transition period.. On May 5, 1934, the Philippines legislature passed an act setting the election of convention delegates. Governor General Frank Murphy designated July 10 as the election date, and the convention held its inaugural session on July 30. The completed draft constitution was approved by the convention on February 8, 1935, approved by U.S. President Franklin Roosevelt on March 23, and ratified by popular vote on May 14. The first election under the constitution was held on September 17, and on November 15, 1935, the Commonwealth government was inaugurated.

== Commonwealth period ==
The period 1935–1946 would ideally be devoted to the final adjustments required for a peaceful transition to full independence, a great latitude in autonomy being granted in the meantime.

On May 14, 1935, an election to fill the newly created office of President of the Commonwealth of the Philippines was won by Manuel L. Quezon (Nacionalista) and a Filipino government was formed on the basis of principles superficially similar to the US Constitution. (See: Philippine National Assembly).

== Japanese occupation during World War II ==
A few hours after the Japanese attack on Pearl Harbor on December 7, 1941, the Japanese launched air raids in several cities and US military installations in the Philippines on December 8, and on December 10, and Manila was occupied by the Japanese on January 2, 1942. The Commonwealth government by then had become a Government in exile seated in Washington, D.C., upon the invitation of U.S. President Roosevelt. Philippine President Manuel L. Quezon had declared Manila, the capital, an "open city" and left it under the rule of Jorge B. Vargas, as mayor.

The Japanese entered Manila on January 2, 1942, and established it as the capital. Japan fully captured the Philippines on May 6, 1942, after the Battle of Corregidor. The Second Philippine Republic was established on October 14, 1943, under Japanese occupation and endured until the end of the war, it was repudiated and the government of the Commonwealth of the Philippines restored.

== Recognition of independence ==
In accordance with the Tydings–McDuffie Act, President Harry S. Truman issued Proclamation 2695 of July 4, 1946, officially recognizing the independence of the Philippines.

On the same day, the Treaty of Manila between the governments of the United States and the Philippines was signed. The treaty provided for the recognition of the independence of the Republic of the Philippines and the relinquishment of American sovereignty over the Philippine Islands.

During the interim since the end of the 19th century, the constitutive theory of statehood had given way to the declarative theory of statehood. The Montevideo Convention (1933), which defined the theory, states:

The state as a person of international law should possess the following qualifications: (a) a permanent population; (b) a defined territory; (c) government; and (d) capacity to enter into relations with the other states.

== Post-independence territorial changes ==
In 1961, the Philippines enacted Republic Act No. 3046 (RA3446), to define the baselines of the territorial sea of the Philippines. This Act was amended on September 18, 1968, by RA5446, and on March 10, 2009, by RA9522.

Presidential Proclamation No. 1596 had asserted Philippine sovereignty over the Spratly Islands on June 11, 1978. RA9522 reasserted that, and also asserted Philippine sovereignty over Scarborough Shoal.

On April 8, 2009, the Philippines lodged a partial territorial waters claim with the United Nations Commission on the Limits of the Continental Shelf (UNCLCS) in relation to the continental shelf in the region of Benham Rise. On April 28, 2012, Ramon Paje, director of the Philippine Department of Environment and Natural Resources announced that the claim had been approved by the United Nations Convention on the Law of the Sea (UNCLOS).

== Independence Day holiday ==
From 1946 to 1961, July 4 (the anniversary date of the Treaty of Manila), was observed as Independence Day. On May 12, 1962, Philippine President Diosdado Macapagal issued Presidential proclamation No. 28, which declared Tuesday, June 12, 1962 (the anniversary date of the 1898 Philippine Declaration of Independence) as a special public holiday throughout the Philippines, "... in commemoration of our people's declaration of their inherent and inalienable right to freedom and independence. " On August 4, 1964, Republic Act No. 4166 renamed the July 4 holiday as "Philippine Republic Day" (it was delisted as a public holiday in 1987), proclaimed the twelfth day of June as the Philippine Independence Day, and enjoined all citizens of the Philippines to observe June 12 with rites befitting Independence Day.

== Philippine Supreme Court statements regarding sovereignty ==
During the period when the military government exercised administrative control, the Taft Commission (created on March 16, 1900) exercised legislative powers. On June 11, 1901, the commission had passed the Judiciary Law (Act no. 126), vesting judicial power in the Supreme Court, Courts of First Instance and Justice of the Peace courts.

At least two cases decided by the Philippine Supreme Court under American sovereignty refer to the transferral of sovereignty from Spain to the United States.

- In United States v. Smith, the Philippine Supreme Court wrote that a complete separation of Church and State had been caused by the change of sovereignty from Spain to the United States.
- In Philippines vs. Lo-Lo and Saraw, the court said, more clearly, "By the Treaty of Paris, Spain ceded the Philippine Islands to the United States."

Post-recognition of independence, the Supreme Court has explicitly traced the continuation of the Philippine state to the First Republic:

- In Pamil v. Teleron, the Supreme Court established the Malolos Constitution as a previous Philippine constitution "even before the establishment of the American colonial rule".
- In Poe-Llamanzares v. COMELEC, the Supreme Court further developed the current state's succession from the First Republic by explicitly considering the Malolos Constitution, particularly its provisions on citizenship, as having been a part of the Philippine body of laws.

== Disputes and challenges to sovereignty ==
=== Island of Palmas ===
The island of Palmas, also referred to as Miangas, is located in the Celebes Sea south of Mindanao, at approximately 5°33′30″N, 127°12′53° E. The island lies within the geographical area described by Article III of the Treaty of Paris as encompassing the Philippine archipelago and ceded by Spain to the U.S. The Island of Palmas Case was a territorial dispute between the Netherlands and the United States which was heard by the Permanent Court of Arbitration. The arbitrator ruled on April 4, 1928, that the island forms in its entirety a part of Netherlands territory.

=== Spratly Islands ===
The Spratly Islands, also known as the Kalayaan Islands, are a group of more than 650 reefs, islets, atolls, cays and islands in the South China Sea between the Philippines, China, Malaysia, Brunei, and Vietnam. They comprise less than five square kilometers of land area, spread over more than 400,000 square kilometers of sea. A number of sovereignty disputes regarding these islands have arisen, some of which remain unresolved as of 2009.

=== Sabah and Palawan ===
The North Borneo dispute, also known as the Sabah dispute, is the territorial dispute between Malaysia and the Philippines over much of the eastern part of Sabah a Malaysian state located on the northern portion of the island of Borneo. Sabah was known as North Borneo prior to the formation of the Malaysian federation. In the Manila Accord, signed on 31 July 1963, the governments of the Philippines, Indonesia, and Malaysia agreed to establish machinery for frequent and regular consultations regarding this and other matters of common interest. These consultations did not result in resolution of the dispute, and the Philippines proposed for a judicial settlement through the International Court of Justice. However, as of 2020, Great Britain and the Federation of Malaysia, had not agreed. Also, territorial cessations made by the Sultan of Sulu have led to sovereignty disputes over the Philippine island of Palawan. The dispute is ongoing.

== See also ==
- Timeline of Philippine political history
- Foreign relations of the Philippines

== Bibliography ==
- Agoncillo, Teodoro A.; Milagros, Guerrero (1970), History of the Filipino People, Malaya Books.
- Agoncillo, Teodoro A. (1990), History of the Filipino People (Eighth ed.), University of the Philippines, ISBN 971-8711-06-6.
- Bautista, Lowell B. (September 3, 2009), "The Historical Context and Legal Basis of the Philippine Treaty Limits" (PDF), Aegean Review of the Law of the Sea and Maritime Law, doi:10.1007/s12180-009-0003-5, ISSN 1864-9610, S2CID 153653227, archived from the original (PDF) on October 11, 2010.
- Halstead, Murat (1898), The Story of the Philippines and Our New Possessions, Including the Ladrones, Hawaii, Cuba and Porto Rico.
- Hillier, Tim (1998), "Sourcebook on public international law", Cavendish Publishing sourcebook series, Routledge, ISBN 978-1-85941-050-9.
- M. Huber (April 4, 1928), THE ISLAND OF PALMAS CASE (OR MIANGAS), UNITED STATES OF AMERICA V. THE NETHERLANDS, AWARD OF THE TRIBUNAL, The Hague: PERMANENT COURT OF ARBITRATION, p. 29, archived from the original (MS Word) on August 21, 2012.
- Guevara, Sulpico, ed. (2005), The laws of the first Philippine Republic (the laws of Malolos) 1898–1899., Ann Arbor, Michigan: University of Michigan Library (published 1972) (English translation by Sulpicio Guevara).
- Ileto, Reynaldo Clemeña (1997), Pasyon and revolution: popular movements in the Philippines, 1840–1910 (4th ed.), Ateneo de Manila University Press, ISBN 978-971-550-232-0.
- Kalaw, Maximo Manguiat (1927), The Development of Philippine Politics, Oriental commercial, pp. 413–417.
- Ko, Swan Sik (1990), Swan Sik Ko (ed.), Nationality and international law in Asian perspective, Martinus Nijhoff Publishers, p. 339, ISBN 978-0-7923-0876-8.
- Ongsotto, Rebecca Ramilo; Ongsotto, Reena R. (2002), Philippine History Module-based Learning I, Rex Bookstore, ISBN 9789712334498.
- Peterson, Don, 1898: Five Philippine Governors-General Serve Rapid Fire Terms (PDF), Philippine Philatelic Journal
- Sagmit, Rosario S.; Sagmit-Mendosa, Lourdes (2007), The Filipino Moving Onward 5 (2007 ed.), Rex Bookstore, Inc., ISBN 978-971-23-4154-0.
- Scott, William Henry (1985), Cracks in the Parchment Curtain, New Day Publishers, ISBN 971-10-0074-1.
- Villarroel, Fidel (2009), "Philip II and the "Philippine Referendum" of 1599", in Ramírez, Dámaso de Lario (ed.), Re-shaping the World: Philip II of Spain and His Time (illustrated ed.), Ateneo de Manila University Press, ISBN 978-971-550-556-7.
- Worcester, Dean Conant (1914), The Philippines: Past and Present (vol. 1 of 2), Kessinger, ISBN 1-4191-7715-X.
- Zaide, Sonia M. (1994), The Philippines: A Unique Nation, All-Nations Publishing Co., ISBN 971-642-071-4 (with Gregario F. Zaide's History of the Republic of the Philippines).
