= Battle of Manila (1898) =

Part of the Spanish-American War

Coordinates: 14°35′N 121°0′E

- Part of the Spanish–American War and the Philippine Revolution
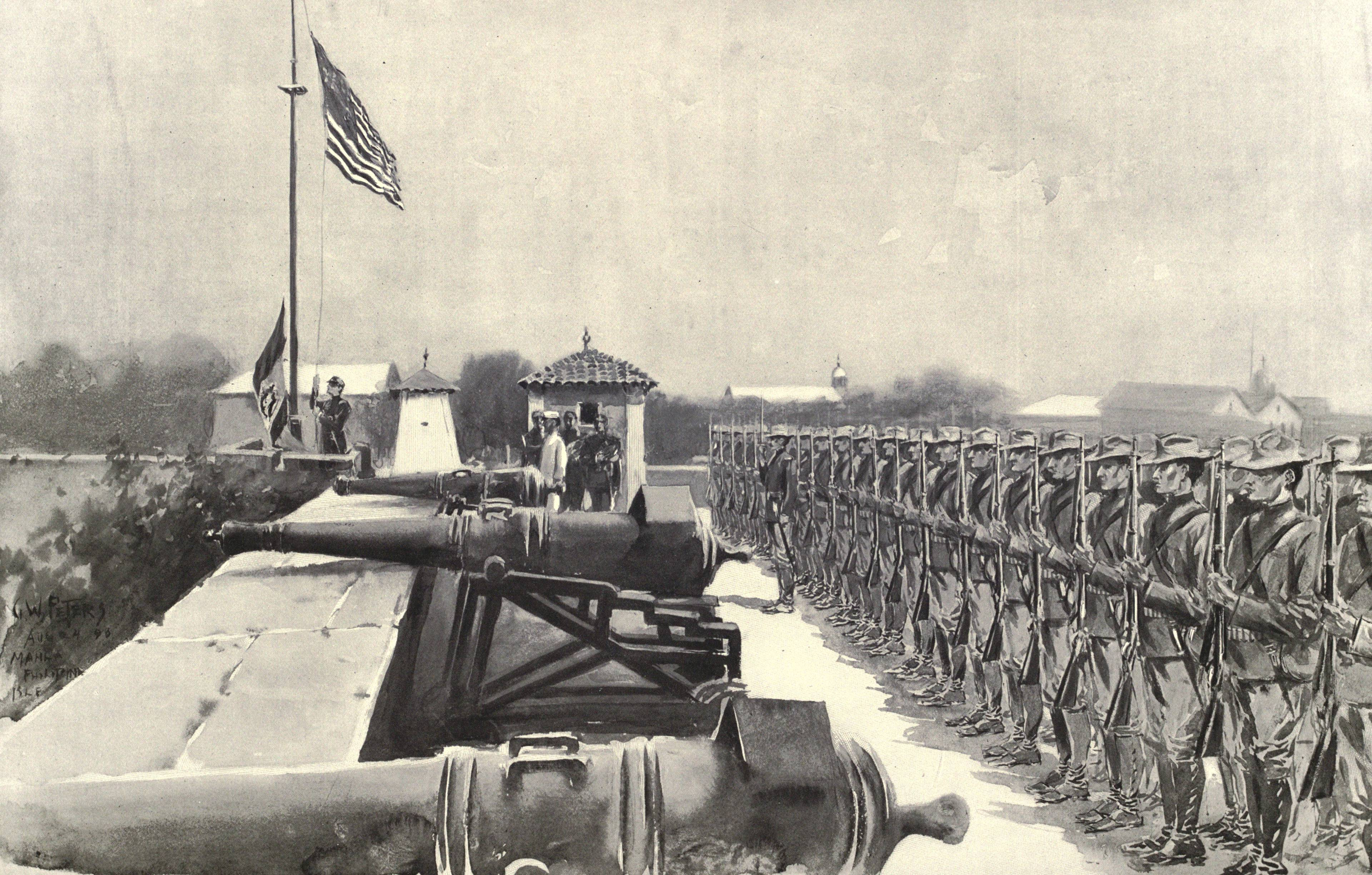
- "Raising the American flag over Fort Santiago, Manila, on the evening of August 13, 1898." drawing from Harper's Pictorial History of the War with Spain.
| Date | August 13, 1898 |
| Location | Manila, Philippines |
| Result | Filipino-American victory |
| Territorial changes | Establishment of the United States Military Government of the Philippine Islands |

Belligerents
| United States; Revolutionary Government of the Philippines | Spain: Captaincy General of the Philippines |

Commanders and leaders
| Wesley Merritt; Arthur MacArthur Jr. George Dewey; Emilio Aguinaldo; Artemio Ricarte; Antonio Luna; Mariano Noriel; Pio del Pilar; Pantaleon Garcia; Gregorio del Pilar | Fermin Jáudenes; Basilio Augustín |

Strength
| 10,700; 40,000 | 13,000 |

Casualties and losses
| 19 killed, 103 wounded | 49 killed, 1 fort |

The Battle of Manila (Filipino: Labanan sa Maynila; Spanish: Batalla de Manila), sometimes called the Mock Battle of Manila, was a land engagement which took place in Manila on August 13, 1898, at the end of the Spanish–American War, three months after the decisive victory by Commodore Dewey's Asiatic Squadron at the Battle of Manila Bay. The belligerents were Spanish forces led by Governor-General of the Philippines Fermín Jáudenes, and American forces led by United States Army Major General Wesley Merritt and United States Navy Commodore George Dewey. American forces were supported by units of the Philippine Revolutionary Army, led by Emilio Aguinaldo.

The battle that took place in Manila during the Philippine-Spanish War is commonly referred to as the "Mock battle of Manila". This unique and covert operation was meticulously planned by the local commanders of the Spanish and American forces, who were legally at war with each other. Their clandestine collaboration aimed to orchestrate a simulated battle that would facilitate the transfer of control over the city center from the Spanish to the Americans, all while ensuring that the Philippine Revolutionary Army would be kept at bay. The underlying motivations for this meticulously coordinated sham battle were multi-faceted, encompassing both racist and political elements. Consequently, the outcome of this strategic maneuver left the American forces in control of Intramuros, the heart of Manila, while being encircled by Philippine revolutionary forces.

This battle set the stage for the Battle of Manila in 1899, which marked the beginning of the Philippine–American War.

== Background ==
After the American victory in Manila Bay on May 1, 1898, the United States Navy, commanded by Admiral George Dewey, blockaded the city of Manila. The United States organized the Eighth Army Corps as an expeditionary force under Major General Wesley Merritt. On May 16, the vanguard of the force departed from San Francisco under Brigadier General Thomas M. Anderson. Merritt requested information on the strength of the Spanish in the Philippines, which was provided by the American consul in Hong Kong. The information revealed that the Spanish forces consisted of around 21,000 men, including 4,000 Filipinos, with the majority in Manila. However, Dewey's more accurate report showed that the Spanish forces numbered around 40,000 troops, including approximately 16,000 Filipinos, with about 15,000 situated in Manila along with nine artillery guns.

By June, Filipino forces had taken control of most of the islands, except for the walled city of Intramuros. The first contingent of American troops arrived in Cavite on June 30, the second under General Francis V. Greene on July 17, and the third under General Arthur MacArthur on July 30. By this time, some 12,000 U.S. troops had landed in the Philippines. By mid-June, some 40,000 Filipino revolutionaries under General Antonio Luna had dug fourteen miles of trenches around Manila. Filipino revolutionaries, seizing control of Manila's only pumping station, cut off the water supply to the city.

Eighth Corps had only one division, curiously numbered as the Second Division, and these revelations informed General Merritt of the relatively formidable opposition his force faced. With this knowledge, they could plan and strategize their campaign accordingly. The stage was set for an epic struggle as the United States aimed to confront and overcome the Spanish forces, securing their foothold in the Philippines and achieving victory in the Pacific.

Emilio Aguinaldo had presented surrender terms to Spanish Governor-General of the Philippines Basilio Augustín, who refused them initially, believing more Spanish troops would be sent to lift the siege. As the combined forces of Filipinos and Americans closed in, Augustín, realizing that his position was hopeless, secretly continued to negotiate with Aguinaldo, even offering ₱1 million, but the latter refused. When the Spanish parliament, the Cortes, learned of Governor-General Augustín's attempt to negotiate the surrender of the army to Filipinos under Aguinaldo, it was furious, and relieved Augustín of his duties as Governor-General, effective July 24, to be replaced by Fermin Jáudenes. On June 16, warships departed Spain to lift the siege, but they altered course for Cuba where a Spanish fleet was imperiled by the U.S. Navy. In August, life in Intramuros (the walled center of Manila), where the normal population of about ten thousand had swelled to about seventy thousand, had become unbearable. Realizing that it was only a matter of time before the city fell, and fearing vengeance and looting if the city fell to Filipino revolutionaries, Governor Jáudenes suggested to Dewey, through the Belgian consul, Édouard André, that the city be surrendered to the Americans after a short, "mock" battle. Dewey had initially rejected the suggestion because he lacked the troops to block the Filipino revolutionary forces, but when Merritt's troops became available he sent a message to Jáudenes, agreeing to the mock battle.

Merritt was eager to seize the city, but Dewey stalled while trying to work out a bloodless solution with Jáudenes. On August 4, Dewey and Merritt gave Jáudenes 48 hours to surrender, later extending the deadline by five days when it expired. Covert negotiations continued, with the details of the mock battle being arranged on August 10. The plan agreed to was that Dewey would begin a bombardment at 09:00 on August 13, shelling only Fort San Antonio Abad, a decrepit structure on the southern outskirts of Manila, and the impregnable walls of Intramuros. Simultaneously, Spanish forces would withdraw, Filipino revolutionaries would be checked, and U.S. forces would advance. Once a sufficient show of battle had been made, Dewey would hoist the signal "D.W.H.B." (meaning "Do you surrender?), whereupon the Spanish would hoist a white flag and Manila would formally surrender to U.S. forces. Under this plan, Spanish forces would be defeated by American forces, while Filipino forces would not be allowed to enter the city. This minimized the risk of unnecessary casualties on all sides, while the Spanish would also avoid the shame of possibly having to surrender Intramuros to the Filipino forces.

== Battle ==
On the evening of August 12, on orders of General Merritt, General Anderson notified Aguinaldo to forbid the insurgents under his command from entering Manila, stating "Do not let your troops enter Manila without the permission of the American commander. On this side of the Pasig River you will be under fire".

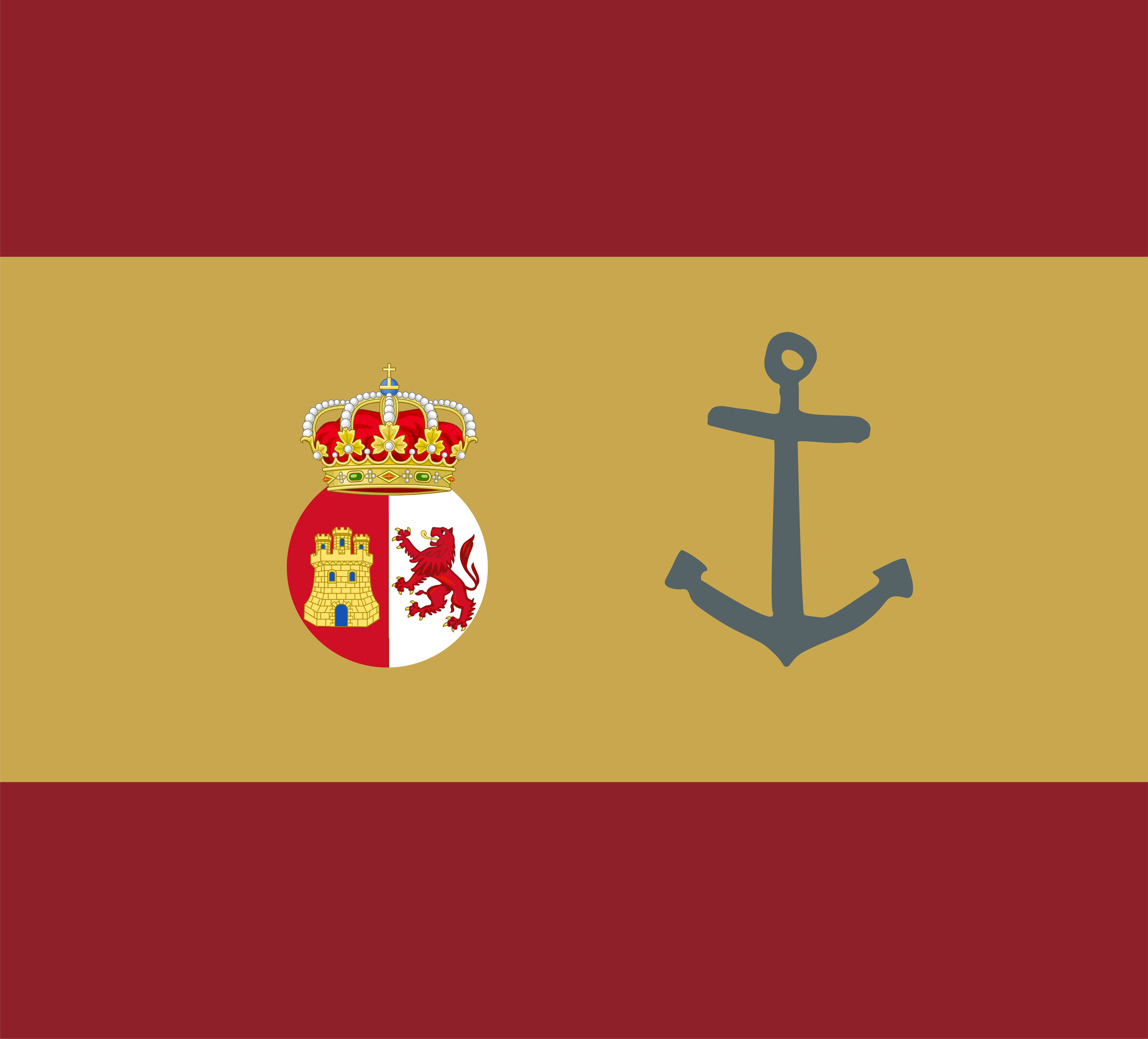
Spanish admiral’s flag captured by United States gunboat Petrel from the cruiser Isla de Luzón during the battle.

On August 13, with American commanders unaware that a peace protocol had been signed between Spain and the U.S. the previous day, Dewey began his bombardment as scheduled. Dewey directed his ship captains to spare Manila any serious damage, but gunners on one ship, unaware of the negotiated arrangements, scored several direct hits before its captain was able to cease firing and withdraw from the line.

General Greene's brigade pushed rapidly through Malate and over the bridges to occupy Binondo and San Miguel. The advancing Americans made good use of new weapons, such as the M1897 Trench Gun which was ideal for close combat. General Arthur MacArthur Jr., advancing simultaneously on the Pasay road, encountered and overcame resistance at the blockhouses, trenches, and woods to his front, advanced and held the bridges and the town of Malate. This placed Manila in American possession, except for Intramuros. Shortly after entering Malate, U.S. troops observed a white flag displayed on the walls of Intramuros. Lieutenant Colonel C. A. Whittier, United States Volunteers, representing General Merritt, and Lieutenant Brumby, U.S. Navy, representing Admiral Dewey, were sent ashore to communicate with the Captain-General. General Merritt soon personally followed, met with Governor General Jáudenes, and concluded a preliminary agreement of the terms of capitulation.

Insurgents made an independent attack of their own, as planned, which promptly led to trouble with the Americans. At 08:00 that morning, Aguinaldo received a telegram from General Anderson, sternly warning him not to let his troops enter Manila without the consent of the American commander, who was situated on the south side of the Pasig River. General Anderson's request was ignored, and Aguinaldo's forces crowded forward alongside the American forces until they directly confronted the Spanish troops. Although the Spanish were waving a flag of truce, the insurgents fired on the Spanish forces, provoking return fire.

Though a bloodless mock battle had been planned, Spanish troops had opened fire in a skirmish which left six Americans and forty-nine Spaniards dead when Filipino revolutionaries, thinking that the attack was genuine, joined advancing U.S. troops. Except for the unplanned casualties, the battle had gone according to plan; the Spanish had surrendered the city to the Americans, and it had not fallen to the Filipino revolutionaries. 19 American soldiers were killed, and 103 more were wounded in this action.

== Aftermath ==
General Anderson sent Aguinaldo a telegram, later that day, which read:

Dated Ermita Headquarters 2nd Division 13 to Gen. Aguinaldo. Commanding Filipino Forces.--Manila, taken. Serious trouble threatened between our forces. Try and prevent it. Your troops should not force themselves in the city until we have received the full surrender then we will negotiate with you. -Anderson, commanding.

Aguinaldo however demanded joint occupation of Manila. On August 13 Admiral Dewey and General Merritt informed their superiors of this and asked how far they might proceed in enforcing obedience in the matter.

General Merritt received news of the August 12 peace protocol on August 16, three days after the surrender of Manila. Admiral Dewey and General Merritt were informed by a telegram dated August 17 that the President of the United States had directed:

That there must be no joint occupation with the Insurgents. The United States in the possession of Manila city, Manila bay and harbor must preserve the peace and protect persons and property within the territory occupied by their military and naval forces. The insurgents and all others must recognize the military occupation and authority of the United States and the cessation of hostilities proclaimed by the President. Use whatever means in your judgment are necessary to this end.

Insurgent forces were looting the portions of the city which they occupied, and were not confining their attacks to Spaniards, but were assaulting their own people and raiding the property of foreigners as well. U.S. commanders pressured Aguinaldo to withdraw his forces from Manila. Negotiations proceeded slowly and, on September 8, General Elwell Otis (General Merritt being unavailable) wrote, in a long letter to Aguinaldo:

... I am compelled by my instructions to direct that your armed forces evacuate the entire city of Manila, including its suburbs and defences, and that I shall be obliged to take action with that end in view within a very short space of time should you decline to comply with my Government's demands; and I hereby serve notice on you that unless your troops are withdrawn beyond the line of the city's defences before Thursday, the 15th instant, I shall be obliged to resort to forcible action, and that my Government will hold you responsible for any unfortunate consequences which may ensue.

After further negotiation and exchanges of letters, Aguinaldo wrote on September 16: "I have given appropriate orders that my troops should abandon their most advanced positions within some of the suburbs, ...

For all practical purposes, the fall of Manila brought about the end of the Spanish–American War in the Philippines. Merritt and Dewey finally received word of the peace protocol on August 16. Captain Henry Glass of the protected cruiser USS Charleston had accepted the surrender of Guam on June 20, while en route to Manila, and Captain E.D. Taussig of the gunboat USS Bennington claimed Wake Island for the U.S. on January 17, 1899.

This battle marked the end of Filipino-American collaboration, as the American action of preventing Filipino forces from entering the captured city of Manila was deeply resented by the Filipinos. The war with Spain came to an end, but in February 1899, the Philippine–American War broke out. Tensions between the Filipino forces under Aguinaldo and the American Expeditionary forces were high. The Filipinos felt betrayed by the Americans. They had looked on the Americans as liberators aiding against Spanish occupation. On February 4, a U.S. Army private fired the first shot at a Filipino revolutionary soldier and Filipino revolutionary forces returned fire. This began the Battle of Manila of 1899. Aguinaldo sent a ranking member of his staff to Elwell Stephen Otis, the U.S. military commander, with the message that the firing had been against his orders. Otis replied, "The fighting, having begun, must go on to the grim end."

== See also ==
- Battles of the Spanish–American War
