= Military Government of the Philippine Islands =

1898–1902 U.S. military occupation of the Philippines

Military Government of the Philippine Islands Gobierno Militar de las Islas Filipinas (Spanish)
- 1898–1902
- Flag
- Motto: "E pluribus unum" (Latin) "Out of many, one"
- Anthem: "Hail, Columbia"
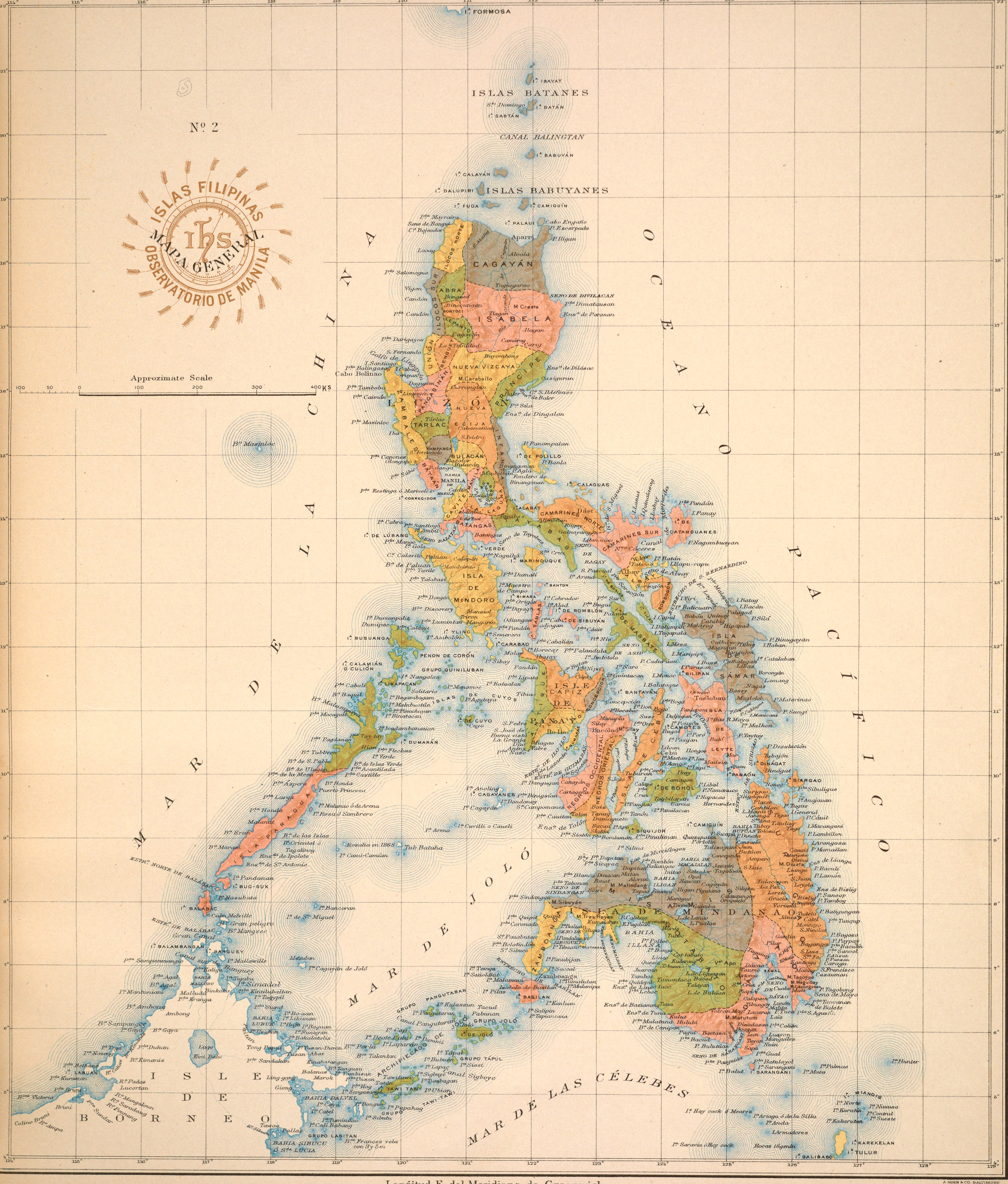
- Philippines in 1901
- Status: United States military occupation (1898–1899); Unincorporated, unorganized territory (Note: The Philippines belonged to, but were not a part of, the United States. See the page for the Insular Cases for more information.) (1899–1902)
- Capital and largest city: Manila
- Common languages: Spanish, Tagalog, English, other Languages in the Philippines
- Government: Unitary transitional government under military occupation
- President
  - 1898–1901: William McKinley
  - 1901–1902: Theodore Roosevelt
- Military Governor
  - 1898: Wesley Merritt
  - 1898–1900: Elwell S. Otis
  - 1900–1901: Arthur MacArthur, Jr.
  - 1901–1902: Adna Chaffee (jointly with Civil Governor William Howard Taft)
- Legislature: Martial law (1898–1900); Philippine Commission (1900–1902)
- History
  - Capture of Manila: August 14, 1898
  - Treaty of Paris: December 10, 1898
  - Insurrection: February 4, 1899
  - Capture of Malolos: March 31, 1899
  - Taft Commission: March 16, 1900
  - Capture of Aguinaldo: March 23, 1901
  - Surrender of Malvar: April 16, 1902
  - Organic Act enacted: July 1, 1902

Population
  - 1898: See below
- Currency: Philippine peso
Preceded by	Succeeded by
Captaincy General of the Philippines; First Philippine Republic	Insular Government of the Philippine Islands
- 1. In 1901, a civil governor was appointed, but the military retained authority in disturbed areas.; 2. An 1898 census is reported by some sources to have yielded a count of 7,832,719 inhabitants. However, the National Statistics Office of the Philippines reports that no census was conducted in that year. Another well regarded source estimates a population of seven million in 1898.

The Military Government of the Philippine Islands (Spanish: Gobierno militar de los Estados Unidos en las Islas Filipinas; Tagalog: Pamahalaang Militar ng Estados Unidos sa Kapuluang Pilipinas) was a military government in the Philippines established by the United States on August 14, 1898, a day after the capture of Manila, with General Wesley Merritt acting as military governor. General Merrit established this military government by proclamation on August 14, 1898, following surrender of the city by Fermín Jáudenes, acting General-in_chief of the Spanish Army in the Philippines.

During military rule (1898–1902), the U.S. military commander governed the Philippines under the authority of the U.S. president as Commander-in-Chief of the United States Armed Forces. After the appointment of a civil Governor-General upon the suppression of the First Philippine Republic, the procedure developed that as parts of the country were firmly put under American control, responsibility for the area would be passed to an American-installed civil government.

General Merritt was succeeded by General Elwell S. Otis as military governor, who in turn was succeeded by General Arthur MacArthur. Major General Adna Chaffee was the final military governor. The position of military governor was abolished in July 1902, after which the civilian office Governor-General became the sole executive authority in the Philippines.

The military government, initially with soldiers as teachers, reopened civil and criminal courts and established its own, including a supreme court; and local governments were established as towns and provinces were occupied. The first American-sponsored election was conducted by General Harold W. Lawton on May 7, 1899, in Baliuag, Bulacan.

== Capture of Manila ==
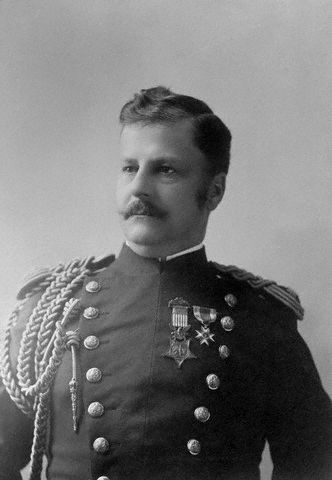
General Arthur MacArthur Jr. The last Military governor of the Philippines and the father of General Douglas MacArthur.

By June, U.S. and Filipino forces had taken control of most of the islands, except for the walled city of Intramuros. Admiral Dewey and General Merritt were able to work out a bloodless solution with acting Governor-General Fermín Jáudenes. The negotiating parties made a secret agreement to stage a mock battle in which the Spanish forces would be defeated by the American forces, but the Filipino forces would not be allowed to enter the city. This plan minimized the risk of unnecessary casualties on all sides, while the Spanish would also avoid the shame of possibly having to surrender Intramuros to the Filipino forces. On the eve of the mock battle, General Anderson telegraphed General Emilio Aguinaldo, leader of the revolutionary forces, "Do not let your troops enter Manila without the permission of the American commander. On this side of the Pasig River you will be under fire."

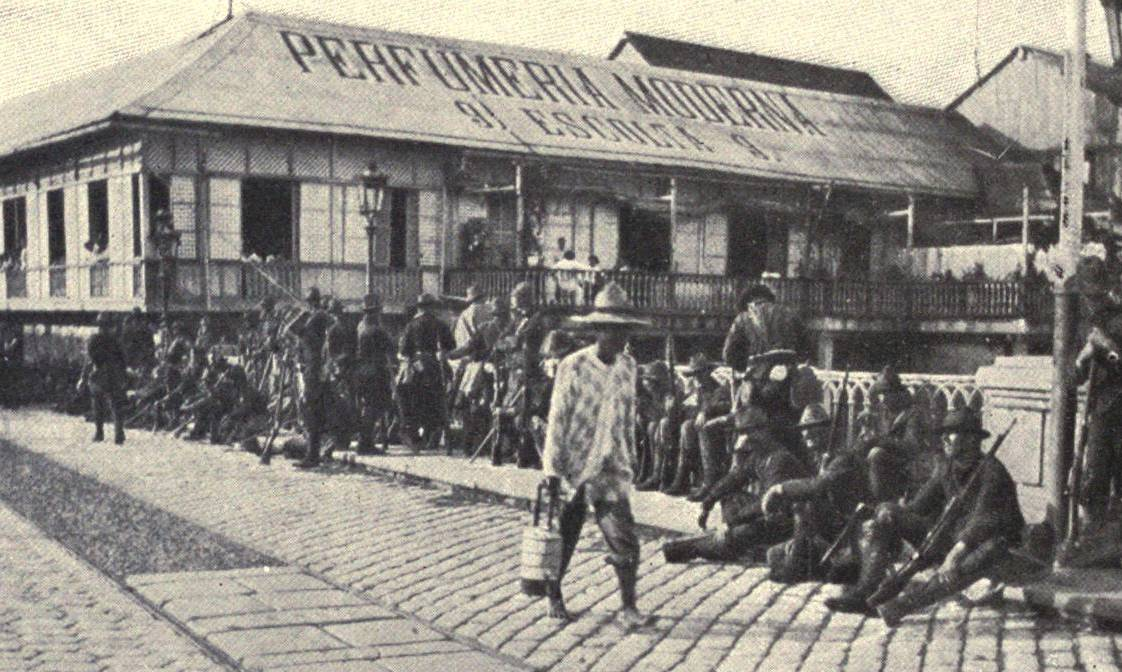
Photo of American soldiers guarding a bridge over the Pasig River after the battle, August 13, 1898

On August 13, with American commanders unaware that a ceasefire had already been signed between Spain and the U.S. on the previous day, American forces captured the city of Manila from the Spanish in the Battle of Manila. The battle started when Dewey's ships bombarded Fort San Antonio Abad, a decrepit structure on the southern outskirts of Manila, and the virtually impregnable walls of Intramuros. In accordance with the plan, the Spanish forces withdrew while U.S. forces advanced. Once a sufficient show of battle had been made, Dewey hoisted the signal "D.W.H.B." (meaning "Do you surrender?), whereupon the Spanish hoisted a white flag and Manila was formally surrendered to U.S. forces.

This battle marked the end of Filipino-American collaboration, as the American action of preventing Filipino forces from entering the captured city of Manila was deeply resented by the Filipinos. Despite the loss of Manila to the Americans, the Filipinos continued liberating the archipelago, freeing most of the provinces by the end of 1898. Tensions simmered between the Filipino and American powers, and the United States provoked the Philippine–American War (1899–1902), which would prove to be more deadly and costly than the preceding Spanish–American War.

== Spanish–American War ends ==
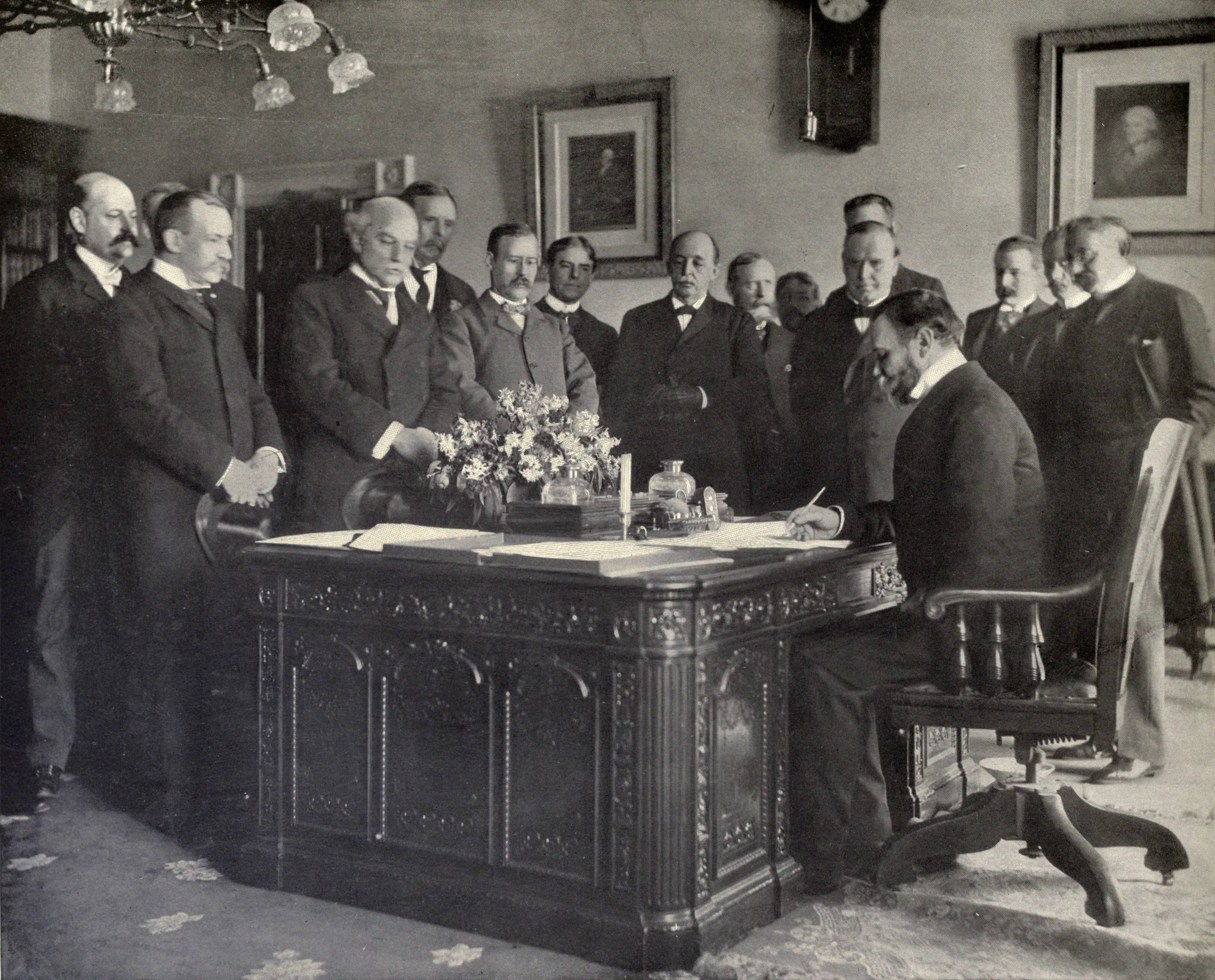
John Hay, Secretary of State, signing the memorandum of ratification on behalf of the United States

Article V of the peace protocol signed on August 12 had mandated negotiations to conclude a treaty of peace to begin in Paris not later than October 1, 1898. President McKinley sent a five-man commission, initially instructed to demand no more than Luzon, Guam, and Puerto Rico; which would have provided a limited U.S. empire of pinpoint colonies to support a global fleet and provide communication links. In Paris, the commission was besieged with advice, particularly from American generals and European diplomats, to demand the entire Philippine archipelago. The unanimous recommendation was that "it would certainly be cheaper and more humane to take the entire Philippines than to keep only part of it." On October 28, 1898, McKinley wired the commission that "cessation of Luzon alone, leaving the rest of the islands subject to Spanish rule, or to be the subject of future contention, cannot be justified on political, commercial, or humanitarian grounds. The cessation must be the whole archipelago or none. The latter is wholly inadmissible, and the former must therefore be required." The Spanish negotiators were furious over the "immodest demands of a conqueror", but their wounded pride was assuaged by an offer of twenty million dollars for "Spanish improvements" to the islands. The Revolutionary Government of the Philippines, which governed revolutionary-held provinces in the country, sent Felipe Agoncillo to represent the inhabitants of both the liberated and yet-to-be liberated areas of the country, but he was refused participation in the deliberations. The Spaniards capitulated and on December 10, 1898, the U.S. and Spain signed the Treaty of Paris, formally ending the Spanish–American War. In Article III, Spain ceded its control over the Philippine archipelago to the United States, with the following terms: "Spain cedes to the United States the archipelago known as the Philippine Islands, and comprehending the islands lying within the following line: [... geographic description elided ...]. The United States will pay to Spain the sum of twenty million dollars ($20,000,000) within three months after the exchange of the ratifications of the present treaty."

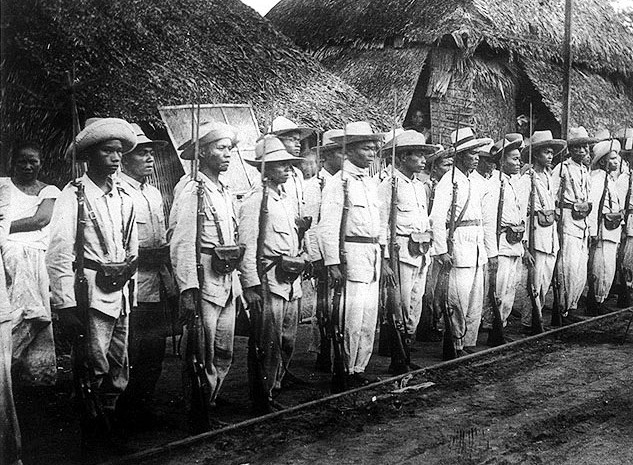
"Insurgent (Filipino) soldiers in the Philippines, 1899"(original caption)

In the U.S., there was a movement for Philippine independence; some said that the U.S. had no right to a land where many of the people wanted self-government. In 1898 Andrew Carnegie, an industrialist and steel magnate, offered to buy the Philippines for $20 million and give it to the Filipinos so that they could be free of United States government.

On November 7, 1900, Spain and the U.S. signed the Treaty of Washington, clarifying that the territories relinquished by Spain to the United States included any and all islands belonging to the Philippine Archipelago, but lying outside the lines described in the Treaty of Paris. That treaty explicitly named the islands of Cagayan Sulu and Sibutu and their dependencies as among the relinquished territories.

== Philippine–American War (1899–1902) ==
=== Escalation of tensions ===
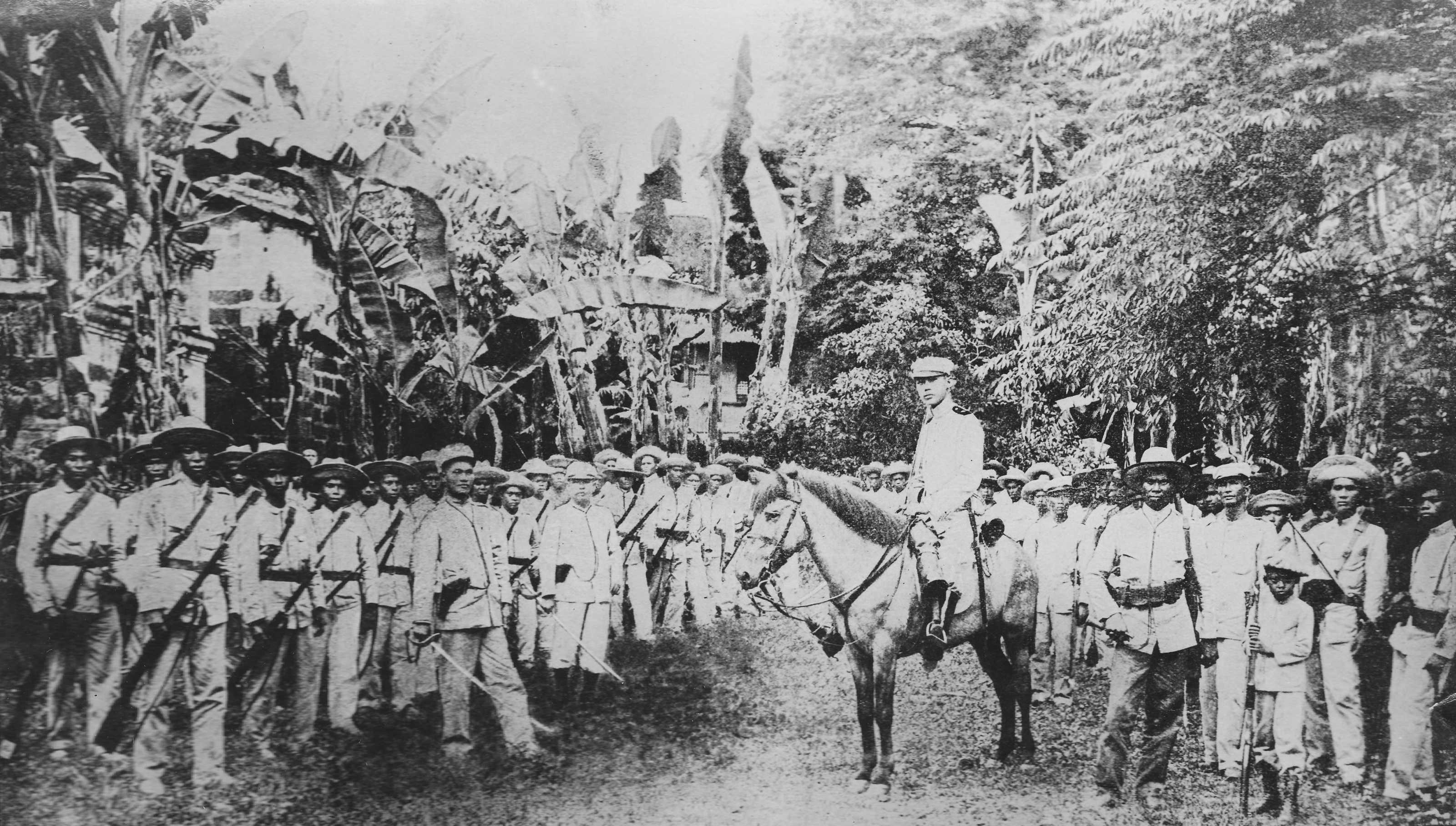
Gregorio del Pilar and his troops, around 1898.

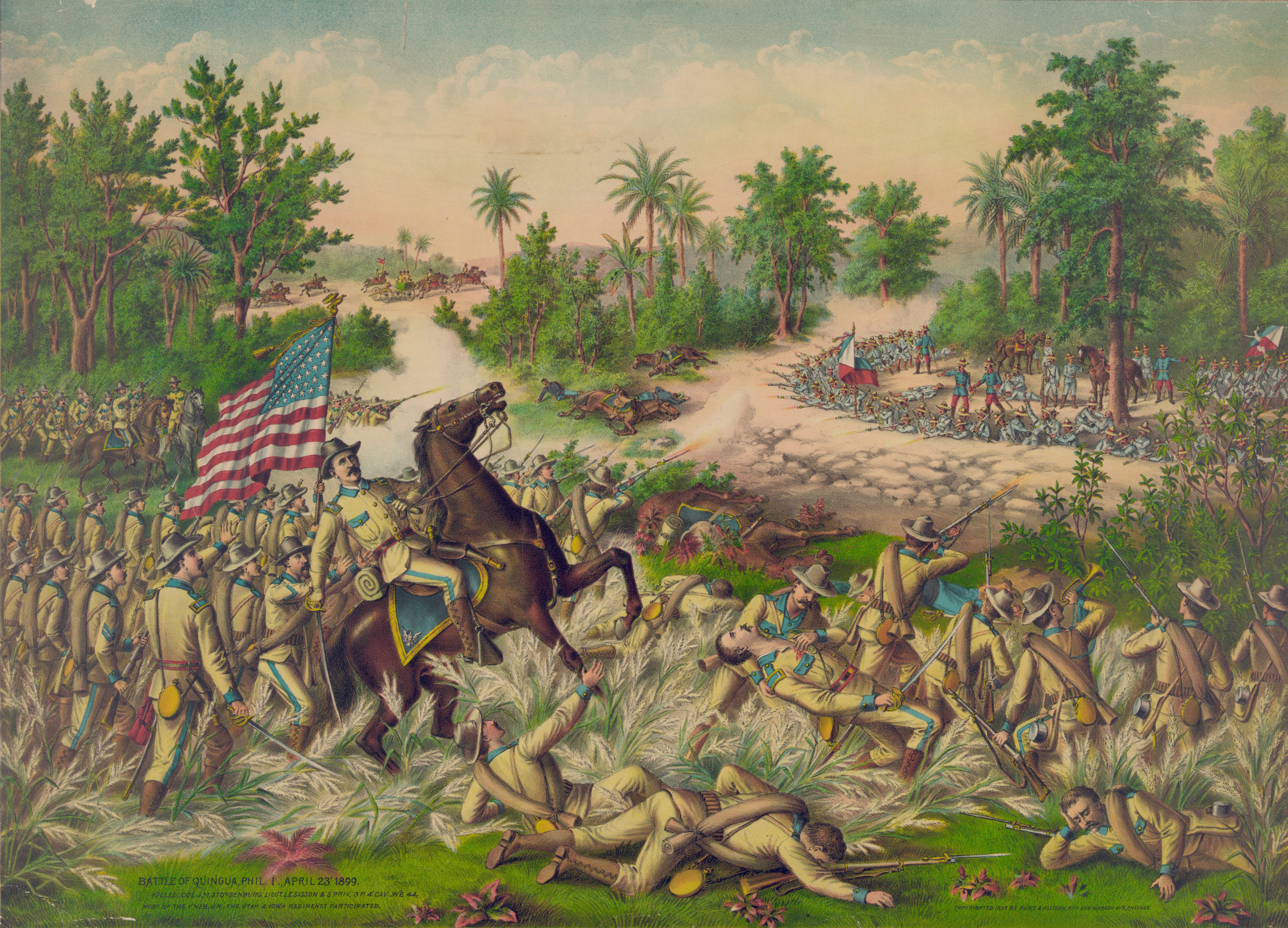
Battle of Quingua, April 23, 1899 Philippine–American War

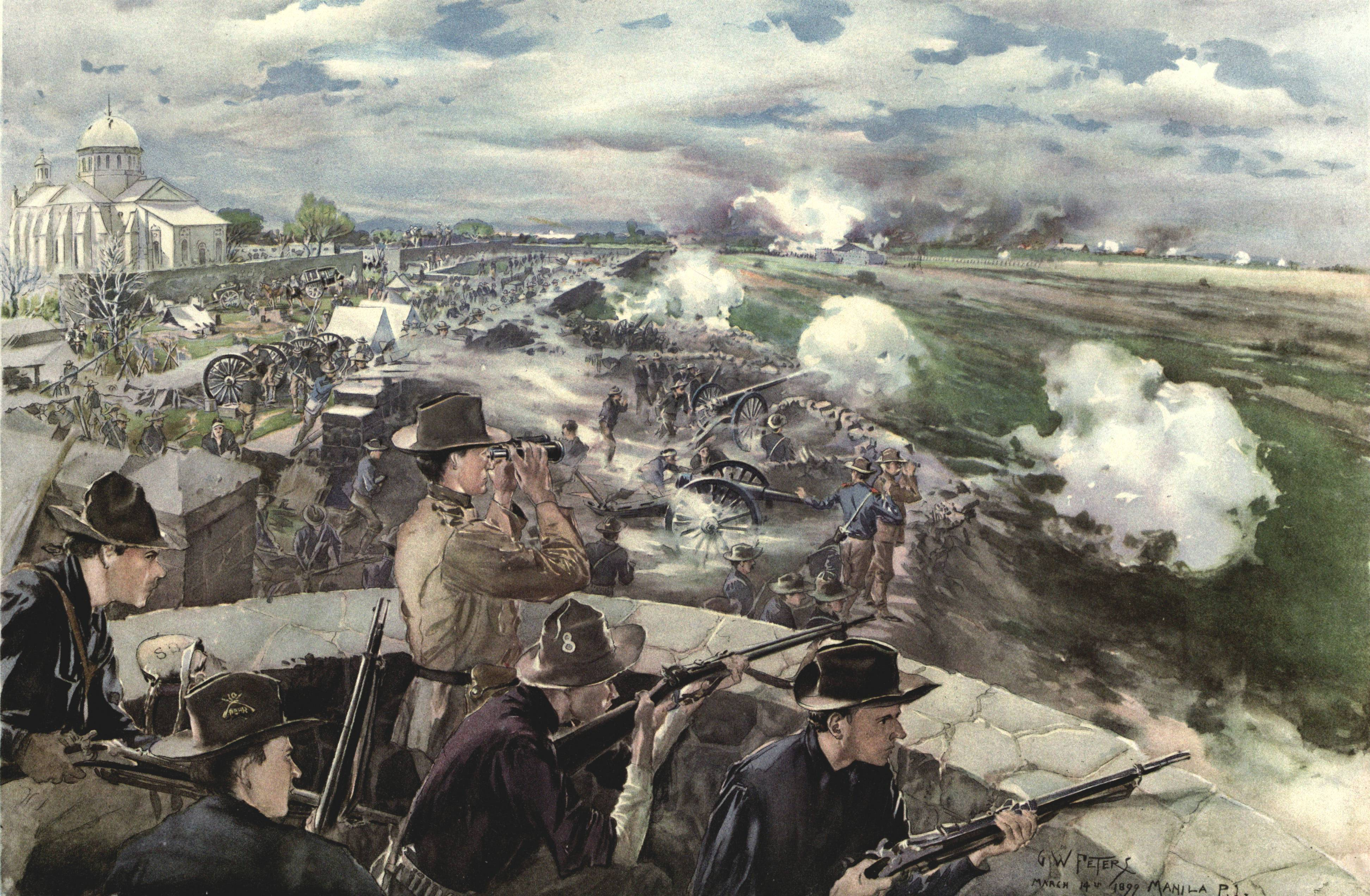
Battle before Caloocan

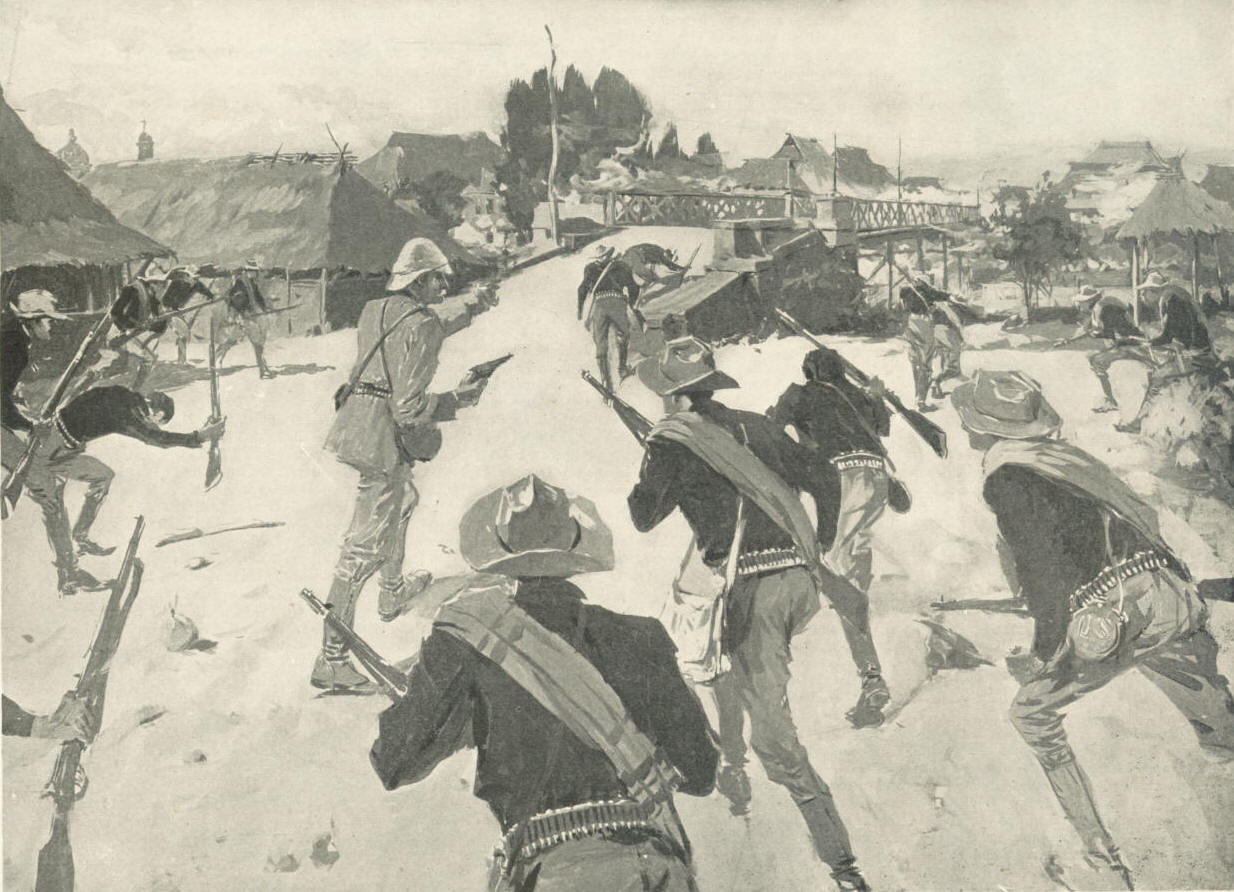
Battle of Santa Cruz

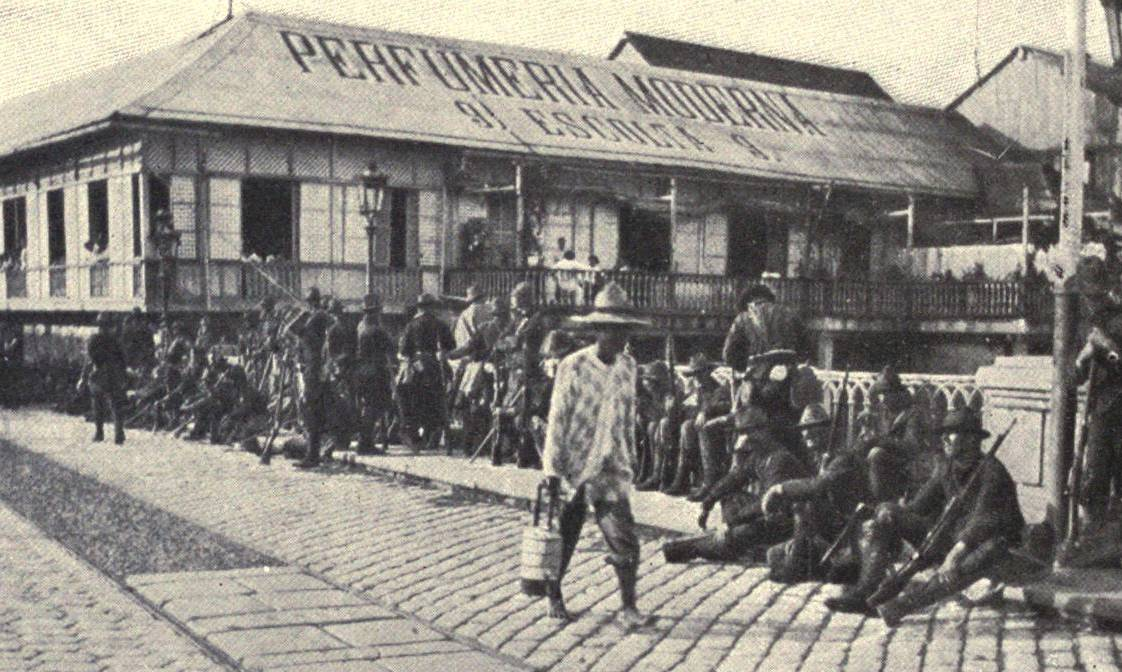
American troops guarding the bridge over the River Pasig

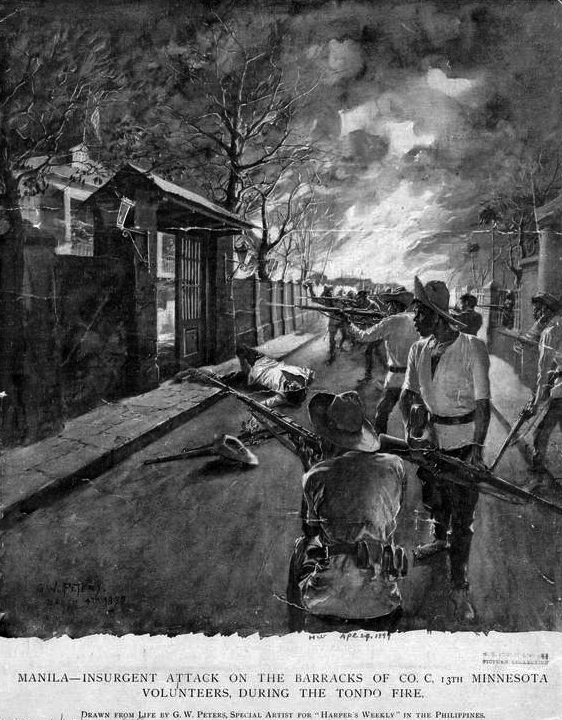
Attack on the barracks of Company C of the 13th Minnesota Volunteers by Filipino forces during the Tondo Fire in Manila, 1899

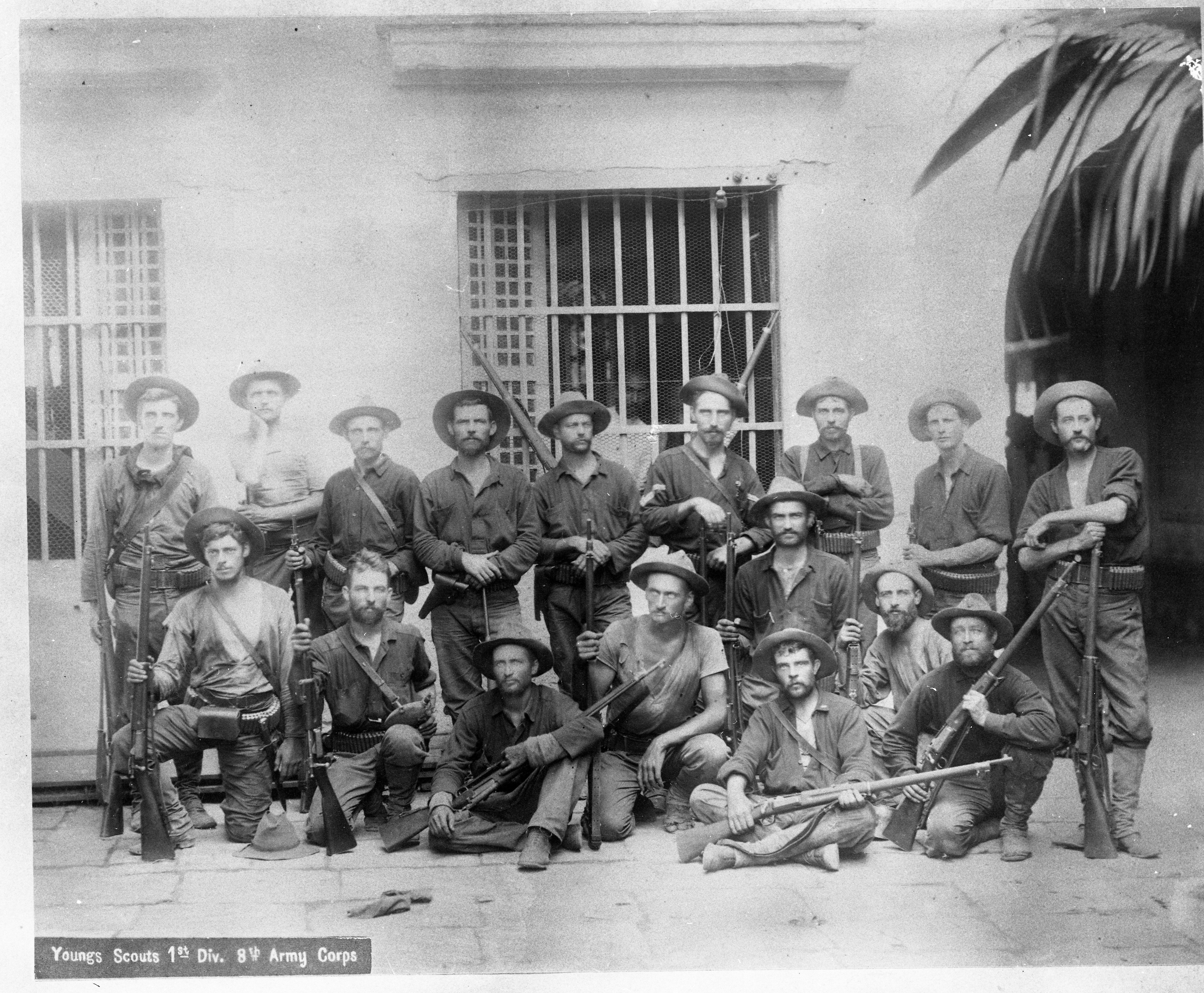
Young's Scouts, including Marcus W. Robertson(2nd from right, front row squatting), Richard Moses Longfellow (4th from right, front row squatting), Medal of Honor recipients. Picture taken in Philippines.

The Spanish had yielded Iloilo to the Filipinos in 1898 to trouble the Americans. On January 1, 1899, news had come to Washington, D.C., from Manila that American forces, which had been sent to Iloilo under the command of General Marcus Miller, had been confronted by 6,000 armed Filipinos, who refused them permission to land. President Lopez of the Federal Government of the Visayas" informed General Miller that "foreign troops" would not land "without express orders from the central government of Luzon." Previously, on December 21, 1898, McKinley issued a proclamation of intent to occupy the Philippines. General Otis delayed its publication until January 4, 1899, and published a version that had been edited to avoid conveying the meanings of the terms "sovereignty," "protection," and "right of cessation," which occurred in the unedited version. Unknown to Otis, the US Department of War had also sent an enciphered copy of the proclamation to General Miller in Iloilo for informational purposes. Miller assumed that it was for distribution and, unaware that a politically-expired version, published in both Spanish and Tagalog translations, eventually made their way to Aguinaldo, president of the Revolutionary Government. Even before Aguinaldo received the unaltered version and observed the changes in the copy that he had received from Otis, Aguinaldo was already upset that Otis was referred to as "Military Governor of the Philippines" in the unaltered version, which he had received from Otis (the unaltered version said "in the Philippines."). Aguinaldo did not miss the significance of the alteration, which Otis had made without authorization from Washington.

On January 5, Aguinaldo issued a counterproclamation that summarized what he saw as American violations of the ethics of friendship, particularly regarding the events in Iloilo. The proclamation concluded, "Such procedures, so foreign to the dictates of culture and the usages observed by civilized nations, gave me the right to act without observing the usual rules of intercourse. Nevertheless, in order to be correct to the end, I sent to General Otis commissioners charged to solicit him to desist from his rash enterprise, but they were not listened to. My government can not remain indifferent in view of such a violent and aggressive seizure of a portion of its territory by a nation which arrogated to itself the title champion of oppressed nations. Thus it is that my government is disposed to open hostilities if the American troops attempt to take forcible possession of the Visayan Islands. I denounce these acts before the world, in order that the conscience of mankind may pronounce its infallable verdict as to who are the true oppressors of nations and the tormentors of human kind."

After some copies of that proclamation had been distributed, Aguinaldo ordered the recall of undistributed copies and issued another proclamation, which was published the same day in El Heraldo de la Revolucion, the official newspaper of the Philippine government: "As in General Otis's proclamation he alluded to some instructions edited by His Excellency the President of the United States, referring to the administration of the matters in the Philippine Islands, I in the name of God, the root and fountain of all justice, and that of all the right which has been visibly granted to me to direct my dear brothers in the difficult work of our regeneration, protest most solemnly against this intrusion of the United States Government on the sovereignty of these islands.

I equally protest in the name of the Filipino people against the said intrusion, because as they have granted their vote of confidence appointing me president of the nation, although I don't consider that I deserve such, therefore I consider it my duty to defend to death its liberty and independence."

Otis, taking both proclamations as a call to arms, strengthened American observation posts and alerted his troops. In the tense atmosphere, some 40,000 Filipinos fled Manila within a period of 15 days.

Meanwhile, Felipe Agoncillo, who had been commissioned by the Philippine Revolutionary Government as Minister Plenipotentiary to negotiate treaties with foreign governments and was refused a seat at the negotiations between the US and Spain in Paris, was now in Washington. On January 6, he filed a request for an interview with the President to discuss affairs in the Philippines. The next day, the government officials were surprised to learn that messages to Otis to deal mildly with the Filipinos and not to force a conflict had become known to Agoncillo and had been cabled by him to Aguinaldo. At the same time, Aguinaldo's protest against General Otis signing himself "Military Governor of the Philippines" arrived. On January 8, Agoncillo stated, "In my opinion the Filipino people, whom I represent, will never consent to become a colony dependency of the United States. The soldiers of the Filipino army have pledged their lives that they will not lay down their arms until General Aguinaldo tells them to do so, and they will keep that pledge, I feel confident."

The Filipino committees in London, Paris, and Madrid around that time telegraphed to President McKinley: "We protest against the disembarkation of American troops at Iloilo. The treaty of peace still unratified, the American claim to sovereignty is premature. Pray reconsider the resolution regarding Iloilo. Filipinos wish for the friendship of America and abhor militarism and deceit."

On January 8, Aguinaldo received the following message from Teodoro Sandiko to the President of the Revolutionary Government, Malolos, from Sandico, Manila. January 8, 1899, 9.40 p.m., "In consequence of the order of General Rios to his officers, as soon as the Filipino attack begins the Americans should be driven into the Intramuros district and the walled city should be set on fire. Pipi."

The New York Times reported on January 8 that two Americans who had been guarding a waterboat in Iloilo had been attacked, one fatally, and that Filipinos were threatening to destroy the business section of the city by fire and that on January 10, a peaceful solution to the Iloilo issues may result but that Aguinaldo had issued a proclamation threatening to drive the Americans from the islands.

By January 10, the Filipinos were ready for conflict but would not act unless the Americans fired the first shot. The pensive attitude toward the Americans caused them to push their lines further. Their attitude was well illustrated by this extract from a telegram sent by Colonel Cailles to Aguinaldo on January 10, 1899: "Most urgent. An American interpreter has come to tell me to withdraw our forces in Maytubig fifty paces. I shall not draw back a step, and in place of withdrawing, I shall advance a little farther. He brings a letter from his general, in which he speaks to me as a friend. I said that from the day I knew that Maquinley (McKinley) opposed our independence I did not want any dealings with any American. War, war, is what we want. The Americans after this speech went off pale."

The pensiveness had reached the presidency of the revolutionary government, as demonstrated by Aguinaldo's handwritten reply to Cailles: "I approve and applaud what you have done with the Americans, and zeal and valour always, also my beloved officers and soldiers there. I believe that they are playing us until the arrival of their reinforcements, but I shall send an ultimatum and remain always on the alert.--E. A. Jan. 10, 1899."

The Revolutionary Government was replaced by a provisional democratic republic on January 23, 1899, in the face of simmering tensions.

On January 31, 1899, the Minister of Interior of the Philippine Republic, Teodoro Sandiko, signed a decree stating that President Aguinaldo had directed that all idle lands be planted to provide food for the people in view of impending war with the Americans.

=== Outbreak of general hostilities ===
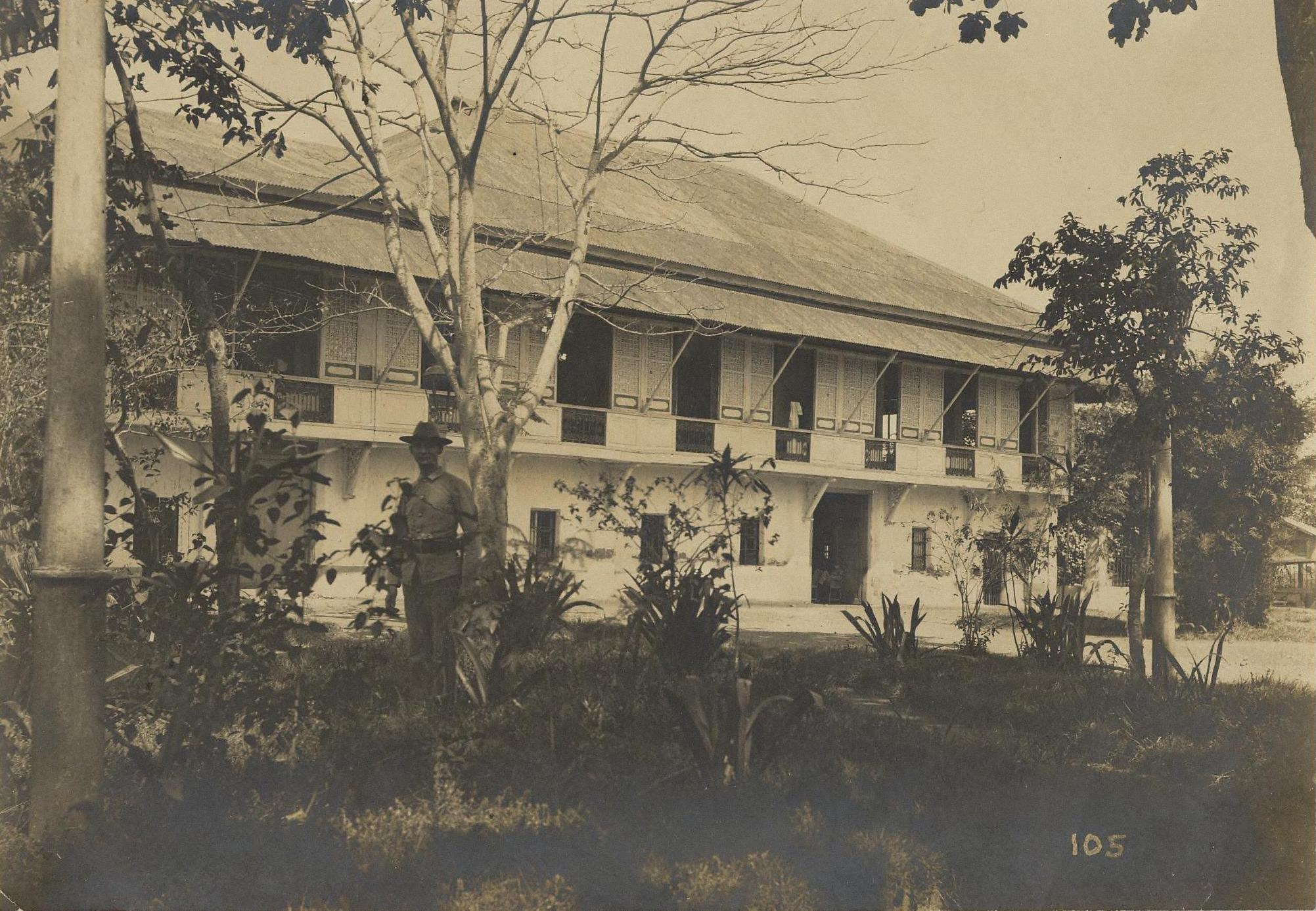
Emilio Aguinaldo's quarters in Manila following his capture by the Americans.

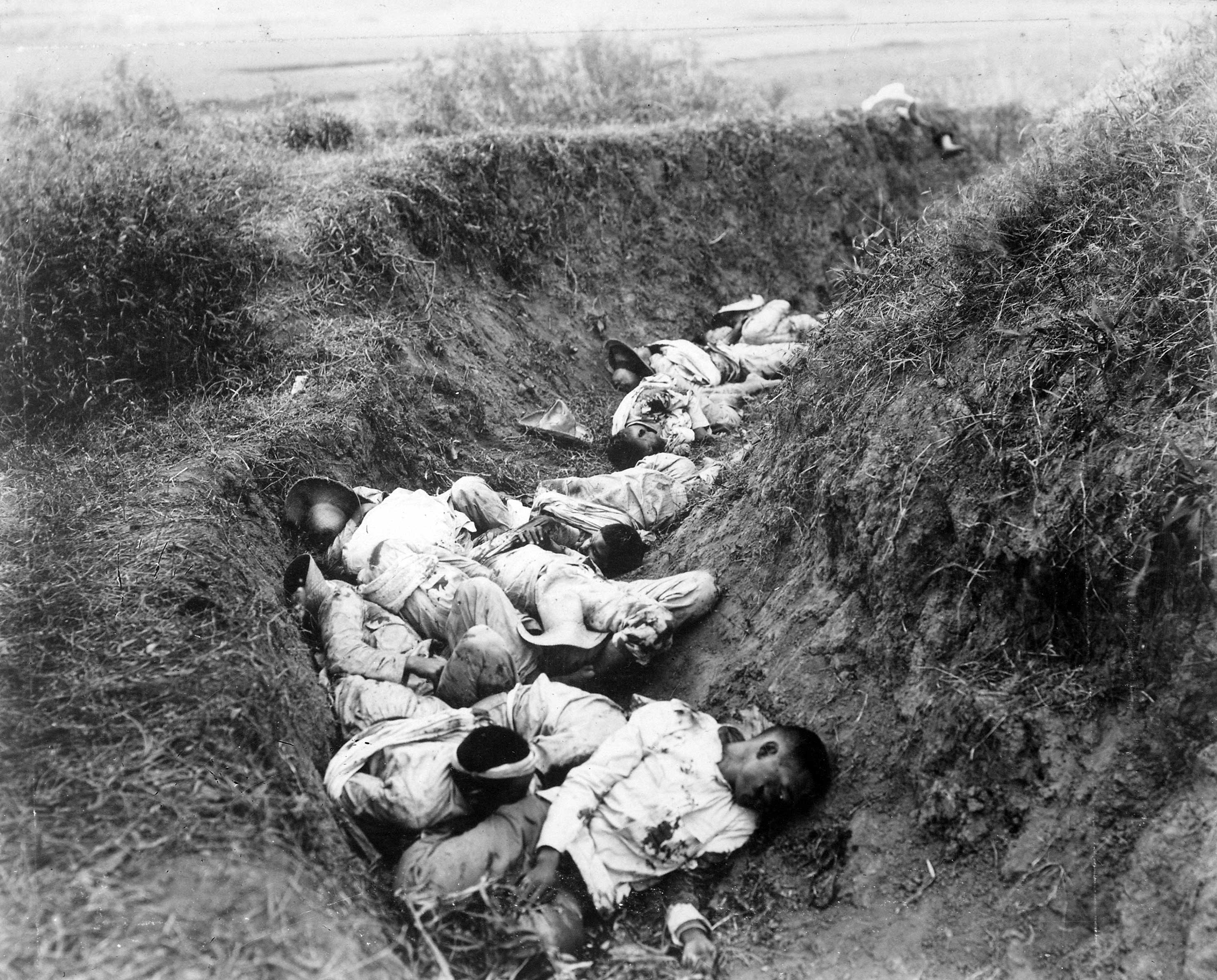
Filipino casualties

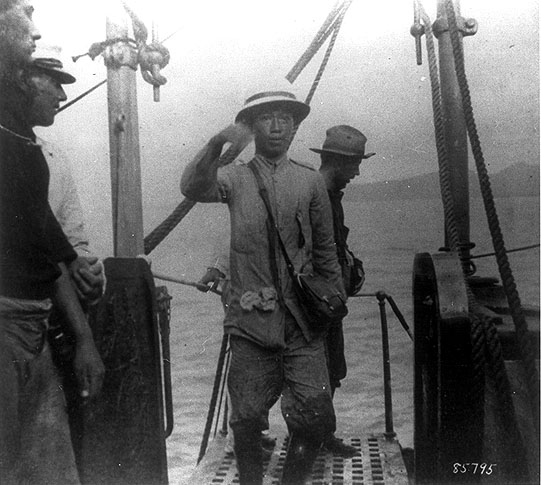
Surrendered President Aguinaldo boards the USS Vicksburg, 1900.

Hostilities between the Filipinos and Americans broke out on February 4, 1899, at the provocation of Private William Grayson, who gave the following account:

"At 8 o'clock on the morning of February 4" . . . "I went on duty at outpost 2, which was about 100 yards from block house 7, at that time In the possession of the Filipinos and a half a mile from our headquarters in Santa Ana. Half an hour later our lieutenant and sergeant of the guard were reconnoitering along our line when several Filipinos, with a lieutenant, followed and called for a halt. They approached and began proclaiming that that was their territory. Our officers pretended not to understand their lingo and soon went on their way. I was relieved at 10 o'clock and rested until 2 o'clock, but no demonstration had been made In the meantime. All day the Filipinos were occasionally calling out vile names addressed to us Americans. They would vary this with Spanish to the effect that 'One Filipino Is equal to five Americans,' and 'Tonight we'll drive the Americans In a long way.' One of them had earlier called Stotsenberg the worst kind of a name, and it was only to avoid a conflict that the colonel did not yield to the temptation to clear every Insurgent from our front. They had no business on that side of the river anyway.

"That night, about 8 o'clock, Miller and I there were two of us were cautiously pacing our district. We came to a fence and were trying to see what the Filipinos were up to. Suddenly, near at hand on our left, there was a low but unmistakable Filipino outpost signal whistle. It was immediately answered toy a similar whistle about twenty-five yards to the right. Then the red lantern flashed its signal from blockhouse 7. We had never seen such a sign used before. In a moment something rose slowly up, not twenty feet in front of us. It was a Filipino. They were evidently moving dangerously near.

"I yelled 'Halt!' and I made it pretty loud, for I was accustomed to challenging the officer of the guard in approved military style. The man moved. I challenged him with another loud 'Halt !' Then he impudently shouted 'Halto' at me. Well, I thought the best thing to do was to shoot him. He dropped. If I didn't kill him, I guess he died of fright. Then two Filipinos sprang out of the gateway about fifteen feet from us. I called 'Halt ! ' and Miller fired and dropped one. I saw that another was left. Well, I think I got my second Filipino that time . . . We then retreated to the pipe line and got behind the water main and stayed there all night. It was some minutes after our second shots before the Filipinos began firing, but then they made up for it by a fusillade that showed they had been prepared for their boasted advance."

— Grayson's Story of His First Shot. Omaha Daily Bee, August 6, 1899.

=== War ===
On February 4, Aguinaldo declared, "That peace and friendly relations with the Americans be broken and that the latter be treated as enemies, within the limits prescribed by the laws of war." On June 2, 1899, the National Assembly enacted and ratified a declaration of war on the United States, which was publicly proclaimed on that same day by Pedro A. Paterno, the President of the Assembly.

Unlike in the preceding war with Spain, the Filipinos did not do well in the field. Aguinaldo and his government fled Malolos before its capture on March 31, 1899, and they were driven into northern Luzon. Peace feelers from members of Aguinaldo's cabinet failed in May when the American commander, General Ewell Otis, demanded an unconditional surrender. In 1901, Aguinaldo was captured and swore allegiance to the United States, dissolving the Philippine Republic, but not preventing its holdouts from further engaging the United States.

=== First Philippine Commission ===
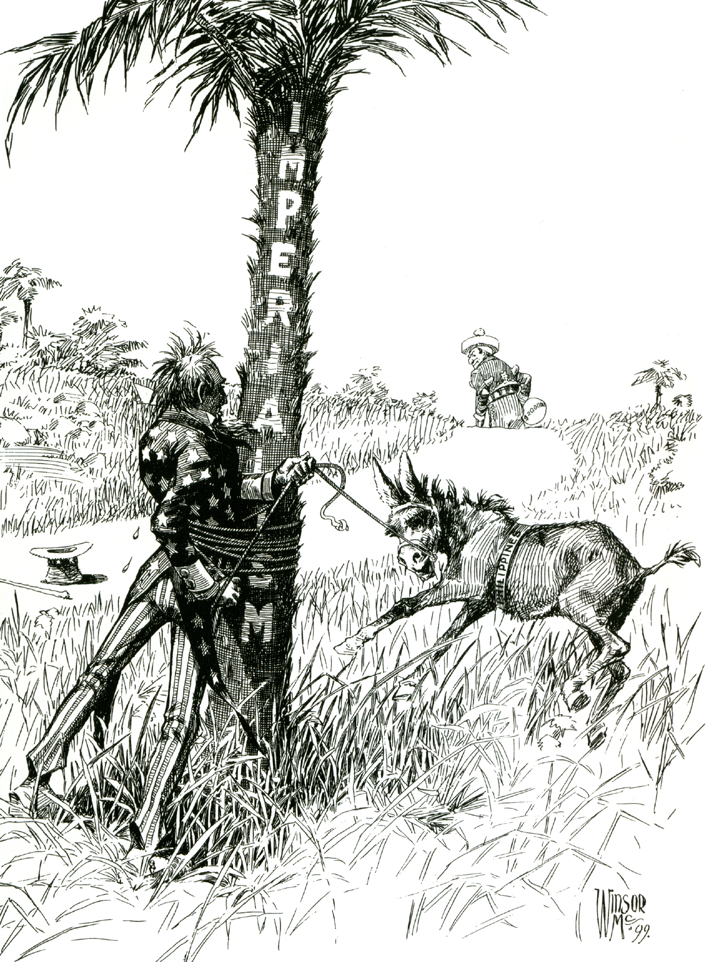
1899 political cartoon by Winsor McCay. Uncle Sam (representing the United States), gets entangled with rope around a tree, labeled "Imperialism," while he tries to subdue a bucking colt or mule, labeled "Philippines," and a figure, representing Spain, walks off over the horizon and carr ies a bag, labeled "$20,000,000."

McKinley had appointed a five-person group, headed by Dr. Jacob Gould Schurman, president of Cornell University, on January 20, 1899, to investigate conditions in the islands and to make recommendations. The three civilian members of the Philippine Commission arrived in Manila on March 4, 1899, a month after the Battle of Manila. The commission published a proclamation containing assurances that the US was "anxious to establish in the Philippine Islands an enlightened system of government under which the Philippine people may enjoy the largest measure of home rule and the amplest liberty."

After meetings in April with Philippine representatives, the commission requested authorization from McKinley to offer a specific plan. He authorized an offer of a government, consisting of "a Governor-General appointed by the President; cabinet appointed by the Governor-General; [and] a general advisory council elected by the people." In the final report, which they issued to the president the next year, the commissioners acknowledged Filipino aspirations for independence but claimed that the Philippines was not ready for it, unilaterally declaring that "The Filipinos are wholly unprepared for independence... there being no Philippine nation, but only a collection of different peoples."

On November 2, 1899, the commission issued a preliminary report that said:

Should our power by any fatality be withdrawn, the commission believe that the government of the Philippines would speedily lapse into anarchy, which would excuse, if it did not necessitate, the intervention of other powers and the eventual division of the islands among them. Only through American occupation, therefore, is the idea of a free, self-governing, and united Philippine commonwealth at all conceivable. And the indispensable need from the Filipino point of view of maintaining American sovereignty over the archipelago is recognized by all intelligent Filipinos and even by those insurgents who desire an American protectorate. The latter, it is true, would take the revenues and leave us the responsibilities. Nevertheless, they recognize the indubitable fact that the Filipinos cannot stand alone. Thus the welfare of the Filipinos coincides with the dictates of national honour in forbidding our abandonment of the archipelago. We cannot from any point of view escape the responsibilities of government which our sovereignty entails; and the commission is strongly persuaded that the performance of our national duty will prove the greatest blessing to the peoples of the Philippine Islands."

— Report Philippine Commission, Vol. I, November 3, 1899. p. 183.

Specific recommendations included the establishment of civilian government as rapidly as possible (the American chief executive in the islands was then the military governor), including establishment of a bicameral legislature, autonomous governments on the provincial and municipal levels, and a system of free public elementary schools, all of which had already been established under the auspices of the Philippine Republic.

=== Second Philippine Commission ===
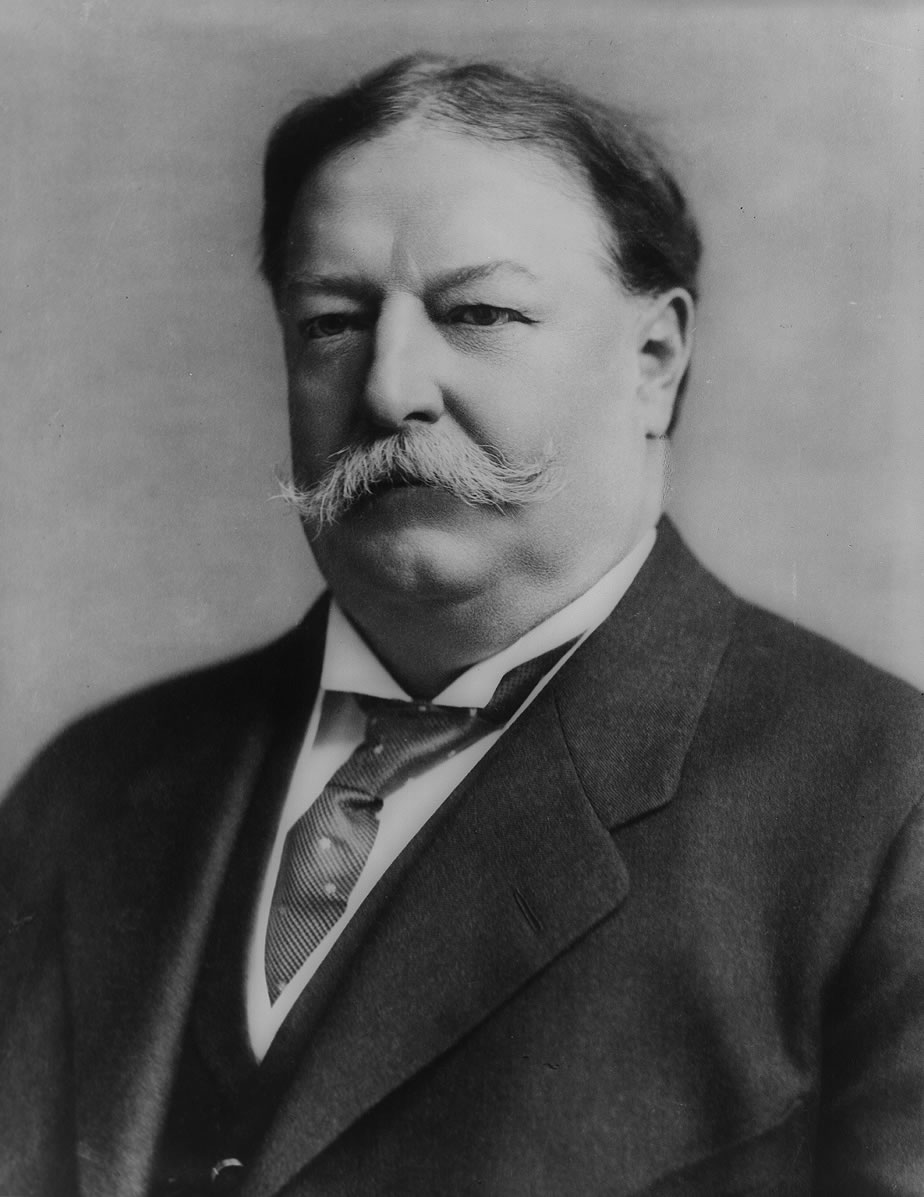
William Howard Taft, governor general of the Philippines

The Second Philippine Commission (the Taft Commission), appointed by McKinley on March 16, 1900, and headed by William Howard Taft, was granted legislative and limited executive powers. On September 1, the Taft Commission began to exercise legislative functions. Between September 1900 and August 1902, it issued 499 laws; established a judicial system, including a supreme court; drew up a legal code; and organized a civil service. The 1901 municipal code provided for popularly elected presidents, vice presidents, and councilors to serve on municipal boards. Members of the municipal boards were responsible for collecting taxes, maintaining municipal properties, undertaking necessary construction projects, and electing provincial governors.

=== Establishment of civil government ===
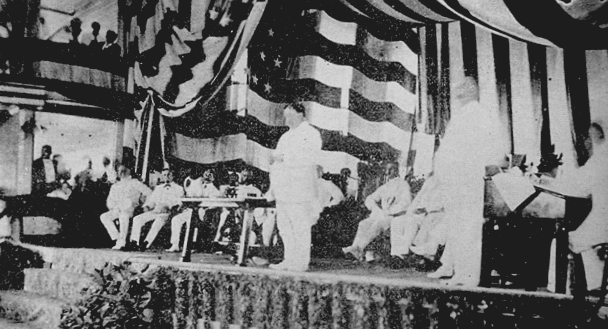
Governor General William Howard Taft addressing the audience at the Philippine Assembly in the Manila Grand Opera House

On March 3, 1901, the U.S. Congress passed the Army Appropriation Act containing (along with the Platt Amendment on Cuba) the Spooner Amendment, which provided the President with the legislative authority to establish an American civil government in the Philippines. Until then, the President had been administering the Philippines by virtue of his war powers. On July 1, 1901, civil government was inaugurated, with Taft as the Civil Governor. On February 3, 1903, the US Congress changed the title of Civil Governor to Governor-General.

A highly-centralized public school system was installed in 1901, using English as the medium of instruction. Since that created a heavy shortage of teachers, the Philippine Commission authorized the Secretary of Public Instruction to bring to the Philippines 600 teachers from the U.S., the so-called Thomasites. Free primary instruction to train the people for the duties of citizenship and avocation was enforced by the Taft Commission, according to instructions by McKinley. Also, the Catholic Church was disestablished, and a considerable amount of church land was purchased and redistributed.

=== Official end to war ===
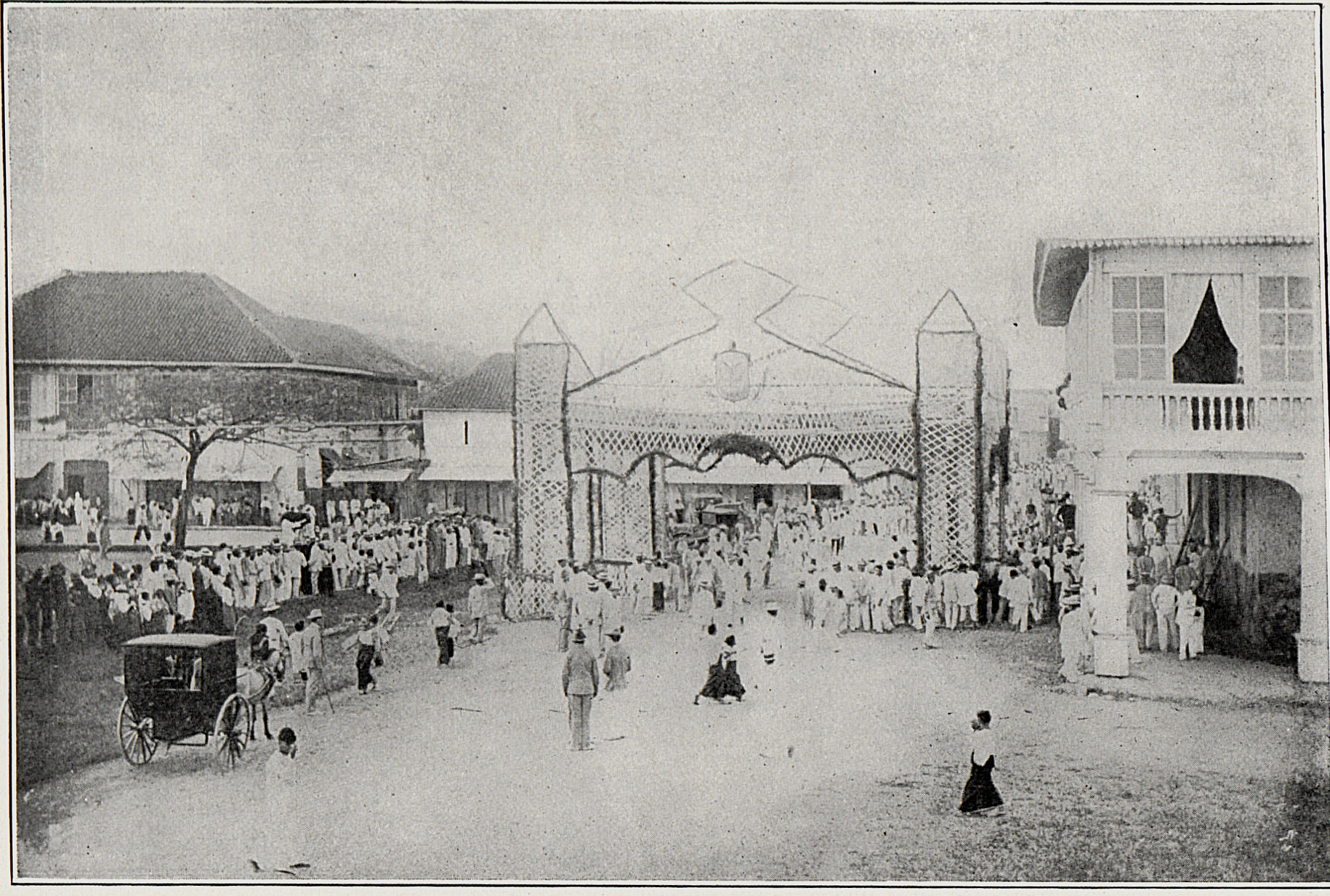
The town of Jaro in the subdued Philippines prepared for the immediate arrival of Governor-General Taft.

The Philippine Organic Act of July 1902 approved, ratified, and confirmed McKinley's executive order establishing the Philippine Commission and stipulated that a bicameral Philippine Legislature would be established, composed of an elected lower house, the Philippine Assembly, and an appointed upper house, the Philippine Commission. The act also provided for extending the United States Bill of Rights to the Philippines.

On July 2, 1902, the Secretary of War telegraphed that the war had come to an end, with American provincial civil governments established, and so the office of Military Governor was terminated. On July 4, Theodore Roosevelt, who had succeeded to the presidency after the assassination of McKinley on September 5, 1901, proclaimed a full and complete pardon and amnesty to all persons in the Philippines who had participated in the conflict. On April 9, 2002, Philippine president Gloria Macapagal Arroyo would proclaim a new ending date, April 16, 1902, for the Philippine–American War. The date saw the surrender of General Miguel Malvar, and she declared the centennial anniversary of that date as a national working holiday and as a special non-working holiday in the Province of Batangas and in the Cities of Batangas, Lipa and Tanaun.

=== Later hostilities ===
The war unofficially continued for nearly a decade since bands of guerrillas, quasi-religious armed groups, and other resistance groups continued to roam the countryside and to clash with U.S. Army or Philippine Constabulary patrols. The U.S. Army and the Philippine Constabulary continued hostilities against those resistance groups until 1913. Some historians consider these unofficial extensions to be part of the war.

== Comparisons with the First Philippine Republic ==
	United States Military Government	Philippine Republic
Established	August 14, 1898	January 23, 1899
Constitutional Document	War powers authority of the President	Malolos Constitution
Capital	Manila	Malolos, Bulacan
Head of State	President of the United States: William McKinley (1898–1901); Theodore Roosevelt (1901–1902)	President of the Philippines: Emilio Aguinaldo (1898–1901); Miguel Malvar (1901–1902) (unofficial)
Head of Government	Military Governor of the Philippine Islands: Wesley Merritt (1898); Elwell S. Otis (1898–1900); Arthur MacArthur, Jr. (1900–1901); Adna Chaffee (1901–1902)	President of the Philippines: Emilio Aguinaldo (1898–1901); Miguel Malvar (1901–1902) (unofficial)
Legislative	Martial Law (1898–1900); Philippine Commission (1900–1902)	National Assembly
Military	United States Armed Forces	Philippine Republican Army
Currency	Peso	Peso
Official Language(s)	English	Spanish, Philippine languages

== See also ==
- History of the Philippines (1898–1946)
- First Philippine Republic
- Second Philippine Republic
- Insular Government of the Philippine Islands
- Commonwealth of the Philippines
