= Francisco Rizzo =

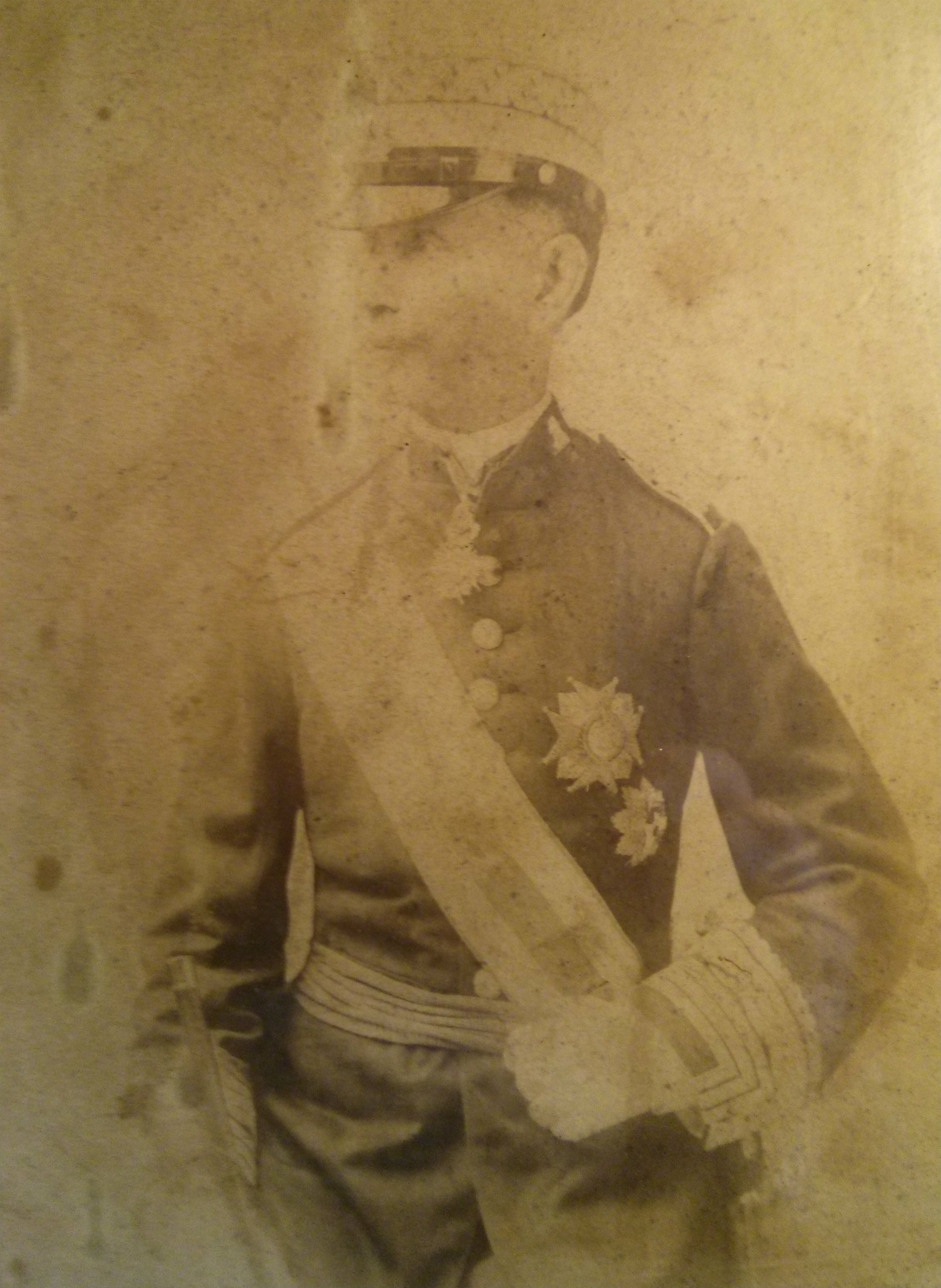

115th Governor-General of the Philippines
- In office August 13 – September 1898
- Preceded by: Fermin Jáudenes
- Succeeded by: Diego de los Rios

Personal details
- Born: Francisco Rizzo y Ramírez; November 28, 1831 Malta
- Died: February 20, 1910 (aged 78) Madrid, Spain

General Francisco Rizzo y Ramírez (November 28, 1831 – February 20, 1910) was the acting Spanish governor-general of the Philippines, from August 13 to September 1898, after the Battle of Manila. He relieved General Fermin Jáudenes as acting governor-general on August 13. Sources reported that Rizzo relocated the Spanish capital from Manila to Malolos, which was also Aguinaldo’s capital. An uneasy truce occurred between the remaining Spanish and Aguinaldo. The French Consulate in Manila considered General Rizzo "to be a good man, but lacks leadership qualities". During General Rizzo's tenure, General Elwell Otis relieved General Wesley Merritt on August 29, as Commander, Department of the Pacific, and as the U.S. Military Governor of the Philippine Islands. In General Otis’ reports, he never mentioned Governor-General Rizzo, but apparently communicated almost exclusively with Spanish General Diego de los Rios, who then commanded the remnants of the Spanish Army in the Visayas and southern Philippines. Rizzo was ultimately replaced by de los Rios as governor-general in September 1898.

Government offices
Preceded by Fermín Jáudenes	Governor-General and Captain General of the Philippines; August 13 – September, 1898	Succeeded by Diego de los Ríos
