= Édouard André (consul) =

Belgian diplomat

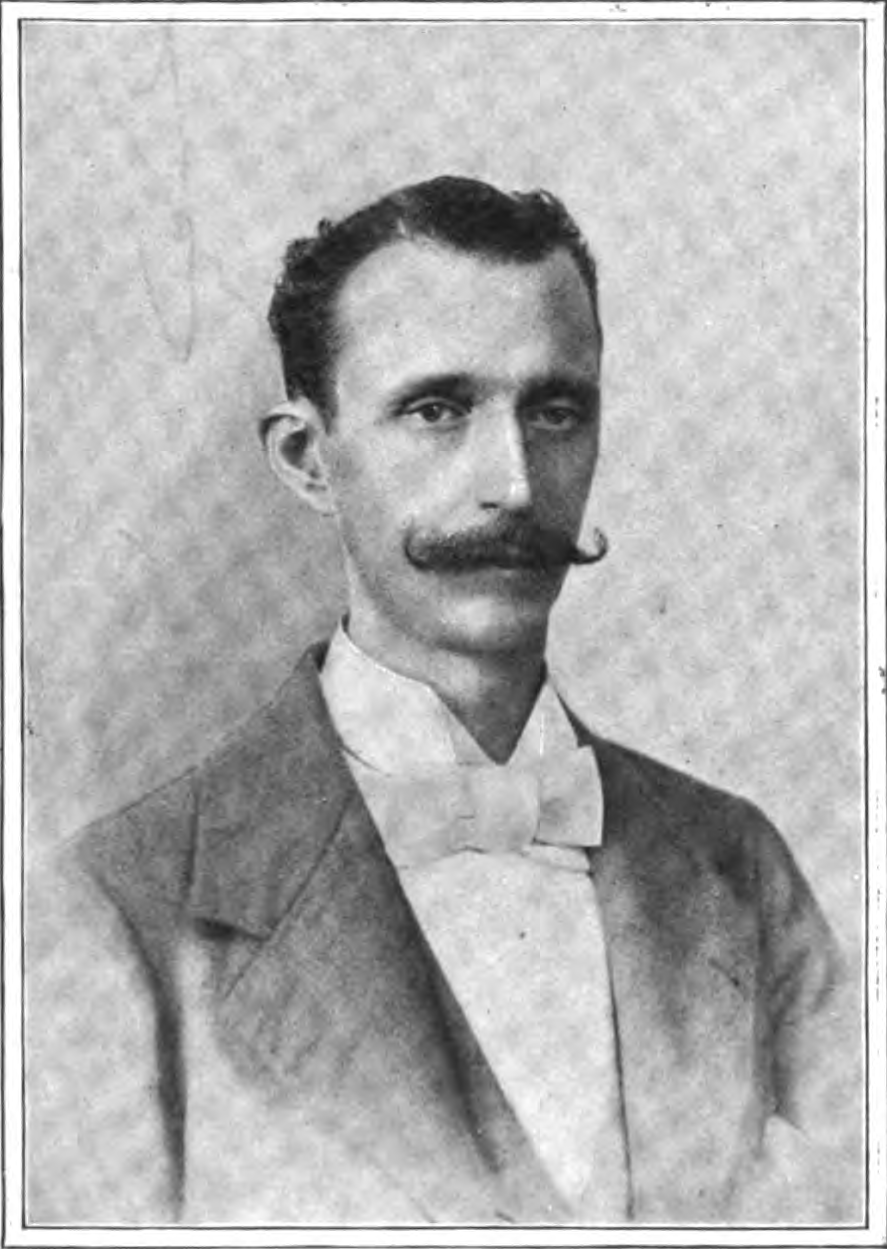

Édouard C. André was a Belgian consul to Manila in 1898. His services were sought by the American admiral George Dewey in order to assist in Spain's surrender of Manila after the mock Battle of Manila Bay. André took this role after the sickness and death of British consul Edward Henry Rawson-Walker, and acted as intermediary with the Spanish governor Fermín Jáudenes.
