= Diego de los Ríos =

Spanish general and colonial governor (1850-1911)

The Most Excellent Diego de los Ríos
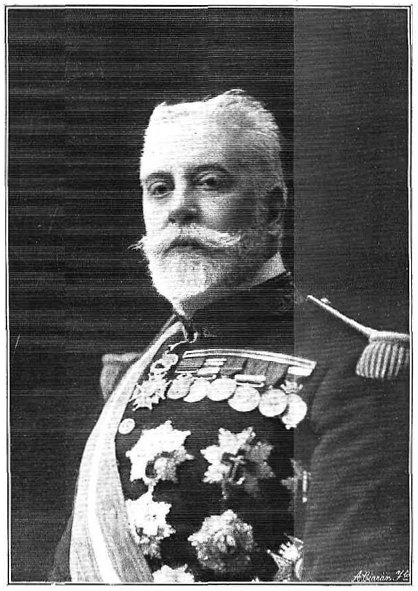

Chief of Staff of the Army of Spain
- In office 8 March 1909 – 14 January 1910
- Monarch: Alfonso XIII of Spain
- Prime Minister: Antonio Maura; Segismundo Moret
- Minister of War: Arsenio Linares y Pombo; Agustín de Luque y Coca
- Preceded by: Vicente Martitegui
- Succeeded by: Julián González Parrado

116th Governor-General of the Philippines
- In office 18 September 1898 – 3 June 1899
- Monarch: Alfonso XIII of Spain
- Regent: Maria Christina of Austria
- Prime Minister: Práxedes Mateo Sagasta
- Minister of Overseas: Vicente Romero Girón
- Preceded by: Francisco Rizzo
- Succeeded by: Jacob Gould Schurman (as Chairman of the First Philippine Commission) Emilio Aguinaldo (as President of Philippines)

Personal details
- Born: April 9, 1850 Guadalajara, Castilla–La Mancha, Spain
- Died: November 4, 1911 (aged 61) Madrid, Community of Madrid, Spain
- Spouse: Matilde Sáenz de Santa María y Torres

Military service
- Allegiance: Spain
- Branch/service: Spanish Army
- Years of service: 1860–1911
- Rank: Teniente general
- Battles/wars: Glorious Revolution; Third Carlist War; Ten Years' War; Spanish-American War

Diego de los Ríos y Nicolau (9 April 1850 – 4 November 1911) was a Spanish Lieutenant General who was known as the last Spanish Governor-General of the Philippines during the Spanish-American War. He also served in the Glorious Revolution, the Third Carlist War and the Ten Years' War.

== Military career ==
Diego was born on 9 April 1850 as the son of Lieutenant General Diego de los Rios the Elder and was given the title "Underage ensign of the Cavalry" in 1860 due to his fathers service in the Hispano-Moroccan War. In the same year, he specialized in infantry combat and was promoted to Lieutenant in 1865. In 1868, he participated in the Glorious Revolution and was promoted to Captain for his service in the revolution. For the next three years, he served in Puerto Rico. When he returned to the Spanish mainland, he participated in the Third Carlist War but was seriously wounded during the Battle of Castellfullit in July 1874 when he was promoted to Commander. After the treatment of his wound, he continued to fight the Carlist forces in the north, taking part in the battles of Sierra de Puyarruego, Ermita de la Trinidad de Lumbier and Sierra de Leire.

He was promoted to Lieutenant Colonel on 1876 but had to then serve in the ongoing Ten Years' War. Once he arrived in Cuba, he was in charge of several operations as he commanded several battalions until the Pact of Zanjón was signed and he returned to Spain to marry Matilde Sáenz Santa María. There he would serve various posts, including becoming King Alfonso XII's aide-de-camp in 1886, commanding the Ciudad Rodrigo Battalion in Madrid and dealing with the uprising of the Garellano and Albuera regiments on September 19 as he left with his unit under the orders of Captain General Manuel Pavía in pursuit of the rebels along the Paseo de Atocha, Vallecas, Morata de Tajuña and Arganda. For his service, he was proposed to the Ministry of State for the Commander of the Order of Isabella the Catholic. After his promotion to Brigadier General on 1895, he was sent to the Philippines under the command of Ramón Blanco who appointed him the commander of the First Brigade of the Mindanao Division.

== Governor-General of the Philippines ==
=== Government in Iloilo ===
In September 1898, he became the Governor-General of the Philippines during the Spanish–American War after the United States of America took control of Manila after the 1898 Battle of Manila. The capital of the Spanish Philippines was at that time in Iloilo. While fighting with the Americans was over, the Spanish authorities continued to fight the forces of the Philippine Revolution for control of the country outside of Manila and Manila Bay.

Desiring to save the Visayas and Mindanao from being conquered by Philippine revolutionary forces, de los Rios asked Spain to grant some reforms demanded by citizens of Iloilo. He issued in Iloilo a proclamation to the people of the Visayas calling on them to establish a "Council of Reforms" to be made up of 24 leading citizens, 12 of whom would be selected by popular vote and another 12 to be appointed by the governor-general himself. The granted reforms, however, satisfied only a few ilustrado leaders and the Philippine revolution in Iloilo heated up.

The general uprising against the Spanish authorities on Panay, particularly in Iloilo, took place on October 28, 1898. On that day onward, the interior towns of the province of Iloilo were liberated from Spanish control. By the first week of November, only Jaro, Molo, and Iloilo remained in the hands of the Spaniards. On November 21, Jaro was delivered by the Spanish government to the Ilonggo revolutionary forces.

With the Spanish army being besieged by the revolutionary troops in the positions which they held in Iloilo and Molo, and being threatened by a decisive attack, the Spanish government under De los Rios eventually opened up negotiations with the Ilonggos. The outcome of the negotiations was the evacuation of Molo and Iloilo City by the Spanish troops and their subsequent surrender to the native forces under the command of Gen. Martin Delgado at Plaza Alfonso XII (now Plaza Libertad) on 23 December 1898, which implied Iloilo City as the last capital of the Spanish Empire in Asia and the Pacific.

He left Iloilo and transferred temporarily to Real Fuerza de Nuestra Señora La Virgen del Pilar de Zaragoza in Zamboanga bringing with him the remnants of his colonial forces in the Visayas on the eve of the surrender of the Spanish forces in Visayas to the Ilonggo revolutionaries on December 24, 1898. Thereafter when moved to Zamboanga as his last bastion, he surrendered to the authorities.

=== In Zamboanga ===
The Governor-General upon his arrival at Fort Pilar on December 24, 1898, immediately made preparations for the defense against the Philippine revolutionaries. He brought the colonial forces from Cotabato and Lanao and consolidated them all at Fort Pilar. The Governor-General of Mindanao Island, General Jaramillo, transferred his command to General Montero, ex-governor of Cebu, and left for Manila with General Rios in Dec. 1898.

=== In Manila ===
General Diego de los Rios brought his troops to Manila in January 1899, before the troops' departure to Spain. The general remained in Manila until 3 June 1899, trying to secure the release of Spanish prisoners from the rebels. General Nicola Jaramillo then took over negotiations.

== Later Military Career ==
Upon his return to the Spanish mainland, he was appointed military governor of Seville in 1902 and was promoted to Lieutenant General in 1907. He held high civil and military positions as counselor of the Supreme War and Navy Council, Captain-General of Andalusia, chief of the Army Staff, senator for the Province of Cáceres and Captain-General of the First Military Region in 1909 which he commanded until his death.

Political offices
Preceded by Francisco Rizzo (Government in Manila)	Governor-General of the Philippines (Government in Iloilo); 18 September 1898–3 June 1899	Succeeded by Post abolished Emilio Aguinaldo - Philippine President (República Filipina) and Wesley Merritt - Military Governor of the Philippines (United States)
