= Fermín Jáudenes =

Spanish general (1836-1915)

The Most Excellent Fermín Jáudenes OIC
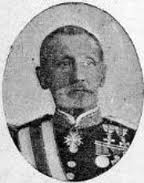

114th Governor-General of the Philippines
- In office July 24 – August 13, 1898
- Preceded by: Basilio Augustín
- Succeeded by: Francisco Rizzo; Wesley Merritt (as American Military Governor of the Philippines)

Personal details
- Born: July 7, 1836 A Coruña, Province of A Coruña
- Died: February 11, 1915 (aged 78) Logroño, La Rioja

Military service
- Allegiance: Spain
- Branch: Spanish Army
- Years of service: 1852–1898
- Rank: General de brigada
- Battles/wars: Hispano-Moroccan War; Third Carlist War; Spanish-American War

Fermín Jáudenes y Álvarez (July 7, 1836 – February 11, 1915) was a Spanish military officer and colonial administrator who served as Governor-General of the Philippines from July 24 to August 13, 1898, during the Spanish–American War and the second phase of the Philippine Revolution.

== Early life ==
Born on July 7, 1836, in a military officer's family in La Coruña. In May 1852, he entered the Infantry Academy and practiced in the Zaragoza Infantry Regiment. After graduation, he was stationed Vitoria-Gasteiz, Oviedo, Alicante, Valencia, Cartagena and Avila. In 1859, he went to Morocco to take part in the Hispano-Moroccan War. He repeatedly made several military exploits on the battlefield and was seriously injured which resulted in his promotion to Captain. Returning to Spain after the war in 1866, he suppressed an uprising in the San Gil barracks led by Juan Prim. From 1867, he served in the Northern Spanish Army, preventing the infiltration of Carlists during the Third Carlist War.

In 1872, he was promoted to Commander for his military exploits during the war. In 1874, he was promoted to Lieutenant Colonel of the Infantry due to his military exploits. In 1875, he commanded his own troops to participate in many battles in the Third Carlist War. In 1876, he was promoted to Colonel and commanded the 12th Infantry Regiment "Zaragoza". Thereafter, he was appointed head of the Burgos brigade and military governor of the Province of Logroño. Promoted to Brigadier General in 1889. In 1895, he served as the commander of the 1st Division of the 4th Army, the military governor of the province of Logroño, the commander of the 2nd Division of the 6th Army and the military commanders of Girona, Tarragona and Álava.

== Spanish-American War ==
During his term, Spain turned over the Philippine capital, Manila, to the United States Army in the "mock" Battle of Manila and in the process the Spanish surrendered to America, ending over 330 years of rule of Spanish colonial rule.

Jáudenes was in Manila when the Spanish parliament, the Cortes, learned of Governor-General Basilio Augustín's attempt to negotiate the surrender of the army to Filipinos under Emilio Aguinaldo. This caused Augustin's removal on July 24, 1898, and the appointment of Jáudenes. By Royal Decree of October 5, 1898, Jaúdenes was removed from all his positions and after his return to Madrid, tried in the Supreme Council of War and Navy for his surrender of the Plaza de Manila. As a result, he was separated from service and was forced to retire.

Political offices
Preceded by Basilio Augustín	Governor-General of the Philippines; July 24 – August 13, 1898	Succeeded by Francisco Rizzo
