= Basilio Augustín =

Spanish Governor-General of the Philippines

The Most Excellent Basilio Augustín
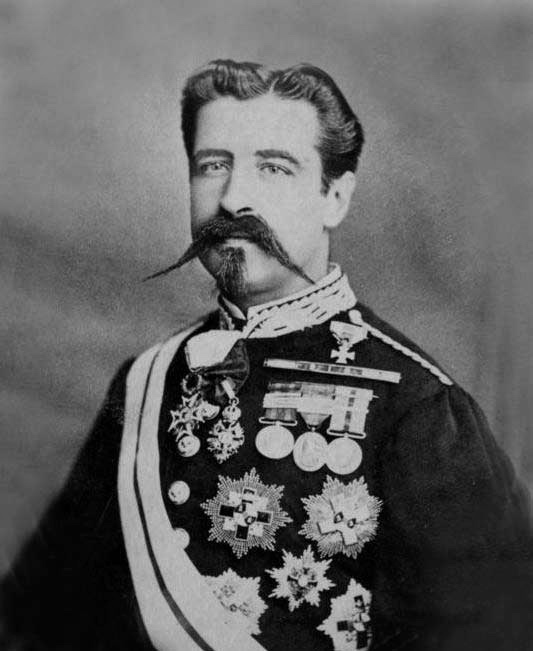

113th Governor-General of the Philippines
- In office April 11 – July 24, 1898
- Preceded by: Fernando Primo de Rivera
- Succeeded by: Fermín Jáudenes

Personal details
- Born: February 12, 1840 Cádiz, Province of Cádiz
- Died: August 7, 1910 (aged 70) Vitoria-Gasteiz, Álava

Basilio Augustín y Dávila (February 12, 1840 – August 7, 1910) was a Spanish colonial administrator who served as Governor-General of the Philippines from April 11 to July 24, 1898.

He was born in Cádiz on February 12, 1840. On April 11, 1898, Augustín was appointed as Governor-General of the Philippines. During his tenure, the Spanish–American War began, which he claimed would be "short" and Spain would gain a "decisive" victory. Spanish forces were decisively defeated by the United States Navy in the Battle of Manila Bay, which led to the return of Filipino revolutionary Emilio Aguinaldo from exile and the beginning of the second phase of the Philippine Revolution, during which, on June 12, 1898, Aguinaldo issued the Philippine Declaration of Independence.

Augustín attempted to establish a consultative assembly of Filipino Ilustrados loyal to Spain and form a new militia, promoting autonomy to uphold Spanish colonial rule. He offered one million pesos to Aguinaldo in exchange for giving up but the latter refused. However, it did gain support from high-ranking Filipino revolutionaries such as Artemio Ricarte due to the efforts of Pedro Paterno. He stopped being Governor-General on July 24, 1898.

His plans for reform ended in failure as most of the Spanish-trained Filipino militia deserted to the revolutionaries, and his consultative assembly finally dissolved in 1899, with most of its members becoming signers of the Malolos Constitution and members of the Malolos Congress. In August 1898, the United States Army occupied Manila, and in December 1898 Spain signed the Treaty of Paris, transferring the disputed sovereignty over the Philippines to the United States. In 1899, the Philippine–American War began between American and Philippine revolutionary forces. Augustín returned to Spain, where he died at Vitoria-Gasteiz, Álava on August 7, 1910.

Government offices
Preceded by Fernando Primo de Rivera, 1st Marquis of Estella	Governor-General of the Philippines; April 11 – July 24, 1898	Succeeded by Fermín Jáudenes
