= Gaspar de la Torre y Ayala =

Spanish colonial governor (d. 1745)

Don Gaspar Antonio de la Torre y Ayala
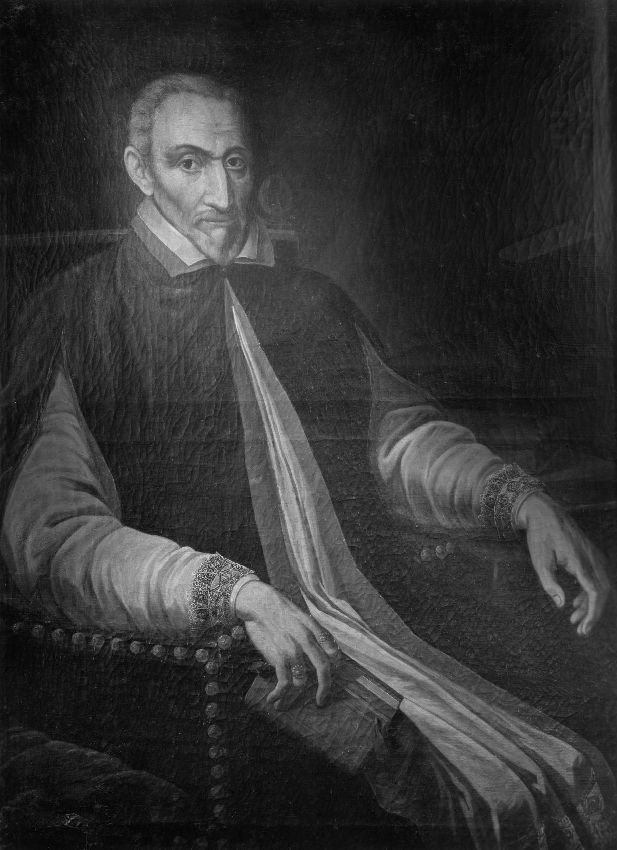

41st Governor-General of the Philippines
- In office July 1739 – 21 September 1745
- Monarch: Philip V
- First Secretary of State: Marquess of Villarías
- Secretary of State for the Navy and Indies: Mateo Pablo Díaz de Lavandero; Marquess of Villarías
- Viceroy of New Spain: Juan Antonio de Vizarrón y Eguiarreta; Pedro de Castro y Figueroa y Salazar; Pedro Malo de Villavicencio (as interim); Pedro Cebrián y Agustín
- Preceded by: Fernándo Valdés y Tamón
- Succeeded by: Archbishop Juan de Arechederra

Personal details
- Born: 1697 Flanders
- Died: September 21, 1745 (aged 47–48) Manila

Military service
- Rank: Brigadier general

Gaspar Antonio de la Torre y Ayala served as the Spanish Governor-General of the Philippines from July 1739 until his death on 21 September 1745.

== As Governor-General of the Philippines ==
Gaspar de la Torre arrived in the Philippines with the mission to urge the Sultan of Sulu Azim ud-Din (alternatively spelled as Alimuddin) to fulfill an earlier peace treaty signed in 1737 drawn by the previous Governor-General Fernándo Valdés y Tamon and to allow missionaries to carry out their evangelizing work. To this end, he dispatched the Jesuit friars Francisco Sazi and Tomás de Arrevillaga who obtained guarantees from the Sultan that they would be allowed to safely preach.

There were continued incursions from pirates based from Sulu and Mindanao leading the governor-general to retaliate harshly.

In 1744, he faced a revolt led by Francisco Dagohoy who had several grievances against Spanish authorities and members of the Roman Catholic Church. Dagohoy took up arms on the island of Bohol. Francisco Dagohoy, his followers, and eventually their successors would continue to rebel for 85 years until 1829. The Dagohoy Rebellion became known as the longest rebellion against Spanish authorities in Philippine history.

Gaspar de la Torre died on 21 September 1745. By virtue of a royal decree issued earlier on 15 August 1734, the highest governing person in the Philippine Islands was to take responsibility of running the government in case of death of the incumbent governor-general. By consequence, the position of acting governor-general of the Philippines was occupied by Archbishop Juan de Arechederra, Bishop-elect of Nueva Segovia, upon Gaspar de la Torre's death. In addition to the position of governor-general, the Archbishop also assumed the position as president ad interim of the Real Audiencia on the same day.

== See also ==
- Juan de Arechederra
- Francisco Dagohoy
- Dagohoy Rebellion

== Sources ==
- Baquillas, José Barrado. Actas del II Congreso Internacional sobre los Dominicos y el Nuevo Mundo, Salamanca, 28 de marzo-1 de abril de 1989. Volume 6 of Los Dominicos y América, 1990.

Government offices
Preceded by Fernándo Valdés y Tamon	Governor-General of the Philippines; 1739-1745	Succeeded by Juan de Arechederra
