= Francisco Antonio de Echávarri =

Francisco Antonio de Echávarri (Vitoria-Gasteiz, Euskadi) was a Spanish colonial official in New Spain. He was president of the Audiencia of Mexico City in 1760 when Viceroy Agustín de Ahumada died in office. In that capacity, Echávarri served as acting viceroy until the arrival of Francisco Cajigal de la Vega, Ahumada's successor. He served from February 5, 1760 to April 28, 1760.

Echávarri was a knight of the Order of Santiago. Before becoming an oidor, he had served in New Spain for some time.

== As inspector of mines in Zacatecas ==
Echávarri reported to Viceroy Pedro de Castro y Figueroa in a letter dated 1741 about the state of affairs in the mines in Zacatecas. In 1739 he had been appointed visitador by the viceroy to investigate and end abuses and violations of the Law of Mines by the mineowners and to end the numerous disputes over ownership of the mines and land. In his report, he claimed that "In Nueva Galicia power has degenerated into tyranny."

His investigation was opposed by powerful mining interests, in particular the powerful Count of San Mateo Valaparaíso and his allies. Faced with the supporters of the Count in Zacatecas and among the oidores of the Audiencia of Guadalajara (as well as the support of one previous viceroy, Archbishop Juan Antonio de Vizarrón y Eguiarreta), Echávarri was unable to accomplish much. It is significant that in this on-going investigation (from 1739 to 1751), the central government of the colony took no action against the mineowners.

Echávarri was also in charge of the construction of an aqueduct from Tlalnepantla to supply water to Villa de Guadalupe, site of the veneration of the Virgin of Guadalupe. Work began on this project on June 22, 1743, and it was completed on July 7, 1751.

== The main controversy during his administration of New Spain ==
Later Echávarri became president of the Audiencia of Mexico, a position of authority in the colony second only to that of the viceroy. Although the Audiencia was a legal court, the highest in the colony, and although the oidores were judges, the body also exercised important legislative and sometimes executive powers in the government of New Spain.

One of the duties of the oidores was the weekly inspection of the prisons, to investigate the condition of the premises and to guarantee good treatment of the prisoners. They did this in the four prisons of "ordinary jurisdiction." The judges accepted spoken or written complaints from the prisoners, and they were authorized to dispense justice in situ, changing sentences when needed. One important consequence of this system was that it served as a check on and appeal from judges of lower courts.

These prison visits were a grave matter for the judges. At the beginning of the reign of King Charles III (1759), Echávarri, being then president of the Audiencia, asked to be relieved of the duty because he was much occupied with the other duties of acting viceroy and captain general of the colony. There was a precedent for this; Audiencia President Pedro Malo de Villavicencio had been excused in 1739 when he temporarily succeeded Viceroy Pedro de Castro y Figueroa. However, the Audiencia refused to grant Echávarri's request, citing differences between the two situations.

Echávarri in turn wrote the king, saying that many of the oidores who rejected his proposal had voted to accept that of Malo de Villavicencio and that the document exempting Malo had disappeared from the archives. Echávarri told the king that he believed the oidores had voted against him personally, and that they would have approved an exemption for a different individual in the same circumstances.

The Council of the Indies, on behalf of King Charles, rejected Echávarri's complaint, and stressed that every oidor, without exception, was obligated to attend the prison inspections, as one of the most important duties of the office. This decision was given October 23, 1762; the controversy had dragged on for some time. The Council went so far as to condemn the exception given Malo de Villavicencio more than twenty years before, claiming that the Audiencia had no authority to grant it.

== After serving as interim viceroy ==
Echávarri relinquished his temporary position to Francisco Cajigal de la Vega upon the latter's arrival in Mexico. Cajigal had been governor of Cuba at the time of the death of Viceroy Ahumada y Villalón. The Audiencia possessed sealed orders to be opened on Ahumada's death, and these named Cajigal to fill the position (also on an interim basis). He sailed from Havana for Veracruz on March 28, 1760. He made his solemn entry into Mexico City April 28, 1760 and took up the government.

== See also ==
- List of Viceroys of New Spain
- Agustín de Ahumada y Villalón
- Francisco Cajigal de la Vega
