= Juan Francisco de Güemes, 1st Count of Revillagigedo =

Mexican politician

The Most Excellent General Juan Francisco Güemes 1st Count of Revilla Gigedo KOS
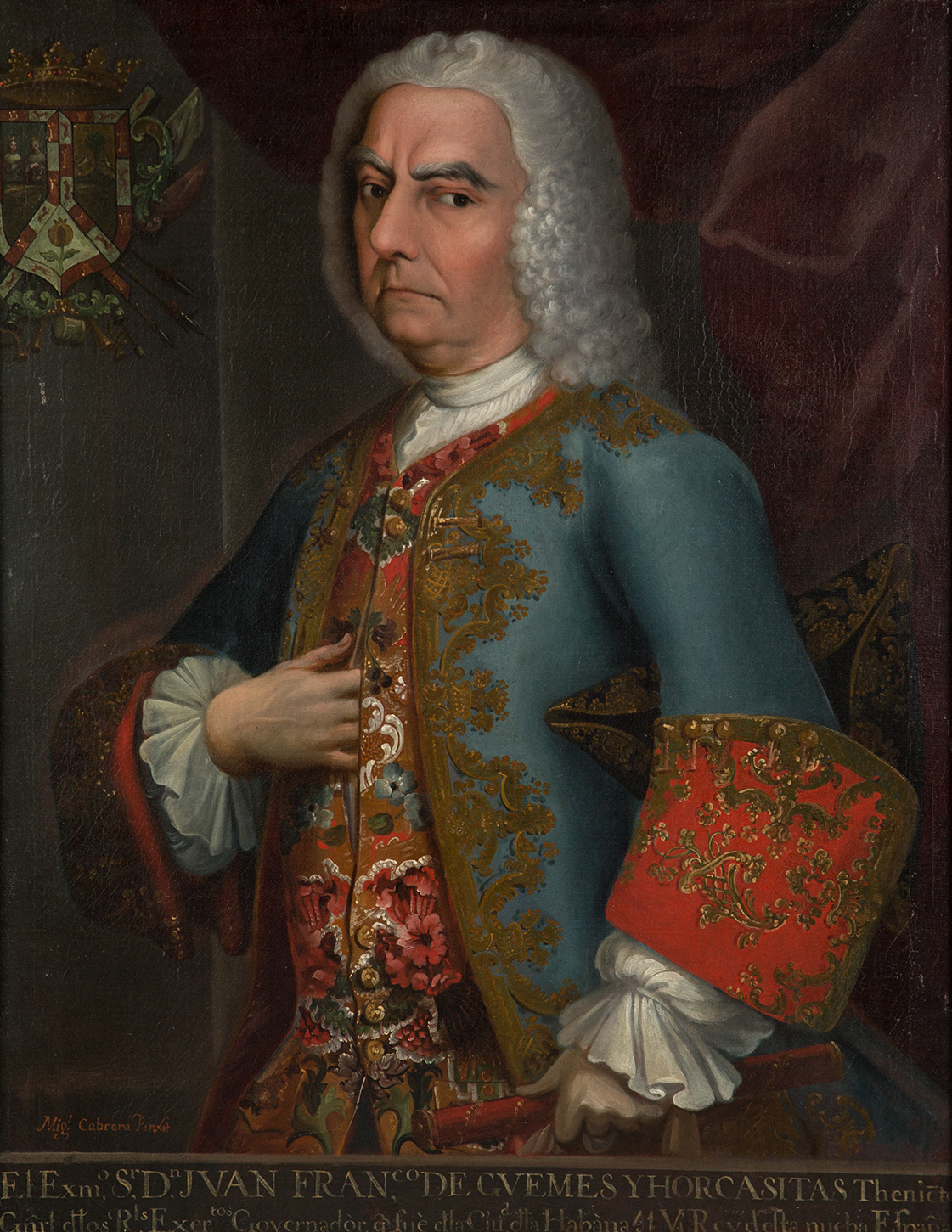
- Portrait by Miguel Cabrera

41st Viceroy of New Spain
- In office 9 July 1746 – 9 November 1755
- Monarch: Ferdinand VI
- First Secretary of State: José de Carvajal; Duke of Huéscar (as interim); Ricardo Wall
- Secretary of State for the Indies: Ricardo Wall (as interim); Julián de Arraiga y Ribera
- Secretary of State for the Navy and the Indies: Marquis of Ensenada
- Preceded by: The Count of Fuenclara
- Succeeded by: Agustín de Ahumada

53rd Governor of Cuba
- In office 18 March 1734 – 22 April 1746
- Monarch: Philip V
- First Secretary of State: José de Patiño y Rosales; Marquis of Villarías
- Secretary of State for the Navy and the Indies: José de Patiño y Rosales; Mateo Pablo Díaz de Lavandero; Marquis of Villarías; Marquess of Ensenada
- Viceroy of New Spain: Juan Antonio Vizarrón; Pedro de Castro Figueroa y Salazar; Pedro Malo de Villavicencio (President of the Audiencia); Pedro Cebrián y Agustín
- Preceded by: Dionisio Martínez de la Vega
- Succeeded by: Juan Antonio Tineo y Fuertes

65th Viceroy of Navarre
- In office 1 December 1759 – 6 November 1760
- Monarch: Charles III
- First Secretary of State: José de Patiño y Rosales; Marquis of Villarías
- Secretary of State for War: Ricardo Wall
- Preceded by: Luis González de Albelda y Cayro
- Succeeded by: Juan de Lerín (as interim)

Personal details
- Born: 16 May 1681 Reinosa, Cantabria
- Died: 27 November 1766 (aged 85) Madrid, Spain
- Spouse: Antonia Ceferina Pacheco de Padilla y Aguayo
- Children: Juan Vicente de Güemes
- Parent(s): Francisco Güemes y Gordón (father); Francisca de Horcasitas y Sáinz de Villa (mother)

Military service
- Allegiance: (Spain) Spanish Empire
- Branch/service: (Spain) Spanish Army
- Years of service: 1727–1766
- Rank: General
- Battles/wars: Anglo-Spanish War (1727–1729): Thirteenth siege of Gibraltar; Spanish-Barbary wars: Spanish conquest of Oran

Juan Francisco de Güemes y Horcasitas (Spanish: Juan Francisco de Güemes y Horcasitas, primer conde de Revillagigedo) (16 May 1681, Reinosa, Cantabria – 27 November 1766, Madrid) was a Spanish general, governor of Havana, captain general of Cuba, and viceroy of New Spain (from 9 July 1746 to 9 November 1755).

== Early career ==
Juan Francisco de Güemes y Horcasitas was the first count of Revillagigedo (sometimes spelled Revilla Gigedo), and a lieutenant general in the army. He participated in the siege of Gibraltar and the conquest of Oran. In 1734 he was named captain general of Havana, where he repulsed the attacks of the English, organized the cavalry, and improved the fortifications. While serving in this position, he was named viceroy of New Spain.

== As viceroy of New Spain ==
In New Spain, he presided at the funeral honors of the old king, Philip V, and proclaimed the new king, Ferdinand VI. He encouraged the colonization of Nuevo Santander (now Tamaulipas). Under his authority Colonel José de Escandón established eleven towns of Spanish and Indians and four missions, naming them variously for the surnames of the viceroy, the viceroy's wife, María Josefa Llera, and himself. Escandón was rewarded by the Crown for these services with the title of Conde de Sierra Gorda.

On 8 July 1750 the ruins of Palenque were discovered. On 8 May 1753 Miguel Hidalgo y Costilla was born in Guanajuato.

In 1750 famine struck Guanajuato and Zacatecas, followed by an epidemic. The following year a rebellion broke out among the Pimas in Sonora, and in order to suppress the rebellion, presidios were established at Altar and Tubac. On 13 May 1752 a near-total eclipse of the sun was observed in New Spain. This caused consternation among the population, because it was viewed as a portent of disaster.

== Reforms ==
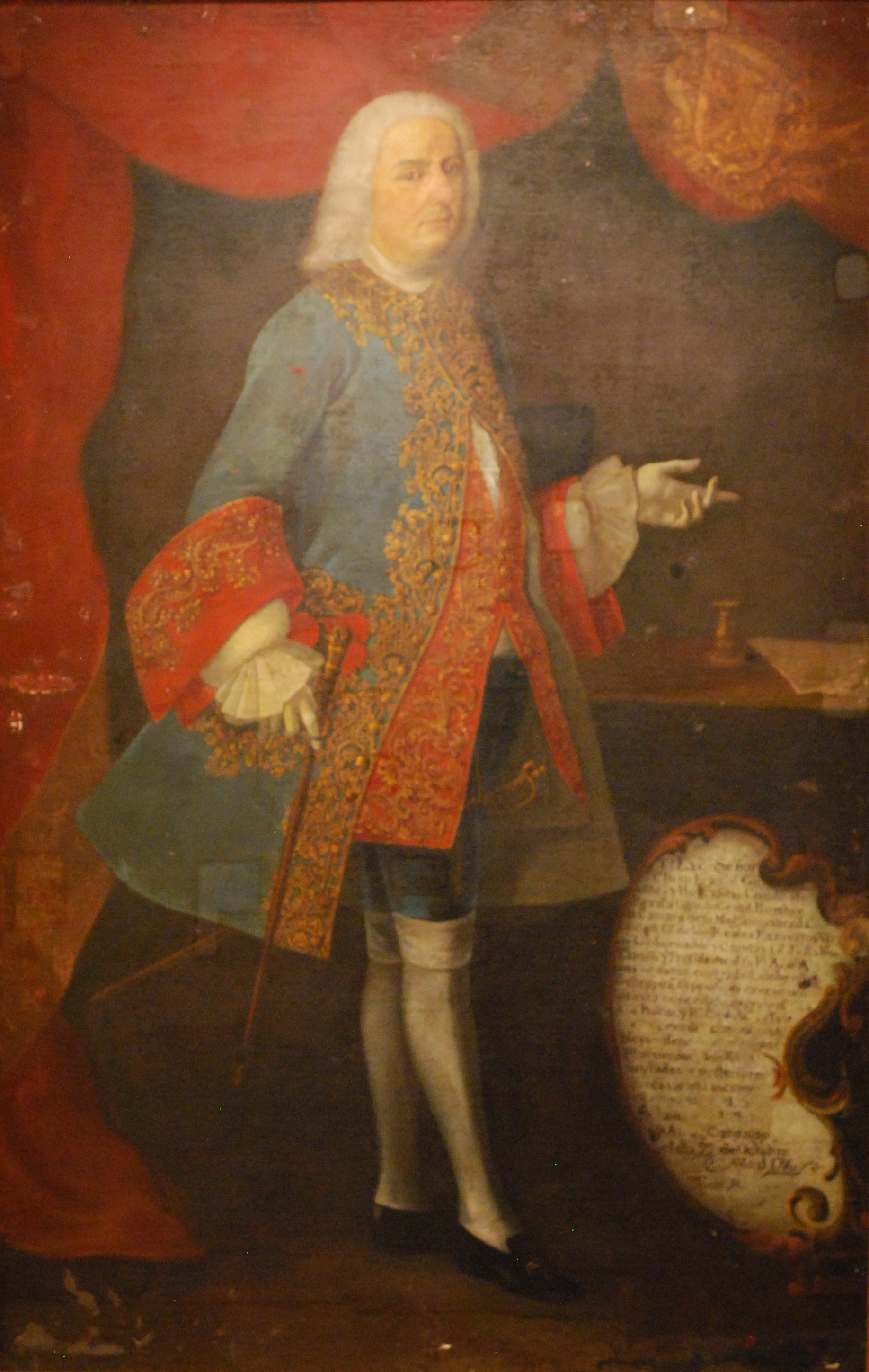
Juan Francisco de Güemes, 1st Count of Revillagigedo, Viceroy of New Spain

He reformed the administration of the treasury of the colony in 1746. Because a large portion of the circulating coinage had been sent to Spain, he ordered the minting of 150,000 pesos for circulation in Florida (1746). He reauthorized playing cards, banned by his predecessor, in order to increase revenue from their taxation.

Because smuggling was still rampant, he ordered close inspection of all ships arriving in port. This measure was ineffective, however. The smugglers used small boats and made landings on deserted beaches, transferring their illegal goods to confederates in the colony. Because of complaints from Spanish merchants, chiefly in America, Spain broke relations with the Hanseatic League. The viceroy prohibited Hanseatic ships from anchoring in Veracruz. When this legal source of a large quantity of merchandise was blocked, smuggling rose. It was said that even the vicereine dressed in contraband cloth from England or from Flanders.

Güemes y Horcasitas earned a reputation for governing efficiently and honorably. He took steps to ensure that government employees met the obligations of their offices. He increased the revenues of the government, even though revenue from the mines decreased due to the scarcity of mercury (for extracting silver). He increased the size of the fleet protecting shipping between Veracruz and Havana.

With the expansion of commerce and the decrease in piracy after the end of the war with England, mercury from Spanish mines began flowing into New Spain in sufficient quantities to raise the production of silver back to pre-shortage levels.

He reorganized the management of official documents and required that civil and religious affairs be handled independently. These reforms are considered the foundation of what became the General Archives of Mexico.

He was accused of having accumulated an enormous personal fortune while in office, but when he left, he left a large surplus in the treasury, and a wealth of stores and provisions.

== Foreign affairs ==
Spain was at war with England again (the War of the Austrian Succession), and news was received in Mexico City that a fleet of 17 ships of the line and transports had been assembled at Portsmouth under Admiral Richard Lestock, for an invasion of Spanish possessions in America. The information did not include where the English intended to make a landing, so the viceroy worked to prepare all the provinces under his jurisdiction to repulse an attack.

A preliminary peace was signed on 30 April 1748. Spain was required to pay its debts to England, and England to return the Spanish possessions it had captured. New Spain's military expenses suddenly decreased, and the bonus was used for such projects as the colonization of Nuevo Santander.

While maintaining good relations with France, he vigilantly prevented French encroachments on the territory of New Spain. The garrisons in Texas were strengthened. In 1755 he founded a presidio at Horcasitas (Sonora) for the purpose of controlling the Apaches.

== Return to Spain ==
After turning over the government to his successor, Agustín de Ahumada, Güemes returned to Spain, where he was made captain general of the army. He was proposed as viceroy of New Granada and of Navarre, and was president of the council of Castile and president of the council of war.

Government offices
Preceded by Dionisio Martínez de la Vega	Governor of Cuba; 1734–1746	Succeeded by Juan Antonio Tineo y Fuertes
Preceded by The Count of Fuenclara	Viceroy of New Spain; 1746–1755	Succeeded by Agustín de Ahumada y Villalón, Marquis of las Amarillas
Spanish nobility
New title	Count of Revillagigedo; 1749–1766	Succeeded by Juan Vicente de Güemes
