= Villaseñor =

Villaseñor or Villasenor is a Spanish surname. Notable people with the name include:

- Fabián Villaseñor (born 1982), Mexican footballer
- Joey Villaseñor (born 1975), American martial-arts fighter
- José Antonio Villaseñor y Sánchez, 18th-century cartographer of New Spain
- Melissa Villaseñor (born 1987), American comedian and Saturday Night Live cast member
- Rico Villasenor, American bass player
- Captain don Juan de Villaseñor y Orozco Tovar (1500 - 1576), was a Conqueror of New Spain that served under The conquistador Hernan Cortés.
- Don Miguel Gregorio Antonio Francisco Ignacio Hidalgo-Costilla y Gallaga Mandarte Villaseñor (1753–1811), more commonly known as Don Miguel Hidalgo y Costilla or Miguel Hidalgo, was a New Spanish Roman Catholic priest and a leader of the Mexican War of Independence.
