= Horcasitas =

Horcasitas is a surname. Notable people with the surname include:

- Juan Francisco de Güemes y Horcasitas, 1st Count of Revillagigedo (1681–1766), Spanish general, governor of Havana, captain general of Cuba, and viceroy of New Spain
- Juan Molinar Horcasitas (1955–2015), Mexican academic, civil servant and politician
- Juan Vicente de Güemes Padilla Horcasitas y Aguayo, 2nd Count of Revillagigedo (1740–1799), Spanish military officer and viceroy of New Spain

== See also ==
- San Miguel de Horcasitas Municipality, Sonora, Mexico
- San Miguel de Horcasitas, a town in the municipality
