= Francisco Cajigal de la Vega =

Mexican politician

Francisco Vega
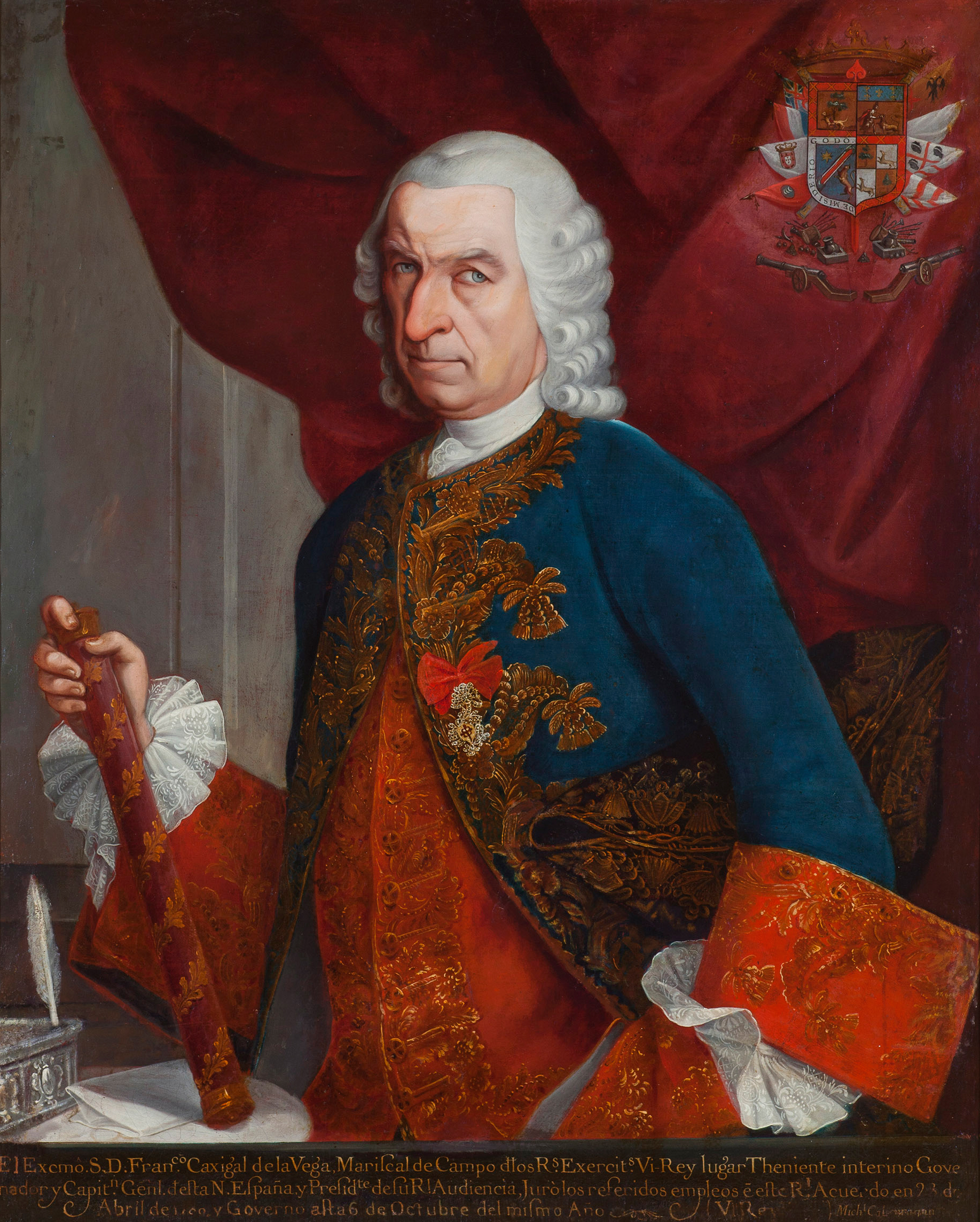

43rd Viceroy of New Spain
- In office 28 April 1760 – 6 October 1760
- Monarch: Charles III
- First Secretary of State: Ricardo Wall
- Secretary of State for the Indies: Julián de Arriaga y Ribera
- Preceded by: Francisco Echavarri
- Succeeded by: Joaquin Montserrat

56th Governor of Cuba
- In office 9 June 1747 – 18 May 1760
- Monarchs: Ferdinand VI; Charles III
- First Secretary of State: José de Carvajal; Duke of Huéscar (as interim); Ricardo Wall
- Secretary of State for the Indies: Ricardo Wall (as interim); Julían de Arriaga y Ribera
- Secretary of State for the Navy and Indies: Marquis of Ensenada
- Viceroy of New Spain: Juan Francisco de Güemes; Agustín de Ahumada; Francisco Antonio de Echávarri (as Dean of the Audiencia); Himself
- Preceded by: Diego Penalosa
- Succeeded by: Pedro Alonso (as interim)

Personal details
- Born: 6 February 1691 Hoz de Anero, Ribamontán al Monte, Cantabria, Spain
- Died: 30 April 1777 (aged 86) Cantabria, Spain
- Children: Juan Manuel

Military service
- Allegiance: Spain
- Branch/service: (Spain) Spanish Army
- Years of service: 1727–1762
- Rank: General
- Battles/wars: Anglo-Spanish War (1727–1729): Thirteenth siege of Gibraltar; Spanish-Barbary wars: Spanish conquest of Oran; Seven Years' War: Spanish invasion of Portugal

Francisco Cajigal de la Vega (February 6, 1691 – 30 April 1777) was a Spanish Army officer and colonial administrator who served as governor of Cuba from 1747 to 1760, and interim viceroy of New Spain, from April 28, 1760 to October 5, 1760, succeeded by Viceroy Joaquín de Montserrat, marqués de Cruillas.

Cajigal was lieutenant general in the Spanish Army and a knight of the Order of Santiago. He was appointed as governor of Cuba in 1747, and during his time in the colony owned several slaves, including Briton Hammon.

He was governor of Cuba in 1760 at the time of the death of the previous viceroy, Agustín de Ahumada. The Audiencia possessed sealed orders to be opened on the death of Ahumada, and these named Cajigal to fill the position on an interim basis. He sailed from Havana for Veracruz on March 28, 1760. He remained in Veracruz a few days awaiting the arrival of the vehicle intended to take him to Mexico City. He made his solemn entry into Mexico City on April 28, 1760 and took up the government.

He worked to reform the accounting at the treasury. He removed the sales tax on products of iron and steel to stimulate construction and the mining of that metal. To augment revenue, he sold the monopoly on the production of playing cards and farmed out the collection of customs duties at Veracruz for five years. Other measures spurred the economy of La Florida and Panzacola (Pensacola).

He increased the regular army of New Spain to 2,921 men. He named his son, Juan Manuel, commander of the cavalry company of the viceregal guards.

On the ascension of Charles III to the Spanish throne, a general amnesty was declared. In New Spain, at least, it did not free many prisoners because there were many exceptions.

This viceroy was not considered very honorable. He insisted on a very high salary (at the rate of 40,000 pesos per year) and huge expenses for his return journey from Mexico to Havana (6,000 pesos).

He turned over the government of the colony to his successor, Joaquín de Montserrat, marqués de Cruillas on October 5, 1760 and returned to Havana, where he took up his old position.

Government offices
Preceded by Diego Peñalosa	Spanish Governor of Cuba; 1747 - 1760	Succeeded by Pedro Alonso
Preceded by Agustín de Ahumada	Viceroy of New Spain; 1760	Succeeded by Joaquín de Montserrat
