= Pedro Cebrián, 5th Count of Fuenclara =

Spanish diplomat and viceroy of New Spain (1687-1752)

The Most Excellent The Count of Fuenclara
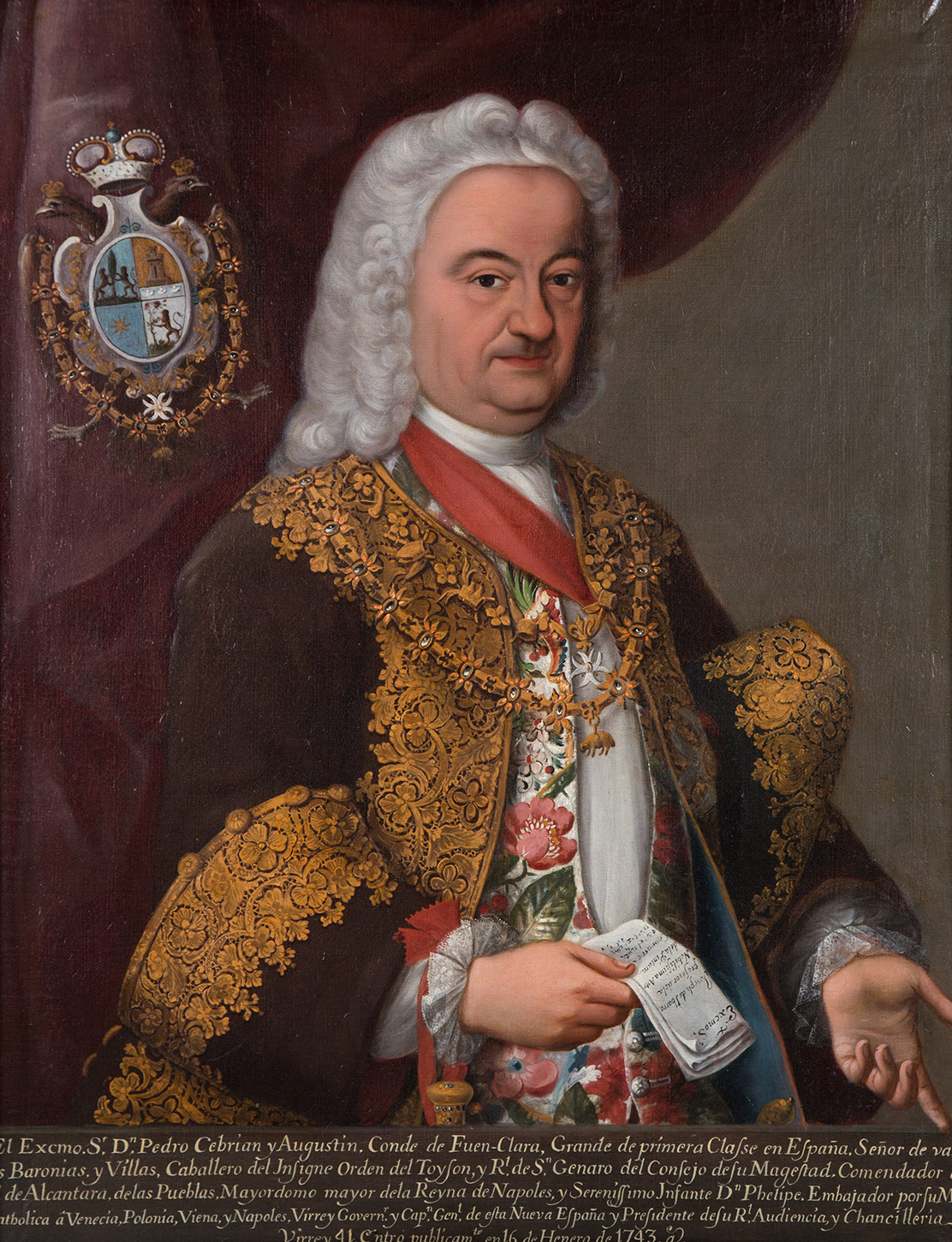
- Portrait by José de Ibarra

40th Viceroy of New Spain
- In office November 3, 1742 – July 8, 1746
- Monarch: Philip V
- Preceded by: The Duke of la Conquista
- Succeeded by: The Count of Revillagigedo

Personal details
- Born: April 30, 1687 Luceni, Spain
- Died: August 22, 1752 (aged 65) Madrid, Spain
- Spouse: María Teresa Patiño

Pedro Cebrián y Agustín, 5th Count of Fuenclara, Grandee of Spain, (April 30, 1687 in Luceni, Spain – August 22, 1752 in Madrid) was a Spanish diplomat and viceroy of New Spain, from November 3, 1742 to July 8, 1746.

== Early life ==
He was Spanish ambassador extraordinary to the courts of Vienna, Dresden and Naples. He was majordomo and equerry to the Infante Don Felipe. He was honored with membership in the orders of the Golden Fleece, 1738, and San Gennaro. On January 31, 1742, King Philip V of Spain personally named Cebrián viceroy of New Spain.

== As Viceroy of New Spain ==
He arrived in Veracruz on October 5, 1742. He made his solemn entry into the capital on November 3, 1742 and took up his office. He replaced Pedro Malo de Villavicencio, president of the royal Audiencia, who had been filling in since the death of the previous viceroy, Pedro de Castro y Figueroa, Duke of la Conquista.

As viceroy, he repaired the aqueduct from Chapultepec to Salta del Agua and paved many streets in Mexico City. He repaired and widened the Calzada de San Antonio Abad. He also established the estancos (government monopolies) in gunpowder, salt mines, ice and juego de gallos (cockfighting). He banned cards and dice.

In accordance with instructions from Spain, Cebrián y Agustín gathered ethnological, historical and statistical information about the colony. He directed the geographer José Antonio Villaseñor y Sánchez to prepare an official estimate of the population of New Spain, to be transmitted to the Court. The estimate was completed in April 1744, and the population was found to be 3,865,000. Another result of this information-gathering was Villaseñor's book, Theatro Americano, descripción general de los reinos y provincias de la Nueva España (2 vols., 1746–48). The work is a very valuable source for colonial historians.

On June 2, 1743, after an investigation, he imprisoned the Italian knight Lorenzo Boturini Bernaducci (1702–53). Boturini had been soliciting public donations to crown the Virgin of Guadalupe with a gold crown, and also of introducing papal documents without a royal permit. At the time of his arrest, various valuable documents, codices, and writings about antique cultures that Boturini had collected were confiscated, and never returned to him. In 1744 Boturini was sent to Spain, where he established his good intentions and was freed. The king named him historian of the Indies. He even received permission to return to New Spain. In Madrid he wrote a history of ancient Mexico, unpublished at the time of his death in 1753.

On July 1, 1743, Spanish treasure galleon Nuestra Señora de Covadonga was captured by the Royal Navy fourth-rate Centurion under the command of George Anson off the Philippines as it was en route from Manila to New Spain. The galleon's cargo, which included 1,318,843 Spanish dollars, was captured, and Anson sold his prize in China for £400,000. Cebrián was accused of treason after news of the galleon's capture reached New Spain, but nothing came of the accusation and the matter eventually subsided.

In 1744 there was a riot in Puebla over a minor religious point. The viceroy, in order to dignify his visit to the bishop, had ordered the bells rung. The population interpreted this as a sign of the canonization of a previous bishop, Juan de Palafox y Mendoza, which many people had been campaigning for. When that turned out not to be the case, they rioted. The viceroy ordered the troops of the garrison to suppress the riot, and there were injuries. The viceroy was criticized for this decision.

=== Escandón expedition ===
In the 1740s Spain, because of encroachments of the French from Louisiana and the English along the Gulf coast, decided that they would have to complete the conquest of the Seno Mexicano (the Gulf coast, especially Tamaulipas and Texas). A council of war meeting was held to consider this project from May 8 to 13, 1743. Various officers presented plans, and that of José de Escandón was chosen as the most comprehensive. The viceroy sent this expedition to explore and colonize Nuevo Santander (Tamaulipas), which left Mexico City on March 5, 1744.

He became sick. He asked to be relieved his position and returned to Spain in July 1746. He died in Madrid August 6, 1752.

== See also ==
- José de Escandón
- Lorenzo Boturini Bernaducci

== Sources ==
- Hobbs, Nicolas (2007). "Grandes de España" (in Spanish). Archived from the original on November 29, 2006.
- Instituto de Salazar y Castro. Elenco de Grandezas y Titulos Nobiliarios Españoles (in Spanish). periodic publication.
- Cebrián y Agustín, Pedro. Enciclopedia de México (in Spanish). Vol. 3. Mexico City. 1988. ISBN 1-56409-016-7.
- García Purón, Manuel (1984). México y sus gobernantes (in Spanish). Vol. 1. Mexico City: Joaquín Porrua.
- Orozco Linares, Fernando (1985). Gobernantes de México (in Spanish). Mexico City: Panorama Editorial. ISBN 968-38-0260-5.
- Orozco Linares, Fernando (1988). Fechas Históricas de México (in Spanish). Mexico City: Panorama Editorial. ISBN 968-38-0046-7.

Government offices
Preceded by The Duke of la Conquista	Viceroy of New Spain; 1742-1746	Succeeded by The Count of Revillagigedo
Spanish nobility
Preceded by José Cebrián	Count of Fuenclara; 1720-1752	Succeeded by María Hipólita Cebrián
