= Agustín de Ahumada, 2nd Marquess of Amarillas =

Mexican politician

The Most Excellent The Marquess of Amarillas KOS
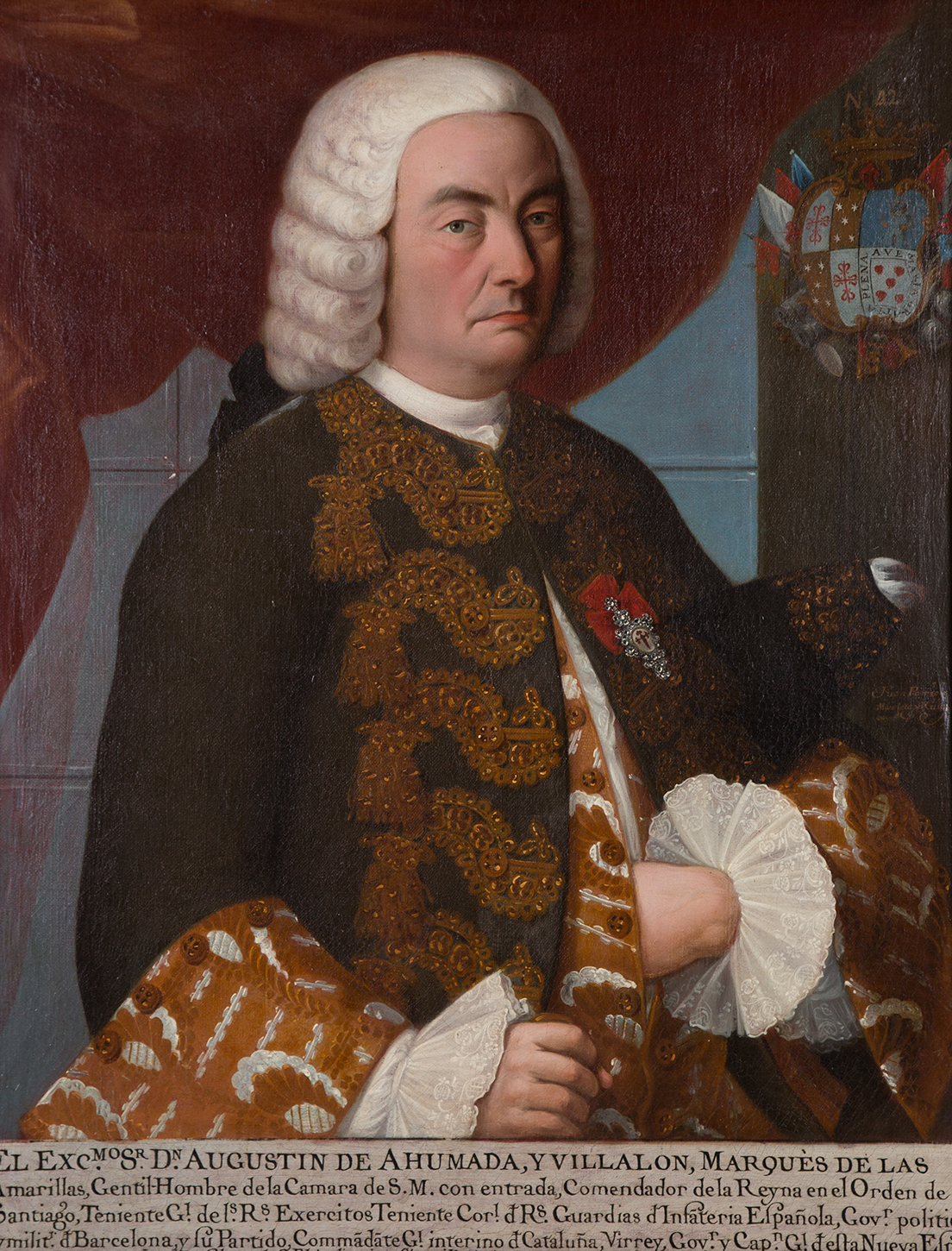
- Portrait by Juan Patricio Morlete Ruiz

42nd Viceroy of New Spain
- In office 10 November 1755 – 5 February 1760
- Monarchs: Ferdinand VI; Charles III
- First Secretary of State: Ricardo Wall
- Secretary of State for the Indies: Julián de Arriaga y Ribera
- Preceded by: The Count of Revillagigedo
- Succeeded by: Francisco Cajigal de la Vega

Personal details
- Born: 18 September 1700 Ronda, Andalusia, Spain
- Died: 5 February 1760 (aged 59) Mexico City, New Spain
- Spouse: Luisa María del Rosario de Ahumada y Vera

Agustín de Ahumada y Villalón, 2nd Marquess of Amarillas (18 September 1700 – 5 February 1760) was a Spanish military officer and Viceroy of New Spain from 1755 to 1760.

== Early life ==
Agustín de Ahumada was the son of Bartolomé Félix de Ahumada y Ahumada and of Luisa Gertrudis Fernández de Villalón y Narváez. He was named 1st Marqués de las Amarillas by the Spanish crown. He married Catalina de Vera y Leyva.

The Marqués de las Amarillas had a distinguished military career and gained renown in the wars in Italy, where he rose to the rank of lieutenant colonel in the Royal Guards. He was serving as governor of the city of Barcelona at the time of his appointment to the Viceroyalty of New Spain.

== As viceroy of New Spain ==
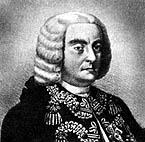
Agustín de Ahumada, Viceroy of New Spain

He entered Mexico City as viceroy on 10 November 1755. He celebrated the designation of the Virgin of Guadalupe as patron of New Spain (1756). He tried to suppress the irregularities of priests in Puebla (1756), where they were involved with the manufacture of aguardiente, gambling houses, and the selling of holy orders.

He intervened in the lawsuits involving the newly discovered deposits of silver in Nuevo León, trying to get the parties to settle. He tried to pacify the Indians of Coahuila, in conjunction with Governor Miguel Sesma. He continued work on the drainage system in Mexico City.

He sent aid to the Philippines against non-Christians, and to Florida against the British. The French were also trying to establish posts on the coast of Texas, and the British still threatened Spanish shipping and coastal settlements in the Caribbean.

More than 1,000 Comanches rose in revolt in Texas, committing various depredations on non-Indian settlements. Viceroy Ahumada sent armed assistance to the presidio of San Sabás, near San Antonio de Béjar, when it was besieged by the rebels. The president and other Spanish defenders were killed, but the reinforcements put down the uprising.

In 1757 the army of New Spain consisted of 2,897 men organized into 15 corps consisting of 61 companies. The main forces were concentrated in Mexico City and Veracruz, with small groups of 7 to 100 soldiers at various places in the interior.

The most productive mines in the colony in this period were Bolaños, in Jalisco, and La Voladora, in Nuevo León. The latter had just entered production.

In 1759 the volcano Jorullo was born in Michoacán, on the hacienda of San Miguel del Jorullo, property of Andrés Pimentel. All the surrounding ranches and villages had to be abandoned. The viceroy worked to find other locations for the refugees, mostly Indians. He paid much of the expenses for this purpose from his own pocket.

== Death ==
On 10 August 1759 King Ferdinand VI died, after long illness due to his wife's death one year before; he was succeeded by Charles III. Viceroy Ahumada y Villalón died in office, in Mexico City, after a long illness. He was interred in the church of La Piedad. Because of his charitable expenditures, he left his family in poverty. The treasury paid their passage back to Spain.

He was succeeded by the Audiencia, presided over by Francisco de Echávarri, until the arrival of the next viceroy, Francisco Cajigal de la Vega, who was promoted from governor of Havana.

== Additional information ==
=== Sources ===
- Ahumada y Villalón, Agustín de. Enciclopedia de México (in Spanish). Vol. 1. Mexico City. 1988. ISBN 1-56409-016-7.
- García Purón, Manuel (1984). México y sus gobernantes (in Spanish). Vol. 1. Mexico City: Joaquín Porrua.
- León Mariscal, Beatriz Berndt (2005). "Discursos de poder en un nuevo dominio: el trayecto del Virrey Marqués de las Amarillas de Veracruz a Puebla, las fiestas de entrada y el ceremonial político" (PDF). Uso de Anticonceptivos Entre Mujeres Indígenas: Un Estudio de Caso del Sureste Veracruzano (in Spanish). 1. Mexico: Colegio de Michoacán. ISSN 0185-3929.
- Orozco Linares, Fernando (1985). Gobernantes de México (in Spanish). Mexico City: Panorama Editorial. ISBN 968-38-0260-5.
- Orozco Linares, Fernando (1988). Fechas Históricas de México (in Spanish). Mexico City: Panorama Editorial. ISBN 968-38-0046-7.
- "Geneall.net" (in Spanish). 2007.
