= Joaquín de Montserrat, 1st Marquess of Cruillas =

Mexican politician (1700–1771)

Joaquin Montserrat
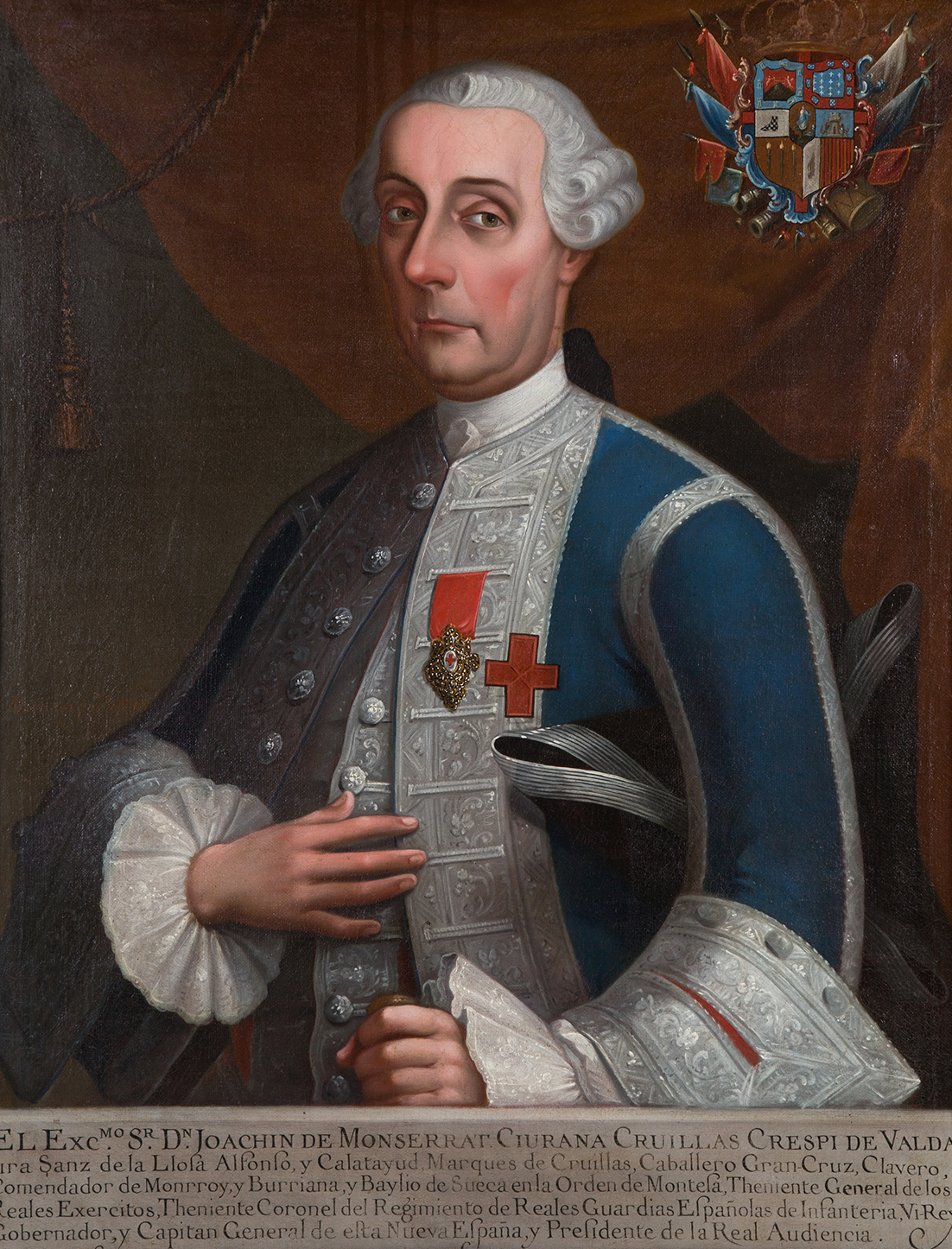

Viceroy of New Spain
- In office 6 October 1760 – 24 August, 1766
- Preceded by: Francisco Vega
- Succeeded by: Carlos Croix

Personal details
- Born: 26 June 1700 Valencia, Spain
- Died: 21 November 1771 (aged 71) Valencia, Spain

Joaquín de Montserrat, 1st Marquess of Cruillas (June 26, 1700 – November 21, 1771) was Spanish viceroy of New Spain, from October 6, 1760 to August 24, 1766.

== First years as viceroy ==
Joaquín de Montserrat was named viceroy of New Spain early in 1760. The transfer of power was made September 19, 1760 in Otumba, and his formal entry into Mexico City was October 6, 1760.

Among his immediate and most important concerns was the organization of a true colonial army. As he passed through Puebla, he reviewed a battalion of militia formed of Blacks and Mulattoes. Their arms were very irregular, and the new viceroy made a formal request to Spain for new rifles to arm them.

In 1761, there was an epidemic of smallpox that principally attacked the natives. Estimates were 14,600 dead in Mexico City and up to 80,000 in Puebla. The government nearly emptied its coffers (hardly full to begin with) to provide what palliative assistance was possible. Viceroy Montserrat took economy measures, ordered the collection of back taxes, and prohibited hoarding of foodstuffs and merchandise.

On November 20, 1761, Mayas under Jacinto Canek rose in rebellion in Cisteil, Yucatan. Canek was captured, and on December 14, 1761 he was tortured and quartered in the plaza of Valladolid.

Other disasters during Montserrat's term of office included a major flood in Guanajuato that paralyzed the operation of the silver mines (April, 1762), and another epidemic (of "fever") that caused many deaths (1763).

He also had to send military assistance to Sonora, where a revolt of Pimas and Seris had broken out against their maltreatment by the Spanish colonists. The rebels had killed the garrisons of two presidios and the governor before escaping to the mountains, where they were finally subdued.

== Seven Years' War ==
In January, 1762, after the accession of Charles III to the Spanish throne, Spain was again at war with the Kingdom of Great Britain. Havana was captured by the British on August 13, 1762, and Veracruz was perceived to be under the imminent threat of a British invasion. Montserrat strengthened the fortifications at Veracruz and made sure they were well supplied. He raised more troops and ensured that they were organized and trained to fight effectively. To guard the trade merchandise, he organized two companies of grenadiers, of Negroes and Mulattoes. The population dubbed these "Los Morenos" (the dark-skinned ones). The merchants of Veracruz formed another company and paid their salaries, arms and equipment. Other battalions and regiments were raised in the provinces, including battalions in Valladolid, León, Puebla and Oaxaca. Cavalry and militia were also raised in the large cities.

The Treaty of Paris, which ended the Seven Years' War, was signed in Paris on February 10, 1763. Spain received Louisiana and regained Havana and Manila from the British, but ceded Florida to Great Britain, as well as the right of settlement and timber-harvesting in modern-day Belize. In 1764, he organized the postal service, sent aid to Cuba, and continued work on the drainage system of Mexico City.

== Reorganization of the colonial army ==
This viceroy is considered the organizer of the first true professional army of New Spain. The soldiers were Mestizos, Blacks, and Mulattoes, but the high ranks were reserved for whites only. Natives were not accepted for military service. Because the army officials at the time of his arrival were volunteers of good family, but not trained in military service, the viceroy requested that Spain send military instructors. On November 1, 1765, Lt. Gen. Juan de Villalba arrived in Veracruz, with five other generals and various other officers, officials and men. These were the instructors for the new colonial army.

On September 30, 1765, José María Morelos, hero of Mexican independence, was born in Valladolid, Michoacan.

== Last years in office ==
Charles III had lost confidence in Montserrat because of a perceived decrease in the collection of royal rents. The Crown named José de Gálvez as visitador (inspector), with full powers to reform the administration and introduce new economic ideas. Gálvez, a minister of the Council of the Indies, arrived on August 2, 1765.

In 1766, Montserrat granted concessions to the miners of Guanajuato, who had rebelled. He also created new presidios in the north of the colony. Thereafter, disgusted with his loss of authority to the visitador, he resigned and returned to Spain.
