= José de Ibarra =

Mexican artist (1688–1756)

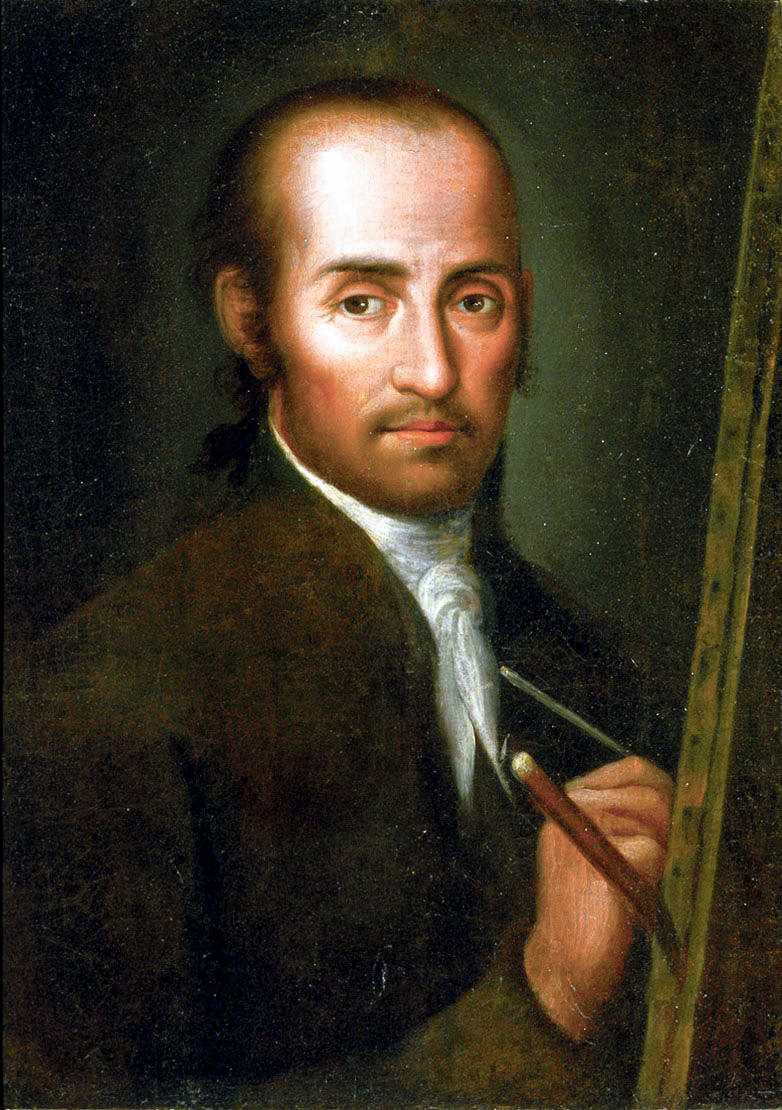
Portrait of José de Ibarra by Miguel Contreras.

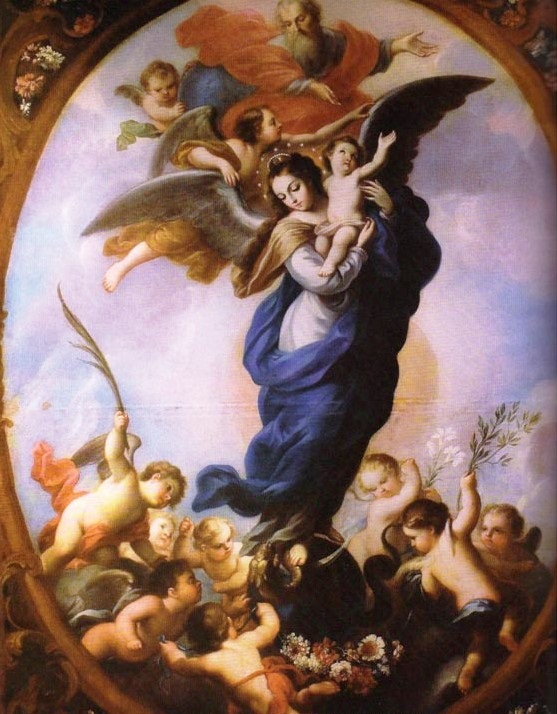
Inmaculada del Apocalipsis, Pinacoteca de La Profesa, México.

José de Ibarra (1688–1756) was a New Spanish painter. He was born in Guadalajara, Mexico in 1688, and died November 21, 1756, in Mexico City, in the Viceroyalty of New Spain (Colonial Mexico). Ibarra was a disciple of the distinguished painter Juan Correa (1646-1716), whose parents were of Afro-Moorish Afro-Mexican descent. José de Ibarra is, along with Juan Rodríguez Juárez (1675-1728), one of the most prominent figures in painting from the first half of the 18th century in New Spain, modern day's Mexico. A follower of the artistic renewal promoted by the brothers Juan and Nicolás Rodríguez Juárez, in whose workshop he collaborated, Ibarra cultivated in his work the language of pictorial modernism with strong Italian and French influences. This would be the direct antecedent of the work of Miguel Cabrera (1715-1768), whose fame would eclipse that of which Ibarra himself enjoyed among his contemporaries as a brush artist.

== Career ==
To a large extent the appreciation of his work has been hindered by the critical judgements of the historian Manuel Toussaint, who in his book, Colonial Painting in Mexico (published in 1965), pointed to Ibarra as one of those responsible for the supposed "decadence" of Mexican painting in the 18th century, promoted by the influence of Bartolomé Esteban Murillo(1617-1682). This opinion was based on the similarity that he saw between the works of the two painters, and on the fact that Ibarra was glowingly compared to the Sevillian painter by his friend, the poet and historian Cayetano de Cabrera y Quintero. In recent years, however, José de Ibarra's painting has begun to be revalued thanks to the contributions of researchers such as Rogelio Ruiz Gomar, Jaime Cuadriello, Ilona Katzew, Paula Mues and others. Together, they have highlighted the consistency and quality of his entire production, the originality of his contributions to the Novo-Hispanic pictorial tradition, and the importance of his contribution to the transformation of the arts that would lead to the founding of the Royal Academy of San Carlos of the Noble Arts. Qualities of his work that stand out include his loose and light brushwork, his characterized faces, a refined sense of composition and symmetry, his careful study of anatomy, and a spectacular search for tonal contrasts and a gradual reduction of his palette, all accentuated by the attitudes of the characters in his paintings.

Among his abundant production, it is necessary to highlight his portraits of the viceroys Pedro de Cebrián and Agustín, Count of Fuenclara, and Pedro de Castro Figueroa y Salazar, Duke of the Conquest, as well as the Archbishop of Mexico, Juan Antonio Vizarrón y Eguiarreta (National Museum of History, Mexico). These all act as examples of Ibarra's mastery in this pictorial genre. Likewise, he also completed the canvases of the "Relicario de San José", in the old Jesuit college of Tepotzotlán (today the National Museum of Viceroyalty), which represents the Flight to Egypt and The Patronage of San José. Finally, he completed a series of paintings for the Cathedral of Puebla, which include the four canvases of the "Adorations" on the outer walls of the choir and those of the Way of the Cross on the pilasters of the temple, the latter attributed for a long time to Miguel Cabrera.

Ibarra's career was marked with support of initiatives to protect the intellectual integrity of painting as an art form. He was influenced by contemporaries Cristóbal de Villalpando and Juan Rodríguez Juárez. His remains are interred at the Church of Santa Inés in Mexico City.

Many of Ibarra's works are preserved in Mexican museums and the Metropolitan Cathedral in Mexico City and in the Museo de América in Madrid. He was one of the most prolific painters of his day, producing mainly religious paintings for the cathedrals of Mexico.

== Gallery ==
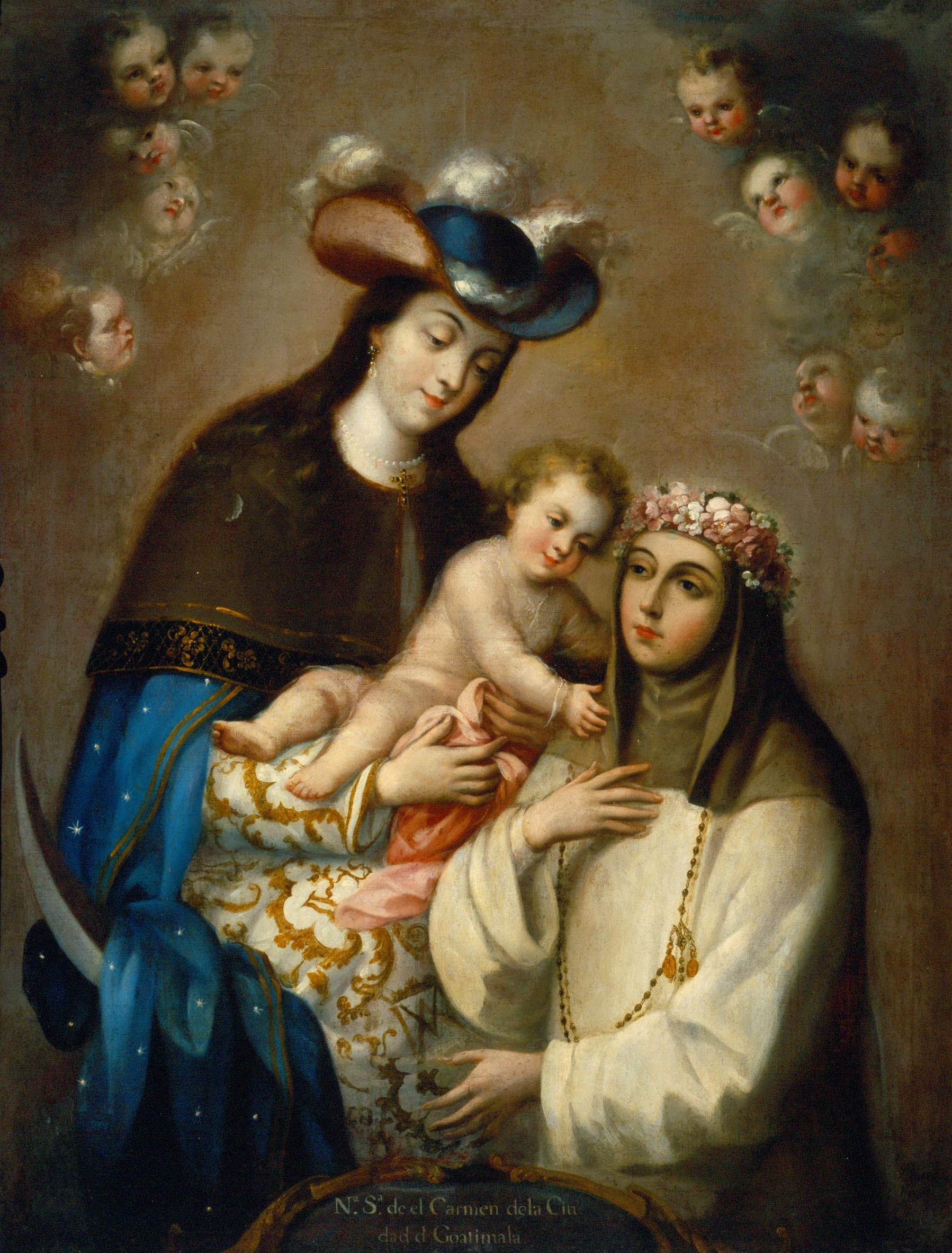
Our Lady of Mount Carmel of Guatemala

== See also ==
- Mexican art
