= Count of Revilla Gigedo =

Spanish noble title

Countship of Revilla Gigedo
- Coat of Arms as Grandee of Spain
- Creation date: 11 September 1749
- Created by: King Ferdinand VI of Spain
- First holder: Juan Francisco de Güemes
- Present holder: Álvaro María de Armada
- Remainder to: Heirs of the body of the grantee
- Status: Extant

== List of Holders ==
- Don Juan Francisco de Güemes, 1st Count of Revillagigedo (1681–1766), was the Viceroy of New Spain from 1746 to 1755.
- His son, Don Juan Vicente de Güemes Padilla Horcasitas y Aguayo, 2nd Count of Revillagigedo, (1738–1799), born in Havana, Cuba, was Viceroy of New Spain from 1789 to 1794.
- Antonio María de Güemes y Pacheco de Padilla, 3rd Count
- Carlota Luisa de Güemes y Muñoz de Loaisa, 4th Countess
- María Manuela de la Paciencia Fernández de Córdoba y de Güemes, 5th Countess
- Álvaro de Armada y Fernández de Córdoba, 6th Count
- Álvaro de Armada y de los Ríos-Enríquez, 7th Count
- Álvaro María del Milagro de Armada y Ulloa, 8th Count
- Álvaro María de Armada y Barcáiztegui, 9th Count
