= Juan Correa =

Mexican painter (1646–1739)

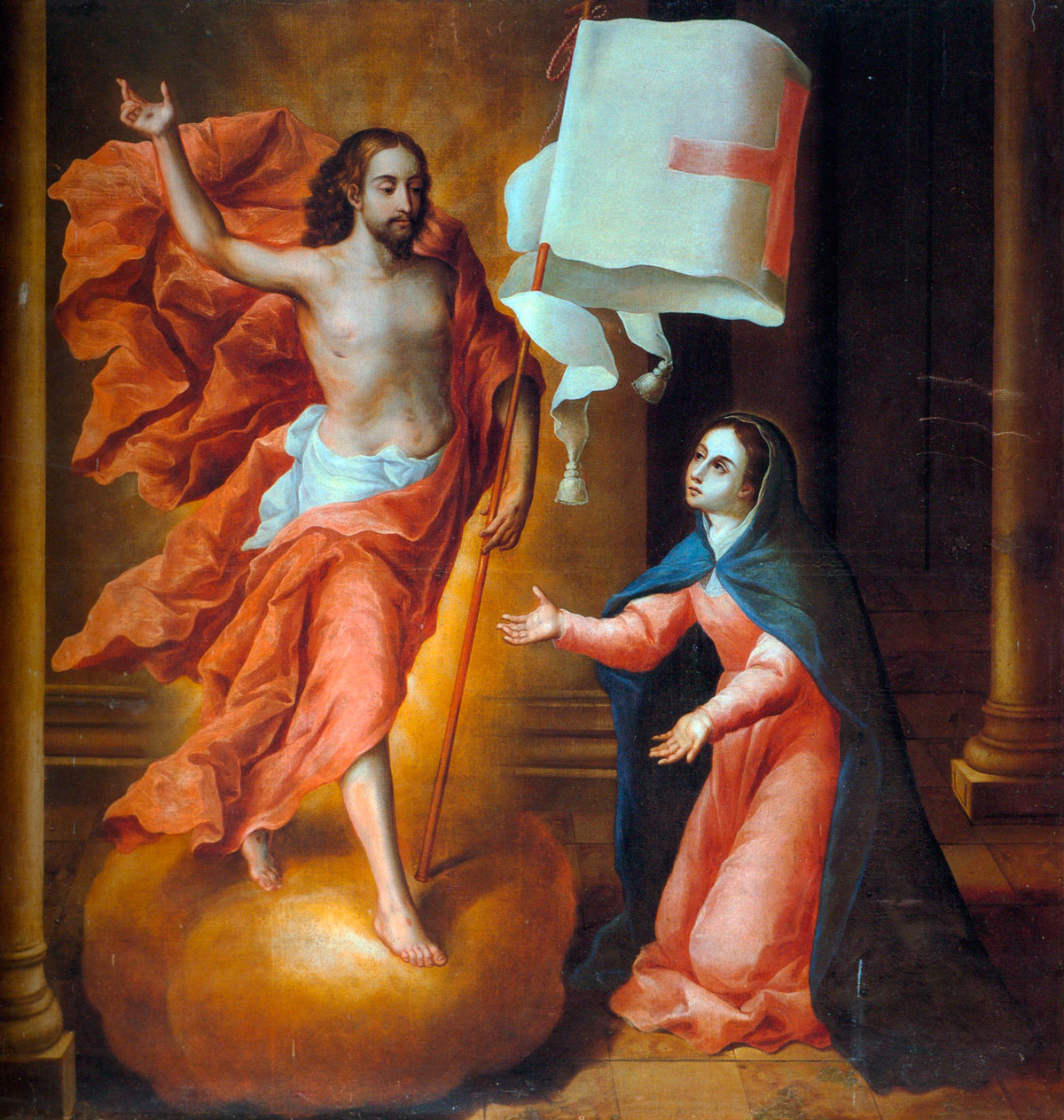
La Pascua de Maria, 1698.

Juan Correa (1646–1716) was a distinguished Mexican painter of the late seventeenth and early eighteenth centuries. His years of greatest activity were from 1671 to 1716.

== Career ==
Correa was the Afro-Mexican son of a mulatto (or dark-skinned) physician from Cádiz, Spain, and a freed black woman, Pascuala de Santoyo. Correa "became one of the most prominent artists in New Spain during his lifetime, along with Cristóbal de Villalpando."

Correa was a highly productive religious painter, with two major paintings in the sacristy of the Cathedral of Mexico City, one on the subject of the Assumption and Coronation of the Virgin (each from 1689), and the Entry into Jerusalem (1691). Elsewhere in the cathedral he created the Vision of the Apocalypse, and other versions of the Assumption and Coronation of the Virgin. His two canvases for the sacristy are regarded as masterpieces of Mexican baroque. Correa also painted major works for the Jesuit church in Tepozotlan, Mexico (now the Museum of the Viceroyalty), the Chapel of the Rosary in the convent of Azcapotzalco (in Mexico City) and—based on models by ——for the cathedral of Durango. His last known work from the early 18th century was documented at Antigua, Guatemala, in 1739.

Correa was the teacher of José de Ibarra and Juan Rodríguez Juarez. His brother, José Correa, his nephews Miguel Correa and Diego Correa, and his grandsons (also named Miguel and Diego) worked as painters.

== Style ==
It is estimated that Correa produced around 500 paintings for churches and private patrons during the course of his life. His themes are mainly catholic. His early style was described by Ilona Katzew (LACMA curator) as having a "vibrant palette, elegant composition, and overall emphasis on decorative details [, and] subtle color gradations that provide a sense of iridescence and contribute to the overall mystical effect." It is often unclear if a painting should be attributed to Juan Correa alone, or to his family atelier. According to Kathryn Santner (Denver Art Museum curator), "the immense success of the Correa family demonstrates that (contrary to previously held assumptions) Afrodescendant artists were indeed able to function in colonial Mexico as prominent artists within the guild system.

Manuel Toussaint considers Correa and Villalpando the main exponents of the Baroque style of painting in Mexico. According to Toussaint, Correa was "important in achieving a new quality, in the creative impulse he expresses, and which one cannot doubt embodies the eagerness of New Spain for an art of its own, breaking away from its Spanish lineage. Here New Spain attains its own personality, unique and unmistakable." James Oles writes that "Correa and Villalpando created a distinctive—if at times formulaic—style that hearkened back to the strong Mannerist traditions of the mid-sixteenth century."

== Collections ==
Allegory of the Holy Sacrament and The Guardian Angel are on exhibit at the Denver Art Museum. In 2013, the Los Angeles County Museum of Art (LACMA) acquired its first Correa, Angel Carrying a Cypress ('Ángel portando un ciprés') painted circa 1670–90. The painting is on exhibit in the Latin American gallery of the Americas Building. Additionally, Agonía de San Francisco Javier, (c. late 17th century - early 18th) is part of the collection at the Gilcrease Museum in Tulsa, Oklahoma.

== Gallery ==
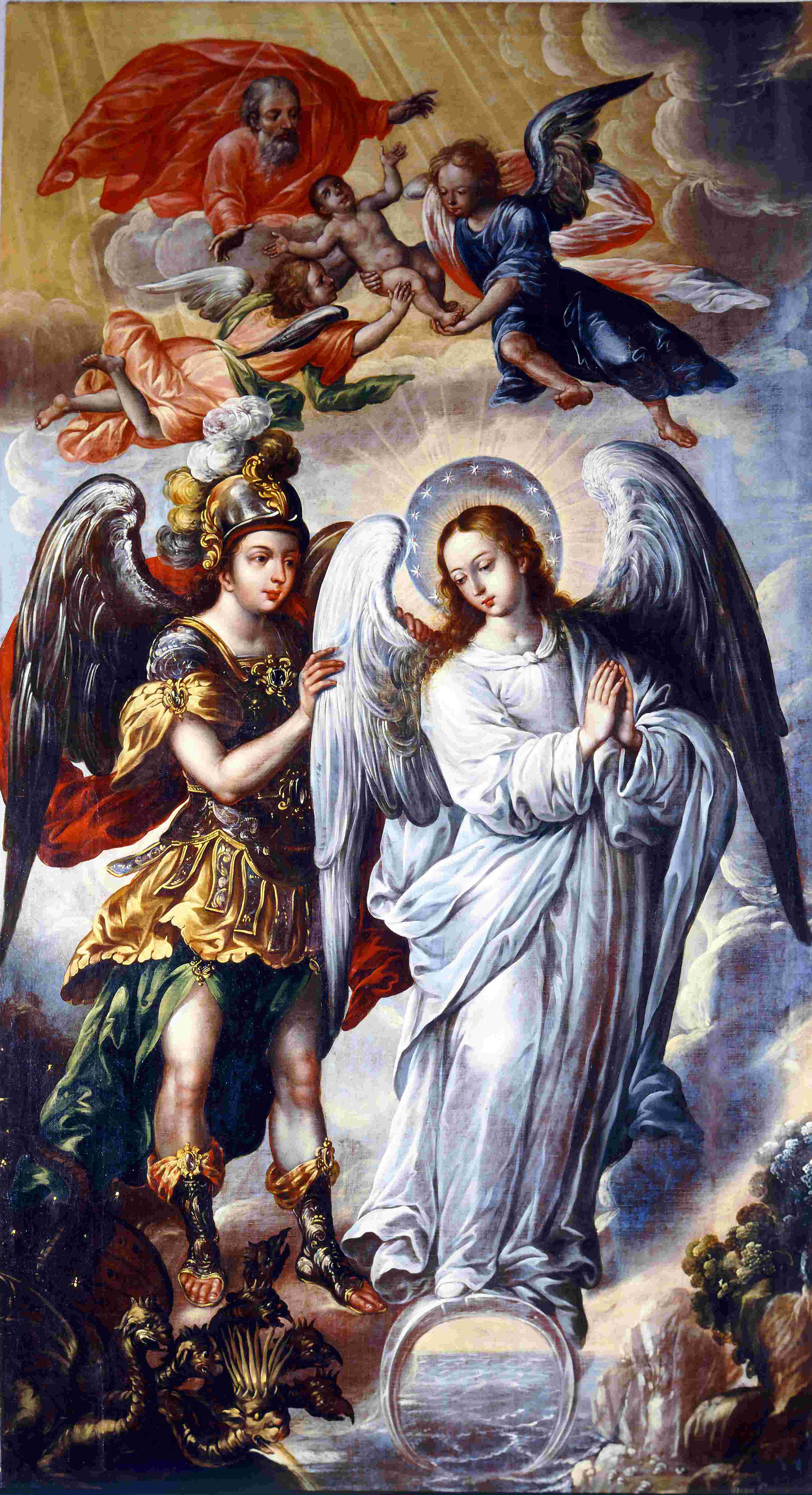
The Virgin of the Apocalypse, Museo Nacional del Virreinato, Tepotzotlán

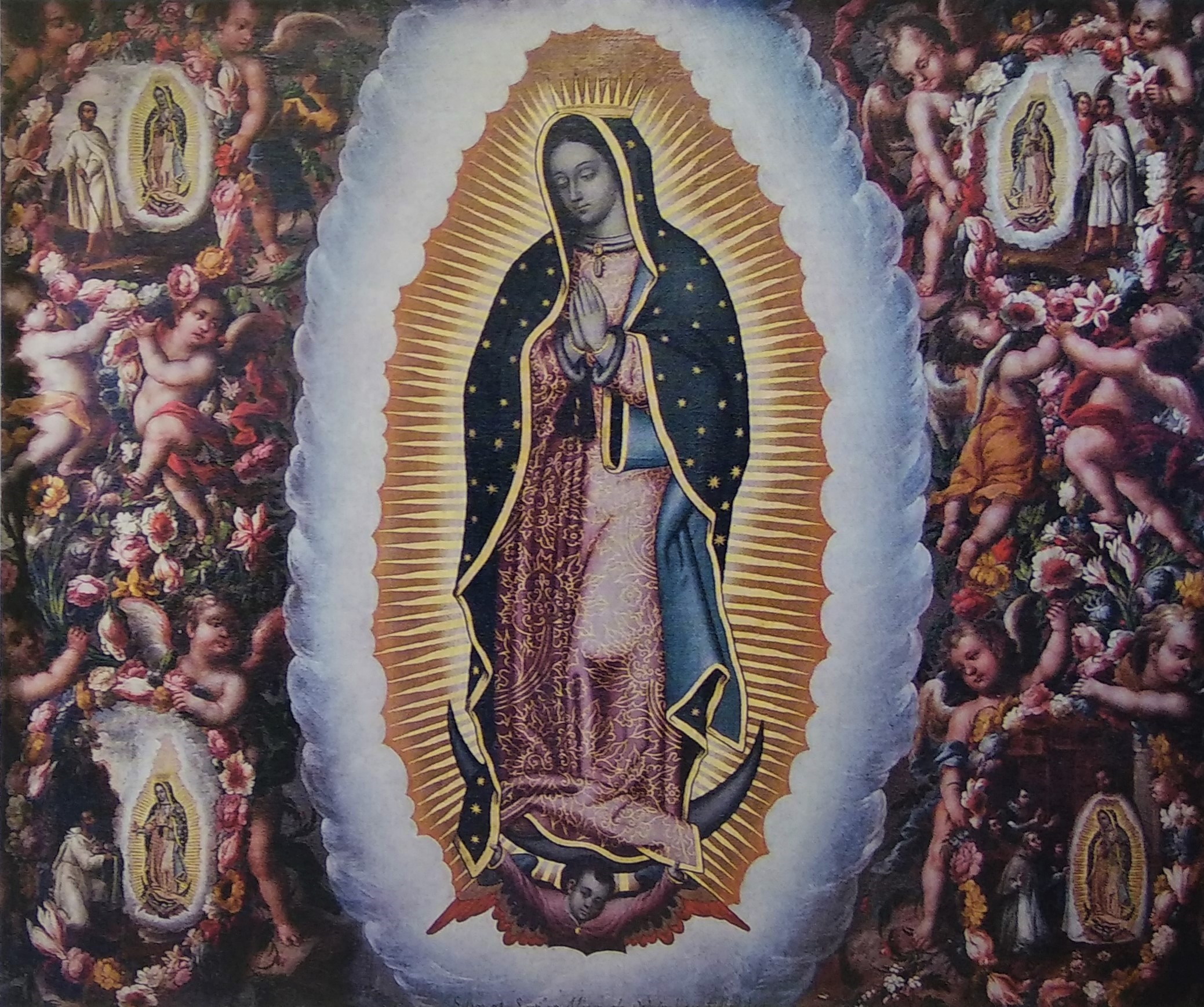
Virgin of Guadalupe, San Nicolás de Bari Church, Seville, Spain

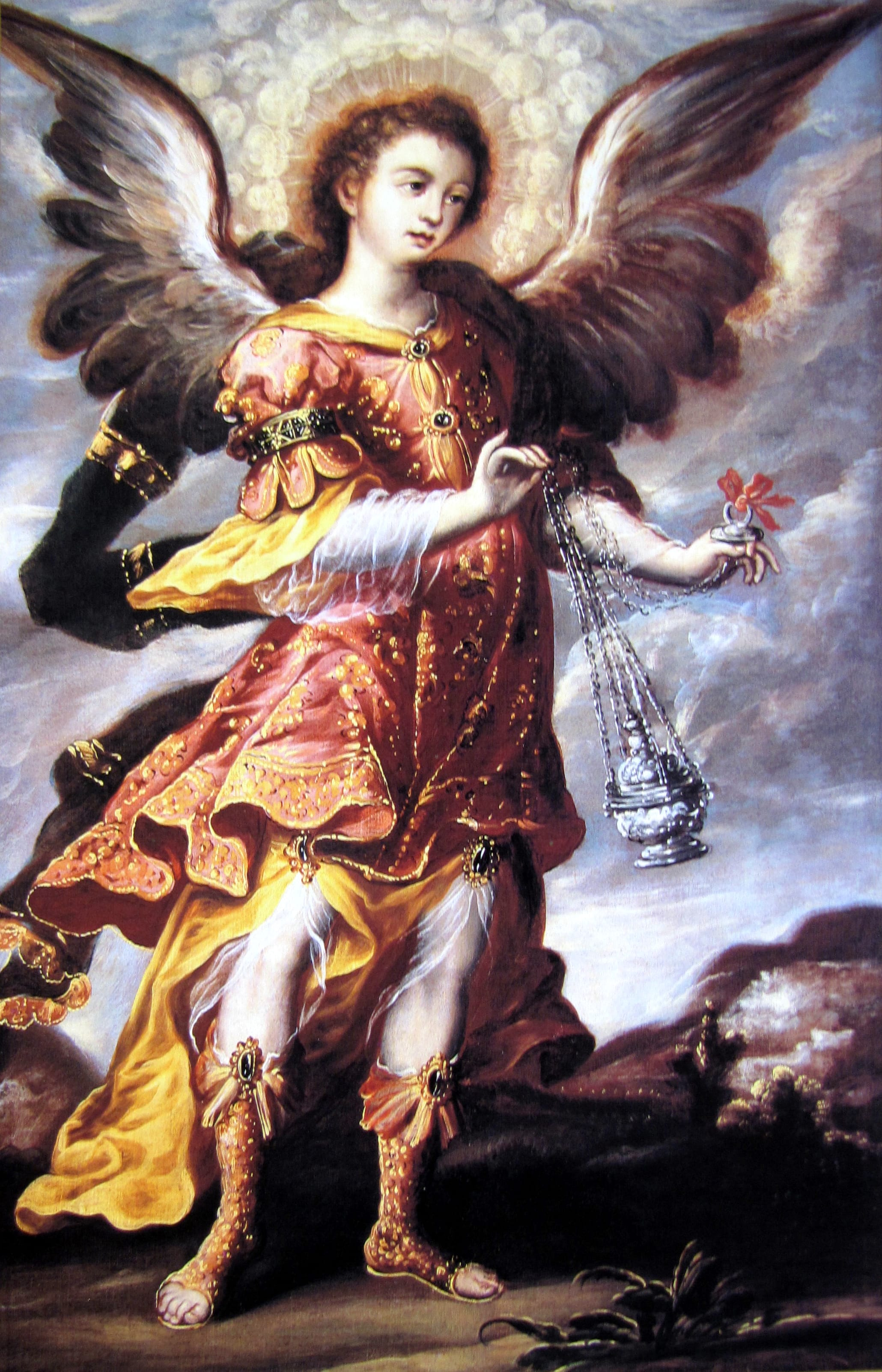
Arcángel Sealtiel ("Intercessor of God"), Colección Banamex, Palacio de los Condes de San Mateo de Valparaiso, México City, Mexico

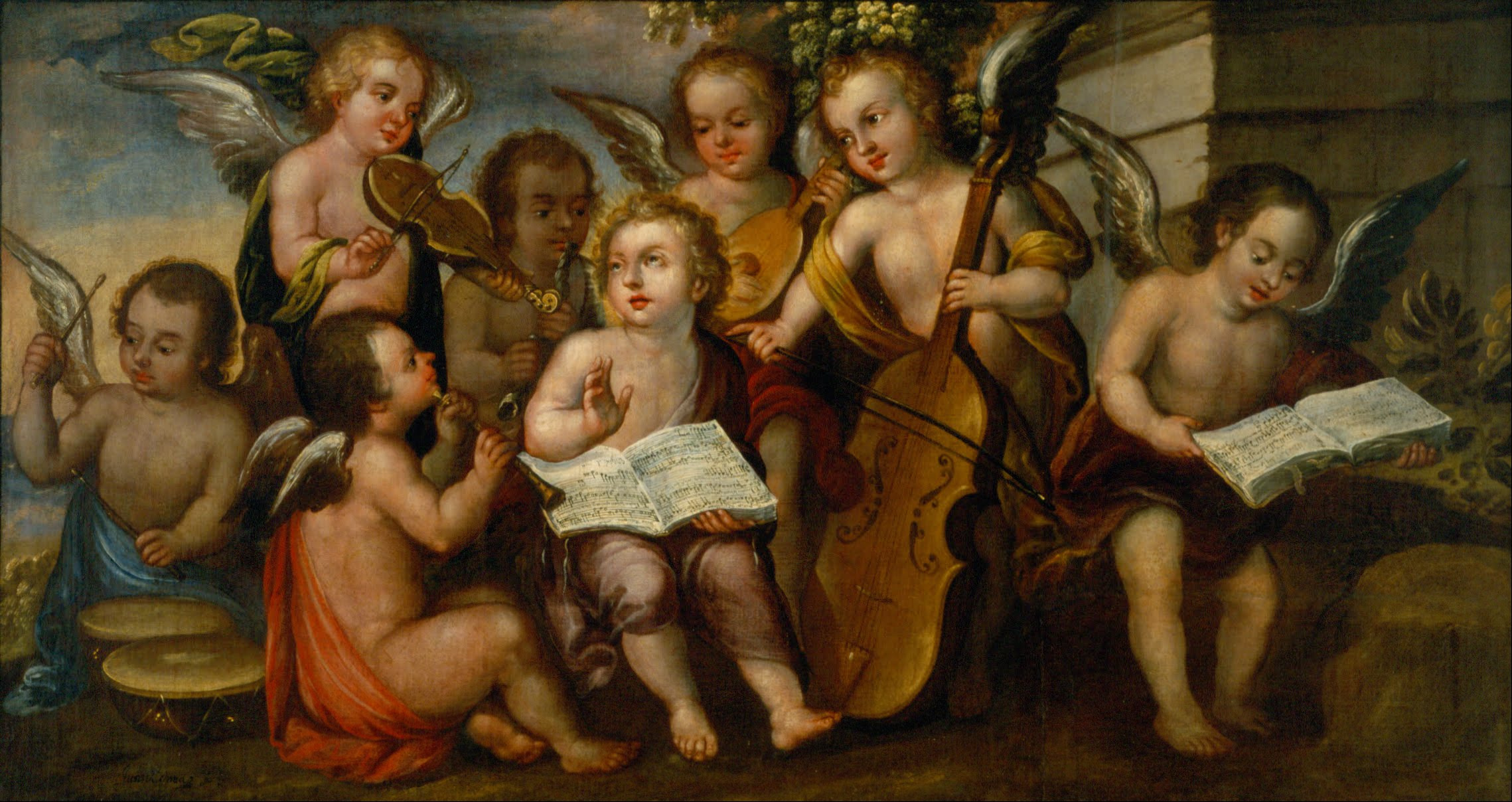
El Niño Jesús con ángeles músicos, Museo Nacional de Arte, Ciudad de México

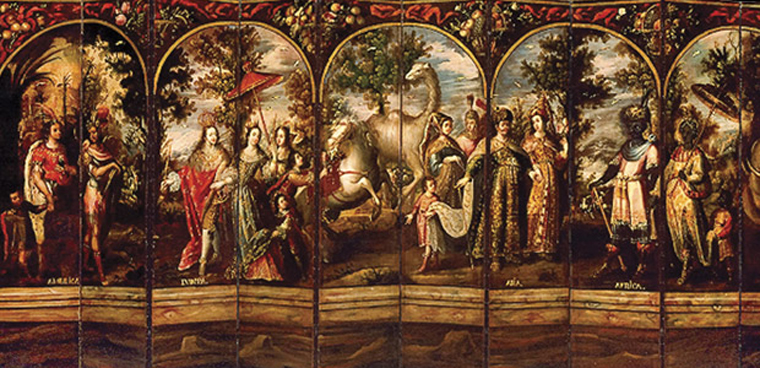
The Four Parts of the World (Las Cuatro Partes del Mundo); Late 17th century; Medium: Oil painting on panel.

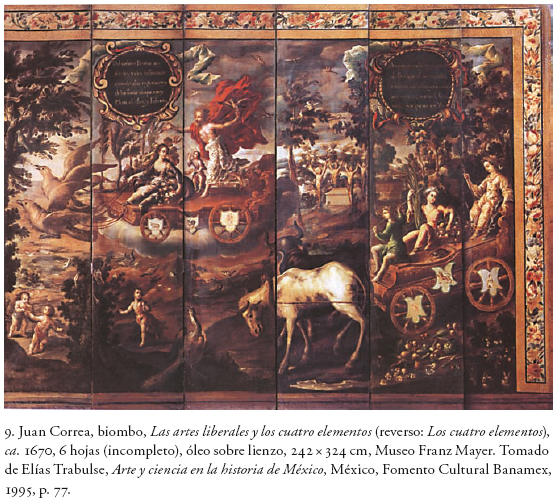
The Liberal Arts (Las Artes Liberales). 6 sheets Byōbu, oil on canvas, 242 x 324, Franz Mayer Museum.

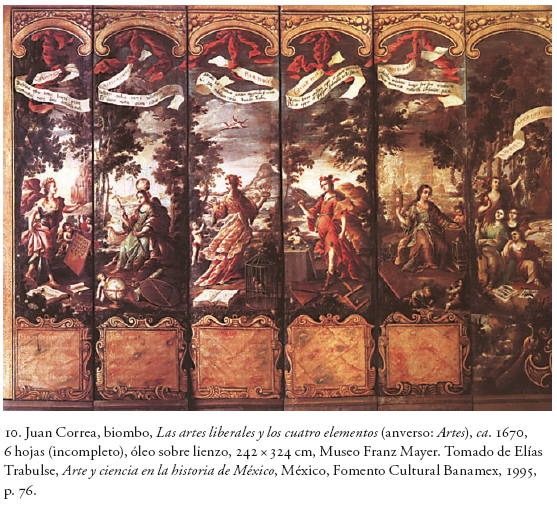
The Four Elements (Los Cuatro Elementos). 6 sheets Byōbu, oil on canvas, 242 x 324, Franz Mayer Museum.

== See also ==
- Afro-Mexicans
- Castas
- Mexican art
