= José Antonio Villaseñor y Sánchez =

18th-century geographer, historian, and mathematician in New Spain

José Antonio Villaseñor y Sánchez was an 18th-century geographer, historian, and mathematician in New Spain. He was born in San Luis Potosí, Mexico and studied at San Ildefonso in Mexico City. He became an accountant, and later official cosmographer (geographer) of New Spain.

Following royal instructions, Viceroy Pedro Cebrián, 3rd Count of Fuenclara ordered him to prepare an official estimate of the population of New Spain, to be transmitted to the Court. The estimate was completed in April 1744, and the population was found to be 3,865,000. He also produced a plan of Mexico City (1750).

== Works ==
- Pantómetra matemática combinatoria de las leyes de la plata de toda ley (1733).
- Theatro Americano, descripción general de los reinos y provincias de la Nueva España y sus jurisdicciones (2 vols., 1746–48; 2nd ed. 1952). This work is a valuable source for colonial historians.
- Matemático cómputo de los astros (1756).
