= Luceni =

- municipality
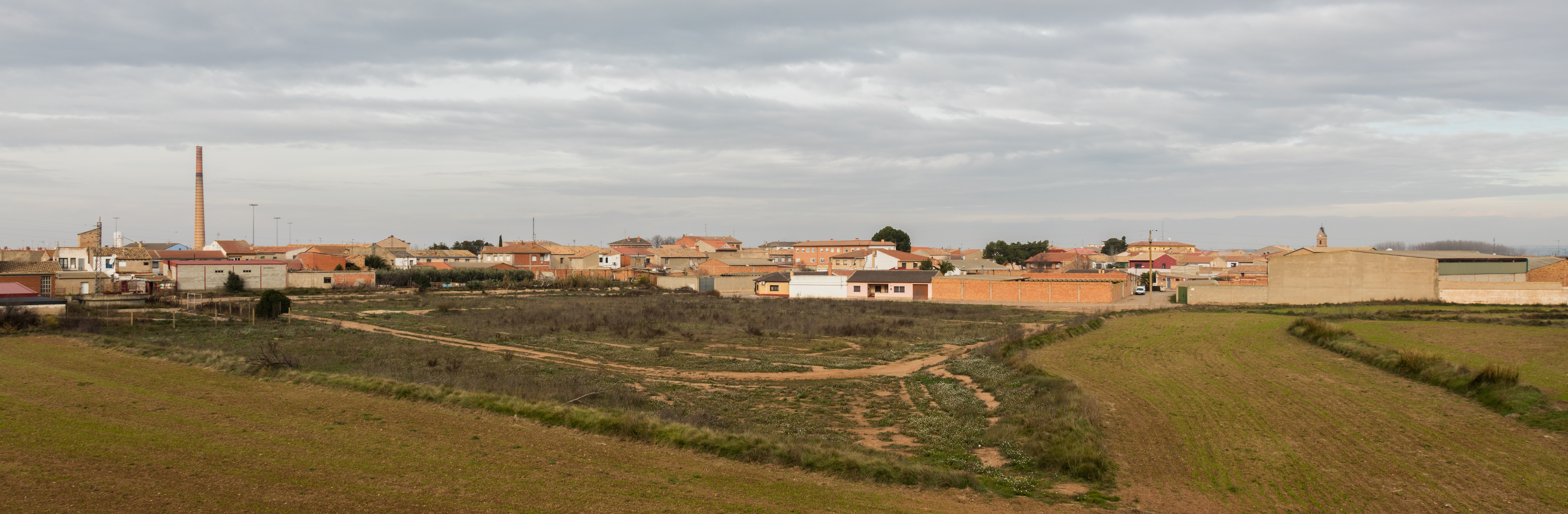

- Coat of arms

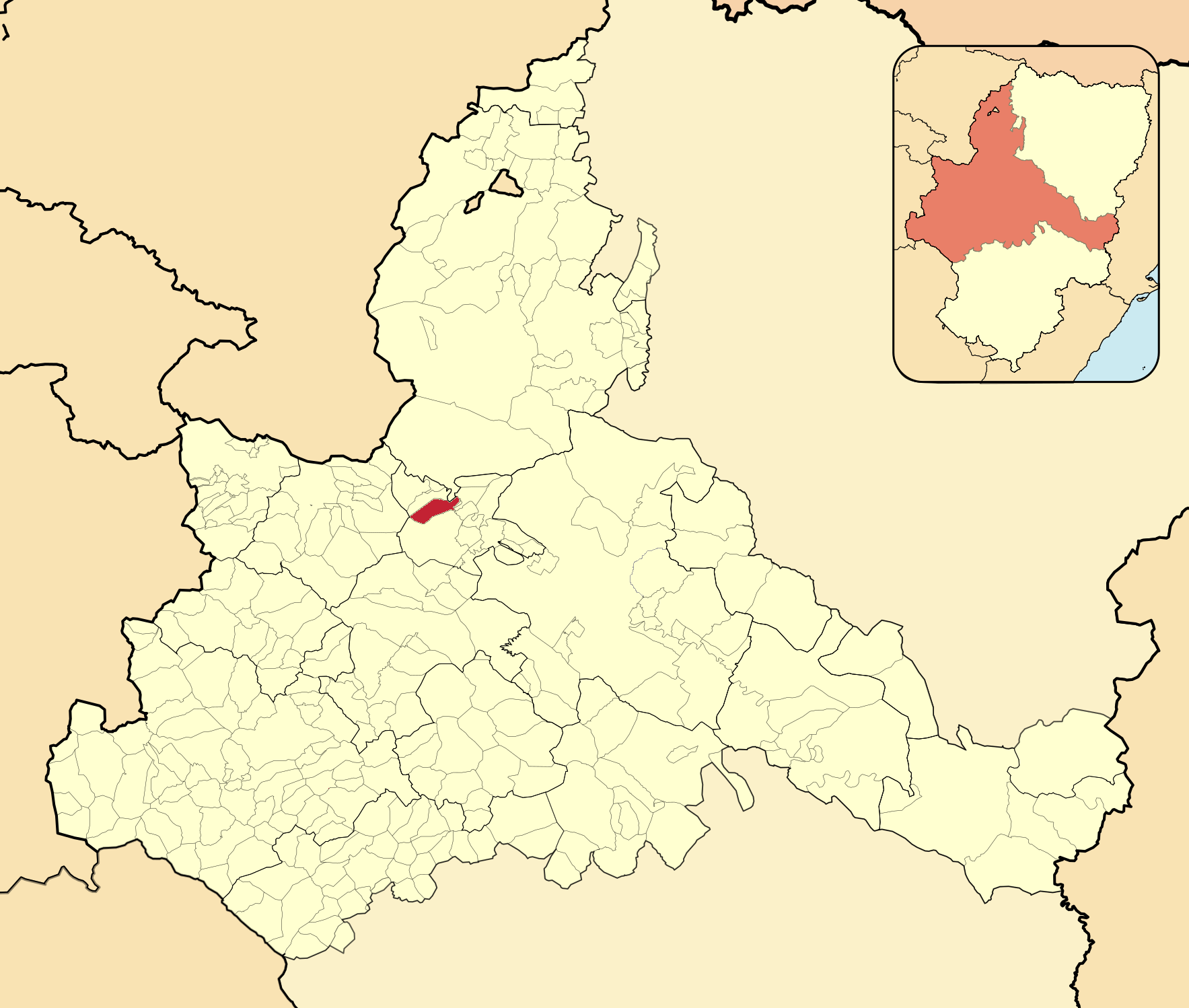
- Location of Luceni within the province of Zaragoza

- Location within Aragon Location within Spain Location within Europe
- Coordinates: 41°50′N 1°14′W
- Country: Spain
- Autonomous community: Aragon
- Province: Zaragoza

Area
  - Total: 27 km^{2} (10 sq mi)

Population (2025-01-01)
  - Total: 1,003
  - Density: 37/km^{2} (96/sq mi)
- Time zone: UTC+1 (CET)
  - Summer (DST): UTC+2 (CEST)

Luceni is a municipality located in the province of Zaragoza, Aragon, Spain. According to the 2004 census (INE), the municipality has a population of 1,048 inhabitants.

== See also ==
- List of municipalities in Zaragoza
