= Juan Vicente de Güemes, 2nd Count of Revillagigedo =

Spanish general and viceroy of New Spain (1738–1799)

The Most Excellent The Count of Revillagigedo
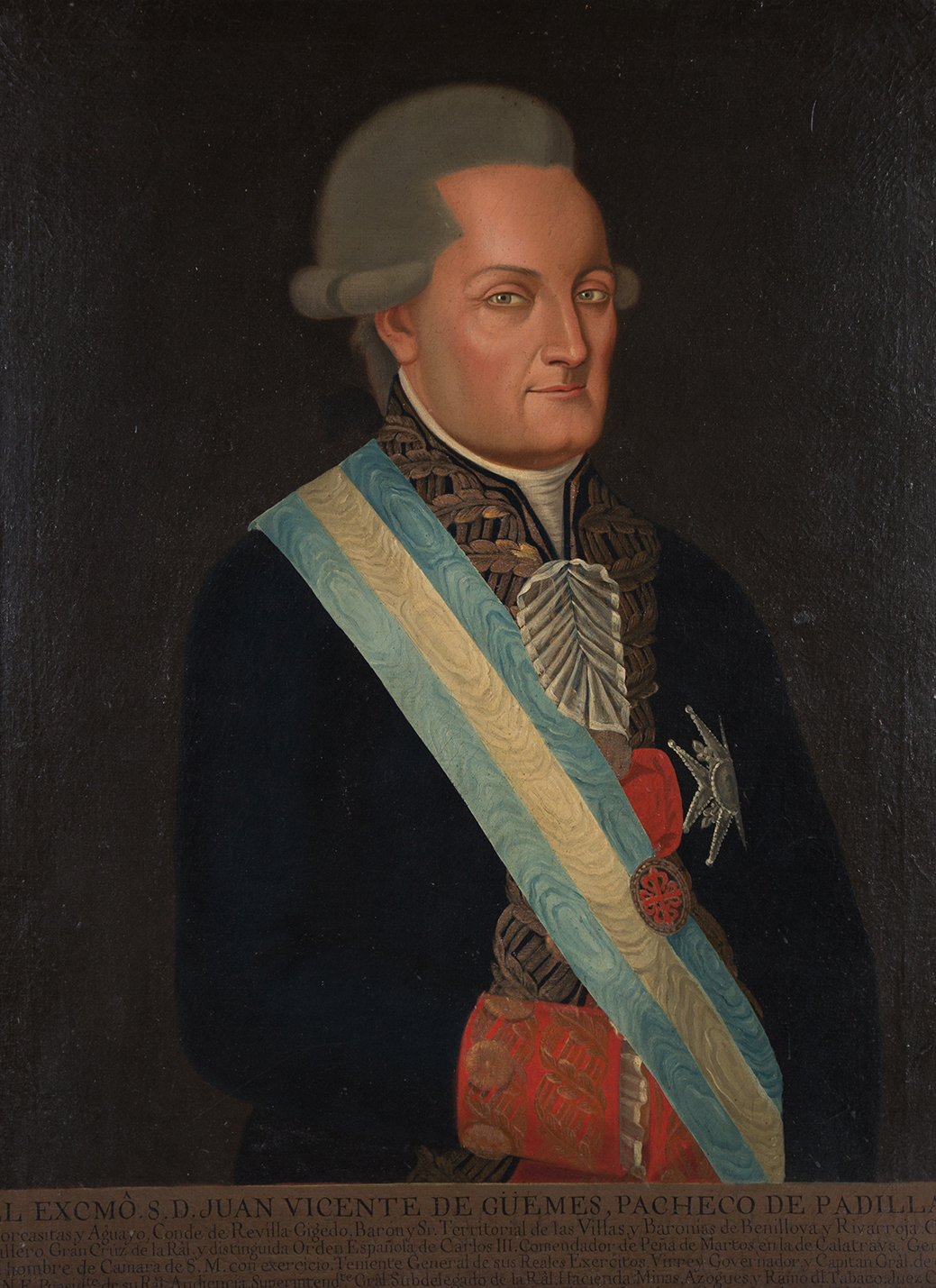

52nd Viceroy of New Spain
- In office 17 October 1789 – 11 July 1794
- Monarch: Charles IV
- Preceded by: Manuel Antonio Flórez
- Succeeded by: Miguel de la Grúa Talamanca, 1st Marquis of Branciforte

Personal details
- Born: Juan Vicente de Güemes Padilla Horcasitas y Aguayo; 5 April 1738 Havana, Cuba
- Died: 2 May 1799 (aged 61) Madrid, Spain
- Parents: Juan Francisco de Güemes (father); Antonia Ceferina Pacheco de Padilla y Aguayo (mother)

Juan Vicente de Güemes Padilla Horcasitas y Aguayo, 2nd Count of Revillagigedo (Spanish, with variant name: Juan Vicente de Güemes Pacheco de Padilla y Horcasitas, segundo conde de Revillagigedo) (5 April 1738 in Havana – 2 May 1799 in Madrid) was a Spanish military officer and viceroy of New Spain from 17 October 1789 to 11 July 1794. In his role as colonial administrator, he is known as a reformer.

== Youth and military career ==
From a young age, Güemes Padilla Horcasitas served in the army, and distinguished himself participating in the Spanish siege of British Gibraltar. He rose to the rank of lieutenant colonel. He was a knight of the military Order of Charles III, baron of Benilova y Rivarroja and lord of the bedchamber to his majesty.

== First days as viceroy ==
He arrived at Veracruz on 8 October 1789 and took up the offices of viceroy, captain general and president of the Audiencia on the seventeenth. He became the third Criollo viceroy. His father, Juan Francisco de Güemes y Horcasitas, 1st Count of Revillagigedo was captain general of the island of Cuba, where the son was born, and later viceroy of New Spain (1746–55). The son was said to sleep only three to four hours a night, arising at 1 a.m. to begin a day's work.

Within a week of Güemes Padilla taking office, a gang of outlaws murdered Joaquín Dongo, a merchant and principal citizen of the capital, and ten of his employees. Güemes Padilla took only 13 days to have the gang located, tried and executed for the murders. Blanco, Aldama and Quintero, all Spaniards, were garroted for the murders on 7 November on a scaffold in the Plaza de Mexico. For this, he was often called the Vindicator of Justice.

Two other prominent murders occurred during his term. The first was that of the prefect of the monastery of Merced, killed by a priest of his order 23 September 1790. The other was the murder on 25 June 1792 of Lucas de Gálvez, governor and captain general of Yucatán.

== The challenges of his administration ==
He found the capital run down and dirty—the streets, the markets, the promenades. Most of the people appeared in public wearing nothing but thin robes and battered straw hats. Houses were badly made and badly cared for. Public education had deteriorated. There were no free primary schools and other public schools were deficient. Most streets had not been maintained, and were fit for travel only by foot or by mule. The state of the army was shocking.

== His reforms ==
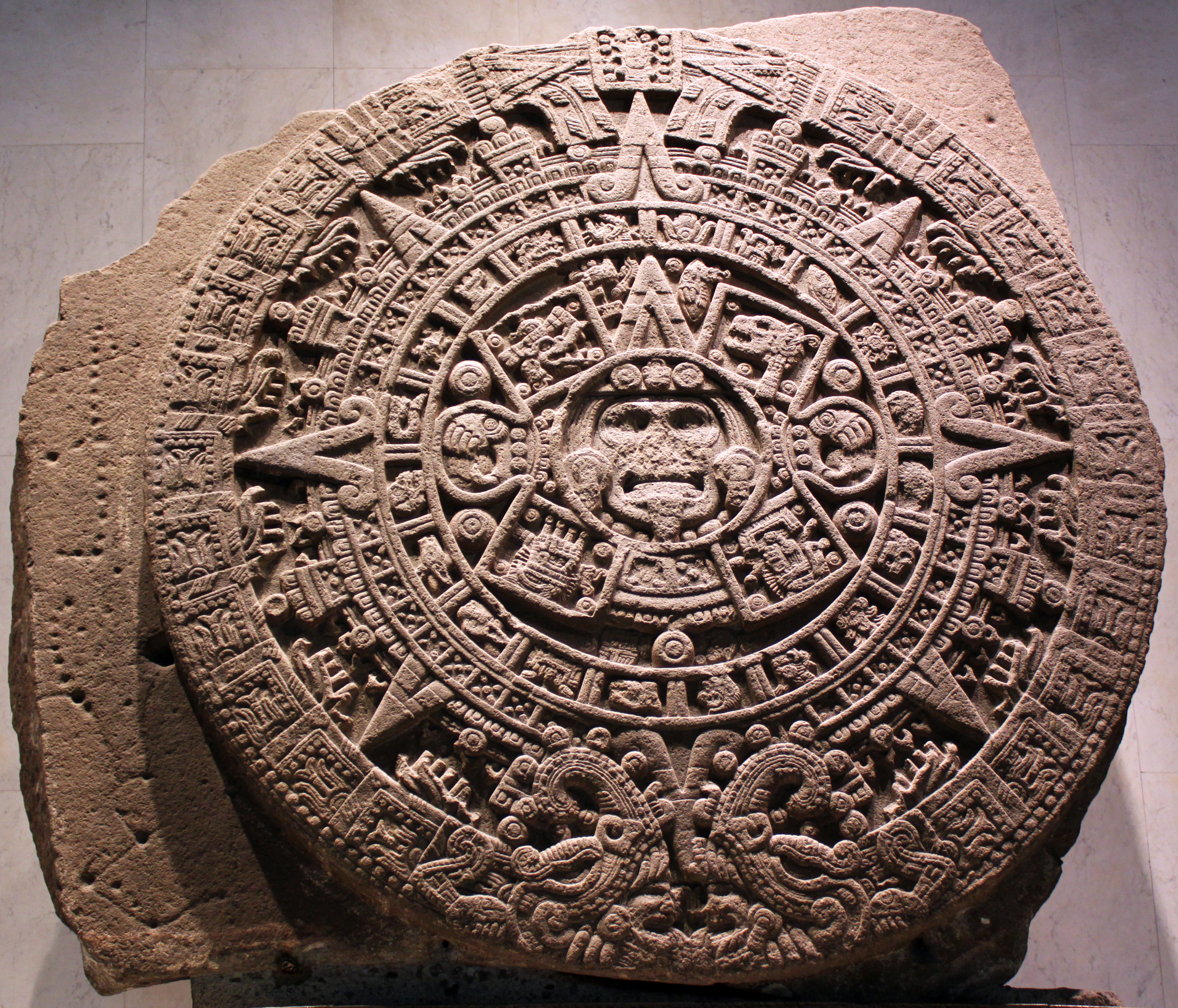
Aztec calendar stone discovered in 1790 and now at the National Anthropology Museum in Mexico City.

He immediately ordered the cleaning of the viceroy's palace, banishing the food-sellers' stalls. He prohibited the population from throwing trash in the streets. He removed stray animals from the streets. He ordered that no building be constructed without a license from the authorities. He continued the cobblestone paving of the streets outside of the city center.

He did much to lessen the bribery and corruption among government employees. He implemented a new administrative system of intendancies in the government (begun by a previous viceroy, Alonso Núñez de Haro y Peralta). He reorganized the courts and founded schools for Indigenous in various cities. He hired competent teachers for the Academy of San Carlos, and founded a chair in mathematics. He also set up a chair in anatomy at the General Hospital of the Natives.

He ordered plans be created for the principal cities, stimulated the establishment of factories, and continued the work on the drainage system of Mexico City. He stimulated the cultivation of plants for textiles—cotton, hemp, flax and mulberry—and regulated the cutting of wood.

Güemes Padilla cleaned up Mexico City and continued to install street lights there and in various other cities. All of the principal streets of Mexico City were lighted by the end of his term. He intensified the construction of highways to Veracruz, Acapulco, Guadalajara, San Blas and Toluca and established biweekly mail service to the capitals of the intendencies. He promoted the construction of needed public buildings and aqueducts. He instituted night patrols and fire brigades. He also established the general archives of the colony, bring together old and important documents. He ordered that cemeteries be outside the city. He had new ships built for the protection of the coasts.

As a reaction to the French Revolution, he prohibited the importation of books and periodicals expressing the new ideas. Spain's war with France was very expensive, and Güemes Padilla sent three million pesos to the mother country, in addition to the usual remittances.

He initiated excavations in the Plaza de Armas in Mexico City, during which the Aztec sun stone was discovered (1790). (This was part of a project to level the streets.) In 1792 he founded the Royal College of Mining. He aided the botanical investigations of Martín Sessé y Lacasta, which were to result in the Flora mexicana (1894). He ordered that a census be taken of the colony. There were 4,484,000 inhabitants.

== Explorations ==
Alessandro Malaspina, commander of the corvettes Descubierta and Atrevida, arrived in Mexico in 1791 during his scientific and political voyage throughout the Spanish colonies. Malaspina assigned several of his officers to investigate the colonial archives and records. This was one of the political tasks of the Malaspina expedition, for which Malaspina and his officers had royal authority above that of the viceroy, authorizing access to any and all documents they might think relevant. Dionisio Alcalá Galiano was in command of the party of Malaspina's officers. While in Mexico Malaspina received orders from the king of Spain to investigate a rumored Northwest Passage in Alaska. While returning to Acapulco Malaspina learned of the discovery of the entrance to the Strait of Georgia, a result of the expedition of Francisco de Eliza sent by Güemes Padilla in 1791 to the Pacific Northwest. Güemes Padilla had been preparing another expedition to explore the Strait of Juan de Fuca since 1791. It was to be under the command of Francisco Antonio Mourelle, using two newly built schooners, Mexicana and Sutil. But Malaspina was able to take control of the schooners, replaced Mourelle with Alcalá Galiano, and sent the ships to explore the Strait of Georgia. Galiano's expedition took place in 1792. Because Malaspina was imprisoned for political reasons upon his return to Spain in 1794 the account of his expedition was never published. Galiano's exploration account was published in 1802, but with all mention of Malaspina removed. It was instead said that Galiano operated under the direction of Güemes Padilla instead of Malaspina. This fiction continues to be widely cited to the present day.

Because of his sponsorship of exploration, several places in North America bear his name, such as San Juan Island, Orcas Island, Revillagigedo Island, Padilla Bay, and Guemes Island, among others. When he took the office of viceroy in 1789, the Spanish claims in North America had reached their widest extent. Although he sponsored exploration, he did not see the Pacific Northwest as being worth what it would cost to maintain possession of it and he resisted his predecessor's efforts to build up the army there.

== End of his administration ==
In 1794 complaints from the Ayuntamiento (city government) led to a juicio de residencia against the viceroy before the Council of the Indies. (He had made enemies by his fight against corruption.) The viceroy was ordered to return to Spain to mount a defense against the various charges. He was absolved and the councilmen were ordered to pay costs.

Despite his good work and popularity with the people he ruled, Güemes Padilla lasted only five years in office. Although King Charles IV was the nominal ruler of Spain, his queen, Maria Louisa of Parma, and her lover, Manuel de Godoy, held most of the power. Godoy was not in agreement with Güemes Padilla's reforms and lack of territorial ambitions in the Pacific Northwest. Godoy replaced him as soon as he could.

== Death and legacy ==
Revillagigedo Island, in the Alexander Archipelago of southeast Alaska was named for him, as were the San Juan Islands in what is now the United States state of Washington and the Revillagigedo Islands, southwest of the Baja California peninsula in Mexico. There is also a Palacio de Revillagigedo in Gijón, Spain.

He died on 2 May 1799 (some sources say 12 May) in Madrid. He was greatly mourned in New Spain. In his honor, Charles IV made his descendants grandees of Spain.

== Notes ==
Government offices
Preceded by Manuel Antonio Flores	Viceroy of New Spain; 1789–1794	Succeeded by The Marquis of Branciforte
Spanish nobility
Preceded by Juan Francisco de Güemes	Count of Revillagigedo; 1766–1799	Succeeded by Antonio de Güemes
