= Pedro Malo de Villavicencio =

Viceroy of New Spain

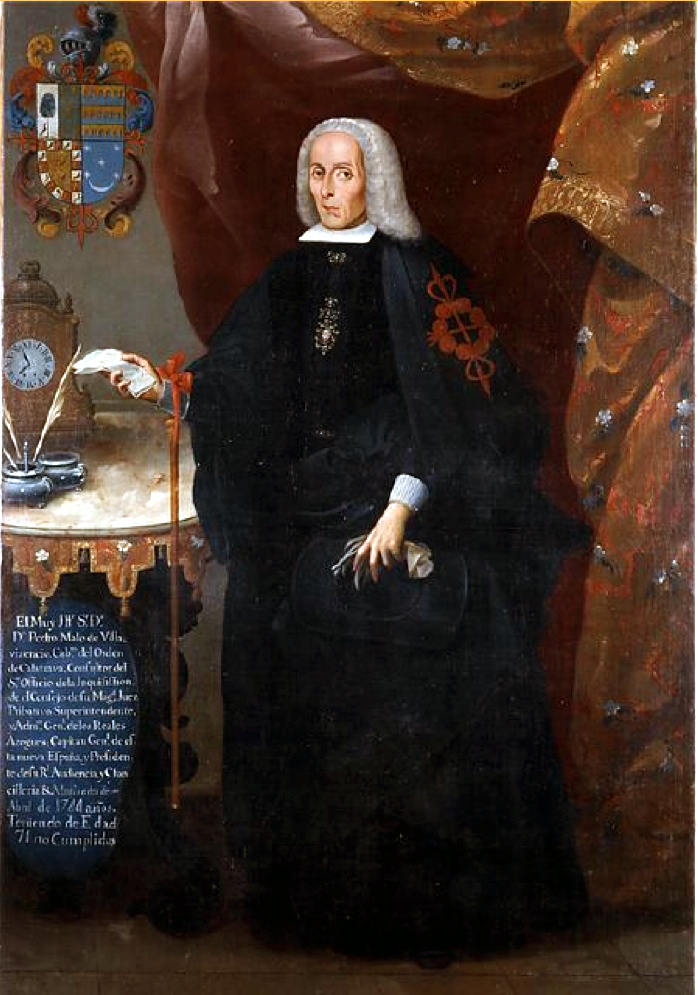
Presidente de la real audiencia y virrey de la nueva españa

Pedro Malo de Villavicencio (sometimes Pedro de Malo de Villavicencio) was a member of the Royal Audiencia of Mexico City in the first half of the eighteenth century. From August 1741 to November 3, 1742, he served as viceroy of New Spain, in his capacity as president of the Audiencia.

== Biography ==
Dr. Malo de Villavicencio was a native of Seville, Spain. He arrived in New Spain in 1709. As prosecutor in the Audiencia, he made a comprehensive report to the viceroy on the infestation of brigands on the highway between Puebla de los Angeles and Mexico City. For this and other valuable work, the military auditor rewarded him with the rank of colonel of infantry. The auditor did this by completing one of the blank letters patent the king had supplied him to reward such services.

He was president of the Audiencia when Viceroy Pedro de Castro y Figueroa died, on August 22, 1741. In this capacity, he served as interim viceroy until April 30, 1742, when the new viceroy, Pedro Cebrián, 5th Count of Fuenclara, arrived to fill the vacancy.

== See also ==
- List of Viceroys of New Spain
