= Juan Antonio de Vizarrón y Eguiarreta =

Mexican politician

His Excellency Juan Antonio de Vizarrón
- Archbishop of Mexico
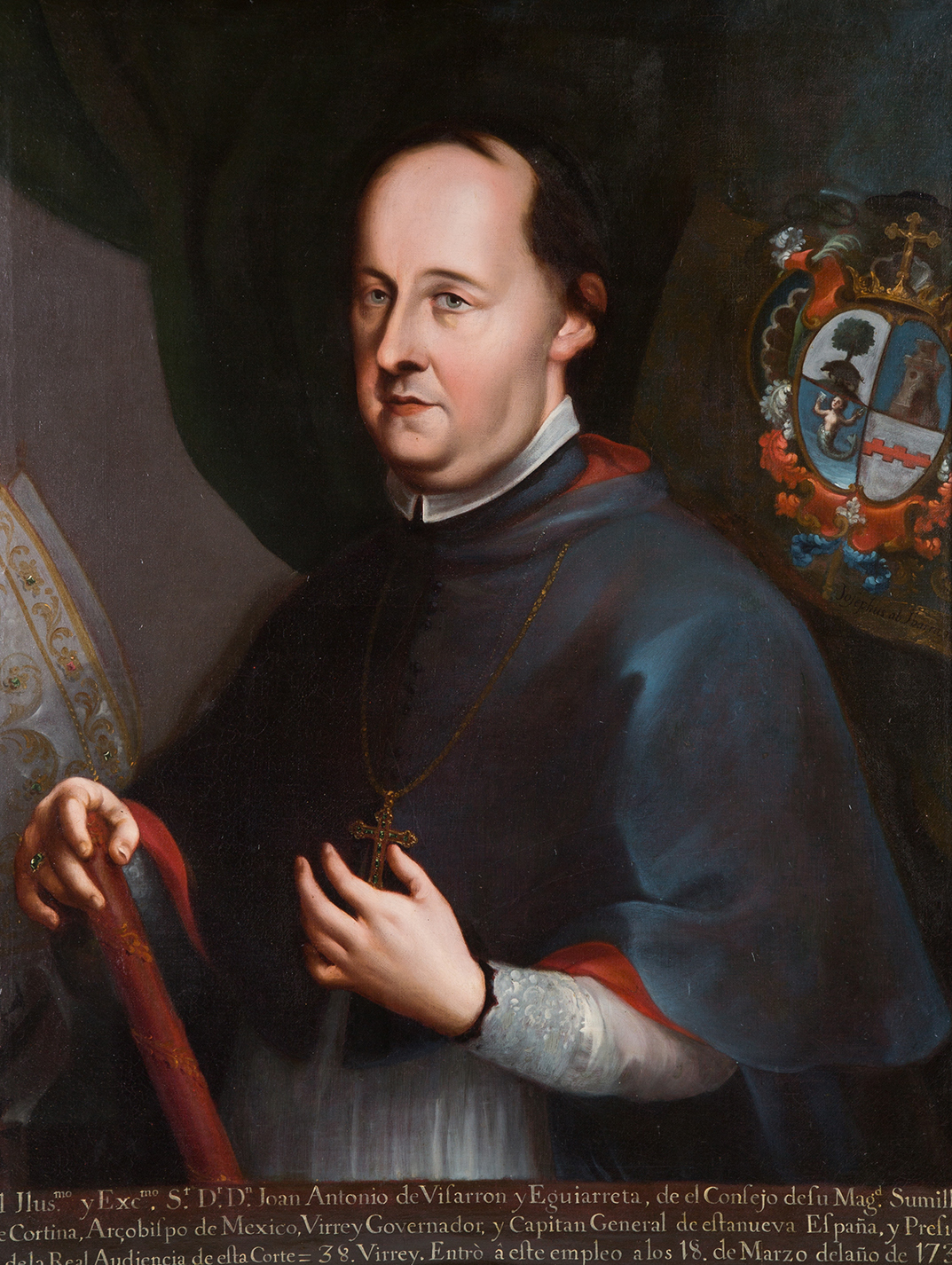
- Portrait by José de Ibarra
- Church: Roman Catholic Church
- See: Mexico
- Installed: 24 July 1730
- Term ended: 25 January 1747
- Predecessor: José Lanciego y Eguilaz
- Successor: Manuel Rubio y Salinas

Personal details
- Born: 2 September 1682 El Puerto de Santa María, Spain
- Died: 25 January 1747 (aged 64) Mexico City, New Spain

38th Viceroy of New Spain
- In office 17 March 1734 – 17 August 1740
- Preceded by: Juan de Acuña
- Succeeded by: Pedro de Castro

Juan Antonio de Vizarrón y Eguiarreta (2 September 1682 in El Puerto de Santa María, Spain – 25 January 1747 in Mexico City, Spain) was archbishop of Mexico from 21 March 1731 to 25 January 1747, and viceroy of New Spain from 17 March 1734 to 17 August 1740.

== Early career ==
He studied in the College of San Clemente in Rome. At the time he was named archbishop of Mexico (13 January 1730), he was archdeacon in the patriarchal church in Seville. He was also chaplain to the king. He was consecrated archbishop in Mexico City on 13 May 1730, and took formal possession of the archdiocese on 21 March 1731.

== Actions as viceroy ==
In 1734 he took over the government of the viceroyalty in conformity with sealed orders from the Crown. These orders were to be opened by the Audiencia in the event of the death of the previous viceroy, Juan de Acuña, marqués de Casafuerte. They named Vizarrón y Eguiarreta as his successor.

As viceroy, he confiscated the property of the Duke of Monteleone, a descendant of Hernán Cortés, because of his involvement in the war against Philip V of Spain in Naples. He reinforced the presidios in Coahuila because of the nearby French presence. Two of these were located 30 and 55 leagues (170 and 300 km) north of Monclova.

== The disasters of 1735 and 1736 ==
In 1735 a storm completely flooded the settlement of San Augustín, Florida, and the viceroy sent aid.

The year 1736 was disastrous for New Spain. Strong north winds uprooted trees and toppled weathercocks and crosses on the buildings. A comet appeared, provoking panic in the population, who feared it portended great disasters. In October a fearful epidemic of matlazáhuatl (perhaps yellow fever or smallpox) broke out in the vicinity of Mexico City. Vizarrón y Eguiarreta tried to mitigate the effects of the epidemic, which was said to have taken the lives of two-thirds of the Indian population of the capital. It certainly killed tens of thousands of people, mostly Indians, in many cities and villages. To combat the plague, he ordered many public buildings converted into hospitals, and he swore an oath to the Virgin of Guadalupe in 1737. He supplied food to the sick.

== Further actions as viceroy ==
Also in 1736 new silver mines were discovered in Arizona, resulting in a rush of miners to the north.

In 1737 a religious prophet appeared among the Guaima and Pima Indians. This was Agustín Ascuchul, who claimed that the god Moctezuma had appeared to him and named him his prophet. He called on the Indians to follow him to a new place, to worship the god. More than 5,000 Indians abandoned their homes to follow the prophet. The governor of Sonora, Juan Bautista de Anza, interpreted this as a rebellion. He soon suppressed it and hung the prophet.

The English were still importing much contraband, and the viceroy took steps to suppress this trade. When the Armada de Barlovento (coast guard) detained four English ships on the high seas heading for New Spain, Vizarrón y Eguiarreta was on the point of breaking relations. The English sent a strong squadron to the region, but the incident was resolved diplomatically. In 1739 the English declared war on Spain and were threatening to invade Spanish possessions in the Americas. Because of the war with England, Vizarrón y Eguiarreta reinforced the garrisons at San Juan de Ulúa and Veracruz, and he sent arms, militiamen, supplies and money to the military posts in Florida, Puerto Rico, Santo Domingo and Cartagena.

He was reluctant to send aid to the Spanish in Baja California, where an uprising of Pericu Indians allied with marooned sailors had broken out. In 1734 in Baja California Pericu had killed two Jesuit missionaries, some soldiers and some friendly Indians. The Spanish and allied Christian natives took refuge in Loreto (Baja California Sur). The Jesuits in Baja asked the Viceroy to provide ships and men, but he only referred the matter to Madrid, which would cause interminable delay. It was only in 1735 when a manila galleon put in at San Jose del Cabo and was attacked and nearly looted by the rebels, that the ensuing uproar finally inspired the Viceroy to act.

He sent aid to the Capitanía General of Guatemala, where Indian uprisings had broken out. The rebels in Guatemala were armed and assisted by the English in Belize and were assaulting and robbing Spanish settlements on the coast. The viceroy also ordered a fleet of the Armada de Barlovento to the Virgin Islands to expel the Danish, but the fleet did not reach its destination.

He continued the campaign against banditry. He sent two million pesos in silver to Spain as a contribution to the rebuilding of the Royal Palace in Madrid, which had been destroyed by fire in 1734. The Mexico City mint was completed and streets were repaired. His reform of the coinage angered the silver merchants.

== Later life and career ==
He turned over civil power to Pedro de Castro y Figueroa, duque de la Conquista in 1740, but continued as archbishop until his death in 1747. During his ecclesiastical tenure he built the archbishop's palace and the College of San Fernando. He died in Mexico City 25 January 1747, and was interred in the cathedral there.

Religious titles
Preceded by José Lanciego y Eguilaz	Archbishop of Mexico; 1731 – 1747	Succeeded by Manuel Rubio y Salinas
Government offices
Preceded by Juan de Acuña	Viceroy of New Spain; 1734 – 1740	Succeeded by Pedro de Castro y Figueroa
