= Pedro de Castro, 1st Duke of la Conquista =

Mexican politician

The Most Excellent The Duke of la Conquista KOS OSJ
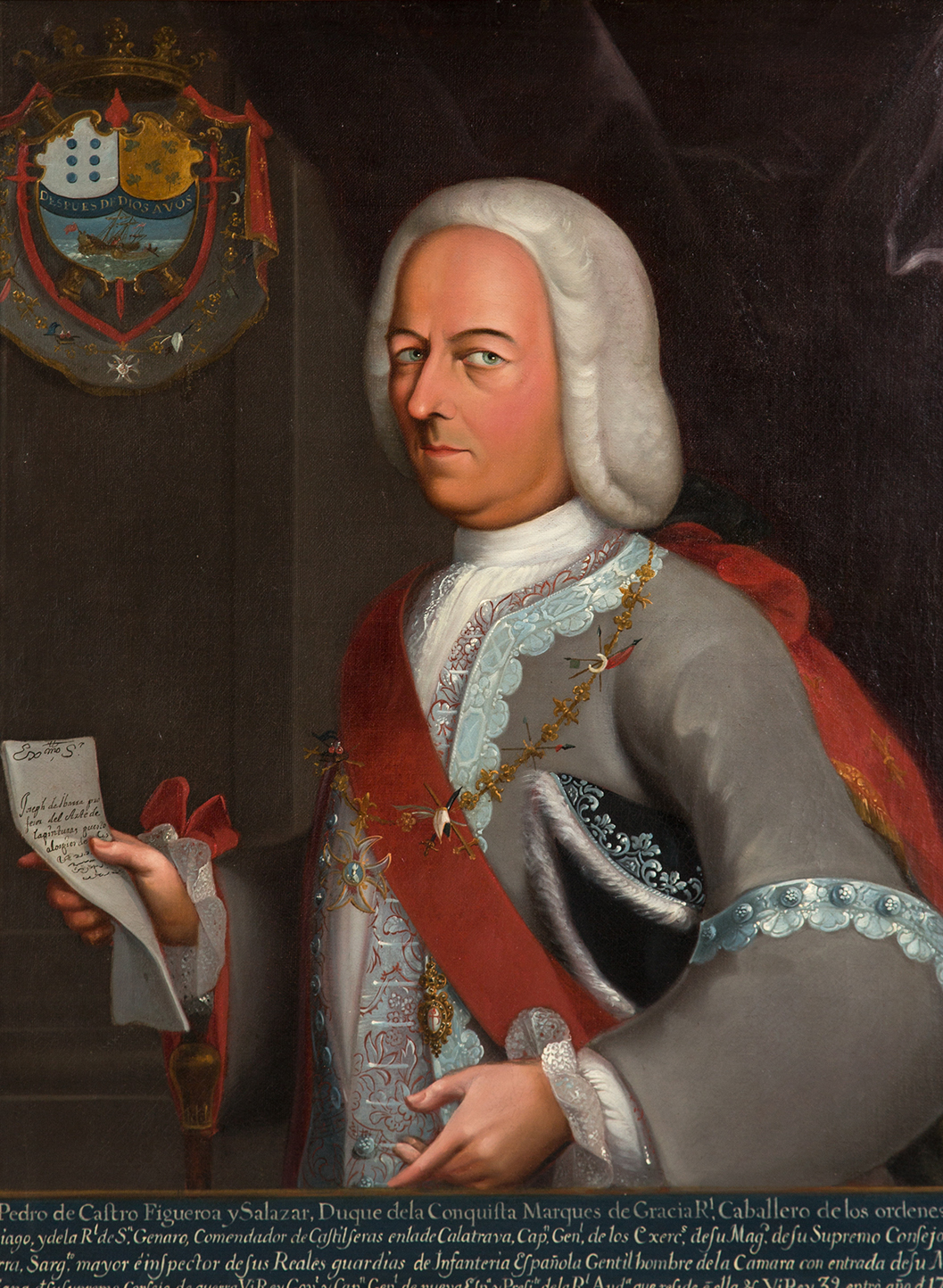
- Portrait by José de Ibarra

39th Viceroy of New Spain
- In office 17 August 1740 – 22 August 1741
- Monarch: Philip V
- Preceded by: Juan Antonio de Vizarrón
- Succeeded by: The Count of Fuenclara

Personal details
- Born: 8 December 1678 San Julián de Cela, Spain
- Died: 22 August 1741 (aged 62) Mexico City, New Spain
- Profession: Field Marshal

Pedro de Castro y Figueroa y Salazar, 1st Duke of la Conquista, 1st Marquess of Gracia Real, KOS, OSJ (8 December 1678, San Julián de Cela, A Coruña Province – 22 August 1741, Mexico City) was a Spanish military officer and viceroy of New Spain (from 17 August 1740 to 22 August 1741).

== In Spain ==
As a result of successful military action, King Philip V of Spain made Castro- Figueroa y Salazar Alvarado marqués de Gracia Real on 4 October 1729. Charles VII, king of the Two Sicilies (later Charles III of Spain), granted him the title of duque de la Conquista on 4 October 1735. In Spain he was lieutenant colonel of the royal guards of the Infantería Española, then field marshal, then captain general of the armies. He was later lord of the bedchamber to the king and president of the Real Audiencia. He was a knight of the military orders of Santiago and San Gennaro.

== As Viceroy of New Spain ==
He was named viceroy of New Spain by Philip V in 1740 to replace Juan Antonio de Vizarrón y Eguiarreta. The Dutch merchant ship transporting him to New Spain was detained by a British frigate near Puerto Rico, but he was able to launch a boat and, together with some other passengers, avoid being captured. He did, however, lose all of his luggage, including his credentials and the royal orders and instructions, therefore, arriving in San Juan, Puerto Rico, without papers. He then made his way to Veracruz, where he arrived on 30 June 1740. From Veracruz he wrote to the archbishop of Mexico, who recognized him as the new viceroy. He made his formal entry into Mexico City on 17 August 1740. To compensate Castro for the property he left behind onboard the Dutch merchantman, the Spanish Crown increased his salary to the amount then received by the viceroy of Peru.

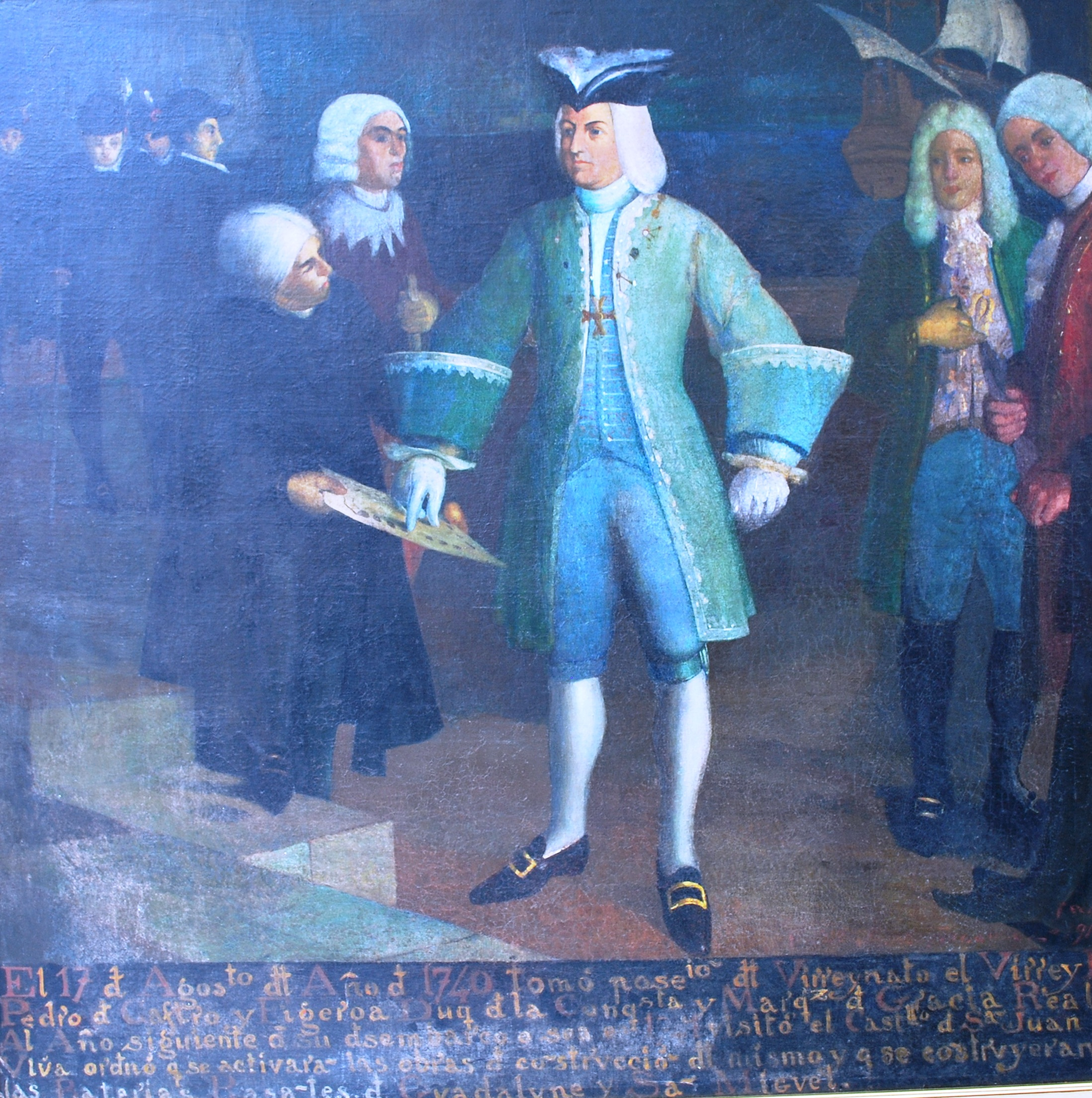
Pedro de Castro ordering the construction of Fort San Juan de Ulúa in Veracruz

During his period as viceroy, he worked to improve the mines at Zacatecas by improving the drainage system, supporting the missions in the Philippines, clearing obstructions from the port of Veracruz and deepening the harbor, and paying the costs of the one thousand soldiers sent by Spain to Cuba to protect against a potential British invasion. The new viceroy found the colony poorly defended and vulnerable to attacks by the French from the north and the British on the Caribbean coasts. He reinforced the garrison of St. Augustine, Florida (recently attacked by the British) by 300 soldiers.

British forces, under Admiral Edward Vernon, began offensive operations against the Spanish Empire, taking Portobelo, Panama in 1739, and laying siege to Cartagena (Colombia), which they did not succeed in taking. Fearing that Veracruz was next, Castro y Figueroa ordered construction of new batteries at San Juan de Ulúa, more supplies, the drafting of a militia, and the raising of a battalion of marines named La Corona. He went personally to Veracruz to supervise the new measures, but he soon came down with hemorrhagic dysentery. He was transported back to Mexico City, where he died on 22 August 1741.

== After his death ==
The Audiencia took over the government of the colony pending the arrival of a new viceroy, with its president, Pedro Malo de Villavicencio, serving in an acting capacity until the arrival of Castro de Figueroa's replacement in 1742. Castro y Figueroa was interred in the convent of La Piedad, south of Mexico City.

== Additional information ==
=== See also ===
- José de Escandón
- Lorenzo Boturini Bernaducci

=== Sources ===
- Hobbs, Nicolas (2007). "Grandes de España" (in Spanish). Archived from the original on October 25, 2008.
- Instituto de Salazar y Castro. Elenco de Grandezas y Titulos Nobiliarios Españoles (in Spanish). periodic publication.
- Castro Figueroa y Salazar, Pedro de. Enciclopedia de México (in Spanish). Vol. 3. Mexico City. 1988. ISBN 1-56409-016-7.
- García Purón, Manuel (1984). México y sus gobernantes (in Spanish). Vol. 1. Mexico City: Joaquín Porrua.
- Orozco Linares, Fernando (1985). Gobernantes de México (in Spanish). Mexico City: Panorama Editorial. ISBN 968-38-0260-5.
- Orozco Linares, Fernando (1988). Fechas Históricas de México (in Spanish). Mexico City: Panorama Editorial. ISBN 968-38-0046-7.
- "Short biography" (in Spanish). 2007.

Government offices
| Preceded by Juan Antonio de Vizarrón | Viceroy of New Spain; 1740-1741 | Succeeded by The Count of Fuenclara |
Spanish nobility
| New title | Duke of la Conquista; 1735-1741 | Succeeded by Bernardo de Castro y Azcárraga |
| New title | Marquess of Gracia Real; 1729-1741 | Succeeded by Bernardo de Castro y Azcárraga |
