= Timeline of Philippine history =

This is a timeline of Philippine history, comprising important legal and territorial changes and political events in the Philippines and its predecessor states. To read about the background to these events, see history of the Philippines.

== Prehistoric ==
Year (BCE)	Date	Event	Source
709,000		The arrival of the first Homo species to the early Chibanian.	
400,000		People belonging to the species Homo erectus set foot on the Philippines.	
250,000		Human habitation is said to be began.	
55,000		The first Homo sapiens in the Philippines.	
50,000		Early humans made stone tools in the Tabon Caves in Palawan.	
40,000		Negritos start to settle.	
35,000		At the old Kapampangan region was 10 times larger than the present borders, years ago, a series of eruptions from Mount Pinatubo dumped lava, ashes, tephra and lahar into the sea, forming the present landmass of the region.	
20,000		Tabon Man made stone tools in the Tabon Cave.	
8,000		The ancestors in the other caves: Batangas, Bulacan and Rizal. The other caves of Palawan: Guri and Duyong cave where the Homo sapiens lived.	
4,500–300		Multiple Austronesian migrations from Taiwan.	
c. 4000		Earliest evidence of rice growing, domesticating chickens and pigs.	
c. 3000		Presumed date of the Angono Petroglyphs.	
c. 2000		The Igorots built forts made of stone walls that averaged several meters in width and about 2 to 3 times the width in height around	

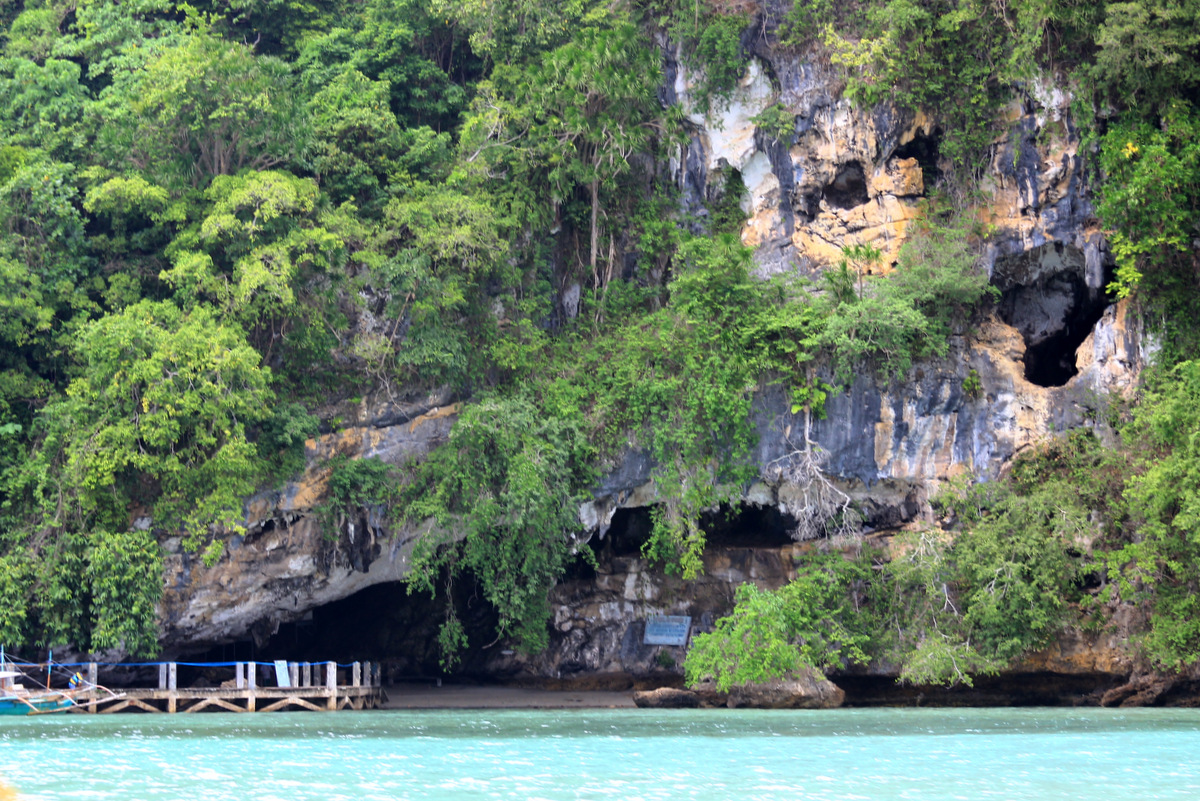
The Tabon Caves.

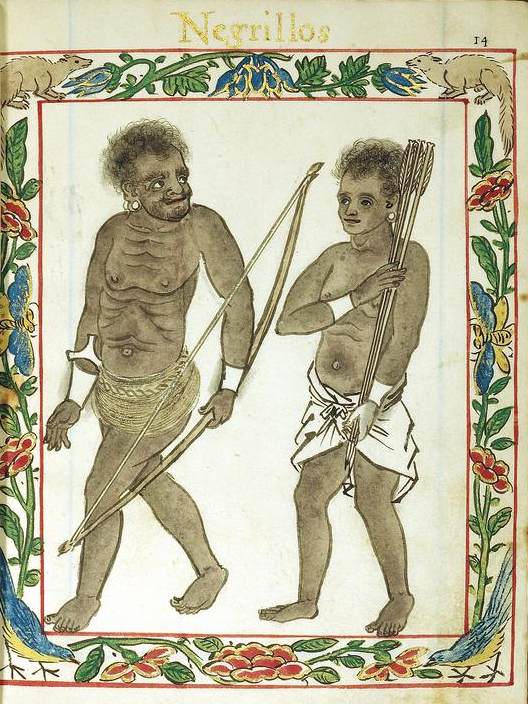
The Negritos.

Austronesian expansion map.

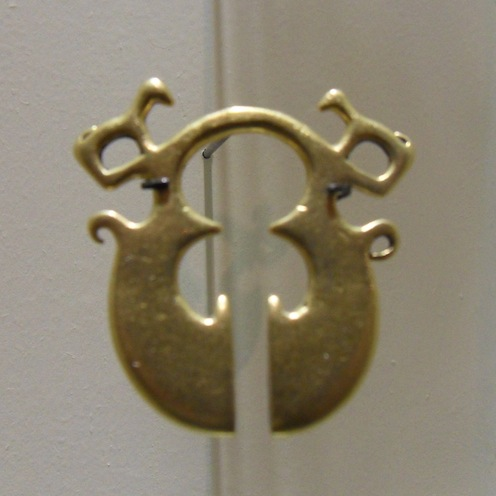
An example of Ling ling-0

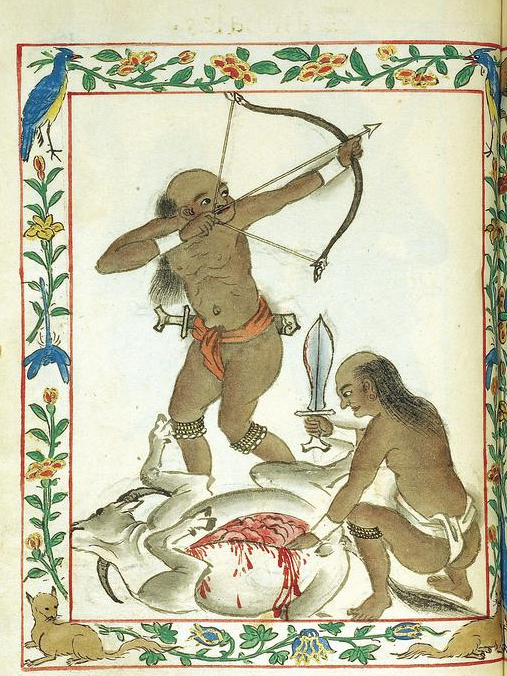
Animal hunting.

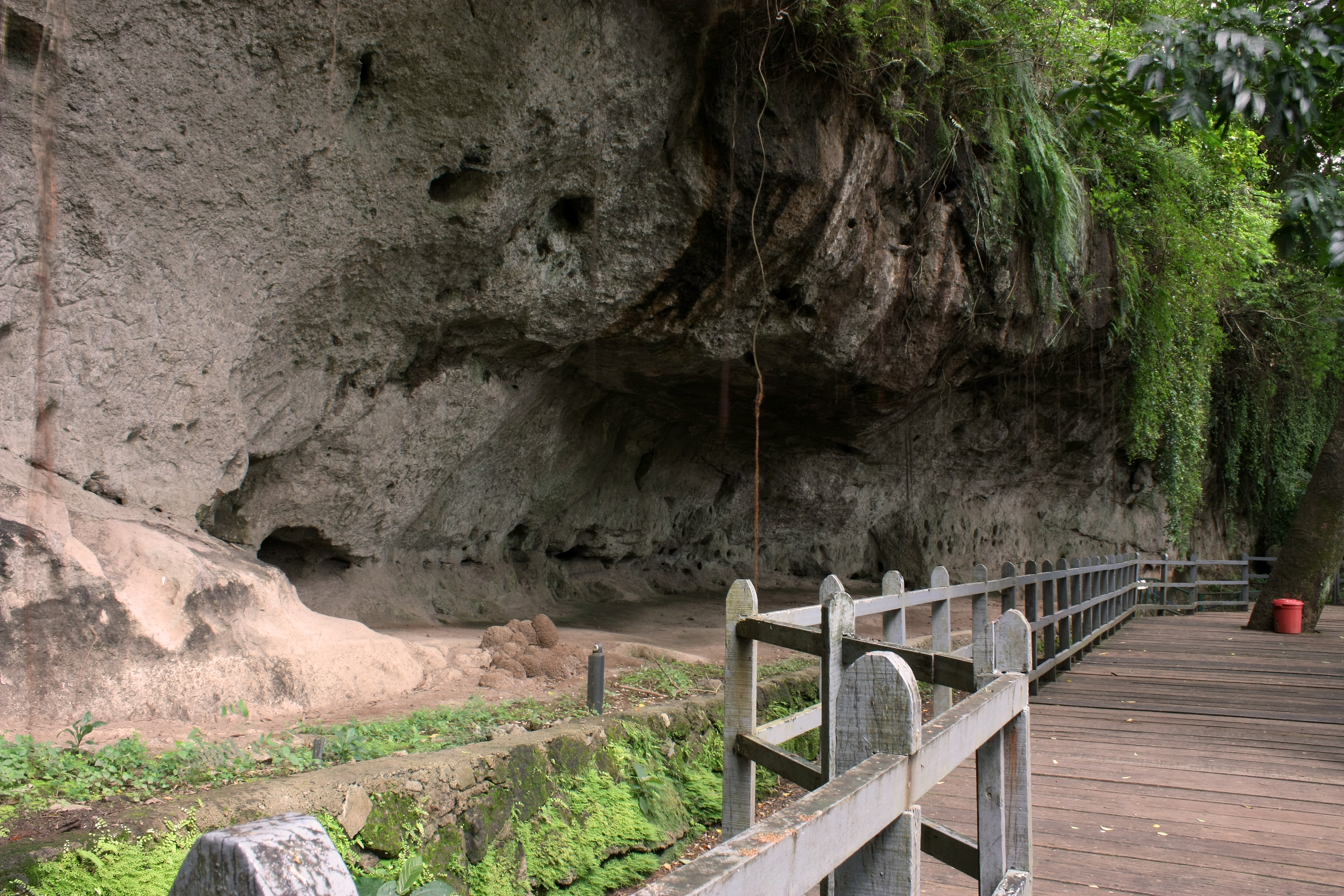
The Angono Petroglyphs.

== 11th–1st century BCE ==
Year (BCE)	Date	Event	Source
c.1000 BCE		The Late Neolithic period in the Philippines, evidence shows by a Yawning Jarlet on the Burial site in Leta-leta caves in Palawan by Robert Fox which had later become National treasure in the Philippines.	
c.1000 BCE		First mining in the Philippines began. The early Filipinos worked various mines of gold, silver, copper and iron. Jewels, gold ingots, chains, calombigas and earrings were handed down from antiquity and inherited from their ancestors. Gold dagger handles, gold dishes, tooth plating, and huge gold ornaments were also used.	
890–710 BCE		The Sa Huỳnh culture, evidence can be found in Manunggul Jar which is a secondary burial jar excavated from a Neolithic burial site in Manunggul cave of Tabon Caves at Lipuun Point. The depiction of sea-waves on the lid places this Manunggul jar in the Sa Huỳnh culture pottery tradition. These are people that migrated in an East to West migration from the Borneo-Palawan area to Southern Vietnam.	
600 BCE		The people of Palawan, Cordillera and Batanes become ancient goldsmith's. An ancient goldsmith shop had discovered that made the 20-centuries-old lingling-o, or omega-shaped gold ornaments in Batanes.	
c. 400 BCE		Larger villages came about- usually based near water, which made traveling and trading easier. The resulting ease of contact between communities meant that they began to share similar cultural traits, something which had not previously been possible when the communities consisted only of small kinship groups.	
300-200 BCE		The start of the Carabao (Water buffaloes) domestication and husbandry.	

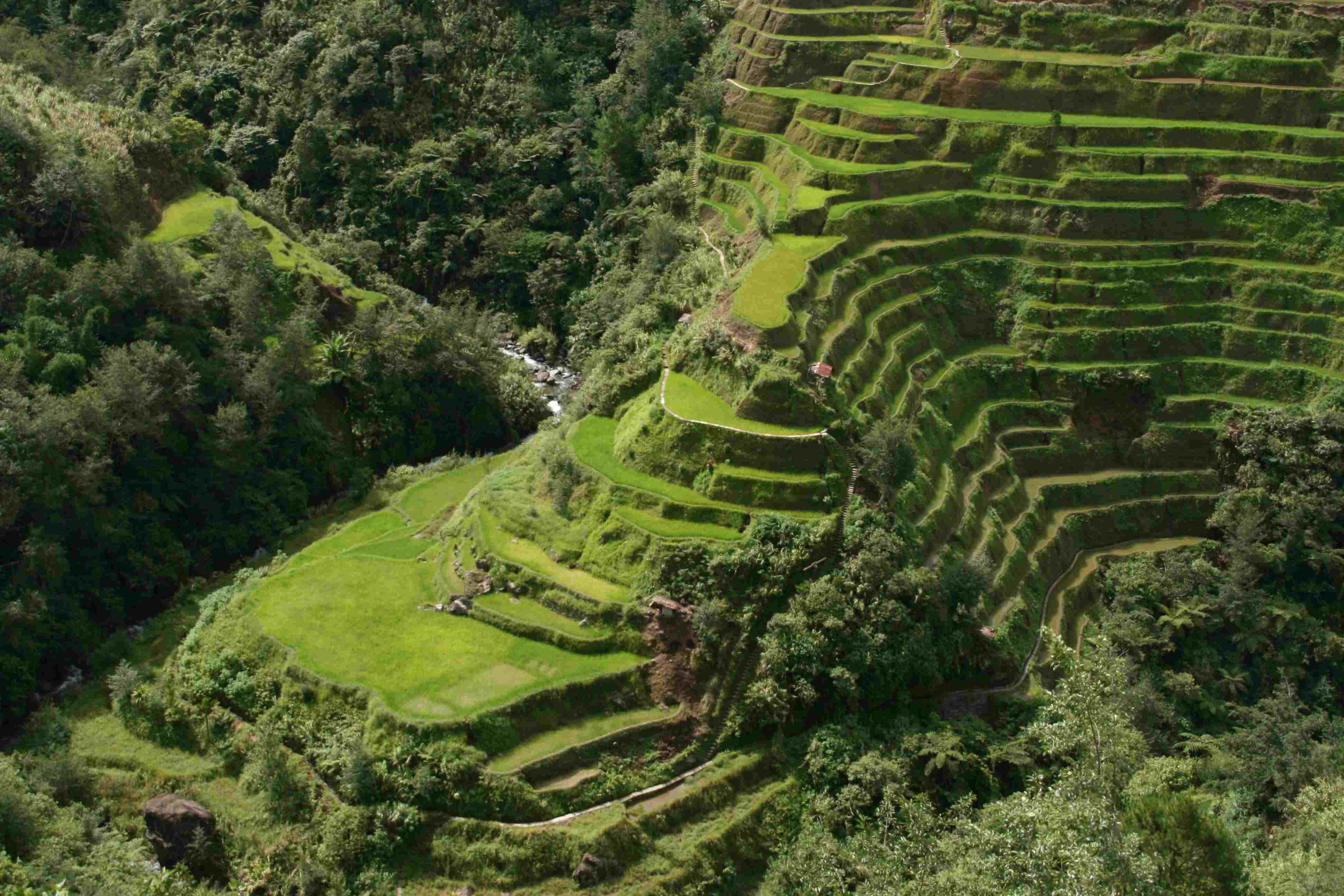
Banaue Rice Terraces in Luzon

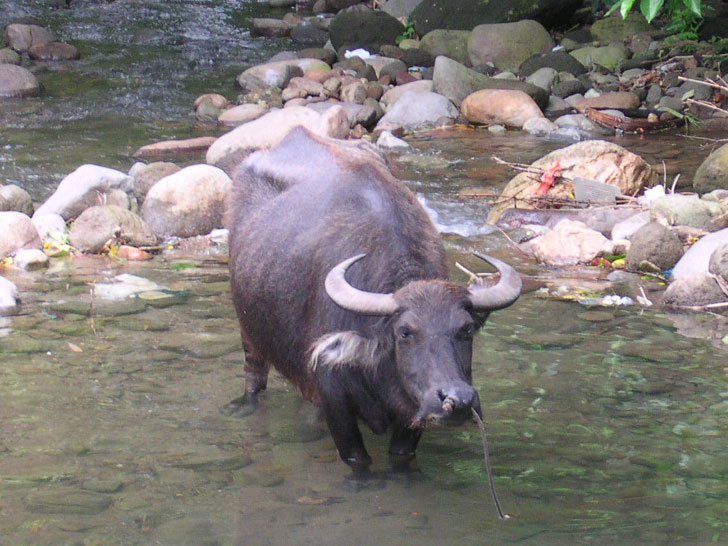
Carabao domestication

== 2nd–3rd century ==
Year	Date	Event	Source
c.200 AD		The Maitum Jars are anthropomorphic jars that were depicting children (head is the lead of the jar with ears and the body was the jar itself with hands and feet as the handle) with perforations in red and black colors, had been used as a secondary burial jars in Ayub Cave, Pinol, Maitum Sarangani province, each of the jars had a "facial expression". Another example of funeral pottery in the Philippines.	
c.200 AD		Since at least the 3rd century, the indigenous peoples were in contact with other Southeast Asian and East Asian nations. Fragmented ethnic groups established numerous city-states formed by the assimilation of several small political units known as barangay each headed by a Datu or headman (still in use among non-Hispanic Filipino ethnic groups) and answerable to a king, titled Lakan and Rajah.	
c.200 AD		Marks the end of the Sa Huỳnh culture, as people are merged into different Chiefdoms, Kingdoms and Thalassocracies, but the remnants of Sa Huỳnh has still practiced by the natives of Masbate the artifacts can be found in Kalanay Cave proof that the ancient Masbatenios still practiced the Sa Huyun culture until 1500 AD.	

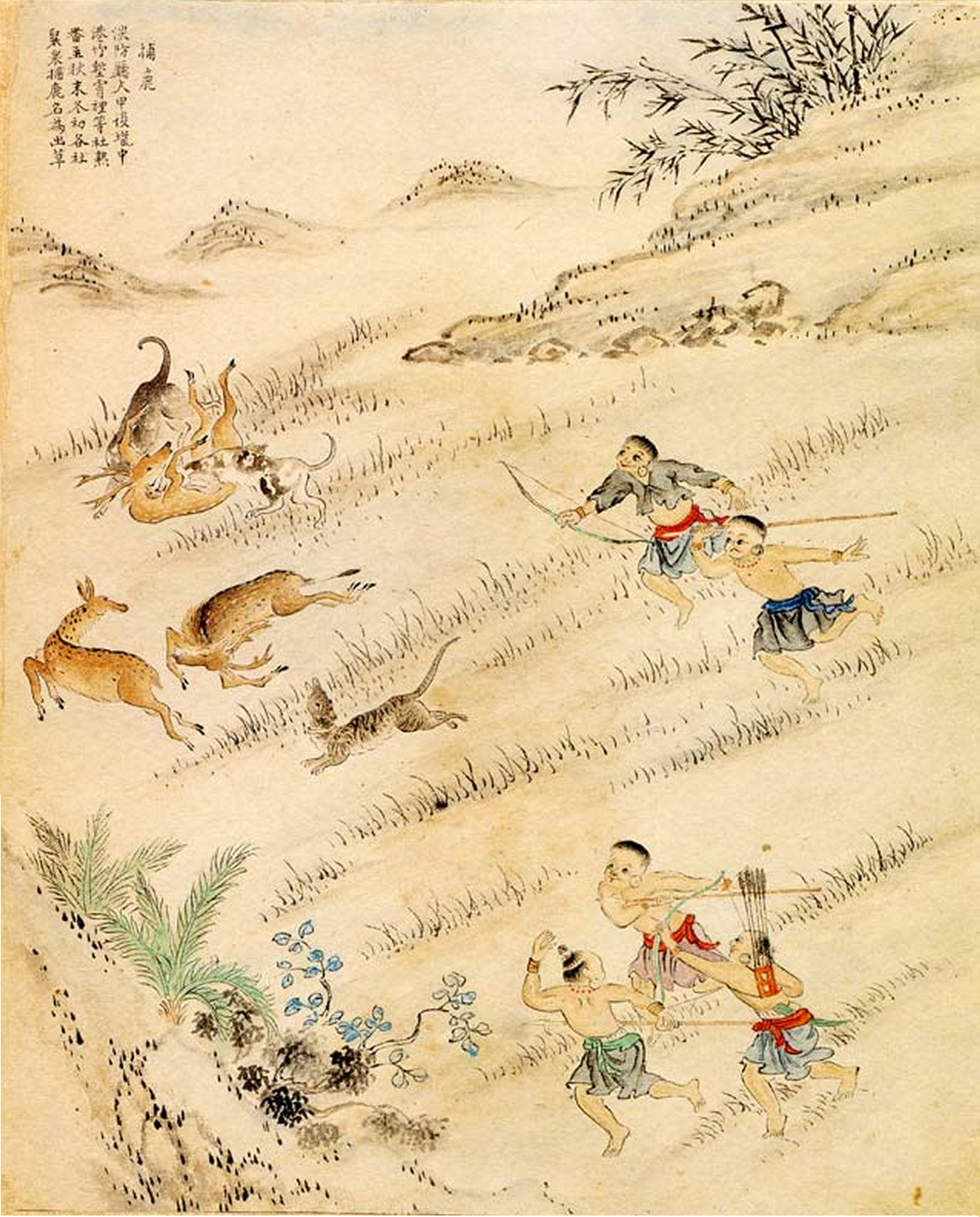
Deer hunting natives.

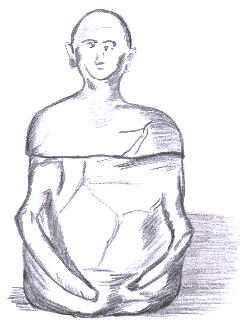
The Maitum Jars.

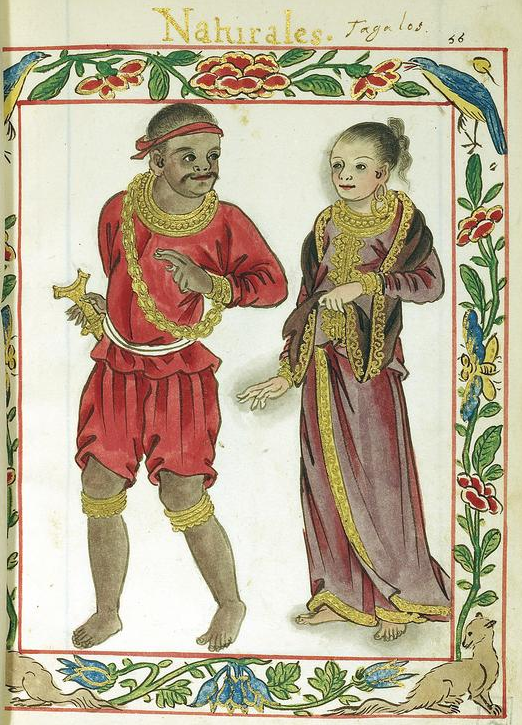
Maharlika, A Tagalog royal couple.

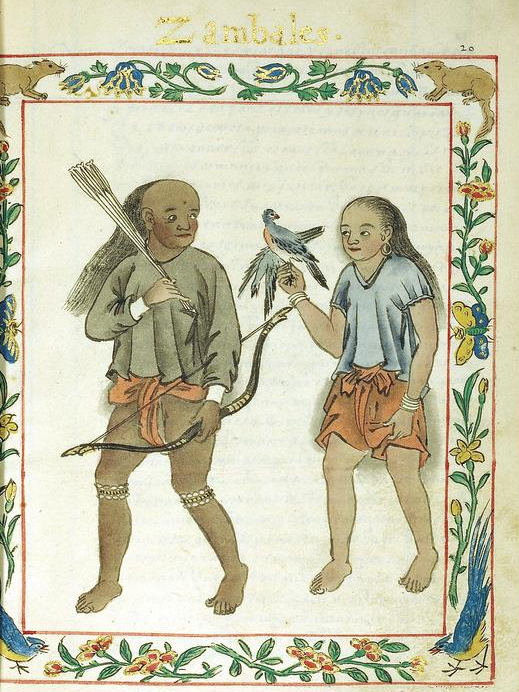
the Timawas (A free men) or a Middle class peoples.

== 8th century ==
Year	Date	Event	Source
700		The Birth of Kawi script, this Abugida are become widely used in the Maritime Southeast Asia, the word Kawi or Kawikaan means "Poetry" in Sanskrit.	

The Greater India.

The spread of Hinduism.
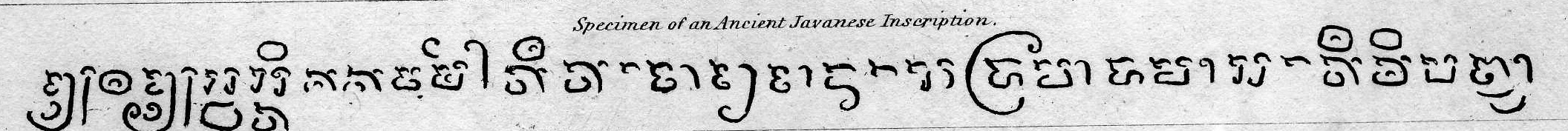
the Kawi script.

== 10th century ==
Year	Date	Event	Source
900	April 21	End of prehistory. Laguna Copperplate Inscription, the earliest known Philippine document, is written in the region around Laguna de Bay in Kawi script.	
971–982		The earliest date suggested for direct Chinese contact with the Philippines was 982. At the time, merchants from "Ma-i" (now thought to be either in Bulalacao, Mindoro or Bay, Laguna on the shores of Laguna de Bay).	
1000		Buddhism and Hinduism along with the Animism became the religion of the most of Philippine archipelago by the influence of its neighbors. Around the feet of Mt. Kamhatik near Mulanay town in Quezon Province once stood a 280-hectare ancient village where the archeologists found a 1000-year-old limestone coffins on a jungle-covered mountain top from 2011 to 2012 proof of the advance burial rituals of the early Filipinos.	

Expansion of Buddhism, originated from India in the 6th century BCE to the rest of Asia until present.

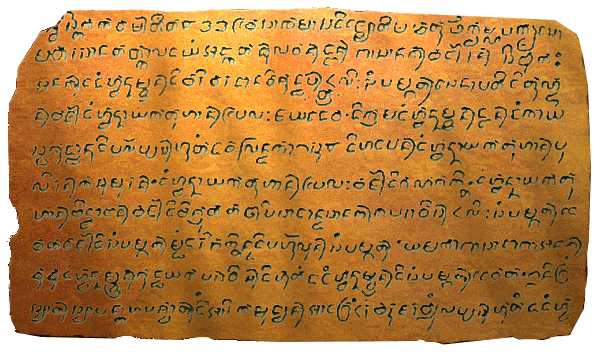
The Laguna Copperplate Inscription (LCI).

== 11th century ==
Year	Date	Event	Source
1000		People from Central Vietnam called Orang Dampuan established trade zones in Sulu	
1000		The construction of Idjangs in Batanes Islands (mountain fortress-cities) built by Ivatans.	
1001	March 17	Song Shih document records tributary delegation from the Indic Rajahnate of Butuan.	

== 12th century ==
Year	Date	Event	Source
c.1155		At the time, the trade in large native Ruson-tsukuri (literally Luzon made in Japanese: 呂宋製 or 呂宋つくり) clay jars used for storing green tea and rice wine with Japan flourished in the 12th century, and local Tagalog, Kapampangan and Pangasinense potters had marked each jar with Baybayin letters denoting the particular urn used and the kiln the jars were manufactured in.	
1174–1175		Raiders coming from Visayas conducted a series of raids on Formosa (modern-day Taiwan), which was part of Song dynasty China.	
c. 1180		Before the establishment of the Sultanate of Sulu, The Indianized chiefdom of Lupah Sug (which is the present day Jolo, Sulu) was flourishing. Dwelling of the Buranun peoples under the rule of Rajah Sipad the Older.	

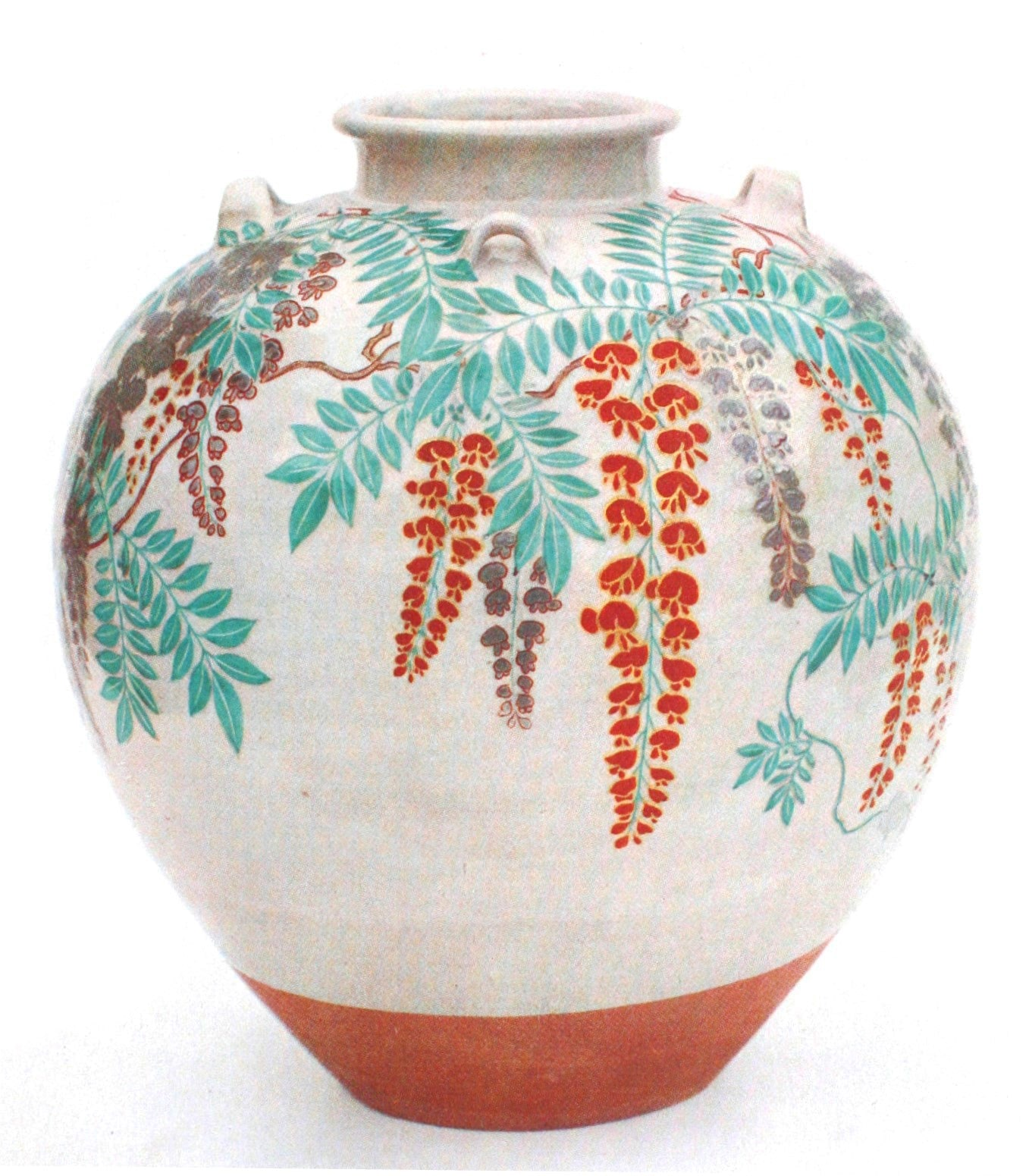
The Ruson-tsukuri (literally Luzon made in Japanese:呂宋製 or 呂宋つくり) clay jars used for storing green tea and rice wine.

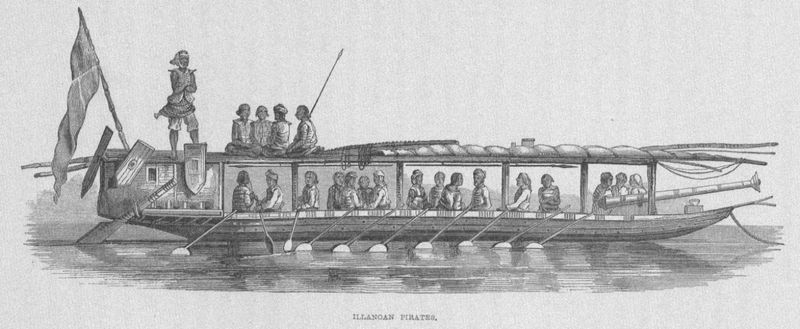
An ancient battleship called Karakowa, similar to the Balangay.

== 13th century ==
Year	Date	Event	Source
1200		The process of Kabayan mummification had begun in Ibaloi Benguet which is also called Fire mummies.	
1240		Tuan Masha'ika, an Arab, travels and introduces Islam to Sulu.	
		The Buddhist Ma-i was flourishing in the island of Mindoro. Zhao Rukuo, a superintendent of maritime trade in Fukien province wrote the book entitled Zhu Fan Zhi ("Account of the Various Barbarians") in which he described trade with a country called Ma-i in the island of Mindoro in Luzon (pronounced "Ma-yi") which was a precolonial Philippine state.	

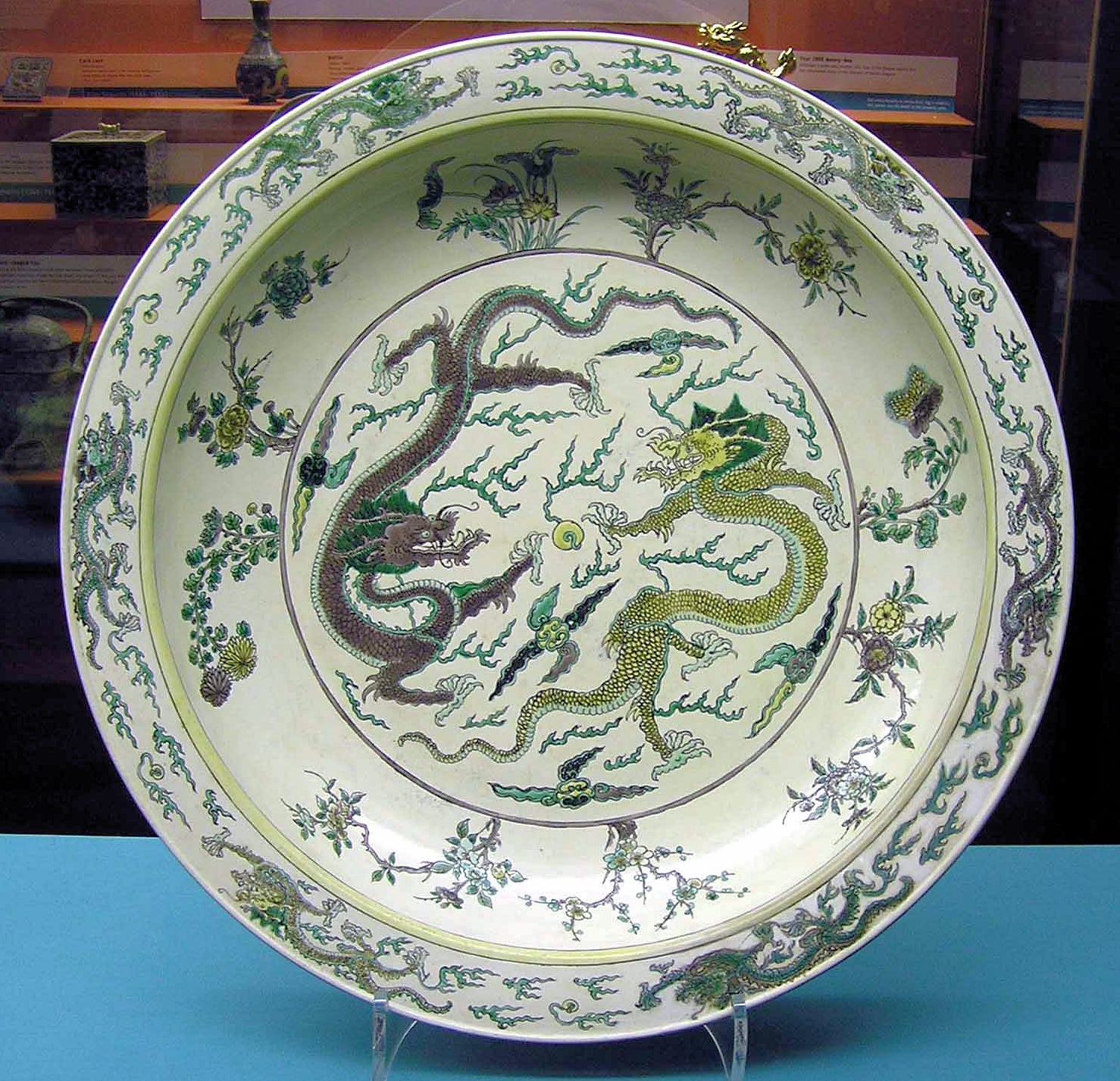
Chinese porcelain-ware, Kangxi era (1662–1722), Qing dynasty. Ancient Chinese porcelain excavated in Mindoro, Philippines; proves the existence of trade between the island and Imperial China. This consequently validates Chinese historical records of the area.

== 14th century ==
Year	Date	Event	Source
c.1300		The adoption of Baybayin, a Brahmic script.	
1369		Sulu attacked the Majapahit and its province Po-ni (Brunei), looting it of treasure and gold. A fleet from Majapahit succeeded in driving away the Sulus, but Po-ni was left weaker after the attack.	
1380		Sheikh Karim-ul Makhdum arrives in Jolo and builds a Mosque.	
1390		Baguinda Ali arrives in Buansa, Sulu and the people named him Rajah.	

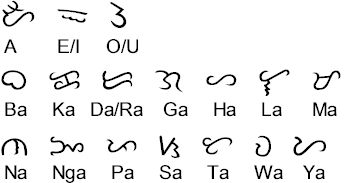
The Baybayin.

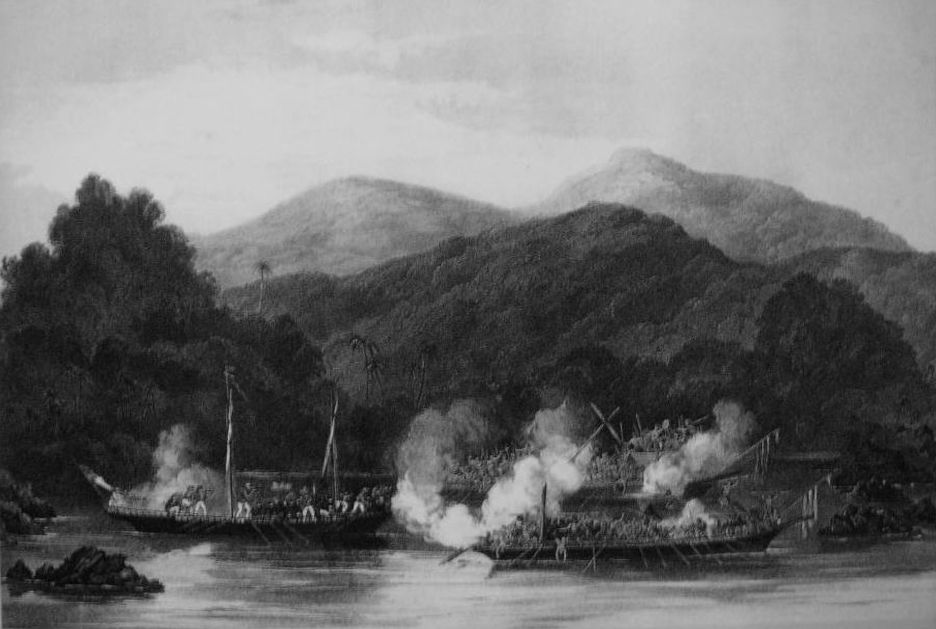
The Sulus attacked Majapahit and its province Po-ni (Brunei), looting it of treasure and gold.

== 15th century ==
Year	Date	Event	Source
c. 1400		Cebu was founded after the arrival of Sri Lumay from Sumatra. Namayan instated Lakantagkan as its sovereign. The vast domain comprised what are now Quiapo, San Miguel, Santa Mesa, Paco, Pandacan, Malate, Santa Ana in Manila, Mandaluyong, San Juan, Makati, Pasay, Pateros, and portions of Pasig.	
1405		The Yongle Emperor instituted a Chinese envoy on Luzon during Zheng He's voyages and appointed Ko Ch'a-lao to that position in 1405. China also had vassals among the leaders in the archipelago. China attained ascendancy in trade with the area in Yongle's reign.	
1411		Paduka Pahala reigned as the King of Lupah Sug in Sulu. He and his family and 300 other people of noble descent sailed to China, he was to pay tribute to the Yongle Chinese emperor, Zhu Di, who was of the Ming dynasty. While he was welcomed by the emperor upon his arrival in China, he nevertheless contracted a mysterious disease on his way home and died at Dezhou, a town in Shandong province in China.	
1411	December 11	The Yongle Emperor holds a banquet in honor of Pangasinan and its Huang Liyu.	
1457		Sultanate of Sulu founded by Sayyid Abubakar Abirin.	
1458–1459	October 1547 – February 1549	The Lucoes, or warriors from Luzon send soldiers to the Burmese Siamese wars and faced the White elephants of the Royal Burmese Army, at the same time also aiding the Burmese King for the conquest of the Siamese capital, Ayuthaya.	

Flag of the Sultanate of Sulu

== 16th century ==
=== 1500s ===
Year	Date	Event	Source
1500		Rajah Salalila of Maynila married the daughter of Sultan Bolkiah of Brunei, effectively uniting the royal families of Maynila and Brunei.	
1500		The eruption of Mount Pinatubo in recorded history, The Buag Eruptive Period, Its eruptions were roughly the same size as those of 1991.	

=== 1520s ===
Year	Date	Event	Source
1521	March 16	Discovery of the Philippines: Portuguese Ferdinand Magellan lands on Homonhon with three small ships, named the Concepcion, Trinidad and Victoria. Magellan calls the place the Archipelago de San Lazaro since March 16 is the feast day of Saint Lazarus. He also lands on Samar island.	
1521	March 28	Magellan reaches the Philippines	
1521	March 29	Blood compact between Magellan and Rajah Kulambo of Limasawa	
1521	March 31	The first mass on Philippine soil is celebrated.	
1521	April 7	Magellan lands on Cebu; meets Rajah Humabon of Cebu and enters into another blood compact.	
1521	April 14	The first Mass in Cebu province is celebrated, with about 500 natives, including Rajah Humabon and his wife, baptized into the Catholic Church.	
1521	April 27	Magellan is killed by Lapu-Lapu in the battle of Mactan; Spaniards defeated.	
1525		Spain sends an expedition under Juan Garcia Jofre de Loaysa to the Philippines. The Loaysa Expedition failed	
1526		Spain sends another expedition under Juan Cabot to the Philippines. The Cabot Expedition also failed	
1527		Spain sends a fourth expedition under Álvaro de Saavedra Cerón to the Philippines.	
1529		Saavedra's expedition returns to Spain without Saavedra who died on the way home.	

=== 1530s ===
Year	Date	Event	Source
1536		The Loaysa expedition returns to Spain. One of its survivors is Andres de Urdaneta, its chronicler.	

=== 1540s ===
Year	Date	Event	Source
1543		Spain sends a fifth expedition under Ruy López de Villalobos to the Philippines. The Expedition succeeds.	
1543	February 2	Villalobos arrives in the Philippines and names the islands of Samar and Leyte as Las Islas Filipinas in honor of the crown prince of Spain, Philip of Asturias; he also becomes the first to explore Mindanao island, naming it "Cesarea Caroli."	

=== 1560s ===
Year	Date	Event	Source
1565		Arrival of the Augustinians	
1565	February 13	Miguel López de Legazpi arrives in the Philippines, landing in Cebu, with four ships and 380 men	
1565	April 27	Legazpi returns to Cebu; settlement established.	
1565	May 8	Legazpi established the first permanent Spanish settlement in the country	
1565	June 4	Legazpi, representing King Philip II of Spain, and Rajah Tupas of Cebu signed the Treaty of Cebu, effectively establishing Spanish suzerainty over Cebu.	
1565		Philippines was governed as a territory of the Viceroyalty of New Spain.	
1567		Dagami Revolt (1567)	
1568		The Portuguese, under the command of General Gonzalo de Pereira, attack Cebu and blockade its port.	
1569		Present-day Capiz Province becomes a Spanish settlement.	
1569		Legazpi moves the seat of government from Cebu to Iloilo.	
1569	August 6	King Philip II of Spain, through a royal decree, creates Cebu as the country's first Spanish province; he also appoints Miguel Lopez de Legazpi as governor and captain general of the territory.	

=== 1570s ===
Year	Date	Event	Source
1570		The Portuguese attacked a Spanish colony in Cebu but were repulsed.	
1570	May	Legazpi sends an expedition under the leadership of Martin de Goiti to Manila.	
1571	January 1	Legazpi establishes municipality of Cebu and names it "Villa del Santisimo Nombre de Jesus" (Town of the Most Holy Name of Jesus).	
1571	May 19	The ruler of Manila, Rajah Suliman, wages war against the Spaniards	
1571	June 24	Legazpi establishes the Spanish Colonial Government in Manila and proclaims it the capital of the colony	
1571	December 11	Provincehood of Pampanga, first province in Luzon to be inaugurated by the Spaniards.	
1572	August 20	Legazpi dies and Guido de Lavezaris succeeds him as Governor-General (1572–1575)	
1574	November 7	Enslavement of Filipinos is prohibited by a royal cedula from the Spanish king, as a response to a protest against it a day earlier.	
1574		Chinese pirate Limahong, with his men, invades Luzon; proceeds later to Manila.	
1574	November 23	The Chinese pirate captain Limahong attacks Manila but fails	
1574	December 2	Limahong again attacks Manila with 1500 soldiers but again fails to defeat the Spaniards	
1574	December	Lakandula lead a short revolt against the Spanish.	
1575		Ciudad de Nueva Cáceres (later renamed as Naga City) established by Captain Pedro de Sanchez	
1575		Juan de Salcedo defeats Limahong and his men in Pangasinan, forcing them to flee into the mountains.	
1575	August 25	Francisco de Sande appointed Governor-General (1575–1580)	
1577		Arrival of the Franciscans	
1579		Diocese of Manila established	

=== 1580s ===
Year	Date	Event	Source
1580	April	Gonzalo Ronquillo de Peñaloza appointed Governor-General (1580–1583)	
1580	April 5	Establishment of Pangasinan as a provincial unit.	
1580		King Philip II of Spain becomes King of Portugal, ending the Portuguese harassment of the Philippines	
1580		The Spaniards institute forced labor on all male natives aged 16 to 60.	
1581		Arrival of the country's first bishop, Salazar.	
1581		Arrival of the Jesuits	
1581	March	Arrival of the first Dominicans in the Philippines	
1582		Battles take place between Spanish forces and Japanese Ronin	
1583	March 10	Diego Ronquillo appointed Governor-General (1583–1584)	
1583	August	A great fire destroys Manila.	
1584	May 16	Santiago de Vera appointed Governor-General (1584–1590)	
1585		Pampangos Revolt (1585)	
1586		The construction of San Agustin Church in Intramuros.	
1587	July 21	Arrival of Miguel de Benavides with the second batch of Dominicans in the Philippines, and the establishment of the Province of the Most Holy Rosary of the Philippines	
1587		Conspiracy of the Maharlikas (1587–1588)	
1589		Revolts Against the Tribute (1589)	

=== 1590s ===
Year	Date	Event	Source
1590		Missionaries from the Society of Jesus established the Colegio de Manila in Intramuros.	
1590	June 1	Gómez Pérez Dasmariñas appointed Governor-General (1590–1593)	
1592		Miguel de Benavides's Doctrina Christiana in Chinese published	
1593		Doctrina Christiana in Spanish and Tagalog is published in the first printing press said to be established by Dominicans.	
1593	October	Pedro de Rojas appointed Governor-General (1593)	
1593	December 3	Luis Pérez Dasmariñas appointed Governor-General (1593–1596)	
1593		Dominicans pioneer printing in the Philippines by producing through the old technique of xylography. This technique produced the Doctrina Christiana en Lengua Española y Tagala and the Doctrina Christiana en Lengua y Letra China, the first books in the Philippines	(Note: This technique produced the Doctrina Christiana en Lengua Española y Tagala and the Doctrina Christiana en Lengua y Letra China, the first books in the Philippines)
1594		Convent of Santa Isabel founded	
1595		Diocese of Manila raised to an archbishopric, with Bishop Ignacio Santibáñez its first archbishop	
1595		Diocese of Nueva Segovia established, with Miguel de Benavides as its first bishop.	
1595		Diocese of Caceres established, with Luis Maldonado as its first bishop.	
1595		Diocese of Cebu established, with Pedro de Agurto as its first bishop.	
1595		Colegio de San Ildefonso founded in Cebu	
1596		Magalat Revolt (1596)	
1596	July 14	Francisco de Tello de Guzmán appointed Governor-General (1596–1602)	
1598		Colegio de Santa Potenciana, the first school for girls in the Philippines, established	
1600		Pedro Bucaneg inscribes the oral epic Biag ni Lam-ang	

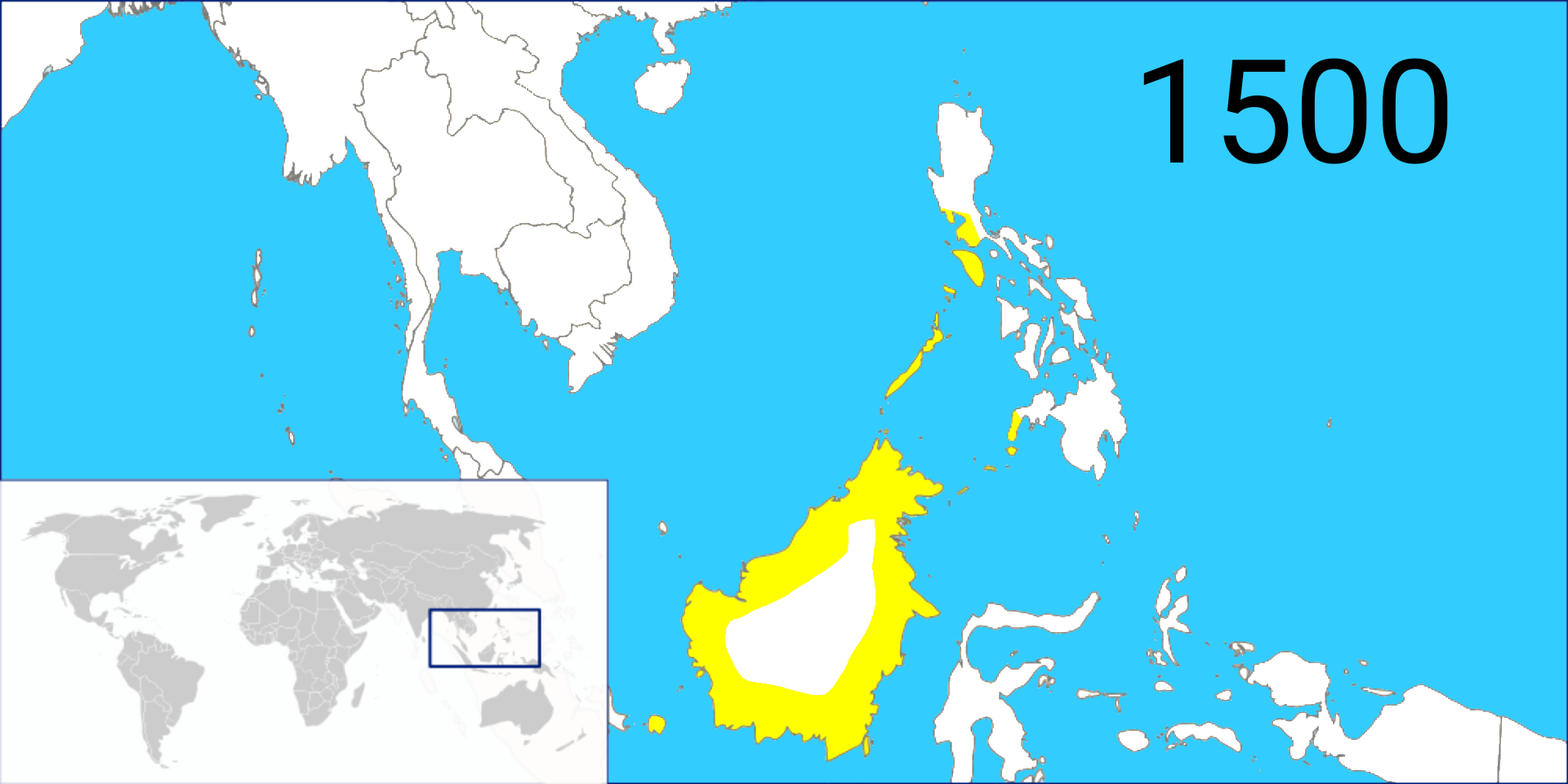
Territorial extent of the Bruneian Empire.

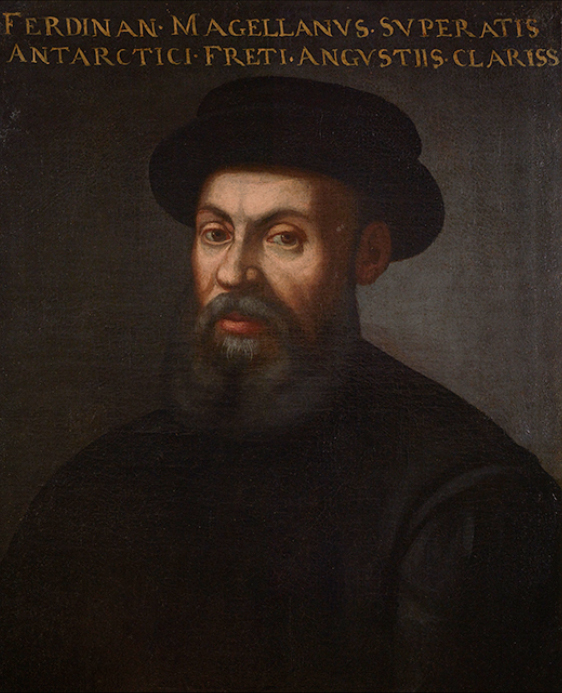
Ferdinand Magellan.

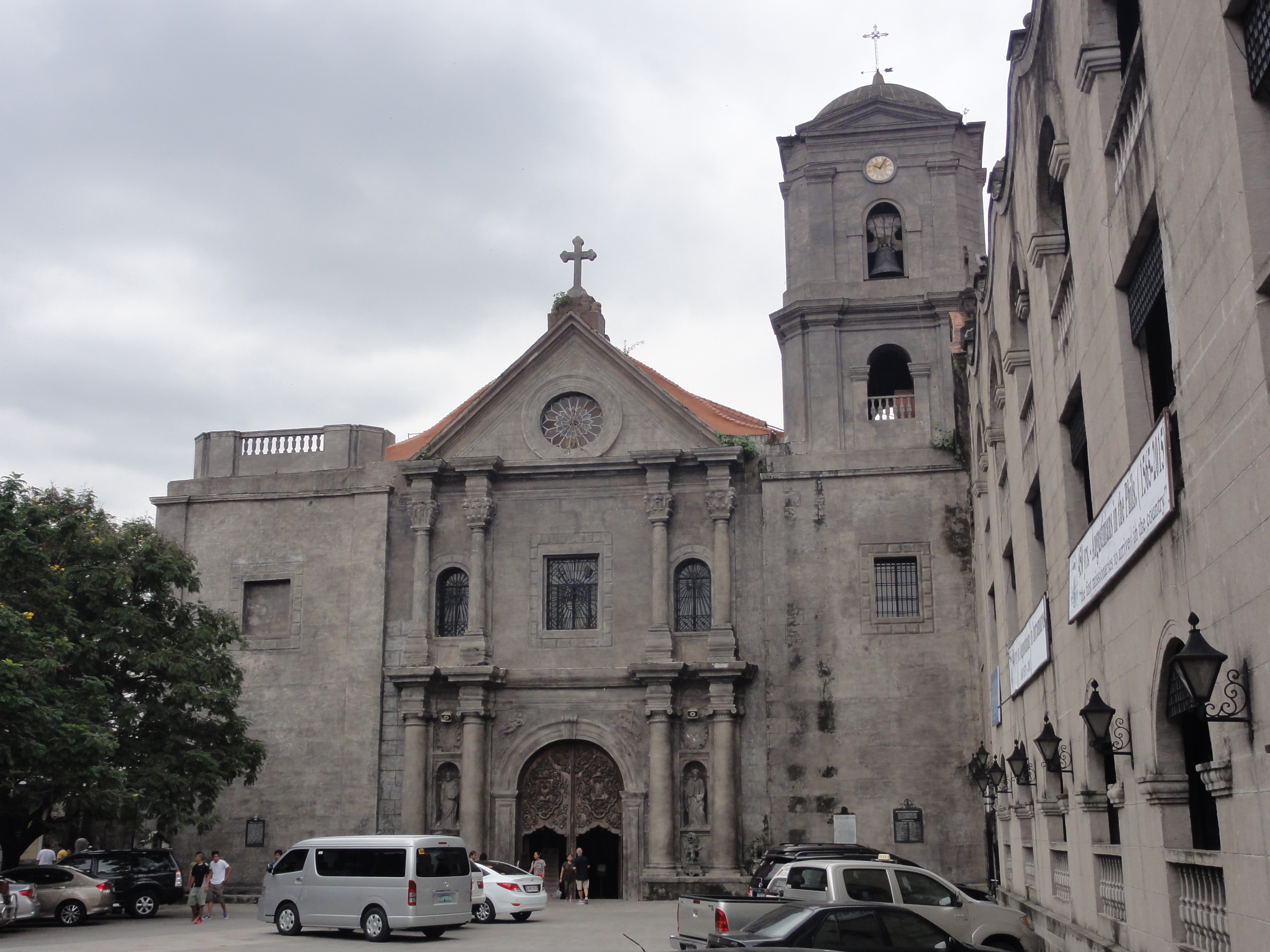
The San Agustin Church, the oldest catholic church in the Philippines.

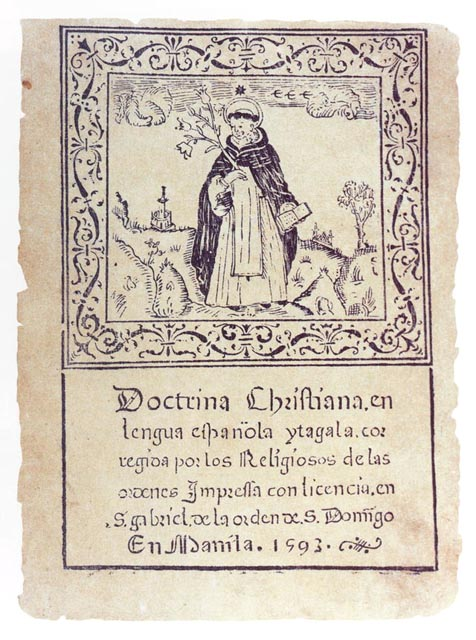
The Doctrina Christiana was an early book of Roman Catholic Catechism, written in 1593 by Fray Juan de Plasencia, and is believed to be one of the earliest printed books in the Philippines.

== 17th century ==
=== 1600s ===
Year	Date	Event	Source
1600		The Dutch attacks the archipelago in a tactical offensive during the European war between Spain and the Netherlands	
1600		Bandala System is formed by the Spanish Colonial Government	
1600		The Galleon trade between Manila and Acapulco, Mexico begins.	
1601		Igorot Revolt (1601).	
1601	August 1	Colegio de San Jose is established	
1602		Chinese revolt of 1602	
1602		Fray Blancas de San Jose, O.P. together with Tomas Pinpin succeeds in making typographic printing through movable type	
1602	May	Pedro Bravo de Acuña appointed Governor-General (1602–1606).	
1605	July 24	Archbishop Miguel de Benavides bequeaths his library and a total amount of ₱1,500 for the establishment of a seminary college, the present-day University of Santo Tomas in Manila.	(Note: The nucleus of ₱1,500 for the foundation of a seminary-college was increased to ₱7,140 by donations made by Pablo Rodríguez, Andrés Hermosa, and Juan Morales)
1606		Arrival of the Recollects	
1606	June 24	Cristóbal Téllez de Almanza appointed Governor-General (1606–1608) by the Audiencia Real.	
1608	June 15	Rodrigo de Vivero y Velasco appointed Governor-General (1608–1609).	
1609	April	Juan de Silva appointed Governor-General (1609–1616).	
1609		The Dominicans granted permission to open a seminary-college (the present-day University of Santo Tomas in Manila) by Philip III of Spain	
1609		Philip III issues a royal cedula requesting from Governor Juan de Silva and the Real Audiencia a report on the projected college (the present-day University of Santo Tomas in Manila).	

=== 1610s ===
Year	Date	Event	Source
1611		Philip III's permission to open the Dominican's seminary college (the present-day University of Santo Tomas) arrives in Manila	
1611	April 28	Act of Foundation for the establishment of the University of Santo Tomas, then known as the Colegio de Nuestra Señora del Santísimo Rosario (later renamed the Colegio de Santo Tomas), signed. The Document of Foundation was signed by Fr. Baltasar Fort, O.P., Provincial of the Dominican Province of the Holy Rosary, Fr. Francisco Minayo, O.P., Prior of the Santo Domingo Convent, and Fr. Bernardo de Santa Catalina, O.P., Commissary-General of the Holy Office of the Philippines. Notary Juan Illian witnessed the signing of the act of foundation.	
1612		Fr. Domingo Gonzalez, O.P. appointed to work on the completion of the organization of the Colegio de Nuestra Señora del Santísimo Rosario (presently the University of Santo Tomas in Manila)	
1612		The Colegio de Nuestra Señora del Santísimo Rosario (presently the University of Santo Tomas in Manila) formally opens	
1616	April 19	Andrés Alcaraz appointed Governor-General (1616–1618) by the Audiencia Real.	
1616	June 29	The Colegio de Nuestra Señora del Santísimo Rosario (presently the University of Santo Tomas in Manila) given authorization to confer academic degrees in Theology and Philosophy by the Holy See	
1616		Governor Alonso Fajardo de Entenza recognizes the Colegio de Nuestra Señora del Santísimo Rosario (presently the University of Santo Tomas in Manila)	
1618	July 3	Alonso Fajardo de Entenza appointed Governor-General (1618–1624).	
1619		University of Santo Tomas, then known as Colegio de Nuestra Señora del Santissimo Rosario, recognized by the Holy See.	

=== 1620s ===
Year	Date	Event	Source
1620		Colegio de San Juan de Letran established as the Colegio de Huerfanos de San Pedro y San Pablo.	
1621		The Colegio de Manila raised to the status of a university and renamed as the Universidad de San Ignacio by Pope Gregory XV.	
1621		Tamblot Revolt (1621–1622)	
1621		Bankaw Revolt (1621–1622)	
1624	July	Jeronimo de Silva appointed Governor-General (1624–1625) by the Audiencia Real.	
1624	July	Fernando de Silva appointed Governor-General (1624–1626).	
1624		The Faculties of Philosophy and Theology implemented by the royal order of Philip IV of Spain	
1625		Isneg Revolt (1625–1627)	
1625		Tomas Pinpin's printing press settles at the Colegio	
1626	June 29	Juan Niño de Tabora appointed Governor-General (1626–1632).	
1627		University of Santo Tomas, then Colegio de Santo Tomas, authorized to confer degrees by Pope Urban VIII.	

=== 1630s ===
Year	Date	Event	Source
1632	July 22	Lorenzo de Olaza appointed Governor-General (1632–1633) by the Audiencia Real.	
1632		Colegio de Santa Isabel established	
1633	August 29	Juan Cerezo de Salamanca appointed Governor-General (1632–1635).	
1635	June 25	Sebastián Hurtado de Corcuera appointed Governor-General (1635–1644).	
1637		Sucesos Felices is published by Tomas Pinpin; first newsletter in the country.	
1639		Cagayan Revolt (1639)	

=== 1640s ===
Year	Date	Event	Source
1640		Universidad de San Felipe de Austria established as the first Public University in the Philippines	
1643		Universidad de San Felipe de Austria closed down	
1643		Ladia Revolt (1643)	
1644	August 11	Diego Fajardo Chacón appointed Governor-General (1644–1653).	
1645		An earthquake destroys Manila.	
1645	November 20	The Colegio de Santo Tomas (present-day University of Santo Tomas in Manila) raised to the status of a university and renamed as the University of Santo Tomas by Pope Innocent X, upon the request of King Philip IV of Spain.	
1645		The Master General of the Dominican Order assumes the power of appointing the Rector Magnificus of Santo Tomas by virtue of the permission granted by Pope Innocent X	
1645		Zambales Revolt (1645)	
1645		Pampanga Revolt (1645)	
1646	October 4	Spanish and Filipino forces defeat the Dutch invaders in an encounter, their fifth and final battle, in Manila Bay near Corregidor in Cavite.	
1647		Dutch besieged the Spanish in the Battle of Puerto de Cavite.	
1649		Sumuroy Revolt (1649–50)	
1649		Pintados Revolt (1649–50)	

=== 1650s ===
Year	Date	Event	Source
1653	July 25	Sabiniano Manrique de Lara appointed Governor-General (1653–1663).	

=== 1660s ===
Year	Date	Event	Source
1660		Zambal Revolt (1660)	
1660	October 7	Maniago Revolt (1660)	
1660	December 15	Malong Revolt (1660–1661)	
1661		Ilocano Revolt (1661)	
1662		Chinese revolt of 1662	
1663	September 8	Diego de Salcedo appointed Governor-General (1663–1668).	
1663		Tapar Revolt (1663)	
1668	September 28	Juan Manuel de la Peña Bonifaz appointed Governor-General (1668–1669).	
1669	September 24	Manuel de León appointed Governor-General (1669–1677).	

=== 1670s ===
Year	Date	Event	Source
1677	September 21	Francisco Coloma appointed Governor-General (1677) by the Audiencia Real.	
1677	September 21	Francisco Sotomayor y Mansilla appointed Governor-General (1677–1678) by the Audiencia Real.	
1678	September 28	Juan de Vargas y Hurtado appointed Governor-General (1678–1684).	

=== 1680s ===
Year	Date	Event	Source
1680	May 12	University of Santo Tomas placed under Royal Patronage by King Charles II of Spain.	
1681		Sambal Revolt (1681–1683)	
1684	August 24	Gabriel de Curuzealegui y Arriola appointed Governor-General (1684–1689).	
1686		The construction of Paoay Church in Ilocos Norte.	
1686		Tingco plot (1686)	
1689	April	Alonso de Avila Fuertes appointed Governor-General (1689–1690) by the Audiencia Real	

=== 1690s ===
Year	Date	Event	Source
1690	July 25	Fausto Cruzat y Gongora appointed Governor-General (1690–1701).	

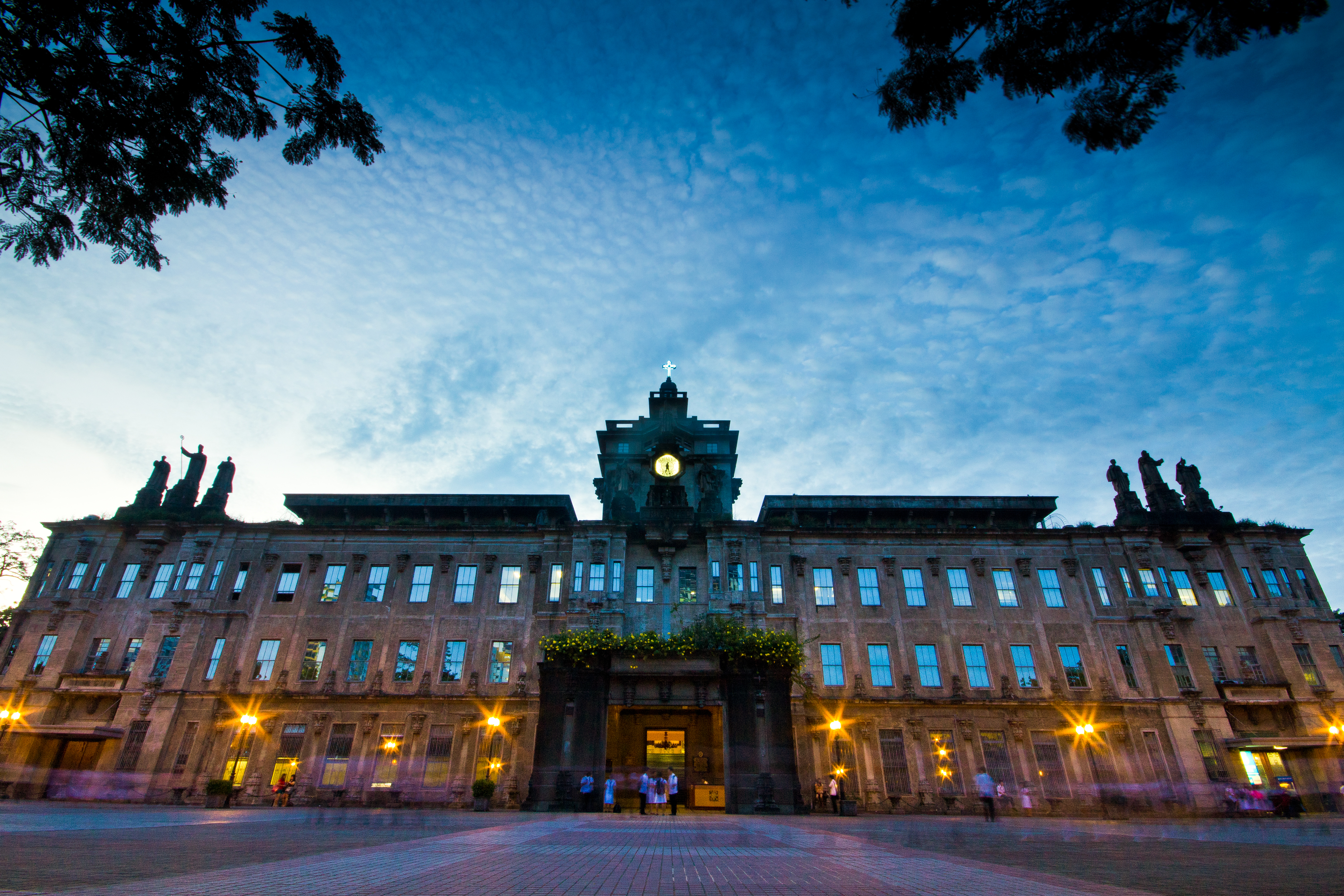
The UST, The oldest university in Asia.

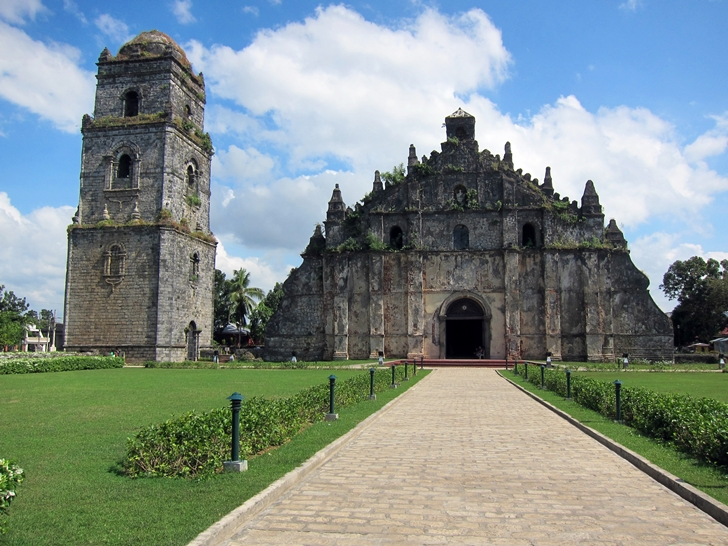
The Paoay Church in Ilocos Norte.

== 18th century ==
=== 1700s ===
Year	Date	Event	Source
1701	December 8	Domingo Zabálburu de Echevarri appointed Governor-General (1701–1709).	
1704		North Borneo is ceded by the sultan of Brunei to the sultan of Sulu.	
1709	August 25	Martín de Urzua y Arismendi appointed Governor-General (1709–1715).	

=== 1710s ===
Year	Date	Event	Source
1715	February 4	Jose Torralba appointed Governor-General (1715–1717) by the Audiencia Real.	
1717	August 9	Fernando Manuel de Bustillo Bustamante y Rueda appointed Governor-General (1717–1719).	
1718		Rivera Revolt (1718)	
1719	October 11	Archbishop Francisco de la Cuesta of Manila becomes acting Governor-General (1719–1721).	

=== 1720s ===
Year	Date	Event	Source
		Caragay Revolt (1719)	
1721	August 6	Toribio José Cosio y Campo appointed Governor-General (1721–1729).	
1722		Colegio de San Jose conferred with the title Royal.	
1729	August 14	Fernándo Valdés y Tamon appointed Governor-General (1729–1739).	

=== 1730s ===
Year	Date	Event	Source
1734	September 2	The Faculties of Civil Law and Canon Law of the University of Santo Tomas established by virtue of a royal cedula of Charles II of Spain	
1739	July	Gaspar de la Torre appointed Governor-General (1739–1745).	

=== 1740s ===
Year	Date	Event	Source
1744		Dagohoy Rebellion (1744–1829), the longest in country's history, wherein Bohol is proclaimed independent from the Spanish.	
1745	September 21	Archbishop Juan Arrechederra of Manila becomes acting Governor-General (1745–1750).	
1745		Agrarian Revolt (1745–1746)	

=== 1750s ===
Year	Date	Event	Source
1750	July 20	Jose Francisco de Obando y Solis appointed Governor-General (1750–1754).	
1754	May 15	Mt Taal emits magma and destroys the towns of Lipa, Sala, Tanauan and Talisay.	
1754	July 26	Pedro Manuel de Arandia Santisteban appointed Governor-General (1754–1759).	
1759	June	Miguel Lino de Ezpeleta appointed Governor-General (1759–1761).	

=== 1760s ===
Year	Date	Event	Source
1761	July	Archbishop Manuel Rojo del Rio y Vieyra of Manila appointed Governor-General (1761–1762).	
1762		Palaris Revolt (1762–1765)	
1762		Camarines Revolt (1762–1764)	
1762		Cebu Revolt (1762–1764)	
1762		British forces looted and plundered many of Manila establishments through the so-called Rape of Manila.	
1762		Rector Fr. Domingo Collantes of the University of Santo Tomas organizes four companies of university students to help in the defense of the city against the British Invasion of Manila	
1762	September 22	British fleet entered seizes Manila Bay as part of the Seven Years' War	
1762	October 5	Manila fell under the British rule; start of the British occupation.	
1762	October 6	Simón de Anda y Salazar appointed Governor-General (1762–17614) by the Real Audiencia. Provisional Government established in Bacolor, Pampanga with de Anda as dictator.	
1762	October 8	Gov. Gen. de Anda moves the seat of the Spanish government to Bacolor, Pampanga, becoming the temporary capital of the Philippines (1762–1764).	
1762	November 2	The British East India Company commissioned The Rt Hon. Dawsonne Drake became the first British governor-general of the Philippines until 1764.	
1762	November 14	Silang Revolt (1762–63)	
1763		Dabo and Marayac Revolt (1763)	
1763		Isabela Revolt (1763).	
1763	February 10	Treaty of Paris implicitly returns Manila to Spain.	
1763	May 28	Death of Diego Silang	
1763	September	Execution of Gabriela Silang, the only Filipina to have led a revolt	
1764	March 17	Simón de Anda y Salazar hands over the control of the colonial government to Francisco Javier de la Torre, newly appointed Governor-General (1764–1765)	
1764	June 11	The last of the British ships that sailed to Manila leaves the Philippines for India, ending the British occupation.	
1765	February 10	Royal Fiscal of Manila Don Francisco Léandro de Viana writes the famous letter to King Charles III of Spain, later called as "Viana Memorial of 1765". The document advised the king to abandon the colony due to the economic and social devastation created by the Seven Years' War. The suggestion was not heeded.	
1765	July 6	José Antonio Raón y Gutiérrez appointed Governor-General (1765–1770)	
1765		Governor Raon orders the minting of parallelogramic-shaped coins called barrillas, the first coined minted in the Philippines.	
1768	17 May	Royal decree banishing the Society of Jesus from Spain and the Spanish dominions reaches Manila	
1769	July 23	The Society of Jesus in the Philippines is expelled by Raón after receiving a dated later from Charles III's chief minister Don Pedro Pablo Abarca de Bolea on March 1, 1767. The Jesuit's Properties are confiscated by the Spanish Colonial Government	
1769		The closure of the Jesuit Universidad de San Ignacio leaves the University of Santo Tomas as the only institution of higher learning in the colony.	

=== 1770s ===
Year	Date	Event	Source
1770	July	Simón de Anda y Salazar appointed Governor-General (1770–1776)	
1771		Moro pirates traveled all over the country and raids many fishing villages in Manila Bay, Mariveles, Parañaque, Pasay and Malate.	
1773	July 21	Clement XIV suppresses the Society of Jesus in his papal brief Dominus ac Redemptor	
1774	November 9	Parishes secularized by order of King Charles III of Spain.	
1776	October 30	Pedro de Sarrio appointed Governor-General (1776–1778)	
1778	July	José Basco y Vargas appointed Governor-General (1778–1787)	

=== 1780s ===
Year	Date	Event	Source
1780		Real Sociedad Economica de los Amigos del Pais de Filipinas (Royal Economic Society of Friends of the Philippines) introduced in the Philippines to offer local and foreign scholarships and professorships to Filipinos, and financed trips of scientists from Spain to the Philippines	
1781		Charles III of Spain authorizes the University of Santo Tomas to prepare its own statutes, independent of those of the University of Mexico	(Note: Ever since its foundation in 1611, the University's constitution was based on that of the Real y Pontificia Universidad de Nueva España)
1783		Bishop Mateo Joaquin de Arevalo of Cebu establishes the Colegio-Seminario de San Carlos (later renamed as the University of San Carlos) from the old building of the defunct Colegio de San Ildefonso, which was closed down in 1769 after the suppression of the Jesuits.	
1783	June 26	An island group, which would be named Batanes, is annexed to the Philippines by the Spanish and is founded as a province called Provincia de la Concepcion.	
1785		Lagutao Revolt (1785).	
1785	May 20	University of Santo Tomas granted Royal Title by King Charles III of Spain.	
1787	September 22	Pedro de Sarrio appointed Governor-General (1787–1788)	
1788		Ilocos Norte Revolt (1788).	
1788	April 2	Birth of the greatest Tagalog poet from Bulacan Francisco "Balagtas" Baltazar.	
1788	July 1	Félix Berenguer de Marquina appointed Governor-General (1788–1793)	

=== 1790s ===
Year	Date	Event	Source
1793	September 1	Rafael María de Aguilar y Ponce de León appointed Governor-General (1793–1806)	

The IHS logo of the Society of Jesus.

== 19th century ==
=== 1800s ===
Year	Date	Event	Source
1805		Nueva Vizcaya Revolt (1805)	
1806	August 7	Mariano Fernández de Folgueras appointed Governor-General (1806–1810)	
1807	September 16	Ambaristo Revolt (1807)	
1808	May	French Emperor Napoleon Bonaparte installs his brother Joseph Bonaparte as King of Spain.	
1809	January 22	King Joseph Bonaparte gives Filipinos Spanish Citizenship and grants the colony representation in the Spanish Cortes	

=== 1810s ===
Year	Date	Event	Source
1810	March 4	Manuel Gonzalez de Aguilar appointed Governor-General (1806–1813)	
1811		Del Superior Govierno is established in Manila by Gov. Gen. Fernandez de Folgueras; the country's first newspaper lasted six months.	
1812	March 19	The Spanish Cortes promulgates the Cadiz Constitution	
1812	September 24	The first Philippine delegates to the Spanish Cortes, Pedro Perez de Tagle and Jose Manuel Coretto take their oath of office in Madrid, Spain.	
1813	March 17	The Cadiz Constitution implemented in Manila.	
1813	September 4	José Gardoqui Jaraveitia appointed Governor-General (1806–1816)	
1813	October 16	Napoleon is defeated in the Battle of the Nations near Leipzig	
1813	October	British General Duke of Wellington drives the Napoleonic forces out of Spain	
1814		Ferdinand VII proclaimed as King of Spain; Conservatives return to the Spanish Cortes	
1814	February 1	Mt. Mayon erupts, affecting Albay and leaving 1,200 dead.	
1815	June 18	Napoleon is defeated in Waterloo	
1815	October 15	Napoleon is exiled in St. Helena's Island	
1816		Cadiz Constitution is rejected by the conservative government and Filipino representation in the Spanish Cortes is abolished	
1816	December 10	Mariano Fernández de Folgueras appointed Governor-General (1816–1822)	
1818	February 2	A royal decree divides old Ilocos province into Ilocos Norte and Ilocos Sur.	

=== 1820s ===
Year	Date	Event	Source
1822	October 30	Juan Antonio Martinez appointed Governor-General (1822–1825)	
1825	October 14	Mariano Ricafort Palacín y Abarca appointed Governor-General (1825–1830)	
1828		Earthquake strikes Manila destroying many of its buildings	
1829	August 31	Dagohoy Revolt in Bohol ended.	

=== 1830s ===
Year	Date	Event	Source
1830	December 23	Pascual Enrile y Alcedo appointed Governor-General (1830–1835)	
1830		Manila is opened to the world market	
1835	March 1	Gabriel de Torres appointed Governor-General (1835)	
1835	April 23	Joaquín de Crámer appointed Governor-General (1835)	
1835	September 9	Pedro Antonio Salazar Castillo y Varona appointed Governor-General (1835)	
1835		Chamber of Commerce is formed	
1837	August 27	Andrés García Camba appointed Governor-General (1837–1838)	
1837		Manila is made an open port.	
1838	December 29	Luis Lardizábal appointed Governor-General (1838–1841)	
1838		Florante at Laura is published.	

=== 1840s ===
Year	Date	Event	Source
1841	February 14	Marcelino de Oraá Lecumberri appointed Governor-General (1841–1843)	
1841	August 11	Samar province (later Western Samar) is declared independent, separating from the provinces of Leyte and Cebu, through a decree issued by Queen Isabela III of Spain.	
1841	November 4	Apolinario Dela Cruz better known as Hermano Pule was executed.	
1843	June 17	Francisco de Paula Alcalá de la Torre appointed Governor-General (1843–1844)	
1844	July 16	Narciso Clavería y Zaldúa appointed Governor-General (1844–1849)	
1846	December 1	La Esperanza is established by Miguel Sanchez; the country's first daily newspaper lasted three years.	
1848		Diario de Manila, best edited newspaper, is published (1848–1899).	
1849	December 26	Antonio María Blanco appointed Governor-General (1849–1850)	

=== 1850s ===
Year	Date	Event	Source
1850	July 29	Antonio de Urbistondo y Eguía appointed Governor-General (1850–1853)	
1852	December 4	Glowing avalanche from Mt Hibok-Hibok.	
1853	December 20	Ramón Montero y Blandino appointed Governor-General (1853–1854)	
1854	February 2	Manuel Pavía y Lacy appointed Governor-General (1854)	
1854	October 28	Ramón Montero y Blandino appointed Governor-General (1854)	
1854	November 20	Manuel Crespo y Cebrían appointed Governor-General (1854)	
1856	December 5	Ramón Montero y Blandino appointed Governor-General (1856–1857)	
1857	January 12	Fernándo Norzagaray y Escudero appointed Governor-General (1857–1860)	
1859		Jesuits return to the Philippines	
1859		Jesuits takes over the Escuela Municipal and establishes the Ateneo Municipal	

=== 1860s ===
Year	Date	Event	Source
1860		The country's first Masonic lodge is founded in Cavite.	
1860	January 12	Ramón María Solano y Llanderal appointed Governor-General (1860)	
1860	August 29	Juan Herrera Davila appointed Governor-General (1860–1861)	
1861	February 2	José Lemery e Ibarrola Ney y González appointed Governor-General (1861–1862)	
1861	June 19	Birth of Jose Rizal, one of the country' national heroes	
1861		Escuela de Artes Y Oficios de Bacolor established as Asia's oldest vocational school.	
1862		El Pasig is published, a bilingual fortnightly paper, one of the first native newspapers.	
1862	July 7	Salvador Valdés appointed Governor-General (1862)	
1862	July 9	Rafaél de Echagüe y Bermingham appointed Governor-General (1862–1865)	
1863	June 3	An earthquake leaves Manila in ruins	
1863	November 30	Andres Bonifacio, founder of the Katipunan, was born.	
1864	July 23	Apolinario Mabini, the Brains of the Revolution, was born.	
1865		University of Santo Tomas made the center for public instruction throughout the Philippines by royal decree of Queen Isabella II of Spain.	
1865		Observatorio Meteorológico del Ateneo Municipal de Manila (Manila Observatory) established by the Jesuits	
1865	March 24	Joaquín del Solar e Ibáñez appointed Governor-General (1862–1865)	
1865	April 25	Juan de Lara e Irigoyen appointed Governor-General (1862–1865)	
1866	July 13	José Laureano de Sanz y Posse appointed Governor-General (1866)	
1866	September 21	Juan Antonio Osorio appointed Governor-General (1866)	
1866	September 27	Joaquín del Solar e Ibáñez appointed Governor-General (1866)	
1866	October 26	José de la Gándara y Navarro appointed Governor-General (1866–1869)	
1867		Colegio de Santa Isabel established in Naga by Bishop Francisco Gainza, OP of Nueva Caceres, through the royal decree of Queen Isabella II of Spain.	
1869	November 17	Suez Canal opened; shortening duration of travel from the Philippines to Europe.	
1869		Colegio de Santa Isabel inaugurated as the first Normal School in Southeast Asia	
1869	June 7	Manuel Maldonado appointed Governor-General (1869)	
1869	June 23	Carlos María de la Torre y Navacerrada appointed Governor-General (1869–1871)	

=== 1870s ===
Year	Date	Event	Source
1871		The Gabinete de Fisica of the University of Santo Tomas established as the first Museum in the Philippines.	
1871		The Faculty of Medicine and Pharmacy of the University of Santo Tomas is established as the first school of Medicine and Pharmacy in the Philippines.	
1871	April 4	Rafael de Izquierdo y Gutíerrez appointed Governor-General (1871–1873)	
1872	January 20	About 200 Filipinos stage a mutiny in Cavite.	
1872	February 17	Priests Mariano Gomez, José Apolonio Burgos, and Jacinto Zamora (together known as Gomburza) are implicated in the Cavite Mutiny and executed.	
1873	January 8	Manuel MacCrohon appointed Governor-General (1873)	
1873	January 24	Juan Alaminos y Vivar appointed Governor-General (1873–1874)	
1874	March 17	Manuel Blanco Valderrama appointed acting Governor-General (1874)	
1874	June 18	José Malcampo y Monje appointed Governor-General (1874–1877)	
1875		The Colegio de San Jose incorporated into the Faculty of Medicine and Pharmacy of the University of Santo Tomas.	
1875	September 18	Colegio de Santa Isabel (now a university) is established in present-day Camarines Sur province as the country's first normal school for girls.	
1877		Spanish colonial government conducts the first official national census in the country.	
1877	February 28	Domingo Moriones y Murillo appointed Governor-General (1877–1880)	
1878		Sabah is leased by the Sultan of Sulu to the British North Borneo Company.	

=== 1880s ===
Year	Date	Event	Source
1880	March 20	Rafael Rodríguez Arias appointed Governor-General (1880)	
1880	April 15	Fernando Primo de Rivera, 1st Marquis of Estella appointed Governor-General (1880–1883)(1st Term)	
1880		Manila is connected through telegraphic cable with Europe by Eastern Telecom.	
1880	July 18	Two shocks of an earthquake create destruction from Manila to Santa Cruz, Luguna. Tremors continue until Aug 6	
1882	March 3	Jose Rizal leaves for Spain to continue his medical studies	
1882	June 2	Jose Rizal begins writing the Noli Me Tangere	
1883	March 10	Emilio Molíns becomes acting Governor-General (1883). (First Term)	
1883	April 7	Joaquín Jovellar appointed Governor-General (1883–1885)	
1884		Required forced labor of 40 days a year is reduced to 15 days by the Spanish Colonial Government.	
1884	June 21	Rizal finishes his medical studies in Spain	
1885	April 1	Emilio Molíns becomes acting Governor-General (1885). (First Term)	
1885	April 4	Emilio Terrero y Perinat appointed Governor-General (1885–1888)	
1886	February 26	Establishment of the Audiencia Territorial de Cebu.	
1886	May 10	Felix Manalo, founder of Iglesia ni Cristo is born.	
1887	May 29	Noli Me Tangere published.	
1887	October	Rizal starts writing the El Filibusterismo	
1887		The Manila School of Agriculture is established.	
1888	March 1	A massive anti-friar demonstration took place in Manila (led by Doroteo Cortés, José A. Ramos, and Marcelo H. del Pilar)	
1888	March 10	Antonio Molto and Federico Lobaton became acting Governor-General (1888)	
1888		Valeriano Wéyler appointed Governor-General (1888–1891)	
1888	December 10	La Solidaridad established	
1888	December 12	A petition, seeking permission for a night school, is submitted by 21 young women of Malolos, Bulacan, to the Governor-General.	
1889		La Solidaridad is first published in Spain as the Propaganda Movement's organ.	
1889		El Ilocano is established; country's first local newspaper (1889–1896).	

=== 1890s ===
Year	Date	Event	Source
1891	March 28	Rizal finishes writing El Filibusterismo in Biarritz, France	
1891		El Filibusterismo published in Ghent, Belgium	
1891		Eulogio Despujol appointed Governor-General (1891–1893)	
1892		Diariong Tagalog is published; first native daily paper, lasted at least three months.	
1892	June 26	Rizal arrives in the Philippines from Europe via Hong Kong	
1892	July 3	Rizal forms the La Liga Filipina	
1892	July 7	Rizal is arrested for establishing the La Liga Filipina	
1892	July 7	Andres Bonifacio secretly established the Katipunan.	
1892	July 7	Rizal is exiled to Dapitan	
1892	September 23	Filipino painter Juan Luna shot dead his wife Paz Pardo De Tavera.	
1892	November 24	Ferrocaril de Manila-Dagupan is opened, country's first railroad line with route of Manila–Dagupan, the forerunner of the Philippine National Railways.	
1893		El Hogar is established; country's first publication for and by women.	
1893	March 10	Federico Ochando becomes acting Governor-General (1893)	
1893		Ramón Blanco appointed Governor-General (1893–1896)	
1894	July 8	Bonifacio forms the Katipunan	
1894	October 17	Sorsogon province was separated from Albay province.	
1895		First local (municipal) elections	
1895	April 12	Recorded "earliest" day of celebration of independence, when Andres Bonifacio and other Katipuneros go to Pamitinan Cave in Montalban (now Rodriguez), Rizal to initiate new Katipunan members.	
1896		Republic of Kakarong de Sili is established in Pandi, Bulacan.	
1896	July 1	Rizal is recruited as a physician for the Spanish Army in Cuba by Governor Ramon Blanco	
1896	August 6	Rizal returns to Manila from Cuba	
1896	August 19	Katipunan is discovered by the Spanish authorities. Katipuneros flee to Balintawak	
1896	August 23	Revolution is proclaimed by Bonifacio at the Cry of Balintawak. Katipuneros tear up their cedulas	
1896	August 26	Andres Bonifacio, Emilio Jacinto and other Katipuneros board Rizal's ship to Barcelona. They offer his rescue but Rizal refused	
1896	August 30	Revolutionary Battle at San Juan del Monte. Governor Ramon Blanco proclaims a state of war in Manila, Laguna, Cavite, Batangas, Pampanga, Bulacan, Tarlac and Nueva Ecija.	
1896	August 30	Battle of San Juan del Monte took place.	
1896	September 2	Rizal Boards the ship Isla de Panay for Barcelona	
1896	September 2	Gen. Mariano Llanera leads the Filipino revolutionaries in a three-day battle against the Spanish forces in San Isidro, Nueva Ecija.	
1896	September 4	Four members of Katipunan involved in the Battle of San Juan del Monte, were executed on the Campo de Bagumbayan.	
1896	September 12	Thirteen Filipinos were executed in Plaza de Armas in the town of Cavite.	
1896	October 3	Rizal arrives at Barcelona	
1896	October 4	Rizal is imprisoned in Montjuich by order of Capt. Gen. Despujo	
1896	October 6	Rizal returns to Manila as a prisoner	
1896	October 31	A new group of the Katipunan is formed in Cavite headed by Emilio Aguinaldo	
1896	October 31	Emilio Aguinaldo issues his manifestos in Kawit, Cavite, declaring the aim of the revolution and announcing the formation of a central revolutionary committee for the municipal government.	
1896	November 11	Filipino forces, under Emilio Aguinaldo, defeat the Spaniards in a battle in Kawit, Cavite.	
1896	November 13	Rizal arrives in Manila and is incarcerated in Fort Santiago	
1896	November 20	Rizal is interrogated for charges against the Spanish Colonial Government	
1896	December 13	Camilo Polavieja becomes acting Governor-General (1896–1897)	
1896	December 30	Rizal is executed at Bagumbayan.	
1897	January 1	Some 3,000 Filipino fighters die in an attack by the Spanish soldiers against revolutionaries under Gen. Eusebio Roque in Pandi, Bulacan.	
1897	January 4	Eleven of the 15 Filipinos of Bicol were executed at the Luneta in Manila	
1897	January 11	Thirteen La Liga Filipina members are executed at Luneta, Manila.	
1897	February 6	Katipunan leader Roman Basa and eight members are executed in Bagumbayan.	
1897	February 17	Battle of Zapote Bridge	
1897	March 22	The Katipunan creates a revolutionary government and holds its election, during Tejeros Convention in Cavite, said to be the first election ever held in country's electoral history. Emilio Aguinaldo is elected as president.	
1897	March 23	Nineteen Filipinos of Kalibo, Aklan were executed	
1897	April 15	José de Lachambre becomes acting Governor-General (1897)	
1897	April 18	Dissenters from the Tejeros Convention election results concluded the Naic Military Agreement	
1897	April 23	Fernando Primo de Rivera appointed Governor-General (1897–1898)	
1897	April 29	Katipuneros arrest Andres Bonifacio and his brothers Procopio and Ciriaco on orders of Aguinaldo with sedition and treason before a military court of the Katipunan.	
1897	May 8	The Katipunan convicts and sentences Bonifacio brothers to death	
1897	May 10	Andres Bonifacio and his brothers are executed at Mt. Buntis, Maragondon, Cavite.	
1897	May 31	Aguinaldo establishes a Philippine republican government in Biak-na-Bato, San Miguel, Bulacan.	
1897	August 10	Aguinaldo begins negotiating with the Spaniards colonial government in Manila with Pedro Paterno as representative.	
1897	August 15	A 7.9 intensity estimated earthquake hits Luzon's northwest coast	
1897	November 1	Constitution of Biak-na-Bato is promulgated by the revolutionaries, including Aguinaldo.	
1897	December 14	Pact of Biak-na-Bato, between Filipinos (Aguinaldo) and Spaniards (Gov. Primo de Rivera), signed.	
1897	December 27	Aguinaldo is self-exiled to Hong Kong following the Pact of Biak-na-Bato	
1898		The only issue of Katipunan#Kalayaan, the official organ of the Katipunan, is published.	
1898		The American Soldier and The Soldier's Letter are published; first English language newspapers.	
1898		Official Gazette is established by the civil government.	
1898	February 8	The Katipunan is revived by Emilio Jacinto and Feliciano Jocson	
1898	March 25	A revolutionary government in Candon, Ilocos Sur is established by Don Isabelo Abaya as he starts Cry of Candon.	
1898	April 3	Pantaleon Villegas (Leon Kilat) leads a battle against Spanish forces in present-day Cebu City; said to be the start of the revolution in Cebu province.	
1898	April 11	Basilio Augustín appointed Governor-General (1898)	
1898	April 14	Local Katipunan members under Ildefonso Moreno conduct an uprising against Spanish colonizers in Daet town.	
1898	April 17	A provisional government is established by Gen. Francisco Macabulos, with its own constitution signed; lasts about a month.	
1898	April 24	Aguinaldo meets American Consul, Mr. Pratt, at Singapore.	
1898	April 26	Aguinaldo goes to Hong Kong.	
1898	April 26	The US declares war on Spain.	
1898	May 1	Commodore George Dewey attacks Manila	
1898	May 19	Aguinaldo and his companions return to Cavite Province from exile in Hong Kong.	
1898	May 24	Aguinaldo proclaims a dictatorial government and issues two decrees which show his trust and reliance in US protection	
1898	May 28	Filipino revolutionaries defeat the Spanish forces in a battle in Alapan, Imus, Cavite, with the first unfurling of the Philippine flag.	
1898	June 12	Philippine Independence from Spain is declared by Filipino revolutionaries, led by Pres. Aguinaldo, in Kawit, Cavite.	
1898	June 23	Aguinaldo changes the dictatorial government to revolutionary government.	
1898	June 27	Over 50 Spanish soldiers begin to hide themselves at a church in Baler town, in what would be their last stand in the country against the revolutionaries.	
1898	July 15	Aguinaldo creates a cabinet	
1898	July 15	The Malolos Congress in established	
1898	July 17	US reinforcements and troops arrive in the Philippines.	
1898	July 22	Pangasinan Province is liberated from the Spanish.	
1898	July 24	Fermín Jáudenes becomes acting Governor-General (1898)	
1898	August 13	Francisco Rizzo becomes acting Governor-General (1898)	
1898	August 13	Wesley Merritt appointed Military Governor (1898)	
1898	August 14	The Spanish surrender to the U.S., which took Manila.	
1898	August 22	Revolutionary government headquarters is transferred from Bacoor, Cavite to Malolos, Bulacan through a decree issued by Pres. Aguinaldo.	
1898	August 29	Elwell S. Otis appointed Military Governor (1898–1900)	
1898	September	Diego de los Ríos becomes acting Governor-General (1898)	
1898	September 15	Delegates of what would be known as the Malolos Congress convene at Barasoain Church in Malolos, Bulacan to draft a Constitution for the country.	
1898	September 29	The Malolos Congress meets and elects its officers; ratifies the Declaration of Independence proclaimed on June.	
1898	September 29	El Horado de la Revolucion, the official publication of the Malolos Congress, publishes its first issue.	
1898	October 11	The Manila Times is founded by Thomas Cowan and publishes its first issue; the country's oldest running broadsheet; its first incarnation lasted 32 years.	
1898	October 15	The American is published by Franklyn Brooks; second English language daily paper.	
1898	October 19	Universidad Literaria de Filipinas is established in Malolos, Bulacan through a presidential decree.	
1898	October 24	Enrique Mendiola founds a college school for boys, the Burgos Institute, in Malolos, Bulacan.	
1898	October 25	Establishment of Academia Militar, country's first military training school that lasted for less than a year.	
1898	November 5	A revolutionary movement under Gen. Aniceto Lacson and Gen. Juan Araneta proclaims the Republic of Negros in Bago town.	
1898	November 7	Revolutionary forces promulgates a constitution for the Republic of Negros and declare Gen. Lacson as president.	
1898	November 17	Provisional revolutionary government of the Visayas is organized in Santa Barbara town upon liberation of the majority of Iloilo province, with Roque Lopez elected president; Cry of Santa Barbara occurs.	
1898	November 22	Town of San Jose in Antique is captured from Spanish forces by revolutionaries under Leandro Fullon, who established a provincial government.	
1898	November 29	Malolos Congress approves its draft Constitution.	
1898	December 10	Spain and the U.S. sign the Treaty of Paris. Article III provides for the cession of the Philippines to the U.S. by Spain and the payment of 20 million dollars to Spain by the US.	
1898	December 21	US president McKinley issues the Benevolent Assimilation Proclamation	
1898	December 23	Pres. Aguinaldo signs the Malolos Constitution.	
1898	December 24	Gov. Gen. de los Rios surrenders the town of Iloilo to revolutionary forces under Gen. Martin Delgado.	
1899	January 20	U.S. Pres. McKinley appoints the first Philippine Commission, known as the Schurman Commission	
1899	January 21	The Malolos Constitution is promulgated by Aguinaldo.	
1899	January 23	The Malolos Republic (First Republic) government, Asia's first republic, is inaugurated at Barasoain Church in Malolos, Bulacan; Emilio Aguinaldo takes his oath of office as the first president of the Philippines.	
1899	February 4	Hostilities break out between the Filipino and U.S. forces.	
1899	February 6	The US Senate ratifies the Treaty of Paris with Spain	
1899	March 3	La Justicia, Cebu province's first Filipino-owned newspaper, publishes its first issue.	
1899	March 4	The Schurman Commission arrives in Manila	
1899	April 23	Filipino forces under Gen. Gregorio del Pilar defeated the Americans in an encounter in Quingua (now Plaridel), Bulacan.	
1899	May 6	Aguinaldo creates a new cabinet	
1899	May 6	The country's first municipal election is held in Baliuag, Bulacan.	
1899	May 12	Filipino troops, led by Emilio Aguinaldo, recapture the Calumpit and Baliwag towns from the Americans.	
1899	May 18	General Vicente Alvarez establishes the Republic of Zamboanga.	
1899	May 20	Aguinaldo's moves face opposition from Apolinario Mabini and Antonio Luna	
1899	June 2	Siege of Baler ends after 11 months, with 35 surviving Spanish soldiers surrendered.	
1899	June 5	Antonio Luna killed	
1899	October 11	Pres. Aguinaldo moves the seat of government from San Isidro, Nueva Ecija to Tarlac Province.	
1899	December 2	Gregorio Del Pilar killed in the Battle of Tirad Pass.	
1899	December 4	An American base is attacked by the Filipinos in Vigan, Ilocos Sur.	

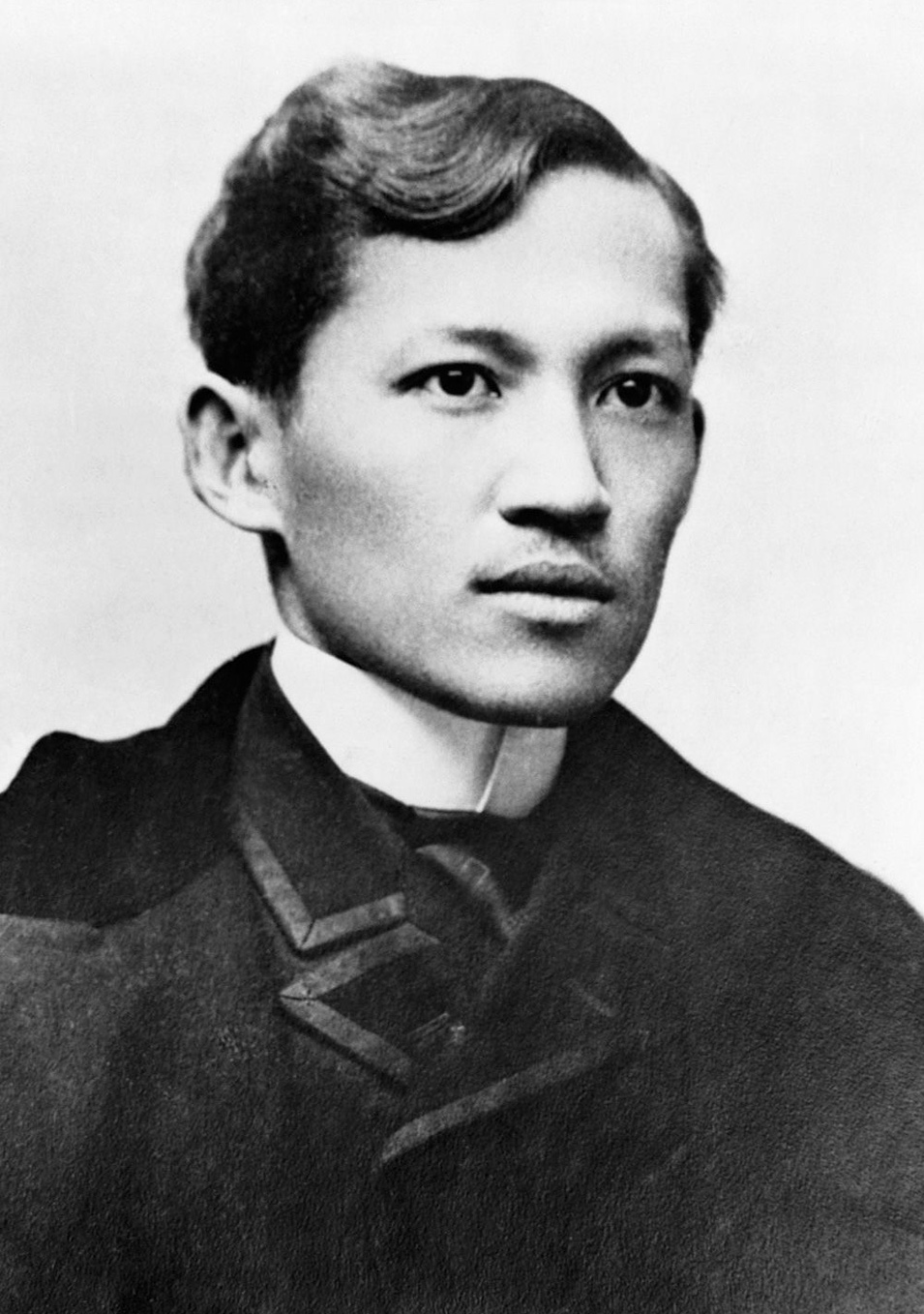
Dr. Jose Rizal.

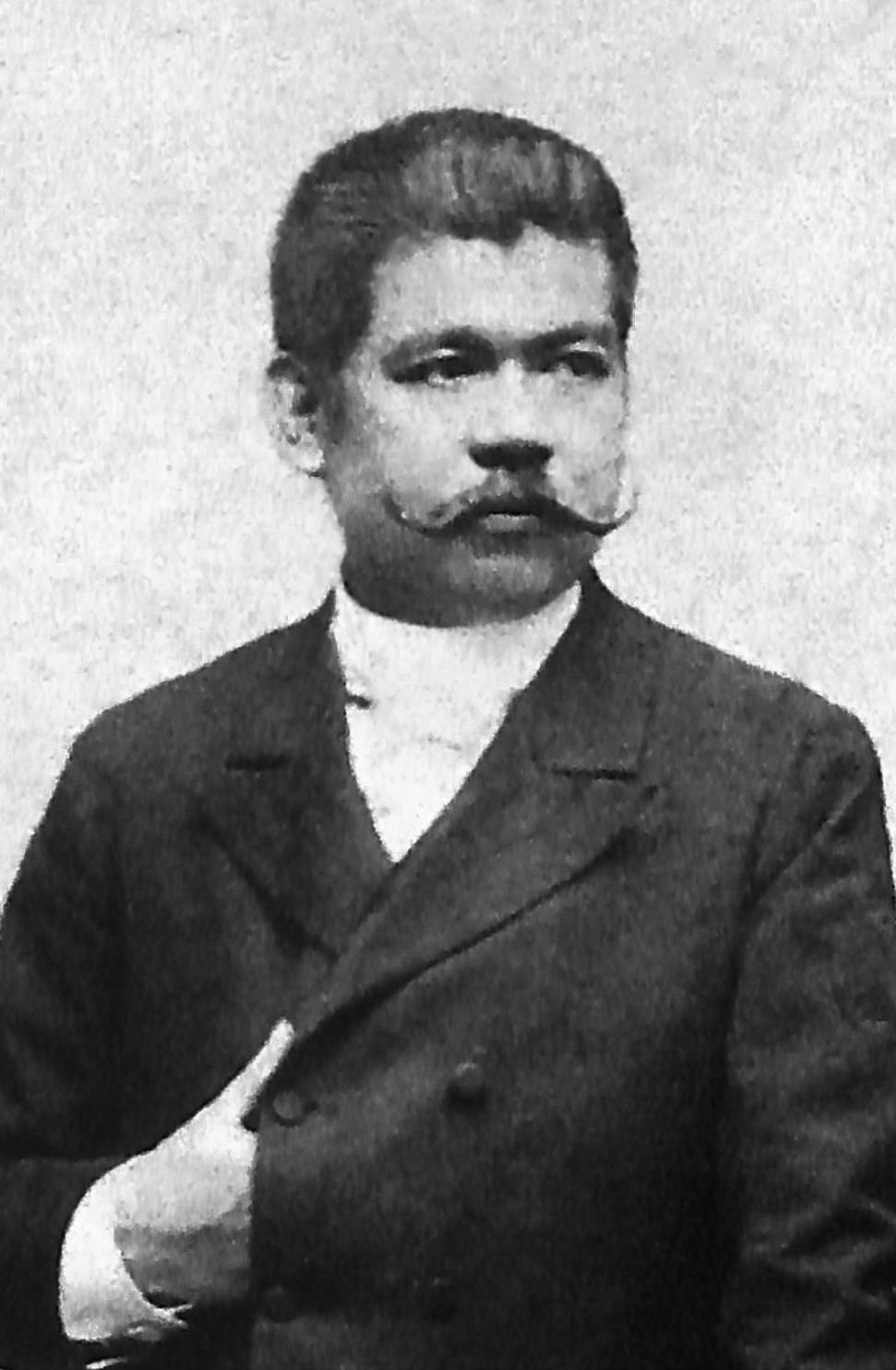
Marcelo H. del Pilar, one of the leaders of the Propaganda Movement in Spain.

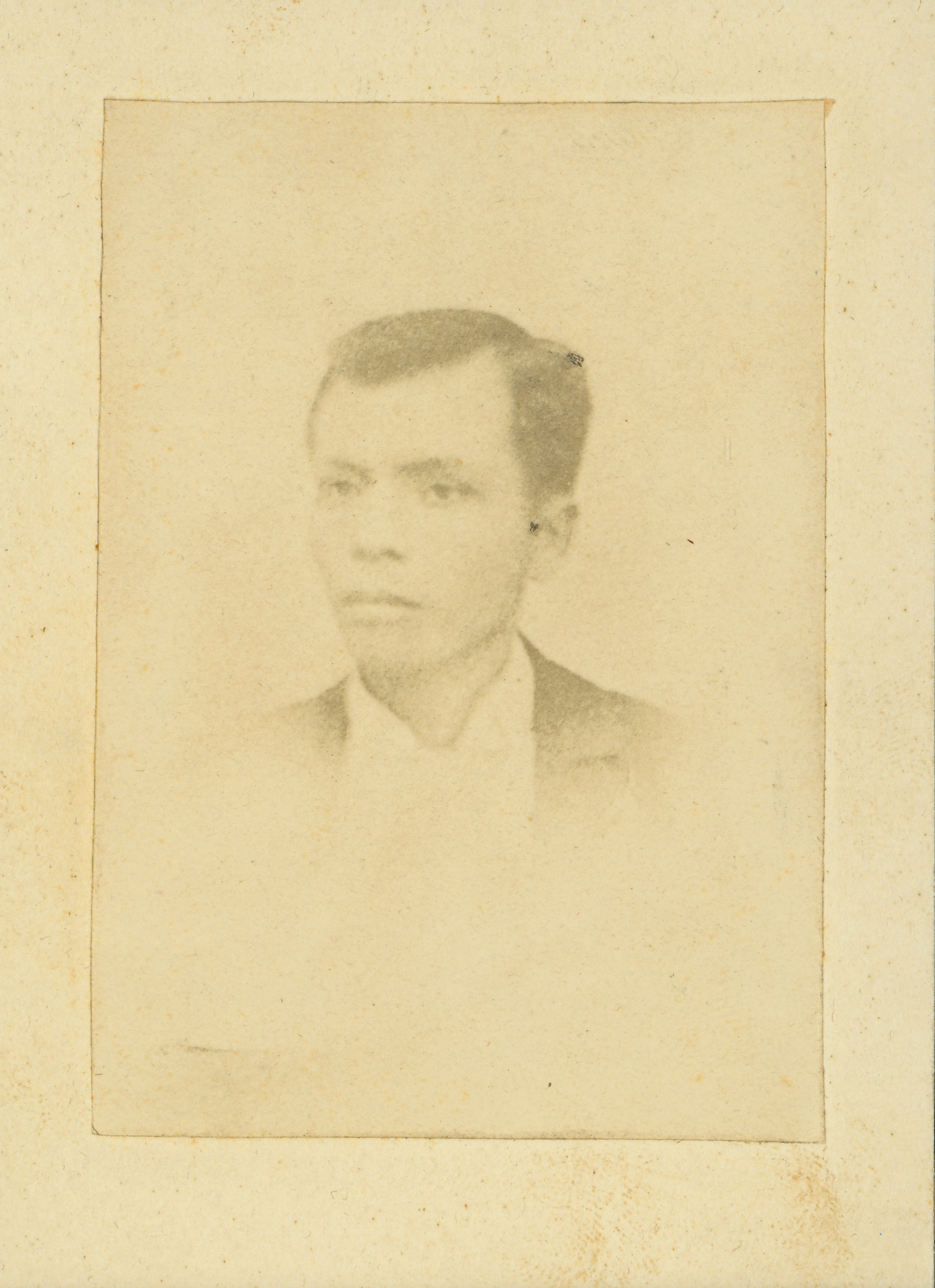
The single known extant photograph of Andres Bonifacio, the founder of Katipunan and leader of the Philippine Revolution.

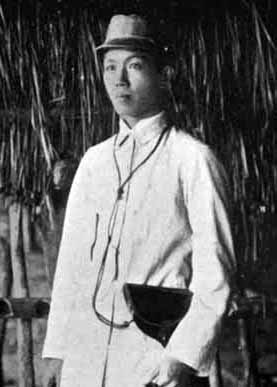
General Emilio Aguinaldo, First president of the Philippines.

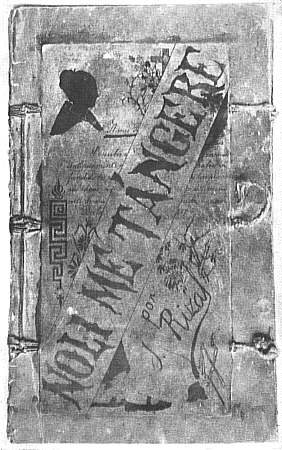
The original front cover of Noli Me Tángere.

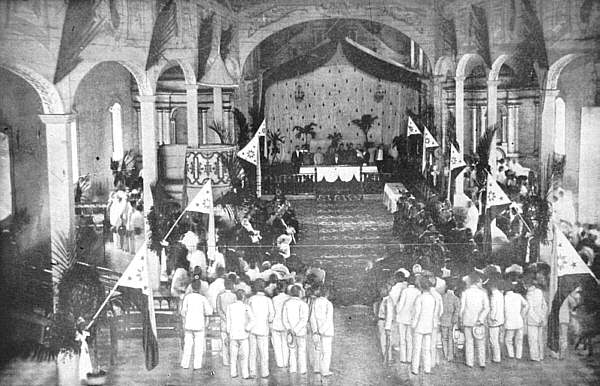
The Malolos Congress.

The Three Stars and a Sun design was formally unfurled during the Proclamation of Philippine Independence and the flag of the First Philippine Republic, on June 12, 1898, by President Aguinaldo.

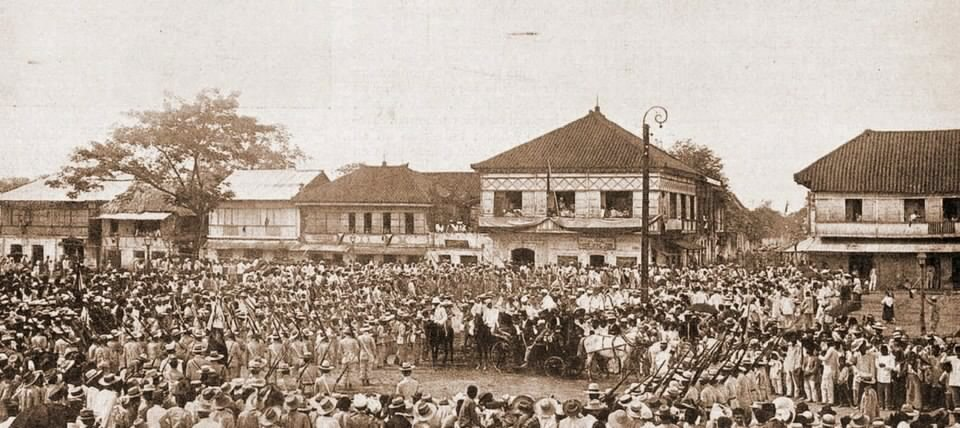
Marching Filipino soldiers during the inauguration of the First Philippine Republic in Malolos on January 23, 1899.

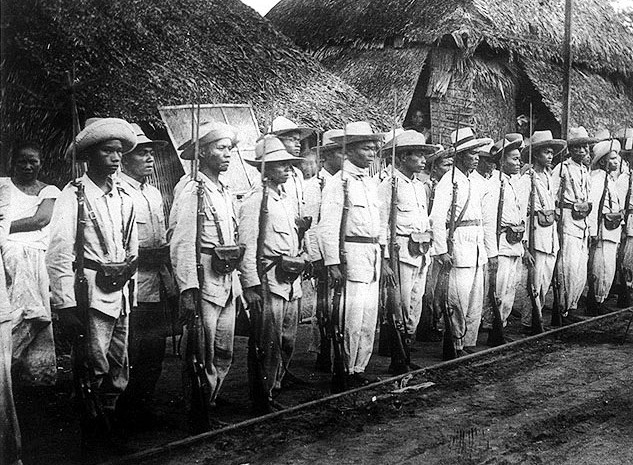
The soldiers of Philippine Revolutionary Army.

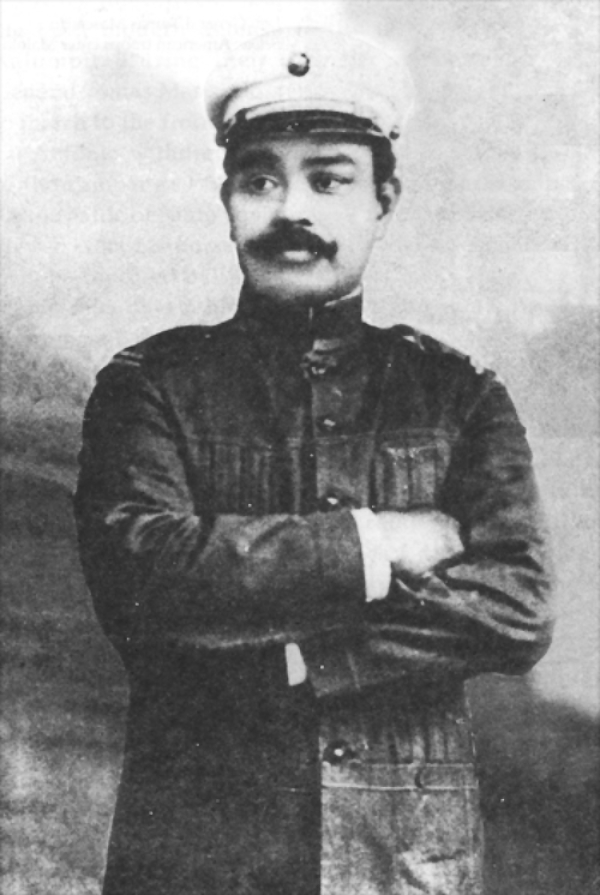
Antonio Luna, Regarded as one of the fiercest generals of his time, he succeeded Artemio Ricarte as Chief of Staff of the Armed Forces of the Philippines.

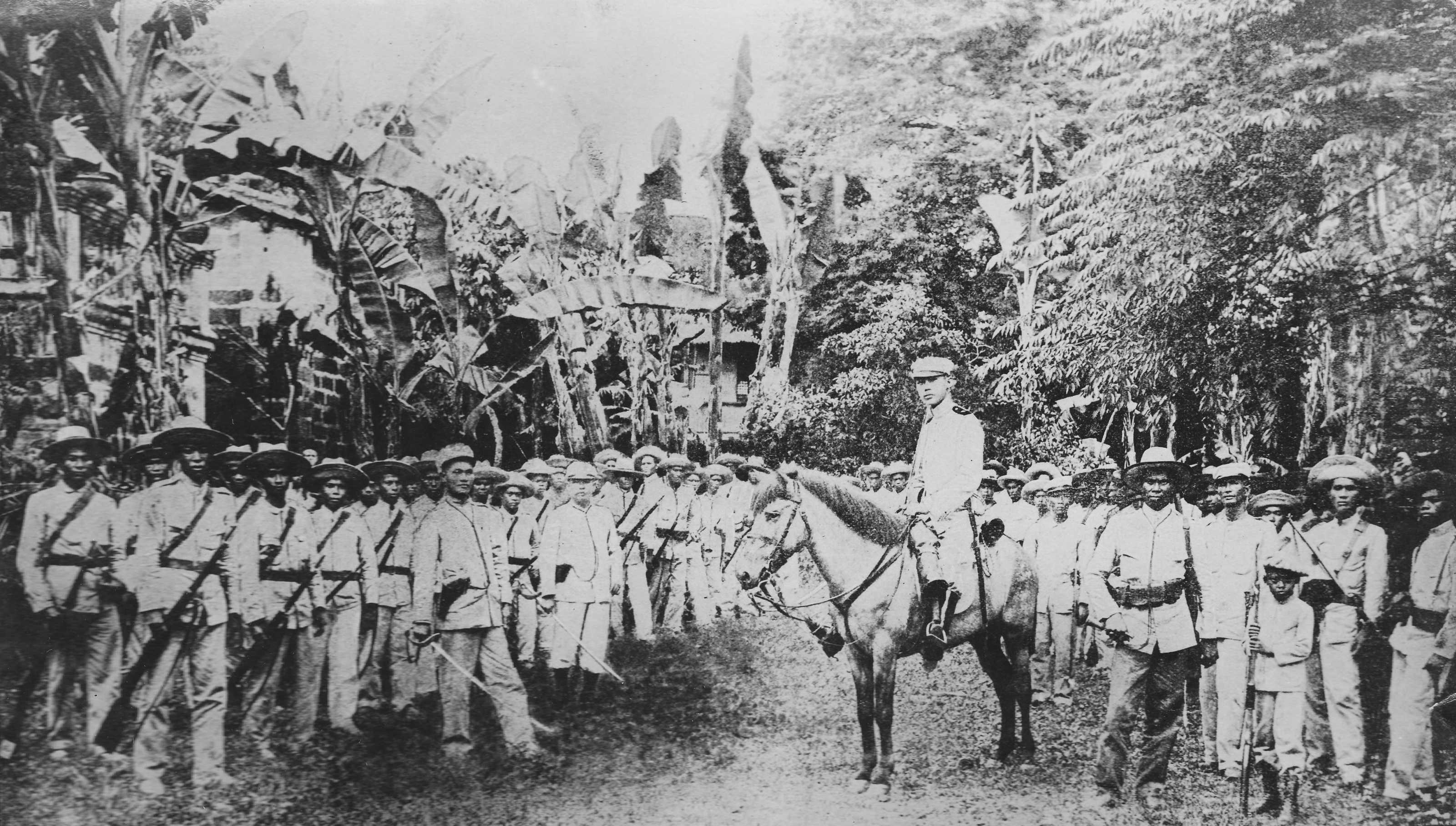
General Gregorio del Pilar and his troops in Pampanga, around 1898 (Philippine–American War).

== 20th century ==
=== 1900s ===
Year	Date	Event	Source
1900	January 21	The Schurman Commission returns to the U.S.	
1900	February 2	Manila Bulletin is founded as a shipping journal by Carson Taylor, an American, and publishes its first issue.	
1900	March 16	U.S. Pres. McKinley appoints the second Philippine Commission, known as the Taft Commission	
1900	March	American forces capture Bohol.	
1900	April	Battle of Cagayan de Misamis	
1900	April	Siege of Catubig	
1900	May 5	Arthur MacArthur, Jr appointed Military Governor (1900–1901)	
1900	May	Battle of Agusan Hill	
1900	June	Battle of Makahambus Hill	
1900	June 3	The Taft Commission arrives in Manila	
1900	July 31	Filipino revolutionaries defeat American troops in a battle in Boac, Marinduque, said to be the first recorded armed encounter between two forces.	
1900	August 20	Pres. Aguinaldo orders the start of attack against American forces in northern Luzon.	
1900	September	Battle of Pulang Lupa	
1900	September	Battle of Mabitac	
1900	December 23	Partido Liberal established	
1901	March 2	The Army Appropriation Act, also known as the Spooner Amendment, is passed by the US Senate.	
1901	March 23	Pres. Aguinaldo is captured by US authorities in Palanan town.	
1901	April 1	Aguinaldo takes an oath of allegiance to the US.	
1901	April 15	Gov. Taft inaugurates the provincial government of Capiz. (Phil. Commission Act No. 115)	
1901	June 11	Establishment of Rizal Province by the second Philippine Commission, upon unification of then provinces of Manila and Morong. (Act No. 137)	
1901	June 17	El Colegio de San Beda established	
1901	July 1	End of insurrection declared	
1901	July 4	Adna Chaffee appointed as the last US Military Governor (1901–1902)	
1901	July 4	A civil government is established in the Philippines with William Howard Taft as the first Civil Governor (1901–1904)	
1901	July 18	The US organizes the Philippine Constabulary	
1901	August 28	Silliman Institute, later known as Silliman University, is established as the first American university in the Philippines.	
1901	September	The first Filipino members of the second Philippine Commission are appointed	
1901	September 28	Guerillas, headed by the Filipino Captain Eugenio Daza, attack the U.S. military barracks in Balangiga, Samar; Americans' "worst single defeat."	
1901	September 29	Balangiga massacre occurs	
1901	October 20	A U.S. Marine battalion arrives on Samar to conduct the March across Samar operation	
1901	October 29	The president of the United States creates the position of provincial vice governor in the country, under the Spooner Amendment.	
1901	November 4	The Philippine Commission enacts the Sedition Act	
1901	December 14	An earthquake estimated of magnitude 7.8 shakes Lucena City.	
1902	January	The first labor union of The Country, Union de Litografose Impresores de Filipinas, is organized.	
1902	January 21	The Philippine Commission calls for the organization of Public Schools in the Philippines.	
1902	March 30	The US Marines leave Balangiga	
1902	April 16	General Miguel Malvar surrenders to the US forces	
1902	May	Governor Taft negotiates with Pope Leo XIII the sale of the friar lands in the Philippines	
1902	May 2	Macario Sakay establishes a second Tagalog Republic.	
1902	June	Mindoro and Lubang islands are annexed to Marinduque province.	
1902	July 1	The Philippine Organic Act was enacted.	
1902	July 1	Cooper Act is passed by the US Senate. Philippine Assembly is established	
1902	July 4	Americans proclaim the end of the Philippine–American War, however fighting continues	
1902	August 3	The foundation of Iglesia Filipina Independiente separated from Roman Catholic Church was proclaimed by the Union Obrera Democratica with Gregorio Aglipay as the 1st Obispo Maximo	
1902	September 17	Pope Leo XIII formally bestows a Pontifical title on the University of Santo Tomas	
1902	November 10	Marinduque province is annexed to Tayabas province (now Quezon). (Act No. 499)	
1902	November 12	Bandolerism Act passed by the Philippine Commission. All armed resistance against US rule are considered banditry	
1903		Governor Taft enunciates the policy of The Philippines for the Filipinos	
1903	May 1	Thousands of members of the Union Obrera Democratica Filipina, led by Dominador Gomez, stage a massive rally aiming for workers' rights as well as a public holiday for May 1.	
1903	June 1	Establishment of the Moro Province, consisting of the districts of Jolo, Lanao, Cotabato, Davao and Zamboanga.	
1904	February 1	Luke Edward Wright appointed as Civil Governor (1904–1905)	
1904	October 19	The Manila Business School was founded and started its operation (later as the Philippine School of Commerce, 1908, then as the Philippine College of Commerce, 1952, and now the Polytechnic University of the Philippines).	
1904	November 16	Iwahig Prison and Penal Farm is established in Palawan, country's oldest and largest open prison.	
1905	November 3	Henry Clay Ide appointed as Civil Governor (1905–1906)	
1906	May 27	Establishment of Culion Leper Colony in Culion Island in Palawan.	
1906	September 20	James Francis Smith appointed as Civil Governor (1906–1909)	
1906	December 3	St. Scholastica's College in Manila is established by the Missionary Benedictine Sisters of Tutzing.	
1907	June 3	Centro Escolar University established as Centro Escolar de Señoritas.	
1907	June 30	First congressional elections held	
1907	September 13	Macario Sakay is executed by hanging, ending his Tagalog Republic.	
1907	October 7	The Pontifical Coronation of Our Lady of La Naval de Manila	
1907	October 10	A law (Act No. 1761) that restricts and regulates the use and sale of dangerous drugs is signed.	
October 16	The First Philippine Assembly is inaugurated and convened.		
1908	June 18	The University of the Philippines is established in Manila.	
1908	August 29	Philippines Free Press is founded by Judge W.A. Kincaid and publishes its first issue in magazine format.	
1909	March 6	Present-day University of the Philippines Los Baños in Laguna is established, first autonomous UP campus.	

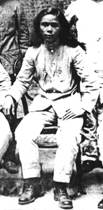
Macario Sakay, the unofficial President of the Tagalog Republic.

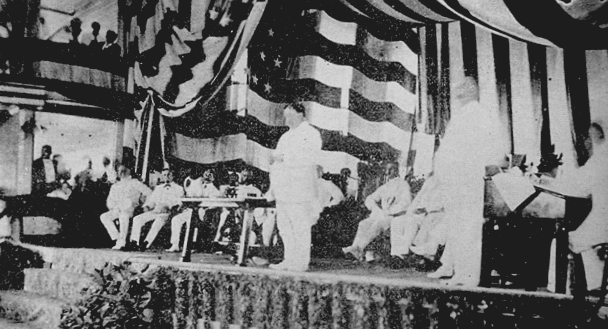
First Philippine Assembly.

=== 1910s ===
Year	Date	Event	Source
1911	January 27	Mt Taal erupts, and kills 1,334 people	
1911	June 16	De La Salle University-Manila is founded as De La Salle College by the Brothers of Christian Schools.	
1912		A silent movie about Jose Rizal is the first Filipino movie introduced in the Philippines.	
1913	June	Battle of Bud Bagsak	
1913	September 1	Newton W. Gilbert appointed as acting Civil Governor (1913)	
1913	October 6	Francis Burton Harrison appointed as Civil Governor (1913–1921)	
1914	July 27	Iglesia ni Cristo (largest independent church in Asia) is registered to the government.	
1916	October 16	The Jones Act is passed establishing an all-Filipino legislature	
1916	October 16	Manuel Quezon elected Senate President while Sergio Osmeña is elected as House Speaker of the House of Representatives of the Commonwealth of the Philippines	
1917	January 11	The first cabinet of Filipinos under the US regime is organized.	
1917	March 9	Provincehood of Abra (Act No. 2683)	
1917	March 10	An Act Amending the Administrative Code (Act No. 2711) reorganizes the territories in the Philippines, consisting of: Forty-two organized provinces: Abra, Albay, Antique, Bataan, Batanes, Batangas, Bohol, Bulacan, Cagayan, Camarines Norte, Camarines Sur, Capiz, Cavite, Cebu, Ilocos Norte, Ilocos Sur, Iloilo, Isabela, Laguna, La Union, Leyte, Marinduque, Masbate, Mindoro, Oriental Misamis, Occidental Misamis, Mountain Province, Nueva Ecija, Nueva Vizcaya, Occidental Negros, Oriental Negros, Pangasinan, Pampanga, Palawan, Rizal, Romblon, Samar, Sorsogon, Surigao, Tarlac, Tayabas and Zambales.; Provinces under Department of Mindanao and Sulu: Agusan, Bukidnon, Cotabato, Davao, Lanao, Sulu, and Zamboanga.; City of Manila, with separate jurisdiction.	
1919	September 19	The silent film Dalagang Bukid by José Nepomuceno was released, the first film to be produced locally.	

=== 1920s ===
Year	Date	Event	Source
1920		Mountain Province is established by American colonial government.	
1920	February 21	Provincehood of Marinduque (Act No. 2880), separating from Tayabas.	
1920	August	Philippines Herald is established by Manuel L. Quezon and former Manila Times journalists; first pro-Filipino nationalist newspaper.	
1920	December 15	Provincehood of Masbate (Act No. 2934), former sub-province independent from Sorsogon.	
1921	March 5	Charles Yeater appointed as acting Civil Governor (1921)	
1921	October 14	Leonard Wood appointed as Civil Governor (1921–1927)	
1922		Mrs. Redgrave pioneers the radio broadcasting from Nichols Field, only for a test broadcast.	
1922	June	Henry Hermann, owner of an electrical supply company, begins operating three radio stations in Manila and Pasay, also for their test broadcasts.	
1924	October 4	Radio Corporation of the Philippines (RCP) acquires radio station KZKZ, which begins its broadcast by Hermann earlier that year, replacing experimental stations; broadcast ceased in 1925 upon merger of Far Eastern Radio with RCP.	
1927	August 7	Eugene Allen Gilmore appointed as acting Civil Governor (1927)	
1927	December 27	Henry L. Stimson appointed as Civil Governor (1927–1929)	
1929		RCP operates its first radio station outside Manila, also first provincial station in the country, with KZRC (Radio Cebu) in Cebu, experimental station originally a relay station of KZRM in Manila.	
1929	February 23	Eugene Allen Gilmore appointed as acting Civil Governor (1929)	
1929	July 8	Dwight F. Davis appointed as Civil Governor (1929–1932)	
1929	November 2	Old Misamis is divided into the new provinces of Misamis Occidental and Misamis Oriental. (Act No. 3537; amended by Act No. 3777 on November 28, 1930).	

=== 1930s ===
Year	Date	Event	Source
1930	November 7	Partido Komunista ng Pilipinas (PKP, Communist Party of the Philippines) is formally established by Crisanto Evangelista at Tondo, Manila.	
1932	January 9	George C. Butte appointed as acting Civil Governor (1932)	
1932	January 21	Davao Prison and Penal Farm in present-day Davao del Norte is established (Act No. 3732); country's first penal settlement.	
1932	February 29	Theodore Roosevelt Jr. appointed as Civil Governor (1932–1933)	
1932	October 26	The Communist Party of the Philippines is declared illegal by the Supreme Court	
1933	July 15	Frank Murphy appointed as the last Civil Governor of the Philippines (1933–1935)	
1933	October 29	Partido Sakdal formed.	
1933	December 7	Governor-General Frank Murphy granted the Right of Suffrage to the Filipino women.	
1934	March 24	The Tydings-McDuffie Law, known as the Philippine Independence Law, is approved by U.S. President Roosevelt.	
1934	May 7	A pearl, which would be one of the world's largest, is found in Palawan.	
1934	July 10	202 delegates are elected to the Constitutional Convention in accordance with the Tydings-McDuffie Act	
1934	July 30	The Philippine Constitutional Convention is inaugurated	
1934	November 3	Bannawag, Ilocos region's weekly vernacular magazine, established.	
1935	February 8	The Constitutional Convention creates a new constitution	
1935	February 15	The Philippine Constitution is signed	
1935	May 2	Sakdalista uprising against the Philippine Constabulary fails with at least 60 members dead.	
1935	May 14	The Philippine electorate ratifies the Constitution in a referendum	
1935	September 17	Manuel Quezon elected president in the first Philippine presidential elections	
1935	November 15	The Philippine Commonwealth is inaugurated	
1935	November 15	The Office of Civil Governor is abolished	
1935	December 21	The National Defense Act of 1935 that created the Armed Forces of the Philippines was signed.	
1936	March 25	President Manuel L. Quezon issued Executive Order No. 23 which provided for the technical description and specifications of the Philippine national flag.	
1936	October 31	The Boy Scouts of the Philippines was established.	
1937	February 3–7	The 33rd International Eucharistic Congress was held in Rizal Park, Manila; first in Asia.	
1937	November 9	The Institute of National Language recommends Tagalog as the basis of the country's national language.	
1939	July 15	KZRH, established by H. E. Heacock Company under Samuel Caches, goes on air; country's oldest existing radio station, renamed PIAM during the Japanese era and now DZRH.	

=== 1940s ===
Year	Date	Event	Source
1941	January 1	Provincehood of Romblon (Commonwealth Act No. 38)	
1941	March 15	Philippine Airlines starts operations with its maiden flight between Makati and Baguio cities.	
1941	November 11	Manuel Quezon re-elected as President	
1941	December 8	Start of the Japanese invasion of the Philippines following Pearl Harbor attack.	
1941	December 10	Japanese planes attack Sangley Point in Cavite.	
1941	December 17	Wenceslao Vinzons organizes a citizen's army to fight Japanese forces in Camarines Norte.	
1941	December 20	President Quezon, his family and the war cabinet move to Corregidor Island	
1941	December 26	General MacArthur declares Manila an open city	
1941	December 28	Filipino and US armies retreat to Bataan	
1941	December 30	Pres. Quezon and Vice Pres. Osmeña take their oath of office for their second term in Corregidor Island, Cavite.	
1942	January 2	Japanese troops enters Manila	
1942	January 3	Masaharu Homma appointed as Japanese Military Governor (1942)	
1942	January 3	General Masaharu Homma declares the end of American Rule in the Philippines	
1942	January 3	Martial Law declared	
1942	January 13	All forms of opposition against the Japanese forces declared subject to death penalty	
1942	January 23	An executive committee, composed of Filipinos, is formed by General Homma as a conduit of the military administration's policies and requirements.	
1942	February 17	The Japanese Military Government issues an order adopting the Japanese educational system in The Country	
1942	February 20	President Quezon and the war cabinet leave for the US	
1942	March 11	General MacArthur leaves for Australia to take command of the South Western Pacific Area	
1942	March 13	The Commonwealth government is moved to the US	
1942	March 25	Hukbong Bayan Laban sa Hapon (Hukbalahap, People's Anti-Japanese Army) is organized in Cabiao, Nueva Ecija.	
1942	April	A pro-US resistance movement is organized, mainly to provide data to the US on enemy positions	
1942	April 9	Battle of Bataan: Bataan, under US commander Gen. Edward King, is the last province that surrenders to the Japanese armies.	
1942	May 6	Corregidor Island falls to Japanese forces.	
1942	June 8	Shizuichi Tanaka appointed as Japanese Military Governor (1942–1943)	
1942	June 14	The Commonwealth of the Philippines becomes a member of the United Nations	
1942	December 30	The Kalibapi is organized by the Japanese	
1943	May 28	Shigenori Kuroda appointed as Japanese Military Governor (1943–1942)	
1943	June 20	Japanese Premier Hideki Tojo nominates an all Filipino 20 member Preparatory Commission for Philippine Independence	
1943	September 4	The Philippine Preparatory Commission for Independence drafts a new Constitution which provides for a unicameral national assembly	
1943	September 20	The 108 delegates to the National Assembly are chosen by the members of the Preparatory Commission for Philippine Independence.	
1943	September	Jose P. Laurel elected President of the Philippines by the National Assembly	
1943	October 14	The puppet government is inaugurated. Laurel takes his oath of office	
1943	November	The Philippine economy collapses, the shortage of rice becomes serious.	
1943	November 10	U.S. Congress approves a resolution allowing Pres. Quezon to serve beyond the designated period, nine days after his term expires.	
1944	May	The puppet government inaugurates the Green Revolution Movement.	
1944	August 1	Death of Pres. Quezon; Vice Pres. Sergio Osmena then assumes the Office of the President of the Commonwealth of the Philippines.	
1944	September 21	US forces raids Manila	
1944	September 26	Tomoyuki Yamashita appointed as Japanese Military Governor (1944–1945)	
1944	October 20	Gen. MacArthur lands in Palo, Leyte, accompanied by Pres. Osmeña and U.S. troops.	
1944	October 23	Gen. Douglas MacArthur reestablishes the Commonwealth government of the Philippines in Tacloban, Leyte, with Sergio Osmeña as its president.	
1944	October 24	Battle of Leyte Gulf: Battle of Sibuyan Sea	
1944	December 8	Pro-Japanese Philippine generals Pio Duran and Benigno Ramos organize the Makapilis	
1945	January 9	U.S. troops led by Gen. MacArthur land on the shores of Pangasinan via Lingayen Gulf in an attempt to liberate the country from the Japanese.	
1945	January 30	Raid at Cabanatuan: 121 American soldiers and 800 Filipino guerrillas free 813 American Prisoners of war from the Japanese-held camp in the city of Cabanatuan in the Philippines.	
1945	January–February	Battle of Bataan (1945)	
1945	February–April	Battle of Baguio	
1945	February	Raid at Los Baños	
1945	February 4	US troops enter Manila	
1945	February 22	Hukbalahap troop leaders arrested by the US forces	
1945	February 24	The Battle of Manila ends. The Japanese surrender to the combined US and Filipino troops	
1945	February 27	MacArthur hands over Malacanang Palace to Osmena.	
1945	March–April	Battle for Cebu City	
1945	March–July	Battle of the Visayas	
1945	March	Corregidor Island is reoccupied by the Americans.	
1945	March 3	Battle of Manila (1945): The US and Filipino troops recaptured Manila.	
1945	March 18	Town of Panay in Capiz and the province of Romblon are liberated from the Japanese forces.	
1945	March 19	Filipino and American forces defeat the Japanese in a battle occurred in Bacsil Ridge in San Fernando, La Union.	
1945	March 22	The families of pro-Japanese President Laurel and Speaker Aquino leave the country for Japan to seek refuge	
1945	March 24	Town of San Fernando in La Union is liberated from the Japanese forces.	
1945	April 22	Palawan is liberated from Japanese invaders.	
1945	April 27	Baguio is liberated from Japanese forces.	
1945	May 10–13	Filipino and U.S. forces defeat the Japanese in a battle occurred in Balete Pass (now Dalton Pass) in Santa Fe, Nueva Vizcaya.	
1945	June 5	The Congress elected in 1941 convenes for the first time	
1945	June 14	Filipino soldiers, with the Americans, defeat the Japanese under Gen. Tomoyuki Yamashita in a battle in Tagudin, Ilocos Sur; considered as their greatest victory in World War II.	
1945	July 5	General MacArthur announces the liberation of the Philippines	
1945	August 15	The Empire of Japan accepts defeat	
1945	August 17	Pres. Laurel issues an Executive Proclamation putting an end to the Second Philippine Republic, thus ending to his term as President of the Philippines.	
1945	September 2	The final official Japanese Instrument of Surrender is accepted by the Supreme Allied Commander, General Douglas MacArthur, and Fleet Admiral Chester W. Nimitz for the United States, and delegates from Australia, New Zealand, the United Kingdom, The Netherlands, China, and others from a Japanese delegation led by Mamoru Shigemitsu, on board the American battleship USS Missouri in Tokyo Bay.	
1945	September 2	Japanese general Tomoyuki Yamashita surrenders to Filipino and American forces at Kiangan, Ifugao.	
1945	September 12	Jose P. Laurel is arrested by the US army	
1945	September 26	Provincehood of Catanduanes (Commonwealth Act No. 687), former sub-province independent from Albay.	
1945	October 24	The United Nations is founded by ratification of its Charter, by 29 nations.	
1945	December	Manuel Roxas separates from the Nacionalista Party of Sergio Osmena Sr and joins the Liberal Party	
1946	February 23	Tomoyuki Yamashita is executed by hanging at Los Baños, Laguna prison camp for the war crimes.	
1946	April 23	Manuel Roxas wins in the last presidential election under the Commonwealth	
1946	April	U.S. Pres. Harry Truman signs into law the Philippine Trade Act (Bell Trade Act) of 1946, continuing free trade relations between the U.S. and the Philippines, and imposing tariffs; Tydings Rehabilitation Act passed.	
1946	June 13	Bolinao Electronics Corporation (BEC) is established by James Lindenberg; later Alto Broadcasting System (ABS) and the forerunner of ABS–CBN.	
1946	July	Hukbong Mapaglaya ng Bayan (HMB) is organized in Candaba, Pampanga.	
1946	July	Congress votes to accept the Bell Trade Act.	
1946	July 4	The United States recognizes the Independence of the Republic of the Philippines.	
1946	July 4	Manuel Roxas becomes the first president of the Third Republic.	
1946	September	Congress passes an amendment that revises Constitution, allowing the Americans parity rights.	
1946	September 30	The Amended Tenancy Act is promulgated.	
1947	January	Rehabilitation Finance Corporation (RFC), later Development Bank of the Philippines, begins its operations.	
1947	January 28	President Roxas issues an amnesty proclamation to collaborators	
1947	March	An amendment in the 1935 Constitution granting parity rights to the Americans is ratified in a plebiscite.	
1947	March	The Military Assistance Act is signed by U.S. Ambassador Paul McNutt and Pres. Roxas.	
1947	March 6	HUKBALAHAP declared illegal	
1947	March 14	The Treaty of General Relations between Philippines and United States, the Military Bases Agreement, is signed; would be effective until 1991.	
1947	September 8	The Philippine representative to the Far Eastern Commission, Carlos P. Romulo, signs the Japanese Peace Treaty	
1947	October 12	Corregidor Island in Cavite is turned over to the Philippines.	
1947	October 16	Turtle Islands, now in Tawi-Tawi, is placed under country's jurisdiction.	
1947	November	First post-war elections held for local officials and senators.	
1948	January	Pres. Roxas issues a general pardon for all those with collaboration cases and pending cases in the People's Court.	
1948	March	Hukbong Mapagpalaya ng Bayan and Pambansang Kaisahan ng mga Magbubukid (PKM) are declared illegal organizations by Pres. Roxas.	
1948	April 15	Death of Pres. Roxas; Vice Pres. Elpidio Quirino assumes the Office of President.	
1948	June	Pres. Quirino issues an amnesty proclamation given to the surrendered members of Hukbalahap and PKM.	
1948	July	Newly formed Quezon City is declared capital of the Philippines by Pres. Quirino. (Republic Act No. 333)	
1948	August	Huk leaders under Luis Taruc go underground to continue the resistance against the government following failed truce negotiations.	
1948	October 1	Pres. Quirino releases the result of the country's first official postwar census, taken and compiled by the Bureau of the Census and Statistics, showing the population after its independence from the U.S. at 19.2 million.	
1948	November	PKP renews armed struggle following failed truce negotiations with the government.	
1948	December	Quirino administration imposes import control, a law that would be effective on the first day of 1949.	
1949	January	Establishment and inauguration of Central Bank of the Philippines.	
1949	April 28	Former First Lady Aurora Aragon–Quezon (widow of Pres. Manuel Quezon), with her eldest daughter, and Quezon City Mayor Ponciano Bernardo, are among those killed in an ambush allegedly by the Hukbalahap in Bongabon, Nueva Ecija.	
1949	November	Pres. Quirino reelected.	
1949	November	A month-long rebellion occurred in Batangas.	

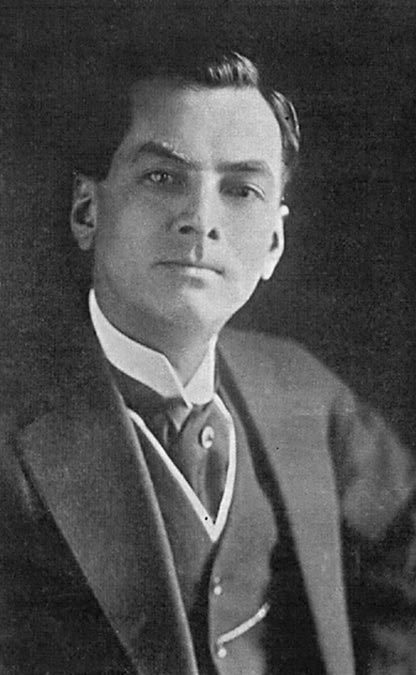
Manuel L. Quezon was the First President of Commonwealth of the Philippines, the father of Philippine Language.

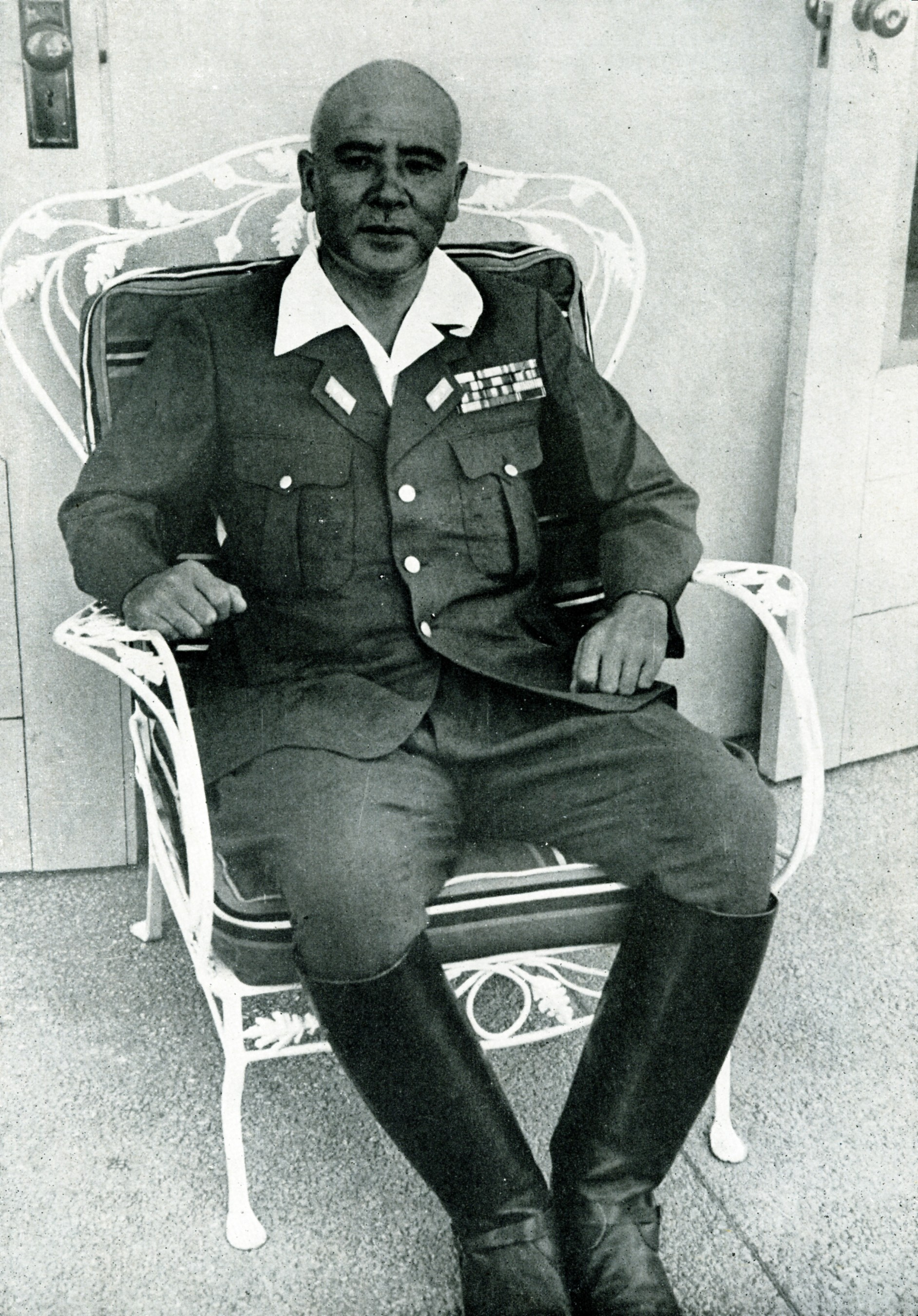
Masaharu Homma

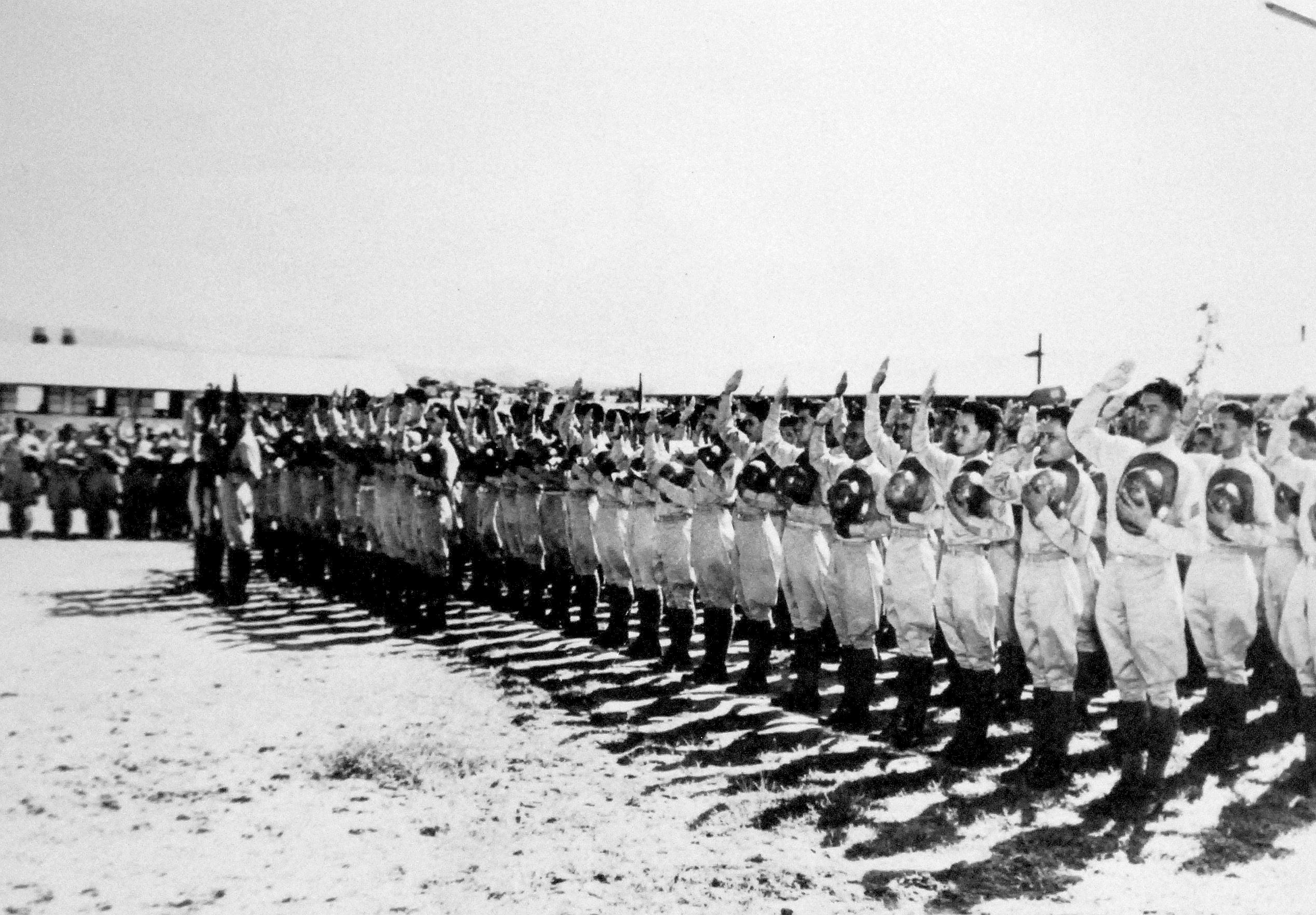
The Philippine Constabulary

=== 1950s ===
Year	Date	Event	Source
1950	February	UST pioneers the television broadcast, only for experimental purposes.	
1950	June	The Philippines joins the Korean War, sending over 7,000 troops under the United Nations command.	
1950	June 15	Old Mindoro is divided into the new provinces of Mindoro Occidental and Mindoro Oriental. (Republic Act No. 505)	
1950	October	Twenty-three high-ranking PKP and Huk Politburo members are captured in a series of raids led by Secy. Magsaysay in Manila.	
1950	October	Pres. Quirino suspends the privilege of writ of habeas corpus regarding detention of suspected communists.	
1951	March 6	Fort Santiago was declared a National Shrine.	
1951	May	Suspected PKP members are penalized by the Court of First Instance, with six given death sentences and nine given life sentences.	
1951	July–September	Armed Forces of the Philippines launches offensives against Huks in Laguna and Pampanga.	
1951	August	National Movement for Free Elections (NAMFREL) is established	
1951	August 30	The Mutual Defense Treaty between Philippines and United States was signed.	
1951	October 8	Nicasio "Asiong" Salonga, branded as Tondo's public enemy No. 1 and the kingpin of Manila, was shot and killed by Ernesto Reyes, a henchman of his rival and also notorious gang leader Carlos "Totoy Golem" Capistrano.	
1952	April–May	Armed Forces launches Operation Four Roses in Nueva Ecija in the search for Huk strongholds in Sierra Madre mountains.	
1952	June 6	Old Zamboanga is divided into the new provinces of Zamboanga del Norte and Zamboanga del Sur. (Republic Act No. 711)	
1953	June	Magna Carta for Labor is signed into law. (Republic Act No. 875)	
1953	October 23	DZAQ-TV Channel 3, now Channel 2, of ABS, then owned by presidential brother Antonio Quirino, airs its country's first official television broadcast from Manila.	
1953	November 10	Ramon Magsaysay is elected President of the Republic of the Philippines	
1954		Social Security Act is passed in Congress.	
1954	May	Huk Supremo Luis Taruc surrenders to Pres. Magsaysay, prompting an end of the eight-year Huk rebellion.	
1954	May 22	Cityhood of Trece Martires, Cavite (Republic Act No. 981)	
1954	July 21	The Southeast Asia Collective Defense Treaty is signed in Manila, creating the South East Asian Treaty Organization (SEATO)	
1954	August	Agricultural Tenancy Act of 1954 passed.	
1954	September	Southeast Asian Treaty Organization (SEATO) is established in Manila, with the Philippines as one of its eight members.	
1954	December 15	Laurel-Langley Agreement: An agreement between the Philippines and the U.S., regarding provisions of the Philippine Trade Act of 1946, is signed by Sen. Jose P. Laurel and Secy. James M. Langley.	
1955	September	Laurel-Langley Agreement is ratified by the U.S. and Philippine governments, to be effective on the first day of 1956.	
1956	April 25	Provincehood of Aklan (Republic Act No. 1414), separating from Capiz.	
1956	May	Rizal Bill is passed into law amid opposition from Catholic Church.	
1957	February 24	ABS is acquired by Eugenio Lopez Sr. of CBN, of which they later merged into ABS–CBN with two television stations later being operated.	
1957	March 17	Death of Pres. Magsaysay, one among the 25 killed in a plane crash in Cebu; Vice-Pres. Carlos P. Garcia assumes the presidency.	
1957	June	Anti-Subversion Act passed. (Republic Act No. 1700)	
1957	July	U.S. Congress ratifies a law (Republic Act No. 85-81) granting the Philippines possession of the documents regarding the revolution.	
1957	November 14	Carlos P. Garcia elected President of the Republic of the Philippines	
1958	March 22	Xavier University-Ateneo de Cagayan is elevated by the Department of Education to university rank, becoming the Mindanao's first private and Catholic university.	
1958	August 28	"Filipino First" policy is officially promulgated by the National Economic Council (Resolution No. 204).	
1959	May 22	Old Lanao is divided into the new provinces of Lanao del Norte and Lanao del Sur. (Republic Act No. 2228); inaugurated, July 4.	
1959	May 22	RA 2227 created the province of Southern Leyte, separating from Leyte.	
1959	July 18	10th World Scout Jamboree is held at Mt. Makiling in Los Baños, Laguna.	
1959	September–October	An agreement between Foreign Affairs Secy. Felixberto Serrano and Amb. Charles Bohlen is signed, following series of conferences, in which duration of lease of the American military bases is reduced from 99 to 25 years.	
1959	October	U.S. authorities turns over Olongapo City to the Philippine government.	

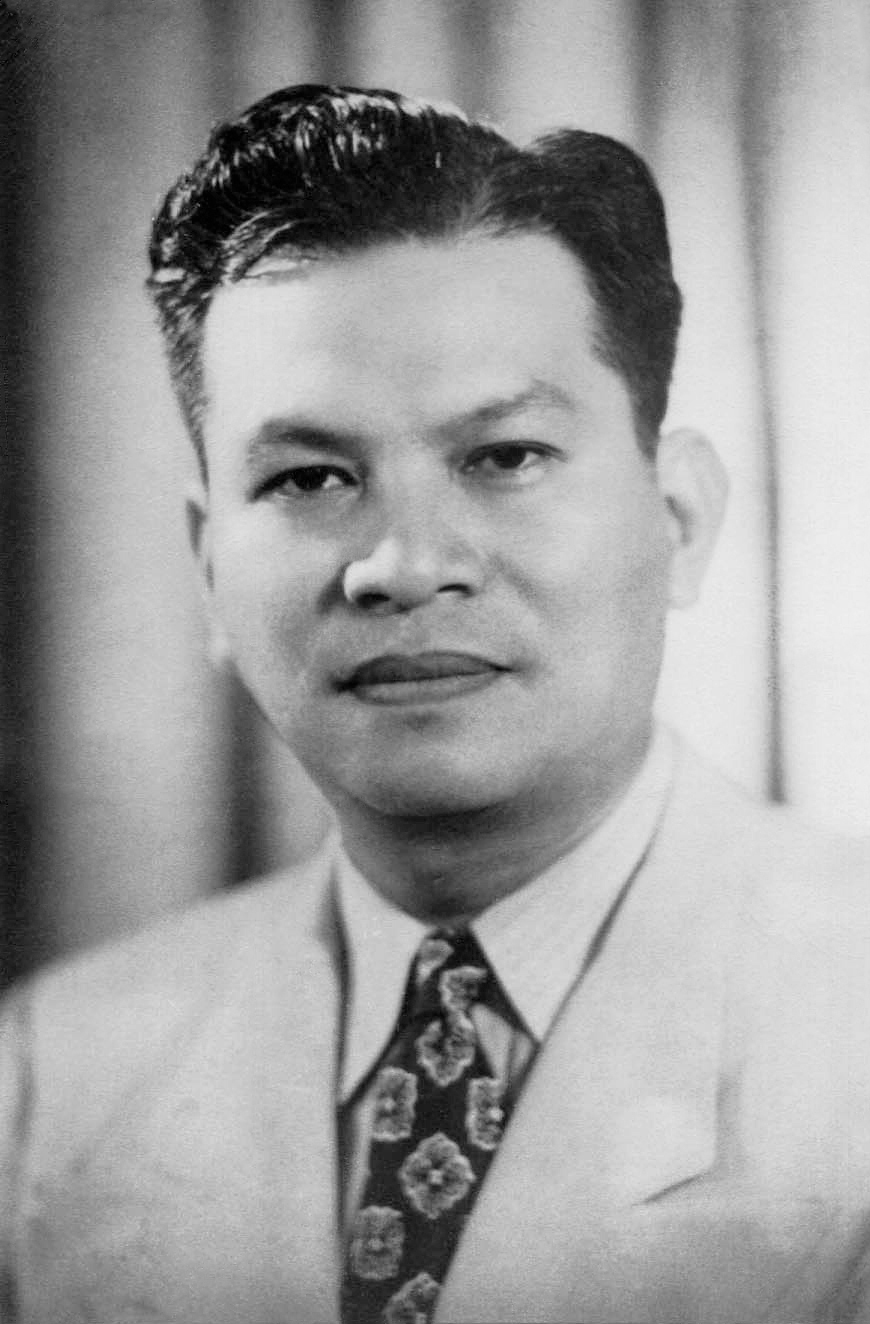
Ramon Magsaysay, the Man of Mass.

=== 1960s ===
Year	Date	Event	Source
1960		International Rice Research Institute is established in Los Baños, Laguna.	
1960	March	Archbishop Rufino Santos is the first Filipino to achieve the rank of Cardinal.	
1960	June 19	Republic Act No. 2786 divided old Surigao into the new provinces of Surigao del Norte and Surigao del Sur.	
1961	January 18	Baguio experiences cold at 6.3-degree Celsius, the country's lowest temperature ever recorded.	
1961	November 7	Diosdado Macapagal elected President of the Republic of the Philippines.	
1962	January	Philippine Constabulary Rangers conduct a siege of the Central Bank building to oust its governor, Dominador Aytona, due to "midnight appointments" of his own.	
1962	January	Pres. Macapagal lifts exchange and import controls in his campaign for free enterprise.	
1962	May 12	Commemoration of Independence Day is officially changed by Pres. Macapagal, from July 4 to June 12 (Proclamation No. 28); to be first celebrated on that day of that same year.	
1962	June 22	Pres. Macapagal's government, with the United Kingdom, files a communication regarding country's claim of North Borneo (Sabah), now in Malaysia.	
1962	September	Electrification Administration Act (Republic Act No. 2717) is implemented through an executive order issued by Pres. Macapagal.	
1963	July 28	Twenty-four members of the Philippine contingent for the 11th World Scout Jamboree in Greece are among the 60 deaths in a plane crash into the Indian Ocean.	
1963	July	Pres. Macapagal, Sukarno (Indonesia), and Tungku Abdul Rahman (Federation of Malaya) sign the Manila Accord, an agreement for Maphilindo.	
1963	August 8	Agricultural Land Reform Code (Republic Act No. 3844) is signed into law by Pres. Macapagal.	
1964	May	Partido Komunista ng Pilipinas secretary-general Jesus Lava is captured in Sampaloc, Manila.	
1964	August	Congress ratifies an executive order issued by Pres. Macapagal that changes the date of celebration of the nation's Independence Day, by virtue of Republic Act No. 4166.	
1964	August 14	Miss Philippines Gemma Cruz was crowned Miss International 1964, the first Filipino to win the title.	
1964	November	Kabataang Makabayan (KM) is formed by Jose Maria Sison, with himself elected as its chairman.	
1965	June 19	Republic Act No. 4221 divided old Samar into the new provinces of Western Samar, Northern Samar, and Eastern Samar.	
1965	September	Taal Volcano in Batangas erupts, killing around 2,000 and damaging villages.	
1965	November 9	Ferdinand Marcos elected President of the Republic of the Philippines.	
1966		Asian Development Bank establishes its new headquarters in Manila.	
1966	February	Philippine-American Assembly is held in Davao.	
1966	June 18	Old Mountain Province is divided into the new provinces of Benguet, Mountain Province, Kalinga-Apayao and Ifugao. (Republic Act No. 4695)	
1966	June 18	Republic Act No. 4669 created the province of Camiguin, separating from Misamis Oriental.	
1966	June 18	Republic Act No. 4849 created the province of South Cotabato, separating from Empire Province of Cotabato.	
1966	July	Pres. Marcos signs the controversial Vietnam Aid Law.	
1966	July	The mayor of Candaba, Pampanga, also the president of the Anti-Huk Mayors League in the province, is killed in an ambush, an incident which was attributed to the Huks.	
1966	August	Congress approves the appropriation for the Philippine Civil Action Group (Philcag) to be sent to Vietnam.	
1966	September	The first batch of the battalion of the Philcag leaves the Philippines for South Vietnam.	
1966	September	An agreement is signed by U.S. secretary of state Dean Rusk and Foreign Affairs Secy. Narciso Ramos, reducing the lease of military bases from 99 to 25 years, thus to expire in 1991.	
1966	October	Marcos administration hosts the Manila Summit with 6 countries.	
1967	January	Two buses carrying pilgrims collide and fall off a ravine south of Manila, killing more than 115 in what would be the country's worst road accident.	
1967	February	Movement for the Advancement of Nationalism (MAN) is formed by nationalists from various sectors.	
1967	May 8	Old Davao is divided into the new provinces of Davao del Norte, Davao del Sur, and Davao Oriental. (Republic Act No. 4867)	
1967	May 21	A demonstration conducted by Lapiang Malaya, a peasant religious sect, ends in a violent dispersal attempt by the Philippine Constabulary in Pasay, killing 33.	
1967	June 17	Republic Act No. 4979 divided old Agusan into the new provinces of Agusan del Norte and Agusan del Sur.	
1967	August 8	Association of Southeast Asian Nations (ASEAN) is formed in Bangkok, Thailand, with the Philippines as one of the five founding members.	
1968		First provincial television stations are established in Cebu, Bacolod, and Dagupan, all operated by ABS–CBN.	
1968	March 18	Jabidah massacre: A group of trainees of a Muslim special forces unit, part of a controversial operation, are allegedly killed in Corregidor.	
1968	August 2	1968 Casiguran earthquake and the collapse of Ruby Tower	
1968	September	Pres. Marcos signs into law a bill defining country's territorial waters in compliance with the United Nations and claiming Sabah as part of the country's territory, amidst protest from the Malaysians.	
1968	September	Pres. Marcos pardons 166 prisoners, including former Huk leader Luis Taruc.	
1968	December 26	Communist Party of the Philippines (CPP; then called CPP–Marxist–Leninist-Mao Tse-tung Thought or CPP–MLMTT) is reestablished by Jose Maria Sison and his colleagues in Pangasinan.	
1969	March 29	New People's Army (NPA) is formally organized in Tarlac by Bernabe Buscayno (Kumander Dante) of PKP as the military arm of the CPP, upon merger with Jose Maria Sison's army.	
1969	May 11	Tuguegarao City, Cagayan experienced heat at 42.2 degrees Celsius, the country's highest temperature ever recorded.	
1969	July 19	Miss Philippines Gloria Diaz was crowned Miss Universe 1969.	
1969	November 11	Marcos re-elected President of the Republic of the Philippines (second term).	

=== 1970s ===
Year	Date	Event	Source
1970		Typhoon Patsy (Yoling) is the most devastating typhoon to hit the country at that time.	
1970	January 26–March	First Quarter Storm: January 26 – It begins when protesting students confronted Pres. Marcos after his Presidential Address in the Old Legislative Building, Manila.; January 30 – Battle of Mendiola occurs.; February 18 & 26 – People's Congresses held in Plaza Miranda.; March 3 – People's March is organized, route is from Welcome Rotonda to Liwasang Bonifacio.	
1970	April	Major rallies and riots held, protesting oil prices and fare costs.	
1970	June 27	Pres. Marcos publicly endorses the Barrio Self-Defense Units, later Civilian Home Defense Forces.	
1970	November 17	Elections for 315 members of a Constitutional Convention held.	
1970	November 27	Pope Paul VI makes his first papal visit in the Philippines, but survived an assassination attempt by Benjamín Mendoza y Amor Flores at Manila International Airport.	
1970	December 29	Members of the New People's Army, led by Lt. Victor Corpuz, raid the armory of the Philippine Military Academy.	
1971		Moro National Liberation Front is established by Nur Misuari.	
1971	February	Diliman commune	
1971	June	Manili massacre	
1971	June 1	The Constitutional Convention assembles to rewrite the 1935 Constitution. The Convention elects former Pres. Carlos Garcia as its head.	
1971	June 14	Death of Carlos Garcia, former Philippine president; another former president Diosdado Macapagal succeeds as the president of the Constitutional Convention.	
1971	August 21	Plaza Miranda is bombed during the Liberal Party's election campaign, seriously injuring some opposition personalities.	
1971	August 22	Pres. Marcos suspends the Writ of Habeas Corpus following the Plaza Miranda bombing.	
1971	September	U.S. operations in Sangley Point Naval Base terminated.	
1971	September 10	Provincehood of Quirino (Republic Act No. 6394), former sub-province independent from Nueva Vizcaya.	
1971	September 17	Provincehood of Siquijor (Republic Act No. 6398), former sub-province independent from Negros Oriental.	
1971	October 10	Leonardo "Nardong Putik" Manecio, one of the most notorious gangsters and dubbed as Cavite's public enemy No. 1 was killed in Imus in a highway shootout with NBI agents.	
1971	November	Philippine Senate election, 1971	
1972		Suspicious bombing incidents increase all over the country. The MNLF launches its campaign for the independence of the Muslim provinces.	
1972		Parliamentary form of government is approved by the Constitutional Convention.	
1972	January	Pres. Marcos restores the Writ of Habeas Corpus	
1972	June	Daily Express is established; Martial Law era newspaper later sequestered by Aquino government.	
1972	August	Quasha decision: Supreme Court decides on American ownership rights.	
1972	September 13	Sen. Ninoy Aquino exposes Oplan Sagittarius, a top-secret plan to place the capital under military control.	
1972	September 21	Pres. Marcos signs the Martial Law edict (Proclamation No. 1081) to be imposed nationwide; at that time not publicly announced.	
1972	September 22	Defense Minister Juan Ponce Enrile survives a staged assassination attempt.	
1972	September 22	Pres. Marcos announces that he had placed the entire country under martial law, with the earlier "ambush" as a pretext.	
1972	September 22	Media establishments and wire agencies are ordered to be closed.	
1972	September 22	Sen. Aquino arrested.	
1972	September 23	The implementation of martial law is officially announced.	
1972	September 23	Public utilities as well as media outlets, except some including newspaper Daily Express and television and radio stations of Kanlaon Broadcasting System, are shut down and seized by the government.	
1972	September 23	Media and opposition figures, including three other senators, are arrested.	
1972	September 26	The whole country is proclaimed a land reform area and an Agrarian Reform Program is decreed.	
1972	September 26	The first major armed defiance of martial law takes place in Lanao del Sur	
1972	October	Land reform program issued (Presidential Decree 27)	
1972	October 22	The battle between the MNLF and the government troops ends with the latter regaining control of the city.	
1972	November 29	The Constitutional Convention passes the new Constitution of the Philippines.	
1972	December	First Lady Imelda Marcos survives an assassination attempt.	
1973		Misuari leaves The Country for Libya to solicit armed support from Muslim countries for the war in Mindanao.	
1973	January 10–15	A plebiscite referendum is held among the citizens' assemblies to ratify the new Constitution, which would become effective.	
1973	January 15	Chinese drug lord Lim Seng is executed by firing squad in public in Fort Bonifacio for drug trafficking.	
1973	January 17	Pres. Marcos declares the approval of the 1973 Constitution, orders Congress padlocked.	
1973	March 1	Philippine News Agency established	
1973	March 31	Supreme Court upholds the validity of the 1973 Constitution.	
1973	April	The National Democratic Front (NDF), the united front organization of the Communist Party of the Philippines, is formally organized.	
1973	May	Masagana 99 program launched	
1973	July 2	San Juanico Bridge, connecting Samar and Leyte islands, is inaugurated.	
1973	July 21	Miss Philippines Margarita Moran was crowned Miss Universe 1973.	
1973	July 27	Marcos' term as president extended by virtue of a referendum, which was later proven as a hoax	
1973	September 27	Provincehood of Tawi-Tawi (Presidential Decree No. 302), separating from Sulu.	
1973	November 22	Old Cotabato is divided into the new provinces of North Cotabato (later renamed Cotabato, 1984), Maguindanao, and Sultan Kudarat. (PD 341)	
1973	December 27	Provincehood of Basilan (PD 356)	
1974	February	Jolo is occupied and burned by Muslim forces.	
1974	February 27	Presidential appointments to local elective positions declared legal by virtue of another referendum	
1974	March 11	Japanese Lt. Hiroo Onoda formally surrenders in a ceremony held in Malacañang Palace after staying for years in the Lubang Island.	
1974	June	First Filipino All-Muslim Congress held in Marawi City.	
1974	July	Parity rights amendment as stated in 1955 Laurel–Langley Trade Act expired.	
1974	July 21	Miss Universe 1974, its 23rd pageant, was held in Manila.	
1974	September	Jose Diokno is ordered by Pres. Marcos to be released.	
1974	September	Barangay status is reorganized and Sep 21 is declared Barangay Day (Presidential Decree 557).	
1974	September 17	Supreme Court upholds the declaration of martial law and dismisses petitions regarding habeas corpus.	
1974	October	Secretary-general of the old communist party Felicisimo Macapagal signs a memorandum of cooperation with the President's efforts.	
1974	December 24	A classified wire revealing the so-called Rolex 12 is submitted by the American Embassy in Manila to the Secretary of State in Washington, D.C.	
1975	February	Primitivo Mijares defects from the government.	
1975	February	Third referendum, asking for continuation of exercising the presidential powers, held.	
1975	April 4	Ninoy Aquino starts his hunger strike for his refusal to recognize military court's jurisdiction on charges against him.	
1975	April 9	Philippine Basketball Association founded	
1975	June	Diplomatic relations with People's Republic of China formalized.	
1975	June	Primitivo Mijares testifies in the U.S. Congress on the alleged corruption and abuses of the government.	
1975	October 2	Thrilla in Manila	
1975	November 1	Pres. Marcos issues Presidential Decree No. 824, establishing Metro Manila and creating the Metropolitan Manila Commission (MMC).	
1976	January 4	New people's Army Spokesman Satur Ocampo arrested	
1976	August 17	An earthquake of 7.8 magnitude and a following tsunami (flood wave) hit Mindanao, killing an estimated 8,000 people on and off the coast.	
1976	August 26	Kumander Dante of the New People's Army arrested	
1976	October 16	Martial Law allowed to extend by virtue of a plebiscite	
1976	December 23	Tripoli Agreement is signed between the Philippine Government and the secessionist group Moro National Liberation Front (MNLF) in Tripoli, Libya.	
1977	January 20	The Armed Forces of the Philippines enters into a ceasefire agreement with the MNLF.	
1977	March 4	President Marcos issues a decree creating the autonomous Bangsamoro Islamic Government	
1977	August	Pres. Marcos announces amnesty for persons found guilty of subversion.	
1977	August 22	Imposition of curfew hours lifted	
1977	September 2	Archimedes Trajano found dead, murdered	
1977	October	Eugenio Lopez Jr. and Sergio Osmeña III escaped from detention in Fort Bonifacio and flee to the United States.	
1977	November 10	CPP head Jose Maria Sison arrested	
1977	November 25	The military court finds Ninoy Aquino, Bernabe Buscayno and Victor Corpuz guilty of their charges and sentences them to death by firing squad; but sentence never imposed.	
1977	December 16	A referendum is held, the result of which again empowers the president to continue in office, and to become prime minister as well.	
1978	April 7	Members of the Interim Batasang Pambansa are elected.	
1978	June	Inauguration of Interim Batasang Pambansa with Pres. Marcos as its prime minister.	
1978	September 21	Tadhana (1978), the first feature-length animated film in the Philippines premiered one time at the local television on GMA 7, RPN 9, and IBC 13 to commemorate the anniversary of Martial Law in 1978.	
1978	October 5	Jesus is Lord Church led by Eddie Villanueva, a former activist and professor was established.	
1979	January	U.S. military bases agreement amended.	
1979	April 10	President Ferdinand Marcos issues Presidential Decree No. 1616 creating the Intramuros Administration	
1979	May	Regional assembly elections held in Mindanao.	
1979	May–June	United Nations Conference on Trade and Development is held in the Philippine International Convention Center.	
1979	July 30	Eat Bulaga!, the longest running noon-time variety show in the Philippines, premiered on RPN. It was also aired on ABS-CBN from 1989 to 1995 and on GMA Network since 1995.	
1979	August 13	Aurora province was established by Batas Pambansa Blg. 7.	
1979	October 31	Project Gintong Alay, a national sports program was commenced.	
1979	November	Construction of a nuclear-power plant in Bataan is ordered to be stopped.	
1979	December	Ninoy Aquino is released from detention for the first time after given a furlough.	

=== 1980s ===
Year	Date	Event	Source
1980		The Philippines' first local elections under the martial law era is held amid wide boycotts.	
1980	April 22	MV Don Juan and oil tanker MT Tacloban City collide in Tablas Strait off Mindoro, killing 176.	
1980	May	Kilusang Mayo Uno (KMU) organized	
1980	May	Pres. Marcos allows Ninoy Aquino to flee to the U.S. for his medical treatment.	
1981	January 17	Martial law lifted (Proclamation 2045)	
1981	February 17–21	Pope John Paul II visited the Philippines for his first papal visit.	
1981	April 7	Executive Committee is created by a constitutional amendment as ratified in a plebiscite.	
1981	June 16	1981 Philippine general election and referendum (Ferdinand Marcos re-elected to a third term).	
1981	June 30	Inauguration of Pres. Marcos; Finance Minister Cesar Virata is elected Prime Minister by the Batasang Pambansa	
1981	November 17	Accident during the construction of the Manila Film Center, 169 were killed.	
1982		Reform the Armed Forces Movement (RAM) formed	
1982	January	International Film Festival is held in the Manila Film Center.	
1982	April	United Nationalist Democratic Opposition formed.	
1982	May	Barangay elections held for the first time.	
1982	December	Newspapers We Forum and Malaya are shut down by the President for engaging in "black propaganda."	
1983	August 21	Sen. Benigno Aquino Jr. is assassinated at then Manila International Airport.	
1983	August 31	Approximately seven million people attends funeral procession of Ninoy Aquino which turned into a rally, the longest and largest in history.	
1983	November 21	Martyrdom of Good Shepherd Sisters	
1984	January 27	Executive Committee is abolished and the Office of the Vice President is restored through a constitutional amendment as ratified in a plebiscite.	
1984	February	"Tarlac to Tarmac" march is staged by opposition and coalition groups.	
1984	May 14	1984 Philippine parliamentary election	
1984	July	National Assembly covenes; Prime Minister Virata reconfirmed; Nicanor Yniguez elected Speaker.	
1984	August 19	El Shaddai DWXI Prayer Partners Foundation International, Inc. led by Bro. Mike Z. Velarde, a geological engineer and movie producer was established.	
1984	September 1	Typhoon Nitang struck the Philippines. It killed 1,492 people and 1,856 more were injured. Roughly 1.6 million people were affected in the country.	
1984	November 14	Mayor Cesar Climaco assassinated	
1984	December 1	Manila LRT Line 1 opened as the Southeast Asia's first rail line.	
1985
1985	July	Pres. Marcos transfers the control of the Integrated National Police from Defense Ministry to the presidential control.	
1985	August	Opposition Parliament members file impeachment charges against Pres. Marcos.	
1985	September 20	A massacre in Escalante, Negros Occidental kills at least 20 people.	
1985	October 18	Typhoon Dot (Saling) landfalls on the country, leaves at least 101 people dead.	
1985	October 21	Marchers joining the five-day Lakbayan rally are shot by the police at Taft Avenue before reaching Liwasang Bonifacio, leaving a number of deaths.	
1985	October 28	Congressional and U.S. intelligence sources report that Pres. Marcos was diagnosed with a fatal illness.	
1985	November 3	Pres. Marcos announces in a television interview that he would set a snap elections.	
1985	December 2	AFP Chief of Staff Gen. Fabian Ver and 26 others accused of conspiracy in the assassination of Ninoy Aquino are acquitted by Sandiganbayan.	
1986	February 7	1986 Philippine presidential election	
1986	February 9	Thirty-five COMELEC computer workers led by Linda Kapunan walk out at PICC, protesting alleged cheating of election results.	
1986	February 11	Opposition Antique former Gov. Evelio Javier is assassinated during the canvassing of election results.	
1986	February 15	Batasang Pambansa declares Marcos and Arturo Tolentino as re-elected President and elected vice-president, respectively. Twenty-six Assembly members walk out before the proclamation.	
1986	February 16	Marcos' opponent Corazon Aquino, widow of Benigno Aquino Jr., is proclaimed President in Tagumpay ng Bayan rally in Rizal Park and calls for a civil disobedience campaign as a protest.	
1986	February 22–25	EDSA I Revolution ousts Pres. Marcos; Corazon Cojuangco–Aquino becomes President.: February 22 – Defense Minister Juan Ponce Enrile and Constabulary Chief Gen. Fidel Ramos withdraw from the Marcos administration. Crowd gather outside camps Crame and Aguinaldo. RAM joins with them as attempted coup prevented. Cardinal Jaime Sin urges the public on a growing revolt.; February 23 – People flock to two camps, and Ortigas Avenue and EDSA, to join with Enrile and Ramos and express support for Cojuangco–Aquino as the real new president. Marine forces targeting them are stopped.; February 24 – Attacks occur in Camp Aguinaldo, Villamor Airbase, and Malacañang; air force unit joins with rebels; reformists take over government-owned MBS-4.; February 25 – Cojuangco–Aquino is sworn in as president by Senior Associate Justice Claudio Teehankee, and Salvador Laurel as vice-president by Justice Vicente Abad Santos, at Club Filipino in San Juan. Aquino appoints Enrile as Defense Secretary and Ramos as AFP Chief of Staff. Marcos also holds his own inauguration as television stations covering the ceremonies are destroyed by rebels, however at evening, he and his family are transported by helicopters to Clark Air Base.	
1986	February 26	From Clark Air Base, Marcoses finally leave the country aboard U.S. planes to Guam and to Hawaii.	
1986	February 28	Presidential Commission on Good Government is formed by Pres. Aquino.	
1986	March 5	CPP founder Jose Maria Sison and NPA founder Dante Buscayno are freed by Pres. Cojuangco–Aquino.	
1986	March 25	Pres. Aquino declares a revolutionary government, abolishes Interim Batasang Pambansa and the 1973 Constitution and adopts Freedom Constitution (Proclamation No. 3).	
1986	July 6	Former Vice Pres. Arturo Tolentino, with groups of armed military officers and Marcos loyalists, occupies the Manila Hotel and declares himself as "acting" President; they are forced to surrender after the failure of the coup that lasted until the 8th.	
1986	July 22	DZMM of ABS–CBN is established as the first post-revolution AM radio station.	
1986	July 22	DWKO established as the first post-revolution FM radio station.	
1986	September 13	The Mt. Data Peace Accord is signed in Mt. Data in Bauko, Mountain Province, between the Philippine Government and the separatist Cordillera Bodong Administration–Cordillera People's Liberation Army, involving cessation of hostilities that led to a creation of an administrative region.	
1986	November 22	A coup attempt called "God Save the Queen" is reportedly discovered by the government.	
1987	January 22	Mendiola massacre: Thirteen from the farmers are killed in clashes with the forces of policemen and soldiers at Mendiola Bridge in Manila during their protest rally.	
1987	January 27–29	Pro-Marcos rebel soldiers, led by Col. Oscar Canlas, seize GMA Network compound, for almost 3 days, and military bases in Sangley Point, Cavite and in Pasay wherein an assault with government military forces results in the death of a mutineer and 16 injuries.	
1987	February 2	The 1987 constitution, drafted by the Constitutional Commission, is ratified in a plebiscite.	
1987	February 11	A new constitution is declared ratified, replacing the "freedom constitution."	
1987	April 18	A raid is staged by 56 rebel soldiers on Fort Bonifacio; a rebel soldier dies.	
1987	May 11	1987 Philippine legislative election; the first free elections held in almost two decades and under the new constitution.	
1987	July	A plot to take over MIA is discovered; four military officers are arrested.	
1987	July 15	The Cordillera Administrative Region (CAR) is created through Executive Order No. 220 signed by Pres. Cojuangco–Aquino, consisting of, from Region 1, the provinces of Abra, Benguet and Mountain Province, and Baguio, and from Region 2, the provinces of Kalinga-Apayao and Ifugao.	
1987	August 28–29	A coup attempt, said to be the bloodiest of the attempts against Pres. Aquino, is launched by rebel soldiers of RAM, led by Col. Gregorio Honasan, with assaults on Malacañang Palace, Camp Aguinaldo, Villamor Air Base, various television stations, and military camps in Pampanga and Cebu resulting in 53 fatalities and over 200 injuries; prevented on the 29th as Honasan evades arrest.	
1987	October 18	Canonization of San Lorenzo Ruiz, the first Filipino saint	
1987	November 25	Super Typhoon Sisang slammed into Luzon, killing 1,063 people.	
1987	December 20	Interisland passenger ferry Doña Paz, said to be overloaded, and oil tanker MT Vector collide and sink at Tablas Strait between Marinduque and Oriental Mindoro provinces and Tablas Island; death toll later estimated to be 4,386; the deadliest maritime disaster in peacetime world history.	
1988	January 18	Local elections are held under the new constitution.	
1988	April 2	Military reports that Col. Honasan, who led the August 1987 coup attempt, escapes from his prison ship in Manila Bay.	
1988	June 10	Pres. Cojuangco–Aquino signs the Comprehensive Agrarian Reform Program (CARP) into law (Republic Act No. 6657), providing land reform for farmers; to be effective within 10 years; later extended.	
1988	October	Former Pres. Marcos and his wife are charged in the United States regarding illegal money transfer.	
1988	October 17	Interior Bases Agreement was signed by the Philippines and United States.	
1988	October 23–24	Typhoon Unsang struck into Luzon.	
1988	October 24	Interisland ferry Doña Marilyn sinks off Leyte during a typhoon, killing 389.	
1989	January 5	Camp Cawa-Cawa in Zamboanga City is seized by some soldiers following the hostage crisis wherein seven people were taken hostage by Rizal Alih and killed in an air strike.	
1989	April 21	U.S. Army Col. James Rowe is assassinated by the Communists; incident prompts the issue of removal of the U.S. military bases from the country.	
1989	August 1	Pres. Cojuangco–Aquino signs Republic Act No. 6734 (the Organic Act), a law creating the Autonomous Region in Muslim Mindanao, giving limited autonomy to the Muslim provinces.	
1989	August 13–15	Davao hostage crisis: Felipe Pugoy and Mohammad Nasser Samparini, perpetrators of an earlier hostage-taking incident in Davao Penal Colony on April, lead the prisoners who take five people hostage in Davao Metrodiscom; ending in gunfights with the authorities resulting in the death of the hostages as well as some hostage takers.	
1989	September 28	Death of Ferdinand Marcos, former Philippine President	
1989	October 1–13	Typhoons Angela (Rubing), Dan (Saling), and Elsie (Tasing) impact the country in two weeks.: Super typhoon Angela (Rubing), causes 119 fatalities and $8 million worth of damage.; Typhoon Dan (Saling) leaves 58 dead and hundreds of thousands homeless.; Typhoon Elsie (Tasing) leaves 47 dead, $35.4 million worth of damage, and 332 thousand people homeless.	
1989	November 19	A plebiscite is held in ARMM, resulting in the ratification of RA 6734 that established the region, with the inclusion of the provinces of Lanao del Sur (except Marawi City), Maguindanao, Sulu and Tawi-Tawi.	
1989	December 1–9	A coup attempt is launched by RAM under Col. Honasan and Marcos loyalists under retired Gen. Jose Ma. Zumel, with Malacañang bombarded on the 1st and several military bases seized; rebels surrender on the 9th; the most serious attempt against Pres. Aquino with 99 casualties.	

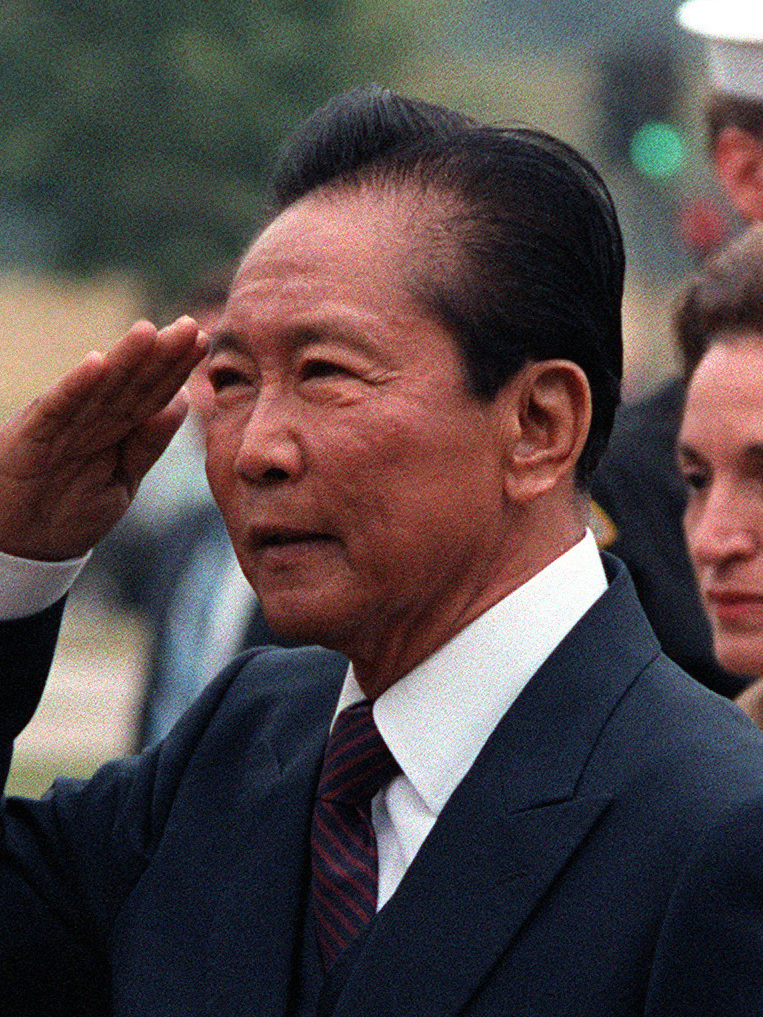
Ferdinand Marcos: The tenth President of the Philippines, The longest-term held in office.

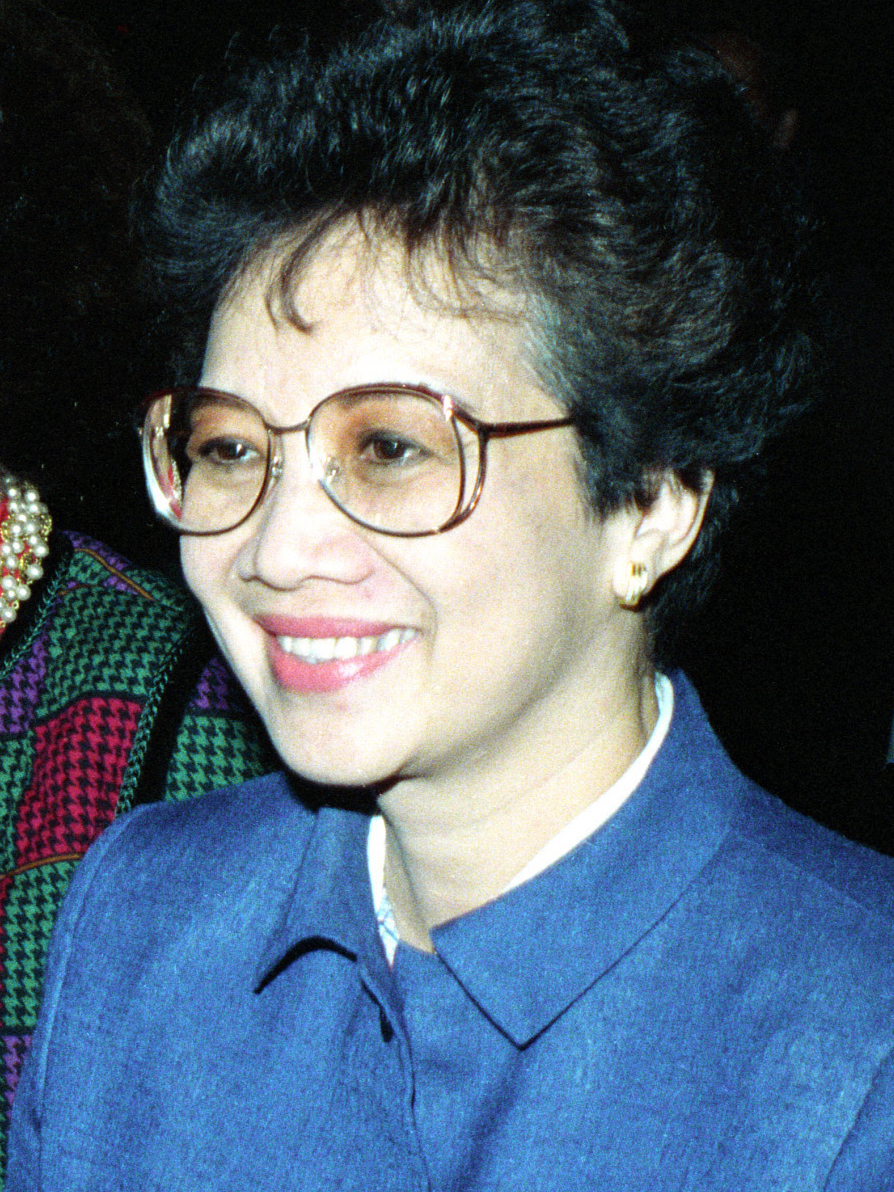
Corazon Aquino: The 11th President of the Philippines, The First-women held in office.

=== 1990s ===
Year	Date	Event	Source
1990		Autonomous Region in Muslim Mindanao is officially created.	
1990	March 4	Hotel Delfino in Tuguegarao, Cagayan is seized by suspended Gov. Rodolfo Aguinaldo and his armed men of 200, followed by a gunfight intending to kill them, with a checkpoint shootout, where 14 found dead and 10 injured.	
1990	June	U.S. Peace Corps removed 261 volunteers from the country amid Communist threats.	
1990	July 16	Luzon earthquake: An earthquake with a surface wave magnitude of 7.8, whose epicenter was recorded in Nueva Ecija, hits Northern and Central Luzon, affecting Cabanatuan, Dagupan, and Baguio cities, and parts of Nueva Ecija and Pangasinan provinces, causing a death toll of an estimated 1,621 and estimated damages worth ₱15 billion; produces a 125-km long ground rupture stretching from the municipalities of Dingalan to Cuyapo; strongest and costliest in the island since 1970.	
1990	September	Sixteen military members are convicted and sentenced to life imprisonment regarding the 1983 assassination of Sen. Aquino.	
1990	October 4–6	A raid is staged by mutinying soldiers on an army base in Mindanao on the dawn of 4th; Brig. Gen. Danilo Lim and 21 others capitulate to the government on the 6th.	
1990	October 4–6	Col. Alexander Noble stages a coup in Mindanao and seizes two military garrisons in Cagayan de Oro and Butuan cities.	
1990	November 12	Typhoon Mike (Ruping) hits Visayas, affecting Cebu City, Bacolod, and other key cities.	
1991	January 29	Merger of the Philippine Constabulary with the Integrated National Police to form the Philippine National Police.	
1991	June 12–15	Pinatubo eruption: Series of major eruptions from the dormant Mount Pinatubo, the most explosive occurred on the 15th, and worsened by Typhoon Yunya (Diding) causing massive lahar flows, affecting densely populated areas of Zambales, Tarlac and Pampanga; killing 847 people; total damages at least ₱12 billion; the second largest volcanic eruption of the 20th century.	
1991	September 16	Senate votes, 12–11, to reject a Treaty of Friendship, Peace and Cooperation between the U.S. and Philippines, an agreement for renewal of American military bases in the Philippines in exchange for aid, forcing them to leave the country.	
1991	October 10	The Local Government Code is signed into law.	
1991	November	Former First Lady Imelda Marcos returns to the country to face charges against her.	
1991	November	U.S. closes and surrenders Clark Air Base.	
1991	November 4–5	Tropical Storm Uring lashes into Eastern Visayas, leaving 8,000 people dead as a result of widespread flooding in the coastal city of Ormoc, Leyte.	
1991		Terrorist group Abu Sayyaf is founded by Abdurajak Janjalani, separated from the Moro National Liberation Front (MNLF) in which he was a former member.	
1992	January	Former First Lady Marcos is arrested and later released on charges regarding her accounts in Switzerland.	
1992	March 16	Provincehood of Sarangani (Republic Act No. 7228), separating from South Cotabato.	
1992	May 11	1992 Philippine general election, the first under the 1987 Constitution (Fidel V. Ramos and Joseph E. Estrada are elected president and vice president, respectively.)	
1992	May 11	Biliran province was established through RA 7160.	
1992	May 22	Guimaras province was established through RA 7160.	
1992	September 30	U.S. forces leave Subic Bay Naval Base upon its turn over to the Philippines.	
1992	November 24	Subic Bay Naval Base closes as it is turned over to the local government, with a last batch of American soldiers finally leaving Naval Air Station Cubi Point and returning to the U.S., ending its military presence in the country.	
1992		Pres. Ramos signs the Anti-Subversion Act of 1992.	
1993	July 2	A floating pagoda sinks in the annual Bocaue River Festival in Bocaue, Bulacan, 279 devotees drown.	
1993	September	Marcos funeral: Remains of former Pres. Marcos return in the country upon permission from the government; are interred later in his hometown of Batac.	
1993	September 24	Former First Lady Imelda Marcos is found by Sandiganbayan guilty of corruption and sentenced to 18–24 years in prison.	
1993	December	Numerous bomb attacks in Davao City, targeting a church and two mosques, kill at least two and injure 150.	
1993		Pres. Ramos signs Republic Act 7659 reinstating capital punishment for selected crimes, which is banned in the 1987 Constitution.	
1994	January	The government and the Moro National Liberation Front sign a ceasefire agreement, aiming to end guerrilla war.	
1994	March 29	The Philippines first makes its connection to the Internet, with Philippine Network Foundation connects to the United States' Sprint via a 64 kbit/s link.	
1994	June	A5-day conference on East Timor held in Manila ends with an agreement to form a coalition for then Indonesian territory.	
1994	July	Abu Sayyaf group massacres 15 Christian civilians in Basilan and holds 19 others hostage; most of the captives are freed later following a rescue mission, while Lamitan parish priest Fr. Cirilo Nacorda is freed on August after being turned over by the group to the Moro National Liberation Front (MNLF).	
1994	October	Series of terror attacks of the MILF in parts of Cotabato result in the death of 50 people from both the rebel and government sides and displace thousands from four municipalities.	
1994	November 15	Mindoro earthquake	
1994	December 2	Singaporean freighter Kota Suria and ferry MV Cebu City collides in Manila Bay, killing about 140.	
1994	December 11	Abomb explodes on board a Philippine Airlines plane during a test run as part of the Bojinka plot, a planned attack for the assassination of Pope John Paul II during his 1995 visit, killing a passenger.	
1994		Abu Sayyaf launches a series of bombings in Zamboanga City, killing 71.	
1995	January	Bojinka plot is discovered following a chemical fire in an apartment in Manila.	
1995	January 10–15	Pope John Paul II visits the Philippines and presides over the country's first World Youth Day in Manila.	
1995	February	Philippine Navy sights ships and structures being built, all by the Chinese, in Mischief Reef (Panganiban Reef) in the South China Sea off Palawan; causing Manila to file legal diplomatic actions against Beijing over continuous occupation of the Kalayaan Island Group, and further resistance between the Philippines and China.	
1995	February 14	Old Kalinga-Apayao is divided into separate provinces of Kalinga and Apayao. (Republic Act No. 7878)	
1995	April 3	Abu Sayyaf rebels raid Ipil town, wherein they burn the town center and kill 53 people.	
1995	April 30	President Ramos inaugurated the opening of Subic International Airport (formerly a United States military base). This indicates growth after the removal of military bases in the country.	
1995	May 17	Kuratong Baleleng case	
1995	October 31	Super Typhoon Rosing	
1995	November 27	The construction of the Skyway project was initiated, the biggest infrastructure project in the country that was intended to ease the flow of traffic in Metro Manila.	
1996	March 18	Fire razes Ozone Disco Bar in Quezon City, killing more than 158, including students.	
1996	March 24	Marcopper mining disaster in Marinduque occurs; one of the largest mining disasters in history.	
1996	September 2	The Final Peace Agreement between the Philippine Government and the Moro National Liberation Front (MNLF), led by Nur Misuari, is signed at the Malacañan Palace; implementing the 1976 Tripoli Agreement.	
1996	November 24–25	8th Asia-Pacific Economic Cooperation (APEC) Summit was held in Subic.	
1997	July	Asian financial crisis hits the country; causes decreasing economic growth in the Philippines.	
1997	October 29	Pres. Ramos signs Indigenous Peoples' Rights Act (Republic Act No. 8371), with the creation of National Commission on Indigenous Peoples (NCIP).	
1998	January 30	Provincehood of Compostela Valley (Republic Act No. 8470), separating from Davao del Norte.	
1998	February 2	A Cebu Pacific plane hits Mt. Sumagaya in Claveria, Misamis Oriental, killing 104 on board.	
1998	May 11	1998 Philippine general election (Joseph Estrada is elected)	
1998	June 12	Celebrations for Centennial of Philippine Independence begins, with 2-day activities held.	
1998	June–September	Dry spell felt in 16 regions amid country's four-year growth, with ₱9 billion worth of agricultural damages.	
1998	September 18	Passenger ferry Princess of the Orient sinks off Fortune Island during a typhoon, killing 150.	
1998		Abu Sayyaf founder Abdurajak Janjalani dies in a police encounter.	
1999	February 5	Rape convict Leo Echegaray is executed by lethal injection at the New Bilibid Prison in Muntinlupa; the first Filipino to be meted the death penalty since its reinstatement in 1993; yet the country's first public execution since 1976, and also of that method.	
1999	May	New Visiting Forces Agreement (VFA) with the United States is ratified by the Senate, returning American military presence in the country.	
1999	August 3	About 60 people died and 378 houses buried when a massive landslide, caused by Typhoon Olga (Ising), occurs in Cherry Hills subdivision in Antipolo, Rizal.	

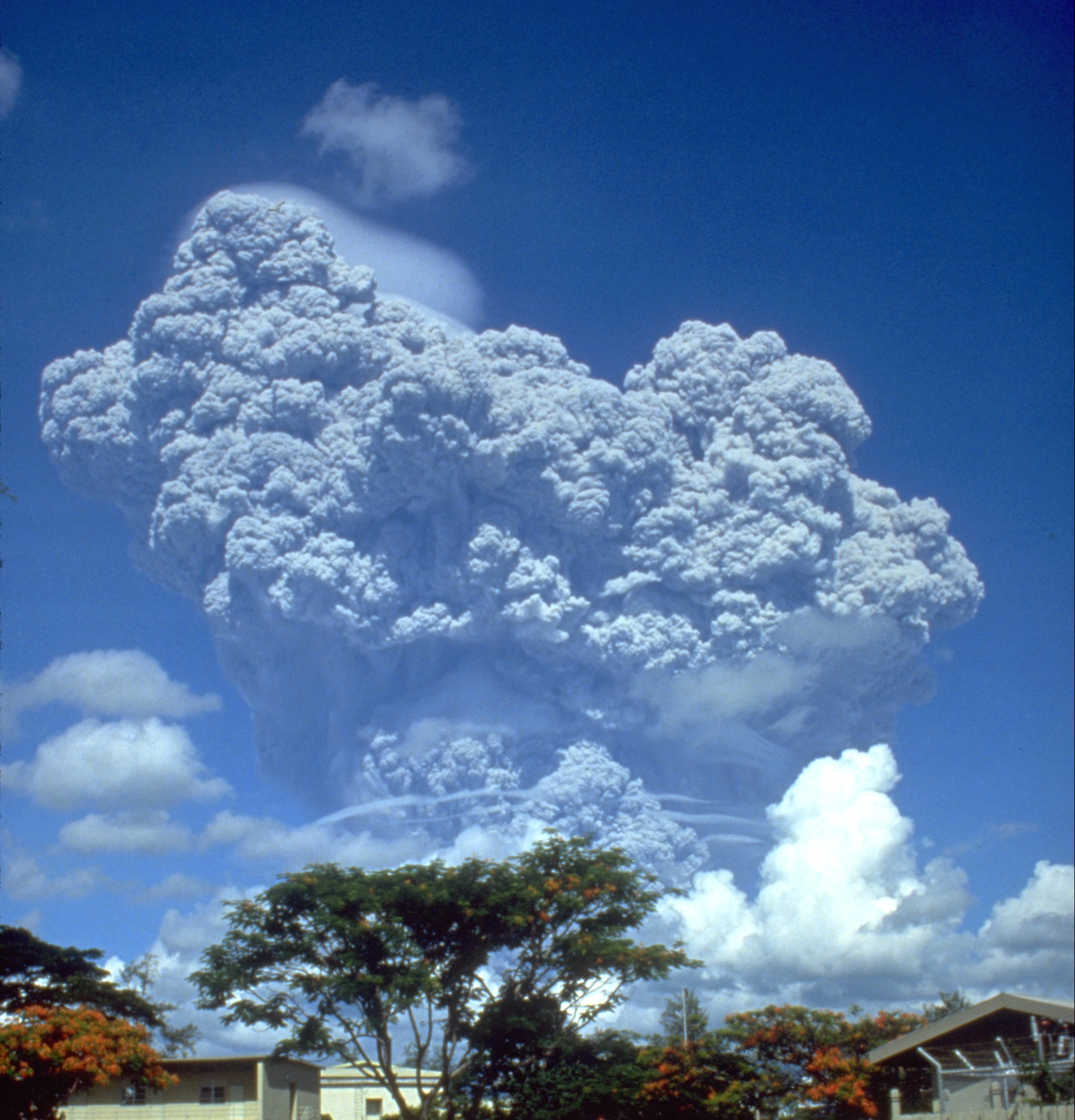
The eruption column of Mount Pinatubo on June 12, 1991, three days before the climactic eruption.

== 21st century ==
=== 2000s ===
Year	Date	Event	Source
2000	January 4	Convicted rapist Alex Bartolome becomes the last person to be executed in the country. Capital punishment is abolished in 2006 under the presidency of Gloria Macapagal Arroyo.	
2000	March 15	Pres. Estrada's government declares an "all-out-war" against the Moro Islamic Liberation Front (MILF).	
2000	April 19	An Air Philippines plane crashes in the hills of Island Garden City of Samal, Davao del Norte, killing all 131 on board; the worst aviation disaster in country's history.	
2000	April 12	Cargo vessel Annahada sinks off Jolo Island, killing 159.	
2000	April 23	Twenty-one foreigners are abducted by Abu Sayyaf extremists from Sipadan Island, Malaysia and are later brought to Jolo Island; hostage crisis lasts five months.	
2000	May	A computer virus is released by a student, damaging around 45 million computers worldwide.	
2000	May 25	A Philippine Airlines plane is hijacked by an armed man, who later died in a failed jump attempt.	
2000	July 9	Fall of Camp Abubakar: Camp Abubakar in Maguindanao is captured by the Armed Forces of the Philippines (AFP) from the Moro Islamic Liberation Front (MILF), as part of a campaign against Moro insurgency in Mindanao.	
2000	July 10	More than 200 people are killed in a trash slide in Payatas, Quezon City.	
2000	November 13	Pres. Estrada is the first incumbent president to be impeached by House of Representatives on accusations regarding jueteng money;	
2000	December 7	The Senate formally initiates the impeachment trial against Pres. Estrada presided by Chief Justice Hilario Davide Jr.	
2000	December 30	Rizal Day bombings: Series of terrorist bombings occur in Metro Manila, with 22 fatalities and more than 120 injuries.	
2001	January 16–20	EDSA II Revolution ousts Pres. Estrada; Vice-Pres. Gloria Macapagal Arroyo becomes the 14th president of the Philippines.: January 16 – Prosecutors of the trial walk out after senators voted, 11–10, not to open the second envelope containing the documents of evidences against Pres. Estrada, regarding his supposed link to a bank account purportedly containing kickbacks from an illegal numbers game; crowd start to gather in the People Power Shrine and conduct the mass rallies, calling for his resignation.; January 17 – Impeachment trial aborted.; January 19 – High-ranking military and police officials, including Defense Secy. Orlando Mercado, AFP Chief of Staff Gen. Angelo Reyes and PNP Chief Dir. Gen. Panfilo Lacson, withdraw from the Estrada administration.; January 20 – Pres. Estrada resigns and leaves Malacañang. Vice-Pres. Macapagal Arroyo is sworn into office by Chief Justice Davide at Our Lady of EDSA Shrine in Mandaluyong; thus, the nation's second woman President.	
2001	March	Moro Islamic Liberation Front declares ceasefire with the government.	
2001	April 25	Former Pres. Estrada, charged with plunder while in office, and his son Jinggoy are arrested following an arrest warrant issued by Sandiganbayan with their co-accused.	
2001	April 30 – May 1	EDSA III: Supporters of former Pres. Estrada stage protest following his arrest, ending in a violent dispersal and riots on the 1st, killing four.	
2001	May 27	Dos Palmas Resort kidnappings: Twenty hotel staff and guests, mostly tourists, are seized by the Islamist terrorist group Abu Sayyaf members from the Dos Palmas Resort in Honda Bay, Palawan; hostage crisis lasts for more than 12 months.	
2001		Lamitan Siege: Abu Sayyaf takes a church and a hospital in Lamitan, Basilan hostage, with captives brought from Palawan, wherein four of them are reportedly escaped, and 20 more people; terrorists escape military operation.	
2001	November	A rebellion in Sulu and Zamboanga City, staged by several MNLF commanders loyal to Nur Misuari, is suppressed by AFP.	
2001		Another plebiscite is held in ARMM (by virtue of RA 9054) for its expansion, resulting in inclusion of Basilan province and Marawi City.	
2002	February 26	Former Pres. Estrada admits signing ₱500 million Jose Velarde bank account in Equitable-PCI Bank.	
2002	March 5	Mindanao earthquake	
2002	June 7	A rescue operation for the remaining Abu Sayyaf captives, held since 2001, is launched by the Special Forces of the Armed Forces of the Philippines (AFP) in an area in Zamboanga del Norte, with a gun battle resulting in the deaths of Martin Burnham and Ediborah Yap; only Gracia Burnham survived.	
2002	June 21	Death of Abu Sabaya, leader of Abu Sayyaf.	
2002	August	Abu Sayyaf kidnaps six Filipino members of a Christian group, two of them later beheaded.	
2002	October	Series of bombings, allegedly by the Abu Sayyaf, take place in Manila and Zamboanga cities.	
2003	February 11	Government soldiers' attempt to disband a terrorist kidnap group "Pentagon Gang" results in a 3-day encounter that killed about 135 MILF fighters in their base near Pikit town.	
2003	July 27	Oakwood mutiny: Magdalo Group, led by Army Capt. Gerardo Gambala and LtSG. Antonio Trillanes IV, takes a mutiny at Oakwood Premier apartments in Makati.	
2004	February 27	SuperFerry 14 is bombed by then Jemaah Islamiyah-linked Abu Sayyaf, then sinks near Manila Bay, killing 116; deadliest terrorist attack in Philippine history.	
2004	May 10	2004 Philippine general election (incumbent Pres. Gloria Macapagal Arroyo elected to a six-year term)	
2004	November 16	Hacienda Luisita massacre takes place, 14 people die in clashes with police.	
2004	November 20 – December 2	Cyclones Muifa (Unding), Merbok (Violeta), Winnie and Nanmadol (Yoyong) hit the country, affecting million people, causing massive fatalities and damages.: In November, a tropical depression (Winnie) kills more than 1,500 people, causes damages of estimated ₱679 million (US$15.8 million).; Cyclone Nanmadol (Yoyong) strikes the country, killing 70 people.	
2005	February 14	Valentine's Day bombings: Three explosions occur in the cities of Makati, Davao, and General Santos, resulting to, in total, 8 deaths and at least 90 injuries; Abu Sayyaf claims responsibility for the attacks.	
2005	June 6	Hello Garci scandal (Legitimacy of declared election winners questioned): Audio recordings, containing a conversation believed to be between Pres. Macapagal Arroyo and Election Commissioner Virgilio Garcillano, are released by media to the public, revealing the allegations of cheating in 2004 national elections.	
2005	September 6	Congress rejects impeachment complaints against Pres. Macapagal Arroyo in what would be the longest Lower House session in country's history.	
2005	November	Reformed Value Added Tax Act (also called Expanded VAT) is implemented, after being delayed for months, as a solution to the government's fiscal crisis.	
2006	February 17	A landslide from an entire mountainside occurs in Guinsaugon village in Southern Leyte, following continuous heavy rains and an earthquake, causing damages and 1,126 deaths.	
2006	February 24	Pres. Macapagal Arroyo places the entire country under state of emergency (Proclamation 1017) in response to coup rumours.	
2006	May 18	Mountaineer Leo Oracion reached the summit of Mount Everest via the Nepalese side.	
2006	June 24	Pres. Macapagal Arroyo signs Republic Act 9346 abolishing capital punishment in the country.	
2006	August 11	Vessel M/T Solar I sinks off the coast of Guimaras, resulting to an oil spill, causing widespread environmental damage.	
2006	September 28	Typhoon Xangsane (Milenyo) struck Luzon, killing at least 200 and causing agricultural damages.	
2006	October 2	Provincehood of Dinagat Islands (Republic Act No. 9355), separating from Surigao del Norte.	
2006	November 25–30	Typhoon Durian (Reming) kills at least 720 people, with damages at US$130 million; triggers a massive landslide from the Mayon volcano in Legazpi City on the 30th, causing additional 800–1,000 casualties.	
2006	December 4	Makati Regional Trial Court convicts American serviceman LCpl. Daniel Smith and acquits three co-accused for their involvement in the 2005 Subic rape case.	
2006		Death of Khadaffy Janjalani, Abu Sayyaf leader.	
2007	March	Rep. Satur Ocampo is arrested and charged with murder allegedly committed on a purge of suspected spies in the CPP–NPA occurred then, later released.	
2007	March	The Permanent Peoples' Tribunal in The Hague finds the Arroyo administration responsible for unsolved killings and disappearances in the country.	
2007	April 20	A contract is signed by the Philippine and Chinese governments for a proposed National Broadband Network, which was later found to be corrupted.	
2007	July 11	Fourteen Marine soldiers are found beheaded following an encounter between government forces and Islamic rebels Moro Islamic Liberation Front (MILF) and, allegedly, Abu Sayyaf, in Tipo-Tipo, Basilan.	
2007	August 28	Exiled Communist Party of the Philippines founding chairman Jose Maria Sison is arrested at Utrecht, Netherlands.	
2007	September 12	Sandiganbayan and the Office of the Ombudsman convicts former Pres. Estrada for plunder and sentences him to reclusion perpetua, but acquits him and his co-accused on other charges.	
2007	October 19	An explosion at Glorietta mall in Makati kills 11 and injures at least 100.	
2007	October 26	Former Pres. Joseph Estrada is pardoned and freed from jail after his trial.	
2007	November 29	The Armed Forces lays siege to The Peninsula Manila following a mutiny staged by soldiers.	
2007	December 6	Fourteen Abu Sayyaf members are convicted by the Pasig Regional Trial Court regarding the 2001 kidnapping incident in Palawan.	
2007		MNLF leader Nur Misuari is arrested in Malaysia following rebellion charges filed against him.	
2008	February 8	Jun Lozada testifies before the Philippine Senate in connection with the National Broadband Network contract deal.	
2008	March 6	Several Congress members call for an investigation into a joint oil exploration agreement on 2004 between the Philippines, China, and Vietnam over the disputed Spratly Islands, claiming it unconstitutional.	
2008	March 11	Former First Lady Imelda Marcos is acquitted by a Manila trial court of 32 counts of illegal money transfers.	
2008	March 17	The United States Supreme Court hears oral arguments on a certiorari petition filed by the government, invoking sovereign immunity regarding the enforcement against former Pres. Marcos' estate.	
2008	June 20–23	Typhoon Fengshen (Frank) makes landfall in Samar on the 20th; devastates Central Visayas; kills at least 557 people and affects more than 99,600 families in some regions, with damages at ₱4.37 billion (US$101.2 million).	
2008	June 21	Passenger ferry MV Princess of the Stars capsizes and sinks off San Fernando, Romblon in Sibuyan Island during a typhoon, 814 of its total number of passengers and crew are either dead or missing.	
2008	August 25	Peace talks between the government and the Moro Islamic Liberation Front collapse after the memorandum of Agreement on Ancestral Domain is declared by the Supreme Court unconstitutional.	
2008	October	Euro Generals scandal	
2008		CARPER (CARP Extension with Reforms) Act is passed, reforming CARP and extending it until 2014.	
2009	January 15	Three International Committee of the Red Cross volunteers are kidnapped by the rebel group Abu Sayyaf	
2009	March	Philippine Archipelagic Baselines Act (Republic Act 9522) is signed into law by Pres. Macapagal Arroyo, ensuring international recognition of the country's territorial boundaries.	
2009	April 23	Court of Appeals acquits LCpl. Daniel Smith in connection with Subic rape case, reversing the 2006 decision, ordering his release.	
2009	September 26	Typhoon Ketsana (Ondoy) is the most devastating typhoon to hit the country since Typhoon Patsy (Yoling), affecting Manila, with damages of $1.09 billion and 747 fatalities.	
2009	October	Typhoon Parma (Pepeng) hits the country, affecting millions of people, causing $617 million in damages and 500 fatalities.	
2009	November 23	Maguindanao massacre: Fifty-eight people being part of a convoy, including clan members and 32 journalists, are killed and buried in a mass grave in Ampatuan town by an estimated 100 gunmen belonging to a victims' political rival; single deadliest attack against journalists in world history.	
2009	December 4	Pres. Macapagal Arroyo places Maguindanao under a state of martial law in connection with the murder incident; lifts it eight days later.	
2009		MNLF leader Nur Misuari is acquitted in connection to the 2001 rebellion.	

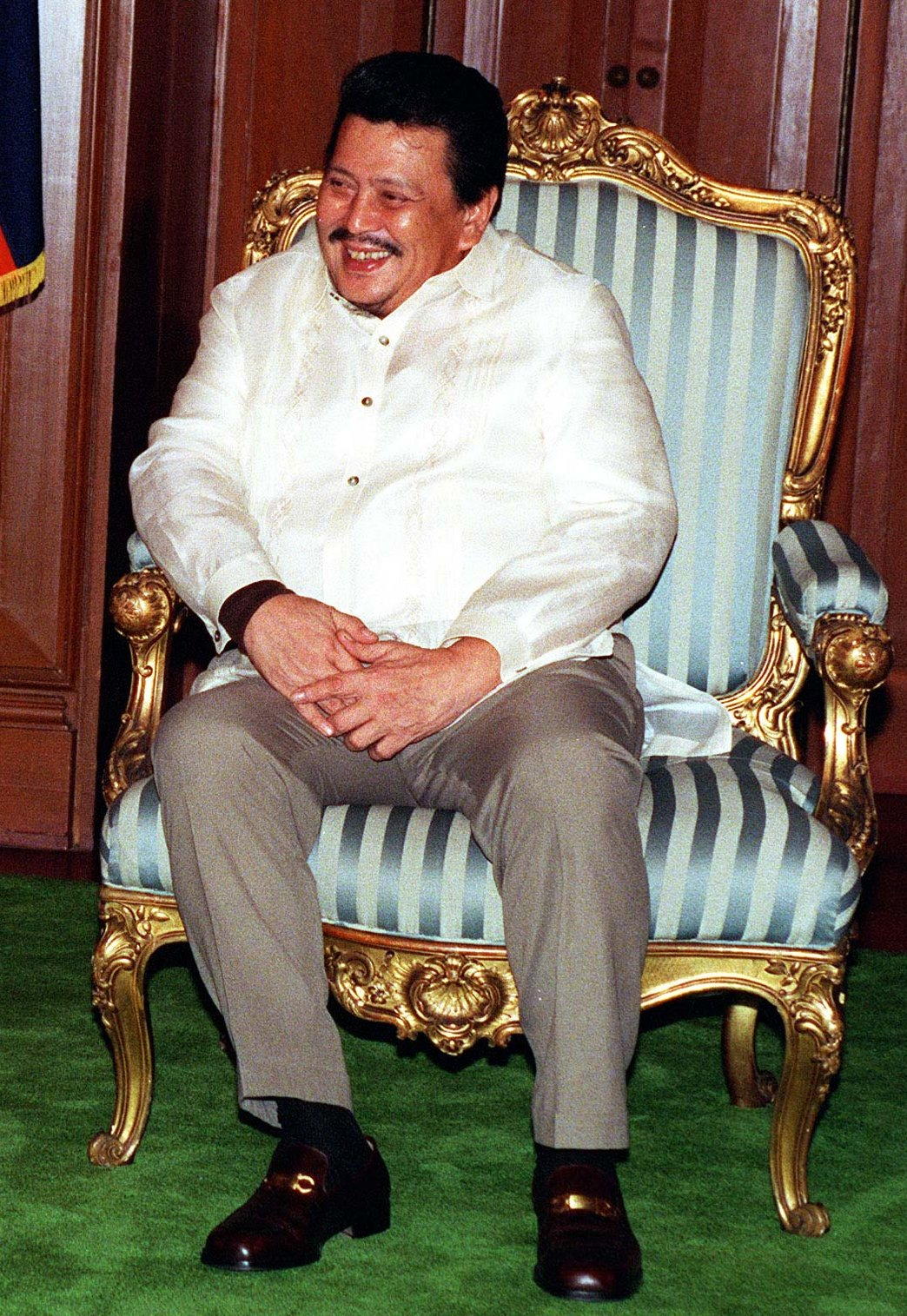
Joseph Estrada is the first president to be impeached by the House of Representatives

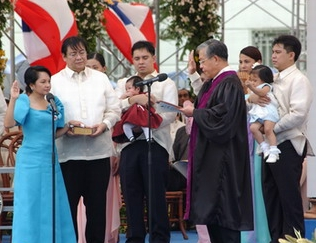
Gloria Macapagal Arroyo, the 14th President of the Philippines.

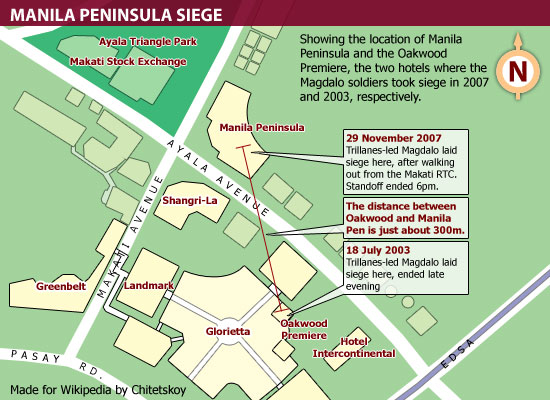
Location of Oakwood Premiere and the Manila Peninsula Hotel in Makati. These hotels had become the location of the Magdalo mutiny of 2003 and 2007, respectively

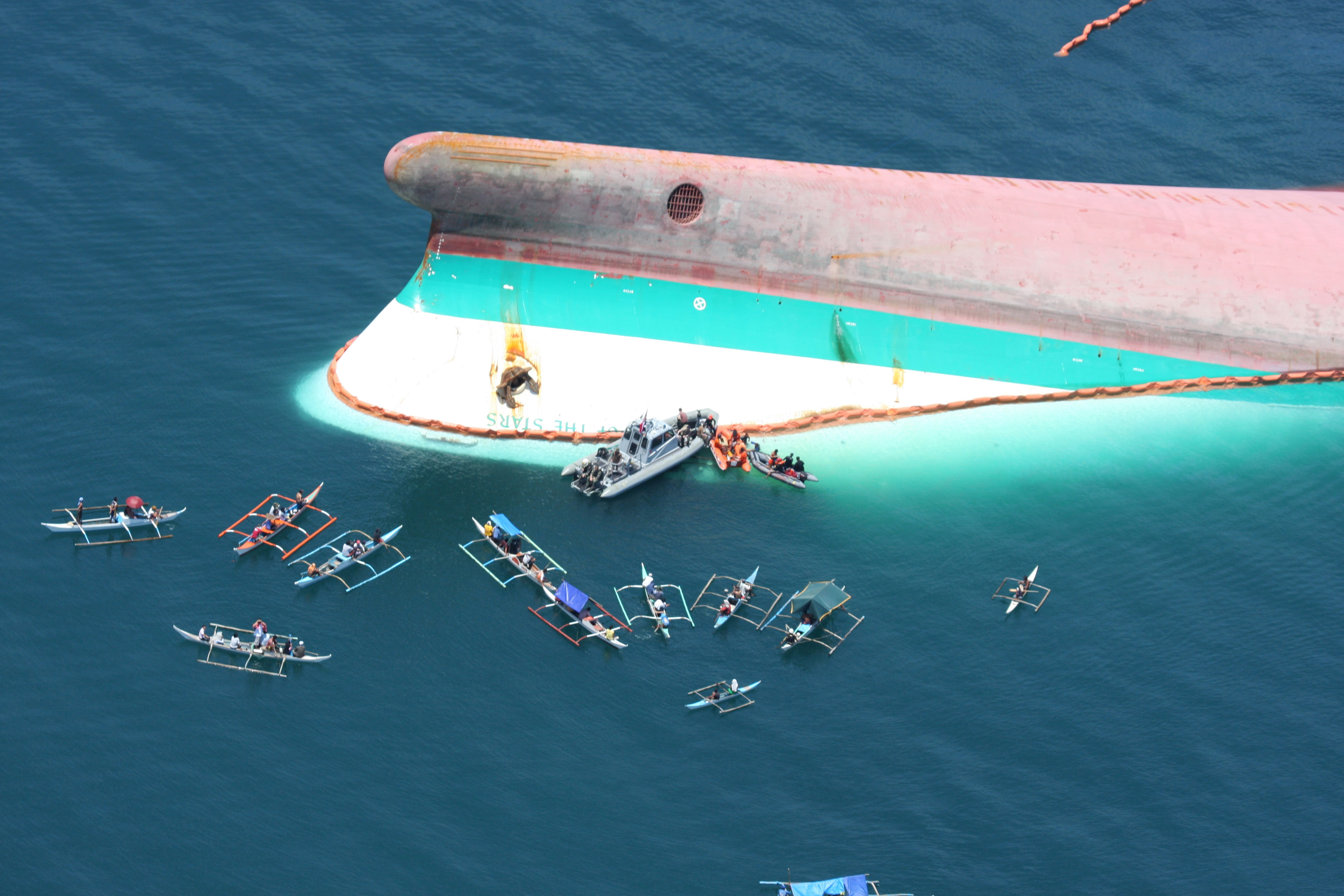
MV Princess of the Stars which had capsized on June 21, 2008, at the height of Typhoon Frank.

=== 2010s ===
Year	Date	Event	Source
2010	May 10	The 2010 Philippine general elections, also the first national computerized election in the Philippine history, took place. (Benigno Aquino III is elected president)	
2010	August 23	A hostage-taking incident at the Quirino Grandstand ends in a gunfight that killed a perpetrator and eight hostages.	
2010	October 16–18	Typhoon Juan, officially as Typhoon Megi, hits northeastern Luzon at Sierra Madre, creating widespread damage over Luzon.	
2011	July 26	Supreme Court declares creation of a Truth Commission (Executive Order No. 1) unconstitutional.	
2011	November 11	Puerto Princesa Underground River is named as one of the world's New7Wonders of Nature.	
2011	November 18	Electoral sabotage charges are filed by Comelec against former Pres. Macapagal Arroyo, arrested on the same day, and the co-accused at the Pasay Regional Trial Court in connection to allegations of electoral fraud.	
2011	December	Tropical Storm Washi (Sendong) causes flash floods, leaving 1,080 people dead and affecting Cagayan de Oro and Iligan cities.	
2012	February	An earthquake with 6.9 magnitude hits Visayas islands causing damages.	
2012	April	An attempt of the Philippine Navy to detain Chinese fishermen caught on the Scarborough Shoal is blocked by China, escalating a diplomatic standoff over the area.	
2012	April 24	Supreme Court votes to distribute Hacienda Luisita lands to its farmers.	
2012	May 29	Senators vote, 20–3, to convict Chief Justice Corona guilty in the second article of the impeachment case regarding alleged undisclosed wealth, removing him from office.	
2012	September	Cybercrime Prevention Act (Republic Act 10175) is signed into law by Pres. Aquino.	
2012	October 15	The Framework Agreement on the Bangsamoro is signed by the Philippine Government and the Moro Islamic Liberation Front (MILF), aiming to end war in the southern Philippines and also for the creation of a new autonomous political entity, Bangsamoro, replacing the Autonomous Region in Muslim Mindanao.	
2012	October 21	Canonization of Pedro Calungsod as second Filipino saint	
2012	December 3	Typhoon Bopha (Pablo) makes landfall on Mindanao, affecting Compostela Valley and Davao Oriental, with more than 600 fatalities and damages estimated at more than US$1 billion.	
2012	December 21	Reproductive Health Bill (Republic Act 10354) is signed into law by Pres. Aquino.	
2013	May 15	The Enhanced Basic Education Act of 2013, commonly known as K–12 program was signed.	
2013	July 27	The United Federated States of Bangsamoro Republik (UFSBR) declares its independence from the Philippines	
2013	August 16	Passenger ship MV St. Thomas Aquinas and cargo ship Sulpicio Express Siete collide in Cebu Strait, killing 115.	
2013	September	MNLF commander Ustadz Habier Malik launches an attack on Zamboanga City, leaving more than 200 people dead.	
2013	September 28	The UFSBR ceases to exists as it is defeated in the Zamboanga City crisis.	
2013	October 15	A magnitude 7.2 earthquake, whose released energy is found equivalent to 32 Hiroshima bombs, strikes Bohol province, affecting Central Visayas, with 222 people died; the country's deadliest earthquake since 1990.	
2013	October 28	Davao Occidental was founded, separating from Davao del Sur; country's 81st province.	
2013	November 8	Super Typhoon Haiyan (Yolanda) landfalls in Visayas and devastates the country, whose winds caused storm surges that severely flooded Eastern and Central Visayan coasts, with Samar (Guiuan town) and Leyte (Tacloban City) among the most affected; death toll of at least 6,300; majority of about 11 million people reportedly affected are left homeless; one of the strongest tropical cyclones to hit the country, and the deadliest typhoon on record.	
2014	March 27	The Comprehensive Agreement on the Bangsamoro was signed.	
2014	March 30	Philippine government files a memorandum in the United Nations arbitration court regarding the shoals and reefs in the South China Sea.	
2014	May 23	The Philippines and Indonesia signed a maritime treaty that draws the boundary of the two countries' overlapping Exclusive Economic Zone in Mindanao and Celebes seas.	
2014	July 21	Philippine Arena is inaugurated in Bocaue, Bulacan, the "largest mixed-use indoor theater."	
2014	July 27	Philippines marks a milestone in its population growth identifying the birth of a baby girl in a Manila hospital as the 100 millionth Filipino.	
2014	September 10	President Aquino III lead the handover of the draft of the Bangsamoro Basic Law to the Senate and House leaders in a historical turnover ceremony at the Malacañang.	
2014	December 8	Vigan City, Ilocos Sur is chosen as one of the world's New7Wonders Cities.	
2014		Enhanced Defense Cooperation Agreement (EDCA) signed, maintaining rotational American military presence in the country.	
2015	January 15–19	Papal visit of Pope Francis in the Philippines, with a special Mass held at the Tacloban airport on the 17th.	
2015	January 25	Mamasapano clash: An encounter between police commandos and the MILF occurs in a police operation in Mamasapano, Maguindanao (now in Maguindanao del Sur), aiming to capture international terrorist Marwan; leading to, in total, 74 deaths including 44 PNP–SAF officers	
2015	February 25	The AFP declared its all-out offensive campaign against the MILF break away group, the Bangsamoro Islamic Freedom Fighters.	
2015	April 14	Death of Ameril Umbra Kato, the founding leader of the Bangsamoro Islamic Freedom Fighters.	
2015	May 29	Pres. Aquino signs Executive Order 183, creating the Negros Island Region.	
2015	June 28	Death of Kumander Parago, the top commander of the New People's Army.	
2015	October 18	Typhoon Koppu (Lando) hits northern and central Luzon, creating widespread damage and floods over Luzon.	
2015	December 1	LCpl. Joseph Scott Pemberton is convicted by the court for the death of a transgender in 2014.	
2015	December 21 (PHL)	Pia Alonzo Wurtzbach is crowned Miss Universe 2015 in Las Vegas, Nevada; the country's first title after 42 years.	
2016	January	Supreme Court declares the EDCA as constitutional.	
2016	February 10	The National Mapping and Resource Information Authority announces that it has documented more than 400 additional islands.	
2016	March 23	Diwata-1 was launched to the International Space Station aboard the Cygnus spacecraft on a supply mission.	
2016	April 9	Twenty-three soldiers and Abu Sayyaf bandits, including a Moroccan jihadist, are killed in a gunfight between government troops and a terrorist group in Tipo-Tipo, Basilan.	
2016	May 9	2016 Philippine general election (Rodrigo Duterte is elected as the first President from Mindanao)	
2016	July 1	An intensified nationwide anti-drug campaign is launched by President Rodrigo Duterte.	
2016	July 12	The Permanent Court of Arbitration rules in favor of the Philippines against China over territorial disputes in the South China Sea.	
2016	July 19	The Supreme Court acquits former president Gloria Macapagal Arroyo of her plunder case regarding the alleged misuse of funds for the PCSO in an 11–4 ruling.	
2016	July 23	President Duterte signs an executive order for the implementation of the Freedom of Information (FOI).	
2016	August 1	Launch of the 911 emergency number and 8888 civil service complaint hotline	
2016	October 19	Typhoon Haima (Lawin). Typhoon signal number 5 raised for the first time.	
2016	November 18	The controversial burial of Ferdinand Marcos at the Libingan ng mga Bayani	
2017	January 5	Death of Mohammad Jaafar Maguid, the leader of Ansar Al-Khilafah Philippines.	
2017	January 11	Pres. Duterte signed an executive order mandating universal access to modern family planning tools.	
2017	February 5	President Rodrigo Duterte designates the Communist Party of the Philippines-New Peoples Army (CPP-NPA) as a terrorist organization following attacks and kidnappings of soldiers by NPA members amid the imposed ceasefire between the government and the communist rebels.	
2017	February 24	Arrest of Leila de Lima for violations of Republic Act 9165, (Comprehensive Dangerous Drugs Act of 2002) related to her alleged involvement in the New Bilibid Prison drug trafficking scandal.	
2017	February 28	Philippines' signing of the Paris Agreement on Climate Change.	
2017	May 16	Pres. Rodrigo Duterte signed Executive Order No. 25, that renamed Benham Rise to Philippine Rise.	
2017	May 16	Pres. Rodrigo Duterte signed Executive Order No. 26, that ordered a nationwide smoking ban.	
2017	May 23	Pres. Duterte declares a 60-day martial law in Mindanao (via Proclamation No. 216) following clashes between government forces and the Maute group in Marawi City.	
2017	July 22	Congress votes to extend martial law in Mindanao until the end of 2017 as siege in Marawi City continues.	
2017	October 16	Abu Sayyaf leader Isnilon Hapilon and Maute group leader Omar Maute are killed by government troops in an assault.	
2017	October 17	Pres. Duterte declares the liberation of Marawi City, with more than a thousand reportedly killed in the battle.	
2018	July 26	The Bangsamoro Organic Law is signed into law by President Rodrigo Duterte, effectively abolishing the Autonomous Region in Muslim Mindanao and providing for the basic structure of government for the Bangsamoro Autonomous Region in Muslim Mindanao.	

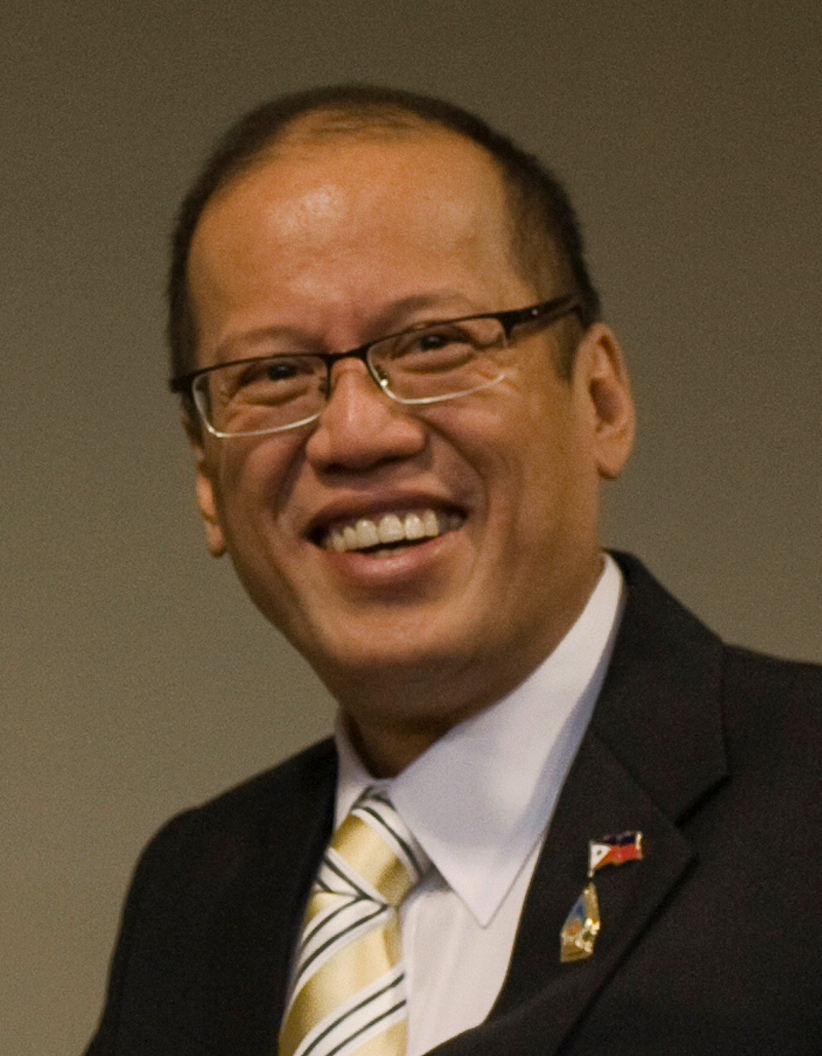
Benigno Aquino III, the 15th President of the Philippines.

Territorial disputes in the South China Sea

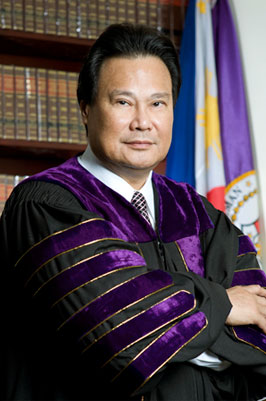
Renato Corona is the first Chief Justice to be impeached by the House of Representatives.

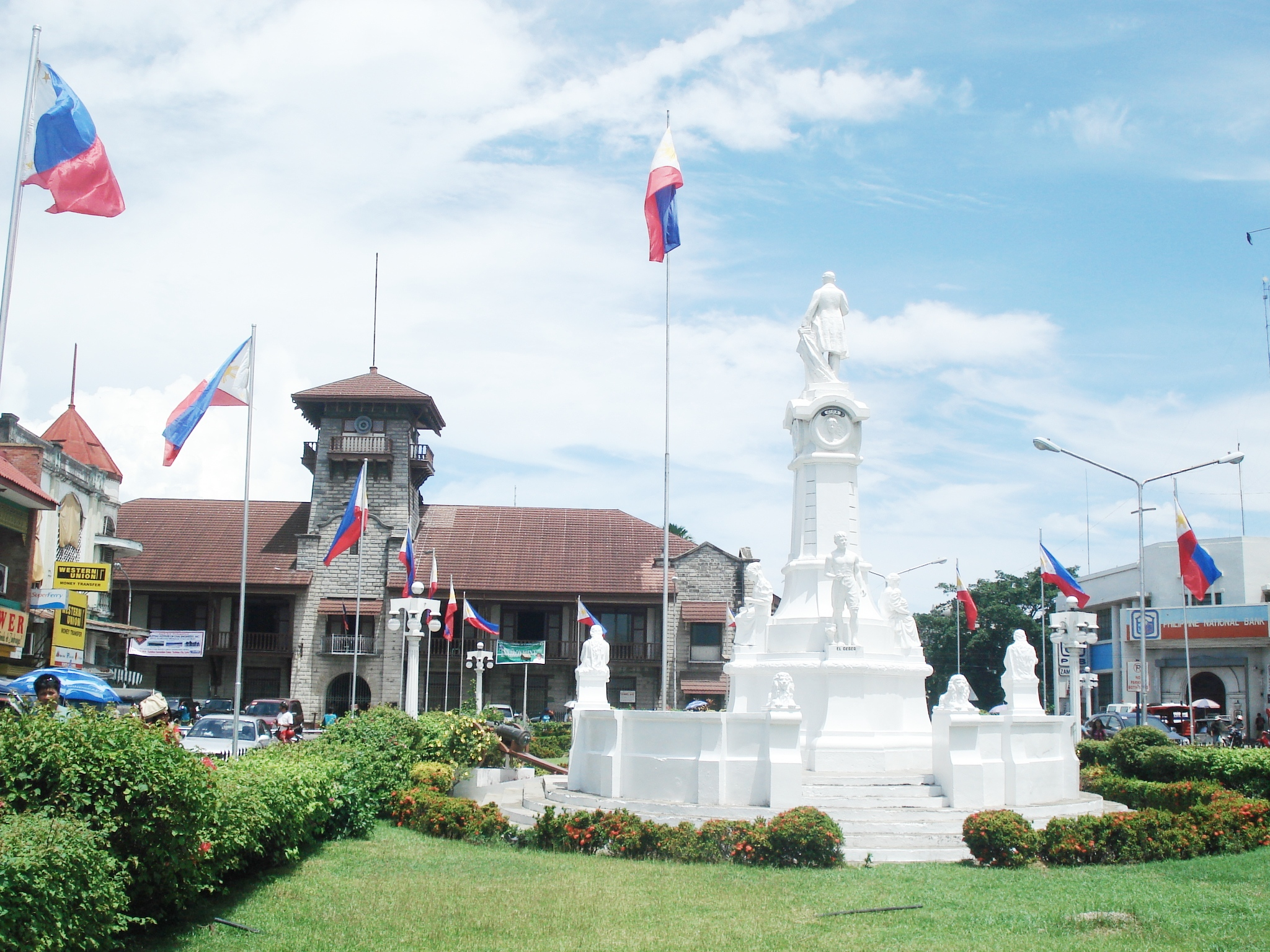
The Zamboanga City Hall where the MNLF intended to hoist the Bangsamoro Republik flag in the height of Zamboanga City crisis.

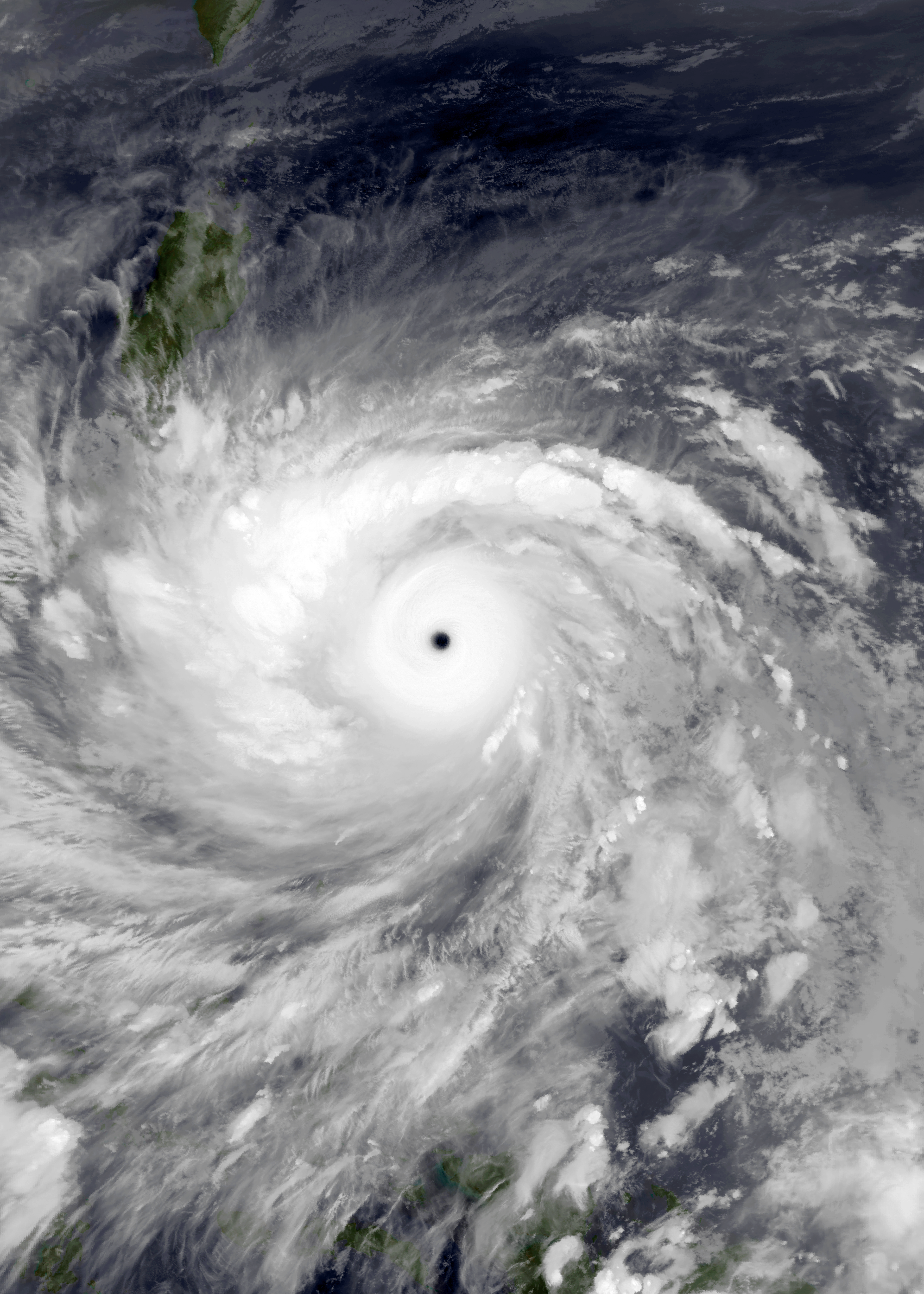
Typhoon Haiyan also known as Yolanda was the strongest typhoon in the Philippines.

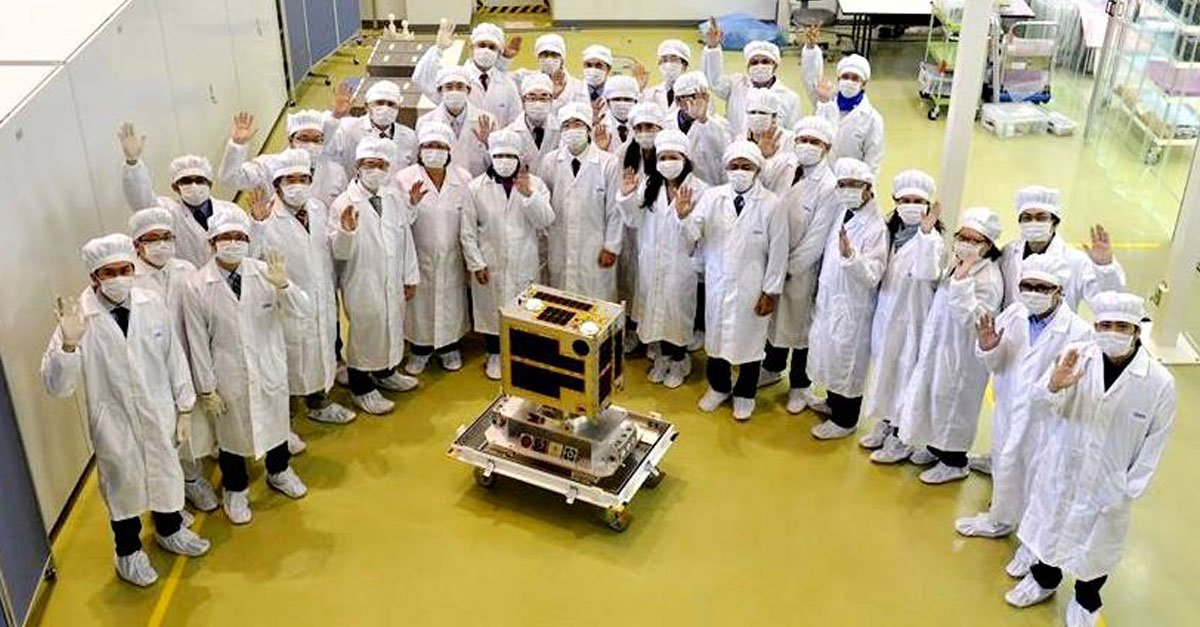
Diwata-1 also known as PHL-Microsat-1 is a Philippine microsatellite launched to the International Space Station (ISS) on March 23, 2016, and was deployed into orbit from the ISS on April 27, 2016. It is the first Philippine microsatellite and the first satellite built and designed by Filipinos.

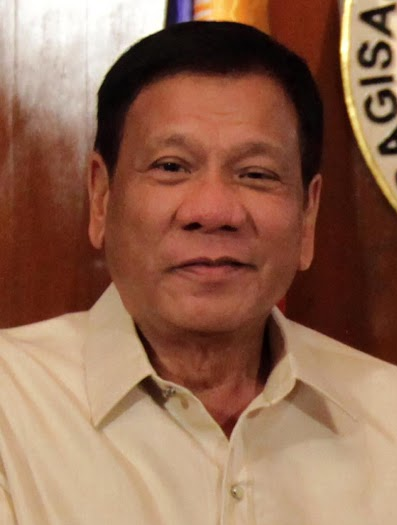
Rodrigo Duterte, the 16th President of the Philippines.

The Permanent Court of Arbitration ruled in favor of the Philippines against China over territorial disputes in the South China Sea.

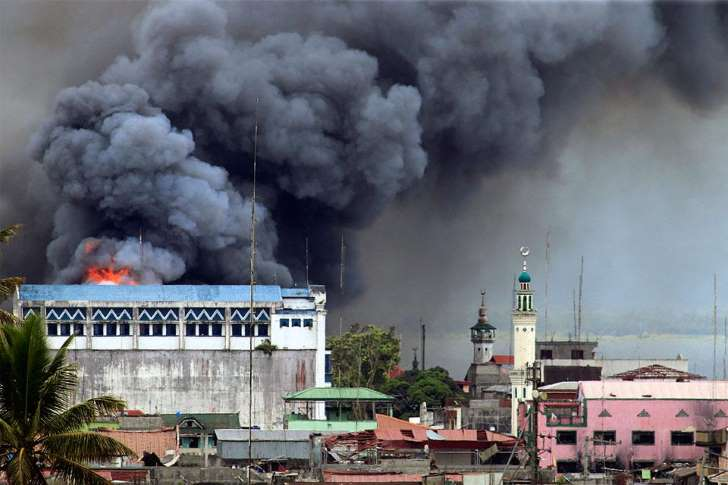
A building in Marawi is set ablaze by air strikes carried out by the Philippine Air Force.

=== 2020s ===
Year	Date	Event	Source
2020	March 16	The island of Luzon placed under Enhanced Community Quarantine in response to the growing pandemic of coronavirus disease 2019 (COVID-19) in the country.	
2020	July 3	The Anti-Terrorism Act of 2020 is signed into law by President Rodrigo Duterte, giving more surveillance powers to government forces to curb terror threats and acts.	
2021	June 23	The Anti-Terrorism Council designates the National Democratic Front (NDF) as a terrorist organization, citing it as an "integral and inseparable part" of the CPP-NPA.	
2021	July 26	Hidilyn Diaz wins a gold medal at the Women's 55 kg event for weightlifting in Tokyo, Japan during the 2020 Tokyo Olympics. It is the Philippines' first Olympic gold medal.	
2022	May 9	The 2022 Philippine general election are held, marking the first majority win since the establishment of the Fifth Republic in 1987, the first presidential ticket to win together since 2004, and the return of the Marcos family to power since the People Power Revolution. (Bongbong Marcos is elected as President alongside his running mate, Sara Duterte, as Vice President)	
2025	March 11	Former president Rodrigo Duterte is arrested at Ninoy Aquino International Airport for an International Criminal Court warrant that charged him with crimes against humanity in relation to the Philippine drug war. He was then sent to the Hague to face trial.	
2025	September 4	Widespread demonstrations against corruption begin over the mismanagement of government funds in flood control projects. The protests are a part of wider Gen Z protests across Asia.	

== See also ==
- Timeline of Manila
- Timeline of the Philippine Revolution
- Timeline of the Philippine–American War
- List of disasters in the Philippines
- List of presidents of the Philippines
