= August 1987 Philippine coup attempt =

Failed military overthrow of President Corazon Aquino

Date	August 27-29, 1987
Location	Villamor Airbase, Camp Aguinaldo, Malacañang Palace and portions of Manila, Quezon City, Pampanga, Albay, Central Visayas and Cagayan
Result	Philippine government victory: Coup averted; Flight of Honasan and arrest of coup plotters, financiers and leaders but some were given amnesty later on

Belligerents
Philippines	Reform the Armed Forces Movement

Commanders and leaders
(Philippines) Corazon Aquino; Rafael Ileto; Fidel Ramos; Renato De Villa; Antonio Sotelo; Loven Abadia; Ramon Montaño; Eduardo Ermita; Rodolfo Biazon; Alfredo Lim; Voltaire Gazmin	Gregorio Honasan; Edgardo Abenina; Federico Pasion; Reynaldo Berroya; Rodolfo Aguinaldo

Military support
Armed Forces of the Philippines	RAM Loyalists from the AFP

Casualties and losses
- 53 dead (including civilians); 358 wounded

On August 28, 1987, a coup d'état against the government of Philippine President Corazon Aquino was staged by members of the Armed Forces of the Philippines (AFP) belonging to the Reform the Armed Forces Movement (RAM) led by Colonel Gregorio Honasan, who had been a former top aide of ousted Defense Minister Juan Ponce Enrile, one of the instigators of the People Power Revolution that brought Aquino to power in 1986. The coup was repelled by military forces loyal to Aquino within the day, although Honasan managed to escape.

The coup was the sixth such attempt to overthrow Aquino and marked her final break with RAM, whose mutiny against the regime of President Ferdinand Marcos helped propel her into office. It was also the deadliest instance of infighting within the Philippine military at the time until it was surpassed by a subsequent coup attempt in 1989, which was also launched by Honasan and RAM to overthrow Aquino.

== Background ==
The Reform the Armed Forces Movement (RAM) was a group of dissident soldiers and officers of the AFP that was formed in the latter years of the dictatorship of President Ferdinand Marcos. In 1986, some of these officers, led by Colonel Gringo Honasan and Defense Minister Juan Ponce Enrile launched a failed coup d'état against Marcos and were later joined by AFP Vice Chief of Staff Lieutenant-General Fidel Ramos, prompting a large number of civilians to attempt to prevent Marcos from wiping the RAM rebels out. This eventually snowballed into the People Power Revolution which ended the Marcos dictatorship and forced him into exile, replacing him with his electoral rival, Corazon Aquino.

However, RAM's relations with the new president gradually deteriorated, and the group was subsequently implicated in several coup attempts against her, one of which, the God Save the Queen Plot in November 1986, led to Enrile's dismissal as defense minister by Aquino, and the transfer of Honasan to Fort Magsaysay in Nueva Ecija, 200 km (120 mi) north of Manila. Incidentally, the base was the largest military reservation of the AFP, making it a convenient pool of recruits for RAM's plot.

=== Preparations for the coup ===
In Fort Magsaysay, Honasan was tasked with heading the Philippine Army Special Forces training school there and personally managed the Philippine Army's 1st Scout Ranger Regiment. Within a few months, the charismatic Honasan had won over his students whose training as commandos with tactical mobility made them an ideal coup force. Honasan then held back his students' graduation from his courses as part of his efforts to train and indoctrinate them for the coup, which was not noticed by his superior officers for several months.

A few days before the coup, Major General Renato De Villa, chief of the Philippine Constabulary (PC), received an intelligence report that a coup would be launched by soldiers from Fort Magsaysay. He immediately relayed the information to General Ramos, now the AFP Chief of Staff, who quickly planned a pre-emptive counteraction. Ramos alerted the Philippine Army's 5th Division to verify the report, and ordered Brigadier General Ramon Montaño, his deputy chief of staff for operations, to accompany him to Fort Magsaysay early on August 28, 1987 to check the situation themselves.

=== Reasons for the coup ===
Various statements broadcast by the rebels referred to "the overindulgence in politics which now pervades in society", the supposed mishandling of the communist insurgency, and the deplorable economic condition of the military rebels, as well as investigations by the Commission on Human Rights on the military as their reasons for launching the coup. Moreover, the situation coincided with rising discontent within the overall ranks of the AFP for the Aquino government, with a survey taken three months before the coup showing that 34% of officers agreed that "an incompetent civilian leader could justly be ousted by military men", versus 33% who disagreed.

== Coup ==
=== Advance on Manila ===
Government attempts to intercept the rebels were preempted when, on the evening of August 27, Honasan and his trainees rode south on commandeered buses, dozens of 6X6 trucks and three tanks along the North Diversion Road towards Manila. Their classroom blackboards were later found to have contained maps with the presidential offices at Malacañang Palace and AFP headquarters at Camp Aguinaldo in Quezon City marked as targets. By midnight, they were joined by troops from other nearby military camps near the Santa Rita tollgate in Guiguinto, Bulacan, and flew inverted Philippine flags symbolizing war. General Ramos subsequently said that the rebels aimed "to kill the President and her family," which was further highlighted by an intercepted radio message discovered by the Integrated National Police on August 27 mentioning Aquino's assassination by the end of the month.

In the early morning of August 28, the rebel convoy was spotted by government forces in Santa Maria, Bulacan, with an estimated strength of more than 2,000, all of them heavily armed. Upon hearing of the convoy's sighting, General Montaño concluded that the rebels would attack in half an hour. In response, the head of the Philippine Army, Major General Restituto Padilla Sr., immediately dispatched five tanks to reinforce Camp Aguinaldo. The convoy arrived in Manila at around 1:00 am.

=== Malacañang ===
RAM marked their arrival in Manila by firing their guns into the air, waking up many residents of the capital and alerting government forces to their whereabouts. Honasan led one column on a night attack on Malacañang while leaving two deputies to lead attacks on Philippine Air Force headquarters at Villamor Air Base in Pasay and several television stations.

At 1:45 am, Honasan ordered 200 of his men and several V-150 armored vehicles to advance down Jose Laurel Street towards the palace. Despite reaching Malacañang's gates, his forces were beaten back by the Presidential Security Group led by Colonel Voltaire Gazmin, who were reinforced by the Philippine Marines commanded by Brigadier General Rodolfo Biazon, forcing them to retreat into nearby roads. Fifteen minutes later, Colonel Reynaldo Ochosa led his 62nd Infantry Battalion to assault the nearby Nagtahan Bridge, only to be repulsed by loyalist soldiers. He was followed by the 14th IB under Lieutenant Colonel Melchor Acosta Jr., who retreated after another round of government fire. At this time, the rebels ambushed a car carrying Aquino's son Noynoy as he was returning to the palace, wounding him and killing three of his companions. He sustained injuries from five bullets, one of which remained lodged in his neck for the rest of his life. Two palace sentries were also reported to have been shot.

Realizing that his assault had failed, Honasan ordered his men to regroup at Camp Aguinaldo. Near Nagtahan Bridge, they were met by unarmed civilians supporting the president who jeered at them. The rebels opened fire on the crowd with automatic weapons, killing 11 people, including 10 minors, and injuring 54.

Aquino, who resided at the nearby Arlegui Guest House, was woken up at 1:30 am by the gunfire and was asked by one of her daughters what was happening. After her duty officer went out to inspect the situation, she made futile calls to Ramos, who was on this way to Camp Aguinaldo at that time, and her Executive Secretary, Joker Arroyo, before deciding to wait the fighting out by praying the rosary with her daughter. At 4:45 a.m. she went on the air to announce that the attack on Malacañang had been repulsed and that she was safe and well. She urged people to stay indoors until the rebellion was quelled and suspended classes in Metro Manila as well as her scheduled trip to Central Luzon that day. Listeners recalled her voice being reassuring, unhurried and unemotional.

=== Camp Aguinaldo ===
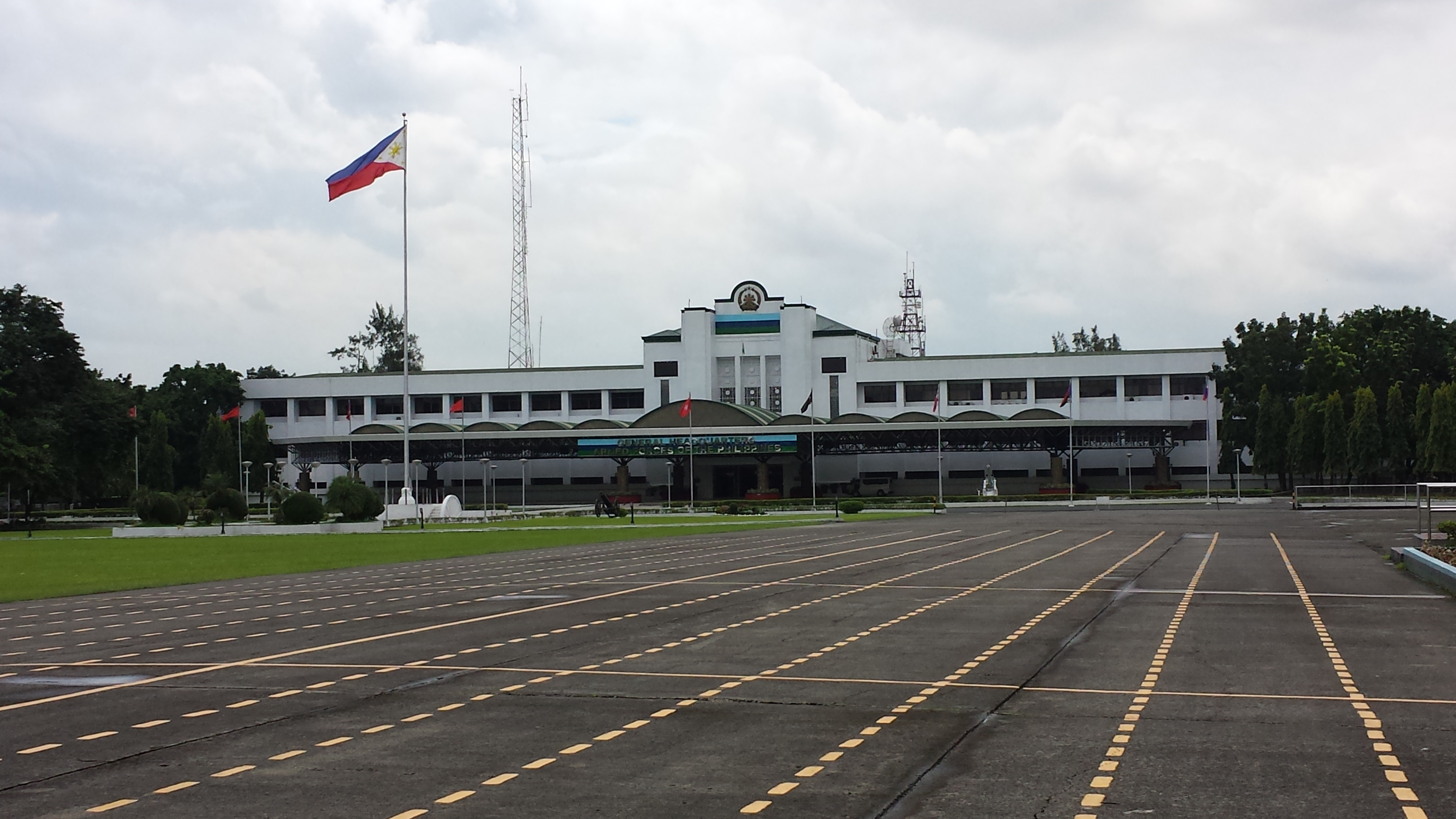
General Headquarters Building of the AFP at Camp General Emilio Aguinaldo, Quezon City

An advance rebel party tried to enter Gate 1 of Camp Aguinaldo but were initially held off by a squad led by Colonel Emiliano Templo and backed by armored vehicles. They were later able to gain entry and were followed by Honasan and his forces from Malacañang. Honasan himself led his men in seizing parts of the camp, including the headquarters of the Department of National Defense.

Despite the rebel presence just 100 m (330 ft) away, the building housing the AFP General Headquarters was still held by loyal soldiers led by Montaño, AFP Vice Chief of Staff Lieutenant General Eduardo Ermita, and deputy chief of staff for civil military operations Brigadier General Orlando Antonio. Finding that the rebels had failed to cut off phone lines, Ramos, who had set up camp at the adjacent headquarters of the Philippine Constabulary in Camp Crame ordered the officers to defend the four-story GHQ building despite being surrounded by the rebels. During the subsequent fighting, the right wing of the building caught fire after the rebels entered the premises and poured gasoline, forcing the trapped officers to "crawl towards the left side of the building" to avoid the flames and snipers.

Around noon, Ramos ordered Marine reinforcements to open fire at rebel positions with artillery and assault the camp, leading to heavy fighting within and around the camp that lasted until 4 pm. They were later joined by vintage T-28 aircraft from Sangley Point Air Station in Cavite who strafed rebel positions in the camp and bombed the west wing of the GHQ building, further contributing to the existing fire.

=== Villamor Air Base ===
At 2:30 am, Philippine Air Force vice commander Brigadier General Federico Pasion, a secret rebel sympathizer, ordered his men to occupy the PAF headquarters building at Villamor Air Base. They succeeded in taking control of the first and second floors, while his superior, Major General Antonio Sotelo, an Aquino loyalist, held his ground at his office on the third floor despite pleas by his son, who had been captured by the rebels. The rebels also seized some of the gates, the motor pool and helicopter storage areas, and were later reinforced by a column sent by Honasan.

At daybreak, Aquino loyalist and Commander of the 205th Tactical Helicopter Wing Brigadier General Loven Abadia managed to enter the base and led government soldiers in a firefight with the rebels during which they were able to retake some helicopters and fly them to Fort Bonifacio along with Sotelo, who escaped through a fire exit and stumbled upon a heavily armed Pasion, whom he managed to disarm. In the late afternoon, the rebels withdrew from the base while rebel reinforcements from Bicol turned back upon hearing news of the coup's failure.

=== Media outlets ===
The rebels seized four television stations in Quezon City, namely ABS-CBN, PTV-4, RPN-9 and IBC-13, and used the channels to broadcast propaganda. Heavy fighting later led to the closure of those stations, leaving only one pro-government channel on-air to broadcast demands for the rebels to surrender.

Brigadier General Alfredo Lim, commander of the Metropolitan Police Force's Western Police District was ordered to retake the ABS-CBN compound which housed both the station and PTV-4 and where loyalist holdouts were besieged by the rebels, as well as Broadcast City, which housed both IBC and RPN. Arriving in the area around noon, Lim and his men encountered some of the first rebel surrenderees who said they were tired of waiting for more than 12 hours for orders. Lim then launched an assault on rebel positions in the compound and on the adjacent Camelot Hotel, supported by the T-28 fighters from Camp Aguinaldo, which left one policeman killed and two wounded. The assault lasted until 2 pm when the rebels surrendered.

=== Provinces ===
Back in Fort Magsaysay, a unit led by Major Horacio Lactao broke out of the camp in the morning of August 28 to join RAM forces in Manila. However, upon realizing that the coup had failed, Lactao decided to turn back, arriving in camp the following day.

In Pampanga, rebels led by PC officers Colonel Reynaldo Berroya and Major Manuel Divina seized Camp Olivas in San Fernando, which Aquino was supposed to visit on August 28, and captured the PC regional commander for Central Luzon Brigadier General Eduardo Taduran, along with his six senior staff officers. Other rebel units managed to capture Basa Air Base, home of the PAF’s fighter planes, in Floridablanca. Shortly before midnight the rebels withdrew from their positions.

In Albay, 80 rebel soldiers led by PC officers Ludovico Dioneda, Diosdado Balleros and Reynaldo Rafal seized Legazpi Airport. Four truckloads of soldiers went to Manila to support the rebels, only to turn back upon learning the coup had failed. After waiting in vain for a promised transport plane to ferry them to Manila, the rebels who remained at the airport returned to their barracks. Another rebel unit from Camarines Sur was diverted to Camp Capinpin in Tanay, Rizal on their way to Manila and were placed under arrest by government forces.

In Cebu City, troops commanded by Central Visayas regional commander Brigadier General Edgardo Abenina placed mayor Jose Cuenco and Cebu provincial governor Osmundo Rama under effective house arrest and ordered radio stations off the air. Dissident units also sprung up in several towns across Cebu, as well as in Siquijor, Bohol, and Negros Oriental. However, the rebels failed to capture the PAF hub at Mactan Airbase. After news of the coup's failure and Abenina's dismissal by Ramos reached the city, the rebel forces withdrew at 11 pm, while Abenina was relieved of his command and placed under arrest on August 29.

In Cagayan, forces led by PC colonel Rodolfo Aguinaldo seized control of the Cagayan Valley regional military headquarters in Tuguegarao, with Aguinaldo later threatening to lead a force of 1,000 troops to Manila to support the coup. As a result, additional barricades were placed around Manila, but Aguinaldo later retreated from the garrison and backed down from his threat.

In Baguio, all 863 cadets of the Philippine Military Academy mounted a silent demonstration of support for the coup before donning combat gear and reiterating their support over the radio. After a briefing by two senior RAM members, the group set out at midnight on August 29 to launch a takeover of the city, only to abort the plan after being informed by sentries of the coup's failure. The incident prompted Vice President Salvador Laurel and other government officials to launch a dialogue with them, while the academy administration suspended classes for two days and confined the entire student body inside the campus for 90 days.

=== End of the coup ===
At 3 pm, President Aquino went on GMA-7, announcing an all-out attack on the mutineers, whom she called traitors and monsters, and that there would be no negotiation.

By the evening of August 28, government troops were able to recapture most of the rebel-held facilities while other rebel units retreated or surrendered, and the coup fizzled out by August 29 with the surrender of the last 50 mutineers at Camp Olivas. Honasan himself escaped from Camp Aguinaldo aboard a helicopter.

== Casualties and damage ==
A total of 53 people were killed during the coup and 358 others were wounded. Many of the fatalities were unarmed civilians who were fired upon by rebels after they were jeered by the crowd. Among the dead was Robert Macdonald, a free-lance photographer from New Zealand working for Pacific Defense Reports who was shot in the head by government forces who mistook his camera flash for a weapon during fighting around PTV-4, and Martin Castor, a photographer for the national newspaper Pilipino Ngayon. Property damages reached P450 million ($22.5 million).

RAM's killing of civilians in Nagtahan Bridge severely damaged its image and cost it popular support. While in hiding, Honasan initially denied the group's responsibility for the deaths, saying that it occurred during a crossfire with government forces before taking responsibility for those and other deaths in his other coup attempts during his senatorial campaign in 1995.

== Aftermath ==
Following the coup, Aquino was perceived to have harbored a grudge against Honasan over the attack on her only son. During a speech commemorating National Heroes Day on August 30, President Aquino mocked Honasan for calling his followers as “idealist young officers fighting for justice, equality and freedom”, saying that their actions conveyed their "hatred of democracy" and that "one cannot be idealistic and a liar.” Some 1,500 civilian supporters of the President subsequently staged a demonstration in Manila condemning the coup on September 12.

=== Prosecution of coup participants ===
General Ramos issued a shoot-to-kill order on Honasan, who was captured by the military in a house in Valle Verde, Pasig on December 9, 1987, but escaped from a prison ship in 1988. He later organized another coup attempt against Aquino in 1989, which exceeded his earlier attempt in terms of damage and casualties.

At least 507 military personnel were charged in connection with the coup, while 595 others were cleared of involvement. On October 3, 1988, lieutenant colonel Francisco Baula, who helped lead the assault on Villamor Air Base, was arrested at a restaurant in Manila, but was shot and killed while trying to escape from Camp Crame 12 days later.

Colonel Aguinaldo was stripped of his command for his seizure of the Tuguegarao garrison and placed under investigation but resigned before any proceedings could be taken against him. He was elected Governor of Cagayan in 1988, joined the 1989 coup and staged his own rebellion against Aquino in 1990.

In 1989, the first convictions relating to the coup attempt were issued, with a court martial sentencing nine officers, including Berroya, who had surrendered in November 1987, to eight years imprisonment with hard labor for their role in the seizure of Camp Olivas. In 1991, former navy seaman Jose Pedragoza was arrested by the Criminal Investigation Service for his involvement in the takeover of PTV-4. In 1992, rebellion charges against PC Colonel Reynaldo Cabauatan were dismissed by the Quezon City Regional Trial Court due to the prosecution's failure to locate their witnesses for the trial.

In 1993, Honasan, who remained in hiding, and other RAM members availed of an amnesty offered by Ramos, by then Aquino's successor as president, to participants in the coup attempts of the 1980s, which enabled him to run and win a seat in the Philippine Senate during elections held in 1995.

=== Military analysis ===
The August coup was the sixth attempt by military dissidents to remove President Aquino from office. Its surprise implementation also marked a break from previous plots that were discovered weeks in advance and even advertised in newspapers. Furthermore, the coup marked the first significant loss of life caused by fighting within the military, which had been mostly avoided in prior confrontations.

From a military perspective, Alfred McCoy, in his study on Philippine military adventurism, criticizes Honasan for patching up his forces from some 25 units rather than a regular one, his overreliance on infantry and lack of armored support, and fragmenting his forces to attack secondary targets rather than focusing on the seizure of Malacañang. The failure of the coup also exposed RAM's narrowing political base and forced it to link up with other dissident factions within the military, such as the pro-Marcos Soldiers of the Filipino People, and the Young Officers Union composed of junior officers who broke away from Honasan's leadership. These groups eventually coalesced to launch the 1989 coup.

=== Political reactions ===
Following the coup attempt, all 26 members of the Aquino cabinet resigned on September 9, and her government veered to the right, dismissing perceived left-leaning officials such as Joker Arroyo and tacitly authorizing the establishment of armed, quasi-military groups to combat the ongoing communist insurgency. It was also believed that Fidel Ramos, who remained loyal to Aquino, emerged as the second most powerful person in government following his successful quelling of the coup. Across-the-board wage increases for soldiers were also granted.

From his exile in Hawaii, Ferdinand Marcos denied involvement in the coup, but said that he was ready to return to power if the rebels overthrew Aquino and invited him back. Juan Ponce Enrile, by then the only oppositionist member of the Senate, also denied involvement in the coup.

Several politicians voiced sympathy for the rebel soldiers' grievances, even while deploring their methods. Aquino's Vice President and concurrent Foreign Secretary, Salvador Laurel, said that the "government and the rebels should try to communicate" and called on the government to "look into the rebel complaints." Senator Joey Lina said that he would "look into the grievances" of the rebels, while Senate majority floor leader Orly Mercado said the revolt was inevitable, given the continuing strains in the military that were never clearly resolved. Both Mercado and Ramos compared the coup to lancing a boil, saying that it was important that such tensions were finally "excised" and "drained".

=== Aquino's libel suit ===
In October 1987, President Aquino personally sued Philippine Star columnist Louie Beltran and publisher Maximo Soliven for libel after Beltran wrote that she hid under her bed during the attack on Malacañang. She then took television reporters on a tour of her bedroom, showing them that there was no space for her to hide under because it sat on a platform.

Aquino subsequently testified twice in the case, becoming the first Philippine president to appear in court to challenge the media. Despite Beltran's defense that he had only used the phrase as a figure of speech and Soliven being away at the time of the article's publication, both men were convicted days before Aquino left office in 1992 by Judge Ramon Makasiar, who ordered them to be imprisoned for up to two years and to jointly pay $76,000 in damages to Aquino. The ruling was reversed by the Court of Appeals in 1995, by which time Beltran had died back in 1994.

== See also ==
- Coup attempts against Corazon Aquino

== Bibliography ==
- The Davide Fact-Finding Commission (1990). The Final Report of the Fact-Finding Commission (pursuant to R.A. No. 6832). Makati: Bookmark Inc. p. 118. ISBN 971-569-003-3.
