= Hotel Delfino siege =

1990 siege in Tugegarao, Philippines

Siege at Hotel Delfino
Date	March 4, 1990
Location	Tuguegarao, Cagayan, Philippines 17.616667°N 121.716667°E
Result	Suspended Cagayan Governor Rodolfo Aguinaldo and his forces escape into the mountains

Government-Insurgents
Philippine government	Reform the Armed Forces Movement

Commanders and leaders
(Philippines) Corazon Aquino (Philippines) Luis Santos (Secretary of the Interior and Local Government) (Philippines) Brig Gen Oscar Florendo †	Rodolfo Aguinaldo

Units involved
Armed Forces of the Philippines	Aguinaldo loyalists

Strength
About 1,000 soldiers	200 – 300 followers

Casualties and losses
- 14 killed (including civilians); 20 wounded

The siege at Hotel Delfino (Filipino: Pagkubkob sa Hotel Delfino, Ilocano: Sitio ti Hotel Delfino) in Tuguegarao, Cagayan in the Philippines, took place on March 4, 1990. A private army estimated at 300 men seized the hotel under the command of suspended Cagayan governor Rodolfo "Agi" Aguinaldo, a fierce critic of the administration of President Corazon Aquino and the Communist rebellion in the Philippines. The incident was an offshoot of the 1989 Philippine coup attempt that Aguinaldo publicly supported, which prompted his suspension and arrest. The standoff ended violently after several hours, leaving 14 people dead, including a general who tried to arrest him.

== Background ==
=== Aguinaldo ===
Rodolfo E. Aguinaldo

Governor of Cagayan
- In office June 30, 1992 – June 30, 1998
- Preceded by: David Puzon Jr.
- Succeeded by: Florencio Vargas
- In office February 2, 1988 – March 4, 1990
- Vice Governor: Melvin Vargas
- Preceded by: Domingo de Leon
- Succeeded by: Melvin Vargas

Member of the Philippine House of Representatives from Cagayan's 3rd district
- In office June 30, 1998 – June 12, 2001
- Preceded by: Manuel Mamba
- Succeeded by: Manuel Mamba

Personal details
- Born: Rodolfo Espejo Aguinaldo; September 12, 1946 Pasuquin, Ilocos Norte, Philippines
- Died: June 12, 2001 (aged 54) Tuguegarao, Cagayan, Philippines
- Education: Philippine Military Academy

Military service
- Branch/service: Philippine Constabulary
- Years of service: 1968-1987
- Rank: Lieutenant colonel

Rodolfo Espejo Aguinaldo was born in Pasuquin, Ilocos Norte on September 12, 1946, to Felix Aguinaldo and Lorenza Espejo. He graduated from the Philippine Military Academy in 1972 and served in the Philippine Constabulary (PC). During this period, he was accused of torturing dissidents during the Martial Law period in the 1970s and 1980s. Among those who positively identified him were Etta Rosales, who later became one of his colleagues in the 11th Congress of the Philippines and Chair of the Commission on Human Rights, and Satur Ocampo, future representative of Bayan Muna Partylist. As one of the leading officers involved in the counterinsurgency efforts against the Communist rebellion in the Philippines, he led an operation that led to the capture of Jose Maria Sison, leader of the Communist Party of the Philippines in San Fernando, La Union in 1977. In 1981, Aguinaldo was assigned to Cagayan as assistant provincial PC commander, marking the start of his association with the province. His willingness to accompany his men in the field during counterinsurgency patrols led him to be called the "Rambo of the Philippines" by military officers.

=== Anti-government activity ===
In the early 1980s, Aguinaldo joined the Reform the Armed Forces Movement (RAM), a dissident faction within the Armed Forces of the Philippines (AFP) that was founded by alumni of the Philippine Military Academy such as Colonel Gringo Honasan, Eduardo Kapunan and Victor Batac, citing disillusionment with the regime of President Ferdinand Marcos for its handling of the communist rebellion. Aguinaldo was deemed responsible for disclosing the names of 14 key RAM officers to a CIA contact at the U.S. Embassy, which was believed to have contributed to the Marcos' discovery of RAM's plot to overthrow the government, which forced the coup plotters to launch their revolt earlier than scheduled. When the 1986 EDSA People Power Revolution broke out, Aguinaldo led RAM forces in seizing control of government media outlets in Quezon City, paving the way for the overthrow of Marcos and the assumption of power by his rival, Corazon Aquino. As a reward, he was promoted to become provincial PC commander of Cagayan.

Following the revolution, Aguinaldo and other RAM members became disillusioned by the Aquino government's opening of negotiations with the communists and the release of Sison and other party members and dissidents. As a result, Aguinaldo joined attempts by the RAM to overthrow President Aquino, starting with the Manila Hotel siege in July 1986 where he served as a RAM liaison with Marcos loyalists who staged the failed coup. Aguinaldo actively participated in RAM's failed coup attempt on August 28, 1987, and led his forces in briefly seizing control of the Cagayan Valley regional military headquarters in Tuguegarao, stating later that he would launch more coup attempts.

=== Governor of Cagayan ===
Following the 1987 coup, Aguinaldo was stripped of his command and placed under investigation but resigned with the rank of lieutenant colonel before any significant action could be taken against him. He then ran for Governor of Cagayan in the 1988 local elections, successfully winning on a populist platform against established rivals who were ironically supported by RAM's political patron Juan Ponce Enrile, by a landslide. Ironically, one of those who were said to have provided financial support to Aguinaldo's campaign was Florendo, who was killed in his rebellion. During this time, he was regarded as a provincial warlord who built an independent economic base using revenues from logging, smuggling and gambling as well as defense funds and weapons caches to establish a private army of 1,200 Aeta tribesmen and former New People's Army guerrillas.

=== 1989 Coup Attempt ===
On December 1, 1989, RAM launched its third attempt to overthrow the Aquino government. Governor Aguinaldo went on the air over DZRH in the morning, declaring support for the coup. Five hundred of his men attempted to reach Manila but were blocked in Nueva Ecija. After the coup failed, Aguinaldo was suspended as governor in January 1990 based on his radio announcement. A week before his attack on the hotel Aguinaldo was indicted on charges of rebellion and murder relating to the failed coup.

== Events ==
=== Advance on Tuguegarao ===
Disputing both his suspension as governor and the rebellion charges, Aguinaldo refused to surrender to authorities. Along with hundreds of armed followers, he went into hiding in the village of Dakel in his adopted hometown of Gattaran while civilian supporters tried to prevent his arrest by forming human barricades at the provincial capitol. On learning government troops were planning to attack his hideout, Aguinaldo proceeded with his troops in a convoy toward Tuguegarao in the early hours of March 4. The convoy was composed of at least 100 civilians and about 300 armed Aetas, disgruntled Scout Rangers, and paramilitary units and included truckloads of ammunition and an armored personnel carrier.

=== Capture of Hotel Delfino ===
Brigadier General Oscar Florendo, Armed Forces of the Philippines chief of Civil Military Relations, and Interior Secretary Luis Santos were dispatched to Tuguegarao by President Aquino to serve Aguinaldo with an arrest warrant, but were caught off-guard by the speedy arrival of Aguinaldo's forces, which were estimated to be between 200 and 300. Santos, along with the Archbishop of Tuguegarao, Diosdado Talamayan, had previously been involved with unsuccessful negotiations for Aguinaldo's surrender in January 1990.

After Aguinaldo's men, led by defecting Scout Ranger captain Feliciano Sabite, seized control of Hotel Delfino where the general was staying and cut off water and electricity supplies, Florendo and two of his aides were taken hostage along with more than 50 other hotel guests while Santos, two army colonels and a navy commodore barricaded themselves on the second floor before being rescued along with two mayors. Thirty others were held hostage by Aguinaldo's forces in a pawn shop. About 2,000 of Aguinaldo's civilian supporters arrived in front of the hotel chanting his name, while Aguinaldo’s forces set up checkpoints near the hotel and slashed the tires of nearby vehicles. Soldiers blocked a bridge south of Tuguegarao which connected the town with Manila.

=== Clashes ===
Aguinaldo was initially receptive, holding a press conference with Florendo in the hotel lobby despite claiming to have been wounded in an ambush by government forces outside Tuguegarao that killed one person. He gave an interview in which he claimed to be a "victim of injustice" and said he would not mind dying "as a villain". However, gunfire erupted a few hours later at the nearby Balzain Bridge, sparking heavy fighting across the town that culminated with government troops dispersing civilian demonstrators outside the hotel with teargas before storming the building at 03:00 pm. Florendo was then killed in the ensuing crossfire, while Aguinaldo fled to the mountains with a militia three hundred strong, reportedly on an ambulance. More than 200 of Aguinaldo's followers surrendered to government authorities, while most hostages were released by the following day.

The fighting left 14 people dead and wounded twenty. Aside from Florendo, ten people were killed at the Balzain Bridge, while three others were killed in clashes near a gas station.

== Aftermath ==
Florendo's body was returned to Manila after the incident and was buried with full military honors at the Libingan ng mga Bayani on March 10, 1990. President Aquino condemned his killing as an "act of treachery and cowardice." General Renato de Villa, Chief of Staff of the Armed Forces of the Philippines, ordered Aguinaldo to be taken "dead or alive."

Aguinaldo spent the next three months in hiding until he finally surrendered at the Cagayan provincial capitol but was later released on bail. While on the run, he took responsibility for Florendo's death, calling it a ″terrible mistake″, although the actual killer of Florendo was never definitively identified.

On March 19, 1990, Secretary of Local Government Luis T. Santos dismissed Aguinaldo from office for the administrative offense of disloyalty arising from the 1989 coup attempt. Despite this, Aguinaldo won reelection by a landslide in the 1992 elections. On May 9, 1992, the Commission on Elections granted petitions to disqualify Aguinaldo on the basis of his removal from office in 1990. However, Aguinaldo's continued eligibility to hold office was sustained by the Supreme Court, which adopted a legal doctrine, later named after him, that a public official cannot be held liable for administrative misconduct committed during a prior term since his re-election to office operates as a condonation of his past misconduct. The ruling was subsequently applied to similar cases involving elected officials until it was reversed by the Supreme Court in 2016.

In 1993, Aguinaldo availed of an amnesty offered by the government of President Fidel Ramos to RAM members and other coup participants and stayed on as Governor until 1998, when he was elected as representative of Cagayan's 3rd congressional district, serving until his assassination on June 12, 2001, by NPA hitmen in Tuguegarao, shortly after losing his reelection bid during the previous month to Manuel Mamba, who would also become the governor of Cagayan from 2016 to 2025.

The Hotel Delfino remains a functioning hotel run by the Ting family, members of which have served as mayors of Tuguegarao for several decades, including at the time of the siege.

== In popular culture ==
The incident is featured, albeit with some inaccuracies, in the climax of Aguinaldo's 1993 biopic Aguinaldo: The True-to-Life Story of Gov. Rodolfo Aguinaldo of Cagayan, starring Lito Lapid as Aguinaldo and Ramil Rodriguez as Florendo. Aguinaldo himself appears at the beginning of the film to make an opening statement and is shown taking the oath of office at the ending of the film. Some scenes were shot in Tuguegarao itself, including at the Hotel Delfino and Balzain Bridge.

== See also ==
- Coup attempts against Corazon Aquino
