= February 1986 Reform the Armed Forces Movement coup =

Philippine event starting the People Power Revolution

1986 Reform the Armed Forces Movement coup
- Part of the People Power Revolution
Date	February 22, 1986
Location	Metro Manila, Philippines
Result	Plot discovered: RAM soldiers arrested; Enrile takes shelter at Camp Aguinaldo; Start of the People Power Revolution

Belligerents
Reform the Armed Forces Movement	Government of the Philippines; Armed Forces of the Philippines; Presidential Security Group; Integrated National Police

Commanders and leaders
Gregorio Honasan; Juan Ponce Enrile	Ferdinand Marcos; Fabian Ver

The February 1986 Reform the Armed Forces Movement coup was a failed coup d’état in the Philippines set in motion by the Reform the Armed Forces Movement (RAM) under the leadership of Defense Minister Juan Ponce Enrile. The coup was meant to depose then-President Ferdinand Marcos, but was discovered and aborted in its earliest stages on February 22, 1986. The plot was to take advantage of the public disruption arising from revelations of cheating during the 1986 Philippine presidential election, and replace Marcos with a military junta which would include Enrile, Philippine Constabulary Chief Fidel V. Ramos, then-Presidential Candidate Corazon Aquino, and Roman Catholic Archbishop of Manila Cardinal Jaime Sin, among others, which Enrile and the RAM Colonels would control from behind the scenes.

The plot is notable for being the first major military action set in motion by the Reform the Armed Forces Movement, and for advancing the timeline of the People Power Revolution, which would otherwise have taken the form of a civil disobedience campaign led by Aquino, who had refused to back down after the revealed cheating in the 1986 Philippine presidential election.

After learning that their plot had been uncovered, Enrile and the RAM decided to abort it, and instead stage a last stand in Camp Aguinaldo. He then called Philippine Constabulary Chief General Fidel Ramos and Cardinal Sin to request support. The defection of Ramos, who commanded nearby Camp Crame; the arrival of civilians to form a human barricade surrounding the two camps; and the eventual defection of numerous other units of the AFP, eventually snowballed into what became the People Power Revolution.

Corazon Aquino, who had rejected Enrile's proposed military junta, was eventually inaugurated as the civilian president of a revolutionary government that was not military in nature. Enrile was briefly granted the role of Defense Secretary in Aquino's administration, but then made to resign following "disagreements" and his alleged role in plotting later coups against her. RAM would later stage several failed coup attempts against Aquino from November 1986 to October 1990.

== Background ==
Even before he first became President of the Philippines in 1965, Ferdinand Marcos sought close ties to any officers of the Armed Forces of the Philippines loyal to him. Once in power, he developed "a patronage system within the defense establishment" which he leaned upon when he declared martial law shortly before the end of his last constitutionally allowed presidential term in 1972. During the ensuing 14 years of his dictatorship, Marcos used the AFP as what the Davide Commission Report would later call his "martial law implementor," and "one of the vital supports of the regime." To ensure their cooperation, Marcos "had to expand the military organization and patronize the generals to buy their loyalty."

Generals loyal to Marcos were allowed to stay in their positions past their supposed retirement age, or were rewarded with civilian government posts. This led to a loss of morale among the middle-ranks of the AFP, because it meant a significant slowdown in promotions and caused many officers to retire with ranks much lower than they would otherwise have earned.

Several cabals of dissatisfied officers eventually formed among the middle-ranks of the AFP, most notably the Reform the Armed Forces Movement (RAM) in the early 1980s. Three members of the Philippine Military Academy Matatag Class of 1971, Gregorio Honasan, Victor Batac, and Eduardo Kapunan, were the key founders of RAM, and most of its members came from the Class of 1971. But there were also members from other classes who were part of the founders of RAM which include Former Navy Capt. Proceso Maligalig from Class of 1969 and Ret. Brigadier General Danilo Lim from Class of 1978. Maligalig continued to become the Spokesperson and eventually, the President Emeritus of the organization. The first officers to join RAM were mostly members of the PMA classes 1971 through 1984, i.e. soldiers who had spent their careers during the Martial Law era and the "Bagong Lipunan" era which followed it, all under the command of Marcos as Commander-in-Chief.

After its formation in 1982, the members of RAM began making plans for a coup attempt against Marcos, nearly organizing one in 1985 but deciding to delay it when Marcos called for a snap election.

The election took place in early February 1986, but significant irregularities were reported during the counting. Corazon Aquino rejected the results and held the "Tagumpay ng Bayan" (People's Victory) rally at Luneta Park on February 16, 1986, announcing a civil disobedience campaign and calling for her supporters to boycott publications and companies which were associated with Marcos or any of his cronies. The event was attended by a crowd of about two million people. Aquino's camp began making preparations for more rallies, and Aquino herself went to Cebu to rally more people to their cause.

At this point, Enrile and the RAM officers decided to make their move, taking advantage of the social unrest brought about by the revelations.

== Objectives and leaders ==
The goal of the RAM coup d'état, planned by Colonels Gregorio Honasan and Red Kapunan, was to overthrow Marcos and turn power over to a military junta which would include Enrile.

Of the personalities expected to be part of this junta, only Enrile was aware of the plan. The other four people planned members (Ambassador and retired Lieutenant General Rafael Ileto; former Marcos Executive Secretary Rafael Salas; opposition leader Cory Aquino; and Cardinal Sin) did not know about the plot nor of their place in the junta. Some accounts say Fidel Ramos and opposition businessman Jaime Ongpin were also supposed to be part of the junta, while others note that various government officials who were "friendly" to the opposition were also included.

Historian Alfred McCoy notes that in any case, the junta was merely a façade for Enrile and his trusted officers, who would be the real power behind the scenes.

== Plan of attack ==
In the months and years after its founding in 1982, RAM's officers prepared numerous scenarios for how to implement the coup. The plan eventually selected was for a commando team to assault Malacañang Palace at dawn on February 23, arrest Ferdinand and Imelda Marcos, and “convince” them to step down.

RAM founder Col. Gringo Honasan formulated the plan, in which several companies from the Scout Rangers and the Army would assault Malacañang palace simultaneously from four points:

- Five commando teams would enter Malacañang from the Pasig river;
- two companies from the 16th Infantry Battalion (16 IB), accompanied by an armor company, would launch a diversionary attack from Malacañang Park, commanded by Lt Colonel Marcelino Malajacan commanding officer Lt Col Marcelino Malajacan;
- a Ranger Force from the 49th Infantry Battalion (49 IB) under the command of Major Saulito Aromin would then drive a convoy of 6 x 6 trucks and a platoon of armor through the palace's gate at J.P. Laurel Street, pretending to be reinforcements from Fort Bonifacio; and lastly,
- a unit commanded by Lt Colonel Eduardo Kapunan would establish a position behind the Palace gym in order to provide cover for the commandos coming in from the Pasig.

Select insiders within the palace were recruited for a number of tasks which would allow the assaulting forces to enter the palace and the Marcoses' private quarters. This included Imelda's chief security escort officer Captain Ricardo Morales, and the palace's perimeter security officer, Major Edgardo Doromal.

Other military units would take over key strategic facilities, such as the airport, military bases, the GHQAFP in Camp Aguinaldo, and major highway junctions to restrict counteroffensive by Marcos-loyal troops.

== Discovery ==
=== Security leaks ===
Honasan's ambitious plan was undermined by RAM's inability to keep their plans secret. One of the palace insiders Honasan had tried to recruit was Malacañang's perimeter security officer, Major Edgardo Doromal. But Doromal reportedly had misgivings about joining the plot, and reported the coup to Presidential Security Command (PSC) Chief of Staff Irwin Ver, who then informed his father, General Fabian Ver.

It was later revealed that the Marcos regime may also have learned about the RAM plot from the CIA, because RAM member Lt Col Rodolfo Aguinaldo had revealed the names of 14 key RAM officers to his CIA contact at the United States embassy in Manila, without permission from RAM.

But aside from these leaks, RAM's plans were telegraphed to Marcos forces through insecure communications and through large observable troop movements. RAM had been under the scrutiny of the rest of the military establishment ever since they made their existence public at the March 1985 Philippine Military Academy reunion, and Alred McCoy notes that RAM's planning sessions in January 1986, conducted by Honasan and Kapunan, were very insecure, with "as many as 15 military officers in attendance at a time."

=== Infiltration by the Presidential Security Command ===
Marcos' Presidential Security Command (PSC) had already suspected that RAM was ready to stage a coup as early as December 1985, shortly after Marcos called for the snap elections. As a result, the PSC assigned two operatives to infiltrate the RAM and learn about their plans.

=== First arrests and reinforcement of Malacañang security ===
==== Friday, February 21 ====
On the morning of February 21, Colonel Morales reported to Malacañang and requested to be issued a firearm. Since the Presidential Security Command was already aware of Morales' involvement in RAM, PSC Commander Colonel Irwin Ver had Morales arrested. However, the arrest was not revealed to the public until much later.

Late that evening, 19 individuals who were part the protection detail of Finance Minister Roberto Ongpin were caught outside the house of Philippine Marine Corps Commander General Artemio Tadiar, and arrested on suspicion of being there to assassinate Tadiar.

==== Saturday, February 22 ====
Before dawn on February 22, Honasan and Kapunan did one last reconnoitring of the approaches to Malacañang Palace, a day before the coup was supposed to be launched. They observed the movements of forces around the palace, which suggested that they had been betrayed and their plot uncovered.

At 9:00 am, Honasan had a conversation with Metropolitan Command officer Col. Rolando Abadilla, whom General Ver had sent with a message to Honasan telling him "not to do anything rash." By the time Abadilla left an hour later, Honasan received intelligence of further fortifications around Malacañang: the 5th Marine Battalion landing Team had been moved to just outside Malacañang Park, and that the 14th Army Infantry Battalion had been moved from Nueva Ecija to North Harbor. Honasan and Kapunan tried to inform Enrile about these developments by phone, but were unable to, and rushed off to find him in person.

At around 10:00 am on February 22, Enrile learned about the arrest of Ongpin's men, which told him that the coup plot had been compromised, because some of the men on Ongpin's protection detail were from Enrile's own security forces, and several of them knew all about the coup plans.

=== Recognition of failure ===
By around noon that day, Honasan and Kapunan finally found Enrile having lunch at his house in Dasmariñas Village in Makati. The RAM coup plot had been foiled, and the question now was what to do next.

Honasan and Kapunan argued for dispersing their forces and eventually trying to hold out in Enrile's home province of Cagayan in northern Luzon. Eventually, Enrile decided he instead preferred to have a last stand at Camp Aguinaldo.

== Last stand and the beginning of the People Power Revolution ==
Once the decision to make a last stand in Camp Aguinaldo was made at lunchtime on Saturday, February 22, Enrile immediately contacted Philippine Constabulary chief General Fidel Ramos, asking for support. Ramos, who was talking to a group of Aquino supporters at his residence at the time, immediately agreed, but did not tell his guests about his decision.

Enrile quickly left his house in Dasmariñas Village, Makati, with Honasan and Kapunan in tow, moving to his offices in Camp Aguinaldo. Ramos also left his house and elected to position himself in Camp Crame, where he could take advantage of the resources of his office such as phones and other lines of communication. Enrile took on the task of trying to win the support of the international community and the press, while Ramos would take charge of the military operations.

Enrile's wife Cristina was asked to contact publisher Eugenia Apostol, who could then reach out to Roman Catholic Archbishop Jaime Sin and ask for the church's support. Ramos reached out to Major Gen. Prospero Olivas of the Philippine Constabulary Metropolitan Command (MetroCom) and Philippine Navy Commodore Tagumpay Jardiniano, receiving their support. Ramos also placed a second call to Cardinal Sin, asking for his support.

Despite Ramos' defection the coup plotters were essentially trapped in Camps Aguinaldo and Crame, and in the words of historian Vicente L. Rafael, "became sitting ducks for Ferdinand Marcos' loyalist forces."

At 6:45 PM on Saturday, February 22, Enrile and Ramos staged a press conference in Camp Aguinaldo that they were withdrawing their support from President Marcos, and were asking him to step down. Soon after, Cardinal Sin went on Radio Veritas asking people nearby to go to the vicinity of the camps and form a crowd that would discourage Marcos from wiping out Enrile and Ramos' forces.

Later that evening, Marcos went on air and revealed that Captain Morales had been caught and arrested, and that Enrile's coup plot had been foiled. In another press conference the following morning, Marcos also showed Malajacan, Aromin, and Brillantes, who had also been arrested.

Marcos ordered the arrest of all the leaders of the RAM plot, but even as Marcos staged his press briefing to present Morales on the evening of February 22, civilian supporters of Corazon Aquino were already en route to EDSA in between Camps Aguinaldo and Camp Crame to help protect the coup plotters. The RAM coup plot had been quashed, but the People Power Revolution had begun.

== Legacy ==
The February 1986 RAM coup is notable for being the first major military action set in motion by the Reform the Armed Forces Movement, and for advancing the timeline of the People Power Revolution, which would otherwise have taken the form of a civil disobedience campaign led by Aquino, who had refused to back down after the revealed cheating in the 1986 Philippine presidential election.
