= Presidency of Corazon Aquino =

Philippine presidential administration from 1986 to 1992

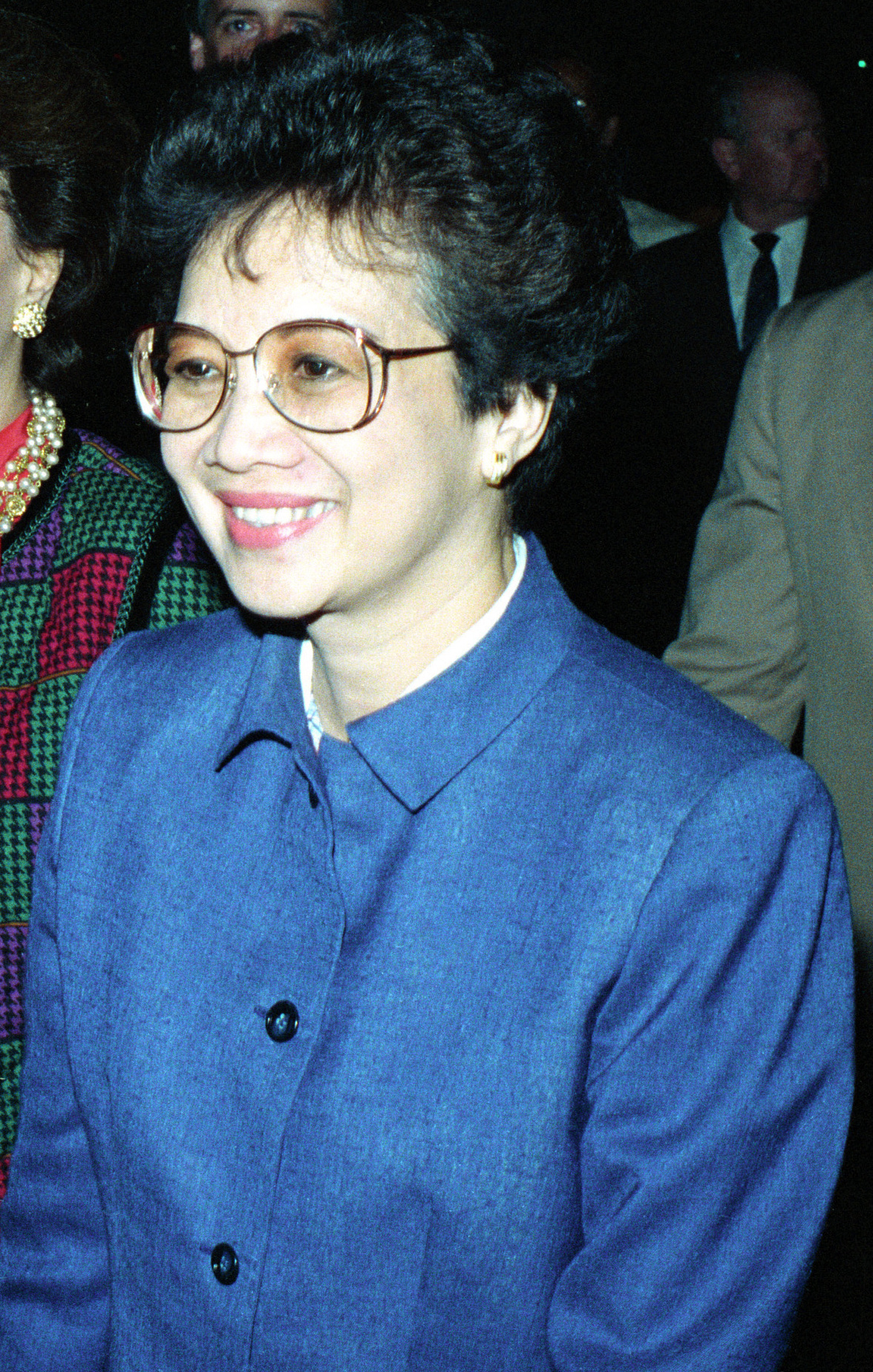
- Aquino in 1986
- Presidency of Corazon Aquino; February 25, 1986 – June 30, 1992
- President: Corazon C. Aquino
- Vice President: Salvador Laurel
- Cabinet: See list
- Party: UNIDO (1986–87); Independent (1987–92)
- Election: 1986
- Seat: Malacañang Palace, Manila
- Seal of the President of the Philippines (1986–1998)

Corazon Aquino began her presidency on February 25, 1986, following the People Power Revolution as the 11th president of the Philippines, succeeding Ferdinand Marcos. Aquino's relatively peaceful ascension to the Philippine presidency signaled the end of authoritarian rule of Ferdinand Marcos in the Philippines, and drew her and the Filipino people international acclaim and admiration.

During the first months of Aquino's presidency, the country experienced radical changes and sweeping democratic reforms. Aquino created the Presidential Commission on Good Government (PCGG), which was tasked to go after the Marcos ill-gotten wealth; however, after her presidency, the PCGG itself was also implicated by corruption scandals when it was alleged that officials wanted a cut of the Marcos assets and officials were "milking" sequestered assets. Aquino, being a revolutionary president by virtue of people power, repealed and abolished repressive laws under her predecessor, restored civil liberties, abolished the 1973 "Marcos Constitution" and dissolved the Marcos allies, loyalists, supporters-dominated Batasang Pambansa, despite the advice of her vice-president and only prime minister Salvador Laurel. She also immediately created a Constitutional Commission, which she directed for the drafting of a new constitution for the nation.

== Administration and cabinet ==
| Office | Name | Term |
|---|---|---|
| President | Corazon Cojuangco Aquino | February 25, 1986 – March 25, 1986 |
| Vice-President | Salvador H. Laurel | February 25, 1986 – March 25, 1986 |
| Prime Minister | Salvador H. Laurel | February 25, 1986 – March 25, 1986 |
| Presidential Executive Assistant | Joker Arroyo | February 25, 1986 – March 25, 1986 |
| Minister of Agrarian Reform | Conrado F. Estrella | February 25, 1986 – March 25, 1986 |
| Minister of Agriculture and Food | Ramon Mitra, Jr. | February 25, 1986 – March 25, 1986 |
| Minister of Budget and Management | Alberto Romulo | February 26, 1986 – March 25, 1986 |
| Minister of Economic Planning | Solita Monsod | February 25, 1986 – March 25, 1986 |
| Minister of Education, Culture and Sports | Lourdes Quisimbing | February 25, 1986 – March 25, 1986 |
| Minister of Finance | Jaime Ongpin | February 25, 1986 – March 25, 1986 |
| Minister of Foreign Affairs | Salvador Laurel | February 25, 1986 – March 25, 1986 |
| Minister of Health | Alfredo Bengzon | February 25, 1986 – March 25, 1986 |
| Minister of Local Government and Community Development | Aquilino Pimentel, Jr. | February 25, 1986 – March 25, 1986 |
| Minister of Justice | Estelito Mendoza | February 25, 1986 – February 28, 1986 |
| Minister of Justice | Neptali Gonzales | March 1, 1986 – March 25, 1986 |
| Minister of Labor and Employment | Augusto Sanchez | February 25, 1986 – March 25, 1986 |
| Minister of National Defense | Juan Ponce Enrile | February 25, 1986 – March 25, 1986 |
| Minister of Natural Resources | Ernesto Maceda | February 25, 1986 – March 25, 1986 |
| Minister of Public Works and Highways | Rogaciano M. Mercado | February 25, 1986 – March 25, 1986 |
| Minister of Tourism | Jose Antonio Gonzales | February 25, 1986 – March 25, 1986 |
| Minister of Trade and Industry | Jose Concepcion Jr. | February 25, 1986 – March 25, 1986 |
| Minister of Transportation and Communications | Hernando Perez | February 25, 1986 – March 25, 1986 |
| Presidential Spokesperson | Rene Saguisag | February 25, 1986 – March 25, 1986 |

== Supreme Court appointments ==
Aquino appointed the following to the Supreme Court of the Philippines:

Chief Justice

1. Claudio Teehankee – (appointed Chief Justice, April 2, 1986)
2. Justice Jose Feria – April 7, 1986
3. Pedro Yap – April 8, 1986 (appointed Chief Justice, April 19, 1988)
4. Marcelo Fernan – April 9, 1986 (appointed Chief Justice, July 1, 1988)
5. Andres Narvasa – April 10, 1986 (his last SC Chief Justice, December 1, 1991)

Associate Justices

1. Justice Isagani Cruz – April 16, 1986
2. Justice Edgardo L. Paras – April 16, 1986
3. Justice Florentino P. Feliciano – August 8, 1986
4. Justice Teodoro R. Padilla – January 12, 1987
5. Justice Abdulwahid Bidin – January 12, 1987
6. Justice Emilio A. Gancayco – January 12, 1987
7. Justice Abraham Sarmiento – January 25, 1987
8. Justice Irene R. Cortes – February 1, 1987
9. Justice Carolina Griño-Aquino – February 2, 1988
10. Justice Leo D. Medialdea – May 2, 1988
11. Justice Florenz Regalado – July 29, 1988
12. Justice Hilario G. Davide, Jr. – January 24, 1991
13. Justice Flerida Ruth Pineda-Romero – October 21, 1991
14. Justice Rodolfo A. Nocon – December 2, 1991
15. Justice Josue N. Bellosillo – March 3, 1992 (her last SC justice appointee)

== Domestic policies ==
Aquino during her Sixth State of the Nation Address on July 22, 1991

=== Economy ===
Aquino inherited an economy that was bankrupt and debt-ridden as a result of twenty years of mismanagement under the Marcos regime. Aquino focused on revitalizing and rejuvenating the sagging economy. She made bold moves to dismantle the various monopolies perpetrated by President Ferdinand Marcos during his stay in power.

Aquino moved quickly to tackle the issue of the US$26 billion foreign debt incurred by her predecessor, deciding to honor all the debts that were incurred previously under different administrations instead of repudiating it; her decision proved to be unpopular but Aquino defended it, saying that it was the most practical move and choice to make as it was crucial for the country at that time to regain the confidence of investors and the international community in the Philippine economy. Since 1986, the Aquino administration has paid off $4 billion of the country's outstanding debts to regain good international credit ratings and attract the attention of future markets. Nevertheless, her administration borrowed an additional $9 billion, increasing the national debt by $6 billion within six years since the ouster of President Marcos in 1986.

The Aquino administration sought to bring back fiscal discipline in order as it aimed to trim the government's budget deficit that ballooned during Marcos' term through privatization of bad government assets and deregulation of many vital industries. It was also during Aquino's term that vital economic laws such as the Build-Operate-Transfer Law, Foreign Investments Act and the Consumer Protection and Welfare Act were enacted.

The economy posted a positive growth of 3.4% during her first year in office. But in the aftermath of the 1989 coup attempt, the Philippine economy remained stagnant. In her final year in office, inflation had risen to 17%, and unemployment was slightly over 10%, higher than the Marcos' years.

=== Revolutionary government ===
Immediately after assuming the presidency, Aquino issued Proclamation No. 3, which established a revolutionary government. She abolished the 1973 Constitution that was in force during martial law, and instead promulgated the provisional 1986 Freedom Constitution, pending the ratification of a new Constitution by the people. This allowed Aquino to exercise both executive and legislative powers until the ratification of the new Philippine Constitution and the establishment of a new Congress in 1987.

Aquino and other top officials fired pro-Marcos governors and mayors, replacing them in all provinces with people loyal to Aquino. Aquino's new government was met with criticism from Defense Minister Juan Ponce Enrile and Vice President Salvador Laurel; constitutionalist and retired Supreme Court Justice Cecilia Muñoz-Palma also vehemently opposed the move. "To declare her government “revolutionary" and abolish the Batasan Pambansa was to behave no better than Dictator Marcos", Palma said. Homobono Adaza, who brokered the opposition coalition, "when the United Democratic Opposition (UNIDO) decided to support Cory for President, the agreement with Cory was that the type of government of Marcos would be continued, with Cory as ceremonial President, since everyone knew that Cory had no knowledge of how to run the country, and Cory admitted this." Enrile and Laurel subsequently resigned from Aquino's government.

=== Landmark legislation ===
Aquino promulgated two landmark legal codes: the Family Code of 1987, which reformed the civil law on family relations; and the Administrative Code of 1987, which reorganized the structure of the executive branch of government. Another landmark law enacted during her tenure was the 1991 Local Government Code, which devolved national government powers to local government units (LGUs); the new Code also enhanced the power of LGUs to enact local taxation measures and assured them of a share in the national revenue.

Likewise, Aquino closed down the Marcos-dominated Batasang Pambansa to prevent the new Marcos loyalist opposition from undermining her democratic reforms, and reorganized the membership of the Supreme Court to restore its independence. In May 1986, the reorganized Supreme Court declared the Aquino government as "not merely a de facto government but in fact and law a de jure government", whose legitimacy had been affirmed by the community of nations. This Supreme Court decision significantly affirmed the status of Aquino as the new, legitimate and rightful leader of the Philippines.

=== 1986 Constitutional Commission ===
To fast-track the restoration of a full constitutional government and the writing of a new charter, Aquino appointed 48 members of the 1986 Constitutional Commission (Con-Com), led by retired activist Supreme Court Associate Justice Cecilia Muñoz-Palma. The Con-Com completed its final draft in October 1986. On February 2, 1987, the new Constitution of the Philippines, which put strong emphasis on civil liberties, human rights and social justice, was overwhelmingly approved by the Filipino people. The ratification of the new Constitution was followed by the election of senators and congress that same year and the holding of local elections in 1988.

=== Agrarian reform ===
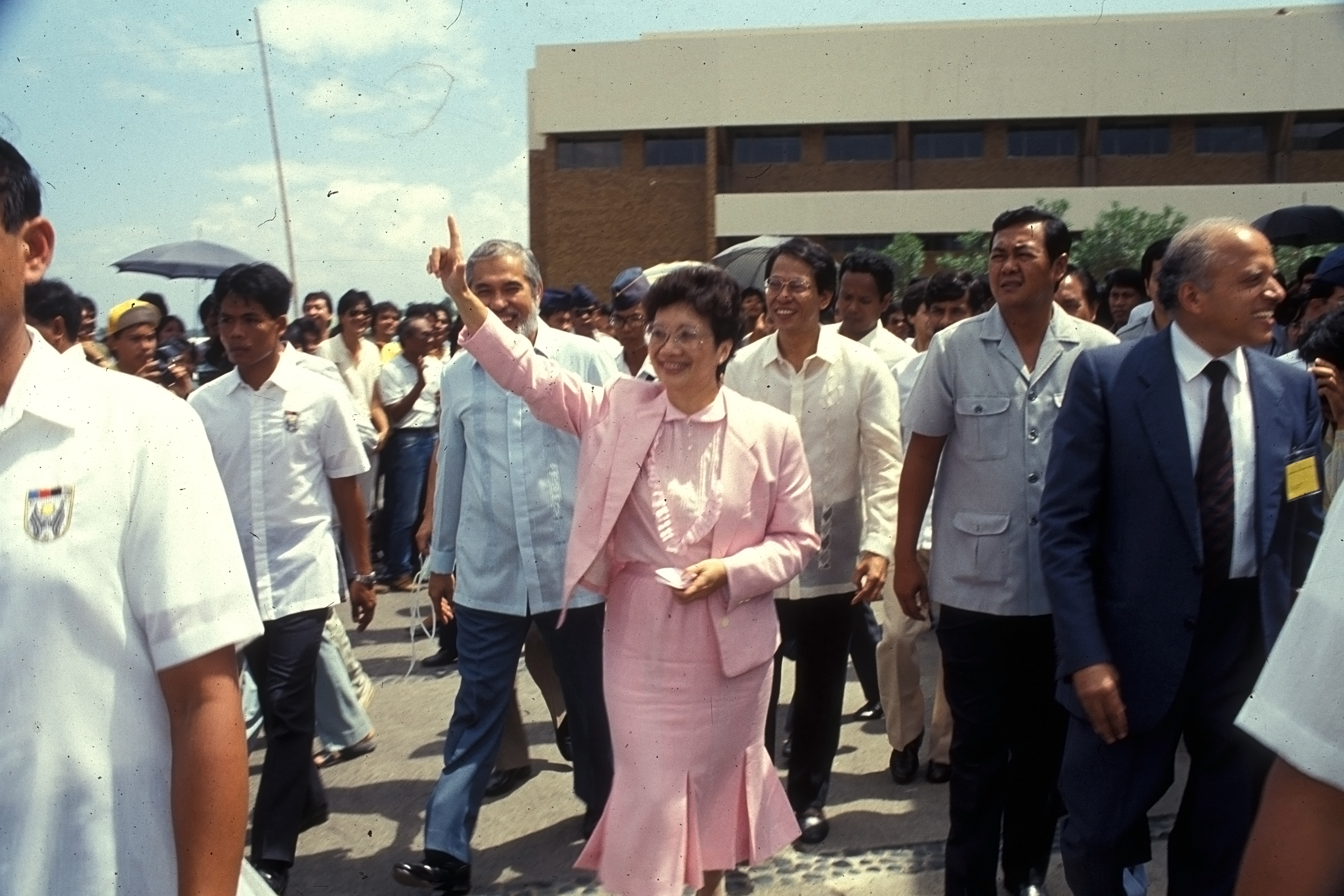
Aquino visits the IRRI in 1986.

Upon her ascension into power, President Aquino envisioned agrarian and land reform as the centerpiece of her administration's social legislative agenda. Her family background and social class as a privileged and landed daughter of a wealthy and landed clan became a lightning rod of criticisms against her land reform agenda. On January 22, 1987, agrarian workers and farmers marched to the historic Mendiola Street near Malacañan Palace to demand genuine land reform from Aquino's administration. The farmers' march turned bloody and violent when Marine forces fired at farmers who tried to go beyond the designated demarcation line set by the police. As a result, 12 farmers were killed and 19 were injured in this incident now known as the Mendiola massacre. This tragic incident led some prominent members of the Aquino Cabinet like the nationalist and progressive senator Jose W. Diokno to quit from their government posts. Though Aquino did not have any personal and official involvement with the drastic actions taken by some police elements, her administration has been faulted since then for failing to solve land disputes in the country.

In response to calls for agrarian reform, Aquino issued Presidential Proclamation 131 and Executive Order 229 on July 22, 1987, which outlined her land reform program, which included sugar lands. In 1988, with the backing of Aquino, the new Congress of the Philippines passed Republic Act No. 6657, more popularly known as the Comprehensive Agrarian Reform Law. The law paved the way for the redistribution of agricultural lands to tenant farmers from landowners, who were paid in exchange by the government through just compensation but were also allowed to retain not more than five hectares of land. Corporate landowners were also allowed under the law to "voluntarily divest a proportion of their capital stock, equity or participation in favor of their workers or other qualified beneficiaries", in lieu of turning over their land to the government for redistribution. Despite the flaws in the law, the Supreme Court upheld its constitutionality in 1989, declaring that the implementation of the Comprehensive Agrarian Reform Program (CARP), provided by the said law, was "a revolutionary kind of expropriation."

Despite the implementation of CARP, Aquino was not spared from the controversies that eventually centered on Hacienda Luisita, a 6,453-hectare (15,950-acre) estate located in the province of Tarlac, which was a shared inheritance among the Cojuangco clan. She was scored for allowing Hacienda Luisita, which was now owned by the Tarlac Development Corporation, to opt for stock distribution, instead of land redistribution. As such, ownership of agricultural portions of the hacienda were transferred to the corporation, which in turn, gave its shares of stocks to farmers.

The arrangement remained in force until 2006, when the Department of Agrarian Reform revoked the stock distribution scheme adopted in Hacienda Luisita, and ordered instead the redistribution of a large portion of the property to the tenant-farmers. The department stepped into the controversy when in 2004, violence erupted over the retrenchment of workers in the Hacienda, eventually leaving seven people dead.

=== Communist insurgency ===
Shortly after assuming the presidency, Aquino offered peace talks with the Communist Party of the Philippines-New Peoples Army (CPP-NPA) and released all political prisoners, including CPP leader Jose Maria Sison. A brief ceasefire between the government and the rebels groups which began in December 1986 collapsed a month after. Aquino, with the support of the military, conservatives, and the United States, launched a "total war policy" against the CPP-NPA. She signed an order creating a citizen armed force that would complement and support the regular forces of the military in responding to all types of threats to national security; she also criminalized rebellion to become punishable by life in prison.

=== Privatization ===
When Aquino assumed the presidency in 1986, ₱31 billion, slightly more than 25 percent of the government's budget, was allocated to public sector enterprises—government-owned or government-controlled corporations—in the form of equity infusions, subsidies, and loans. Aquino also found it necessary to write off ₱130 billion in bad loans granted by the government's two major financial institutions, the Philippine National Bank (PNB) and the Development Bank of the Philippines (DBP), "to those who held positions of power and conflicting interest under Marcos".

Burdened with 296 public sector enterprises, plus 399 other nonperforming assets transferred to the government by the PNB and the DBP, the Aquino administration established the Asset Privatization Trust in 1986 to dispose of government-owned and government-controlled properties. By early 1991, the Asset Privatization Trust had sold 230 assets with net proceeds of ₱14.3 billion. Another seventy-four public sector enterprises that were created with direct government investment were put up for sale; fifty-seven enterprises were sold wholly or in part for a total of about ₱6 billion. The government designated that about 30 percent of the original public sector enterprises be retained and expected to abolish another 20 percent. There was widespread controversy over the fairness of the divestment procedure and its potential to contribute to an even greater concentration of economic power in the hands of a few wealthy families.

After the 1986 EDSA Revolution, Aquino sequestered Marcos crony-owned radio and television stations such as the Banahaw Broadcasting Corporation, Radio Philippines Network and Intercontinental Broadcasting Corporation. On July 16 and September 14, 1986, ABS-CBN resumed its operations after 14 years of their closure; its TV station DWWX-TV and two radio stations were reopened.

=== Media and culture ===
Since 1986, Aquino adopted Original Pilipino Music (OPM) by issuing on July 25, 1987, Executive Order No. 255, which regularly broadcasts hourly OPM songs to all FM radio stations in Metro Manila and in the provinces to shape up Filipino culture.

After the EDSA revolution, she removed Maharlika Broadcasting System (MBS), a Marcos government-owned TV network; the network ceased transmitting on February 24, 1986. The name of MBS was changed to its interim name The New TV-4 but it was officially rebranded as the People's Television Network (PTV) in April 1986. On March 26, 1992, PTV made a government broadcaster for the first time under Republic Act 7306 when it was signed.

Aquino encouraged the tourism sector to boost the national economy. Under her six-year term, the Department of Tourism launched a program called The Philippines: Fiesta Islands of Asia in 1989; the program offered tourist visits in the country to show their natural wonders, to protect their indigenous peoples, to preserve heritage sites and to contribute historical importance.

=== Sports ===
Under Aquino's administration, Filipino athletes brought home several medals in international sports events. The 1986 Asian Games in Seoul, South Korea finished with the Philippines in sixth with 18 medals, the highest placement of the Philippines in two decades. In 1988, the 1988 Summer Olympics in Seoul, athlete Leopoldo Serantes got the bronze medal in the men's light flyweight division of boxing. Manila was to become the host city of the 1991 Southeast Asian Games and the host country finished second place to Indonesia. To ensure the standards of its athletes, the Philippine Sports Commission was established in 1990 as an institution to train future athletes in sports and international events.

=== Energy ===
The Philippines experienced daily power disruptions during a period of Aquino's administration. As part of Aquino's revitalized rural electrification program, Tawi-Tawi, the southernmost island province of the Philippines, started its regular 24-hour power service in 1989.

Aquino's decision to mothball the Bataan Nuclear Power Plant built during the Marcos administration due to dangers of environmental issues and safety of the Nuclear Power Plant, especially due to the recent Chernobyl nuclear disaster, contributed to the power crisis in the 1990s, as the 620 megawatts capacity of the plant was enough to cover the shortfall at that time.

== Foreign policies ==
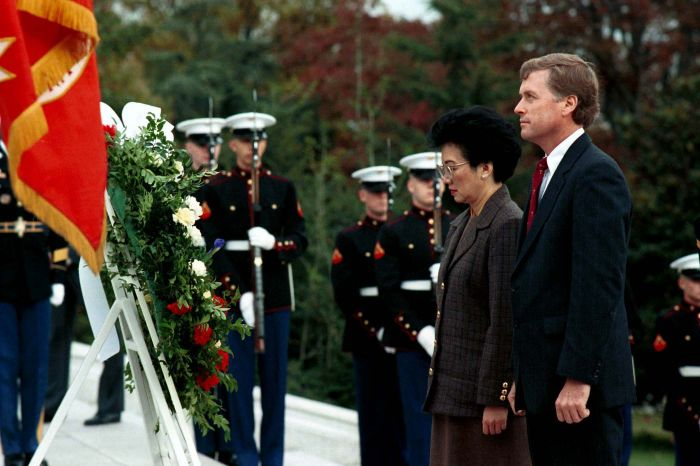
United States Vice President Dan Quayle and Philippine President Corazon Aquino in the Veterans Day Service at Arlington National Cemetery, November 10, 1989.

=== United States ===
==== U.S. visit and emergency aid ====
In September 1986, Aquino made her first state visit to the United States. She gave a speech in a joint session of the United States Congress with U.S. lawmakers wearing yellow ribbons symbolizing support to Aquino.

Following her speech in the United States Congress in 1986, the U.S. House of Representatives voted, 203 to 197, in favor of $200 million in emergency aid to her fledgling government. The vote, admitted Democrat Gerald Kleczka of Wisconsin, amounted to "legislating with our hearts instead of our heads." Indeed, the measure only added to a foreign-aid budget that is already likely to be deeply slashed by the Gramm-Rudman budget-balancing mechanism.

==== U.S. Bases Extension Treaty ====
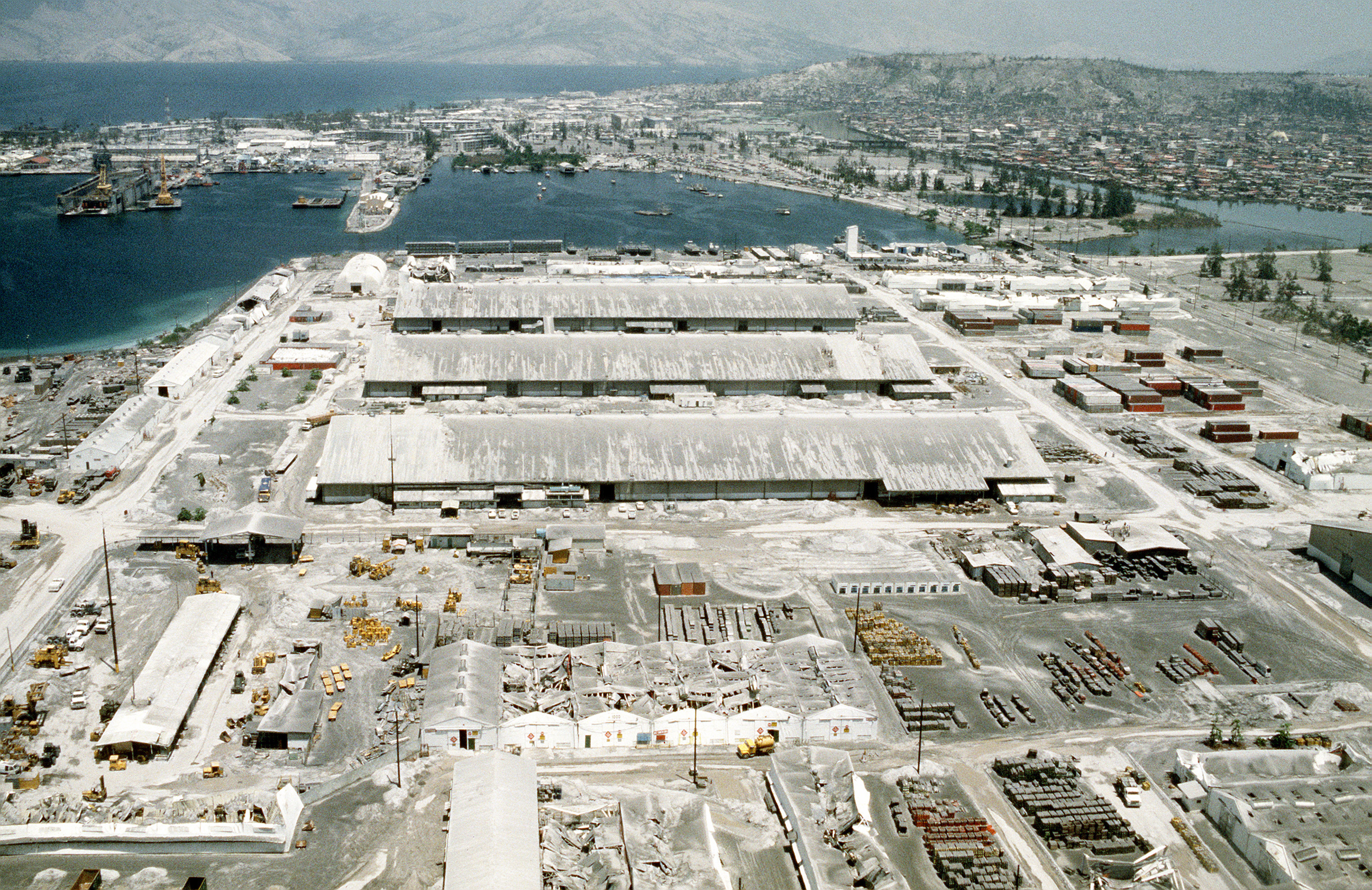
Ash from Mount Pinatubo covers Naval Station Subic Bay.

On June 15, 1991, Mount Pinatubo, just 20 miles (32 km) from Subic Bay, exploded with a force 8 times greater than the Mount St. Helens eruption. Day turned to night as volcanic ash blotted out the sun. Volcanic earthquakes and heavy rain, lightning and thunder from Typhoon Yunya passing over northern Luzon made Black Saturday a 36-hour nightmare. By the morning of June 16, when the volcano's fury subsided, Subic Bay, once one of the most beautiful and well-maintained Navy bases in the Pacific, lay buried under a foot of rain-soaked, sandy ash.

That night, the threat of continued eruptions combined with the lack of water and electricity led to the decision to evacuate all dependents. U.S. warships and cargo planes began the emergency evacuation of thousands of Navy and Air Force dependents. Seven Navy ships sailed June 17, with 6,200 dependents. A total of 17 ships, including the aircraft carriers, USS Abraham Lincoln and USS Midway evacuated all 20,000 dependents over the next few days. The evacuees were taken by ship to Mactan Air Base and then were airlifted by U.S. Air Force C-141 Starlifters to Andersen Air Force Base at Guam.

After the dependents were evacuated, an intense clean-up was begun. American service members and Filipino base employees, worked around the clock to restore essential services. Clark Air Base, much closer to Mount Pinatubo, was declared a total loss and plans for a complete closure were started. Within two weeks NAS Cubi Point was back in limited operation. Soon, most buildings had electricity and water restored. By mid-July service had been restored to most family housing units. The dependents began returning September 8, 1991, and by the end of the month almost all were back at Subic Bay from the United States.

Many months before the expiration of the Military Bases Agreement of 1947, intense negotiations between the governments of the United States and the Philippines began. These negotiations resulted in the Treaty of Friendship, Peace and Cooperation between the United States and the Philippines; this would have extended the lease of the American bases in the Philippines. On September 13, 1991, the Philippine Senate rejected the ratification of this treaty, citing a number of reasons for the rejection. This was a devastating blow to the Aquino administration, who were strongly pro-treaty and even called for a referendum by the Filipino people; a move that was declared unconstitutional.

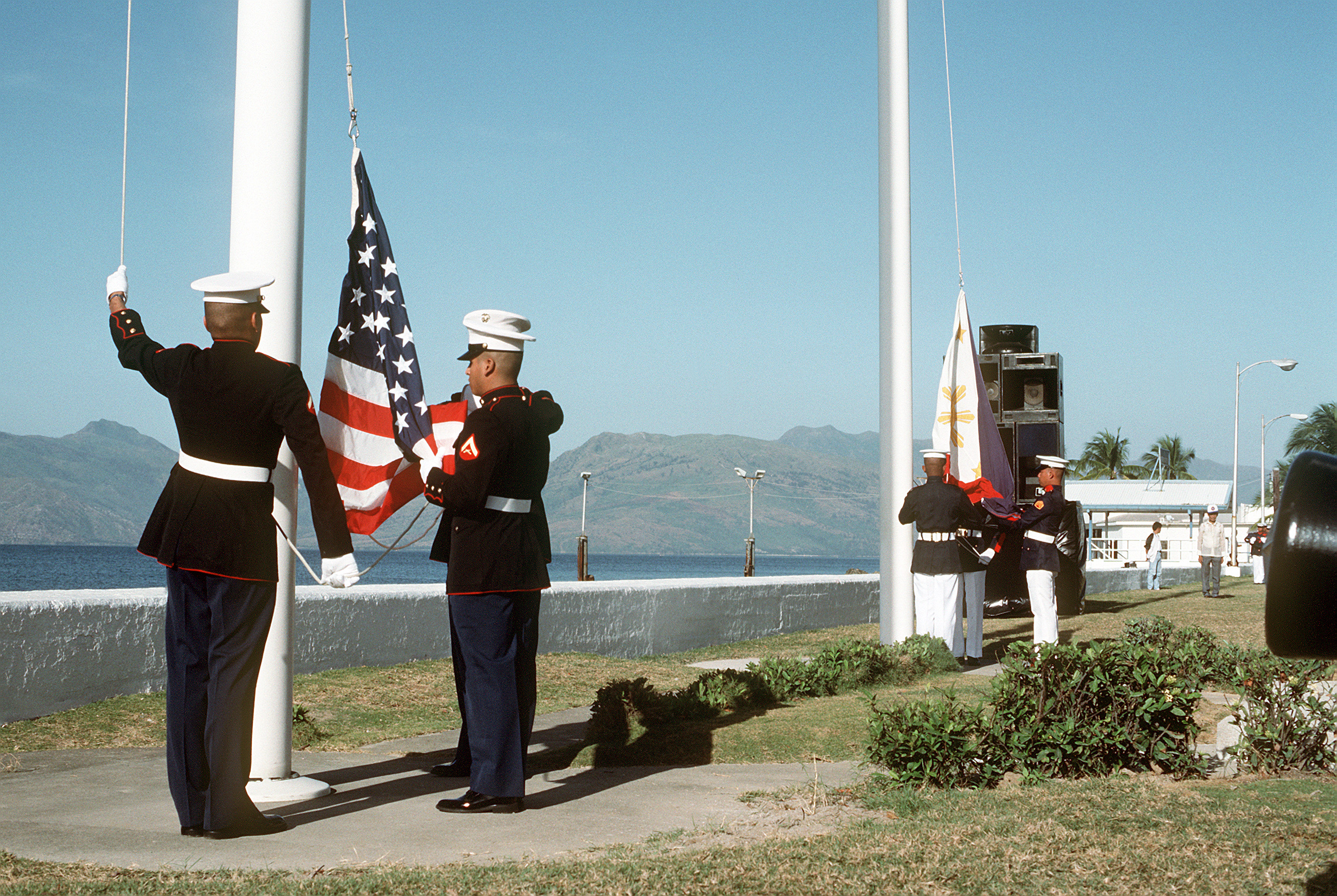
The American Flag is lowered and Philippine flag is raised during turnover of Naval Station Subic Bay.

In December 1991, the two governments were again in talks to extend the withdrawal of American forces for three years but this broke down as the United States refused to detail their withdrawal plans or to answer if nuclear weapons were kept on base. Finally on December 27, Aquino, who had previously fought to delay the U.S. pullout to cushion the country's battered economy, issued a formal notice for the U.S. to leave by the end of 1992. Naval Station Subic Bay was the U.S.'s largest overseas defense facility after Clark Air Base was closed.

During 1992, tons of material including drydocks and equipment, were shipped to various Naval Stations. Ship-repair and maintenance yards as well as supply depots were relocated to other Asian countries including Japan and Singapore. Finally, on November 24, 1992, the American Flag was lowered in Subic for the last time and the last 1,416 Sailors and Marines at Subic Bay Naval Base left by plane from NAS Cubi Point and by the USS Belleau Wood. This withdrawal marked the first time since the 16th Century that no foreign military forces were present in the Philippines.

=== Japan ===
Aquino worked towards restitution for some of the wrongs committed by Japan during World War II. New foreign aid agreements also were concluded during this visit. Aquino returned to Japan in 1989 for Hirohito's funeral and in 1990 for the enthronement of Emperor Akihito. After a series of talks with four prime ministers from Yasuhiro Nakasone from 1986 to 1987, to Kiichi Miyazawa from 1991 to 1992, the Japanese Government provided economic and trade relations between the two countries, massive inflow of Japanese investors and tourists, rehabilitation and construction of schools, hospitals and roads, and guaranteed justice for Filipino comfort women after World War II. Also in an official state visit, she and Prime Minister Noboru Takeshita received condolences in the wake of Doña Paz tragedy.

=== Soviet Union ===
Aquino met Soviet General Secretary Mikhail Gorbachev in a state visit in Moscow in 1987. Aquino and Gorbachev agreed that the Philippines and the Soviet Union established the two-nation economic ties and to promote their reforms based on the perestroika and glasnost systems paved their way to democracy, it also includes a Philippine–Soviet friendship. She returned between 1991 and 1992 for the state visit with President Boris Yeltsin since Russia was independent on December 25, 1991.

=== China and South Korea ===
In a state visit in China between Aquino and Chinese Premier Deng Xiaoping in 1988, the two leaders discussed the economic relations between the Philippines and China; she also visited Hong Jian village, the ancestral homes of the Conjuangcos, where her grandparents and children were born and raised before they migrated to the Philippines. Later, she went to South Korea between 1986 and 1988, for separate meetings with presidents Chun Doo-hwan and Roh Tae-woo in relation to Philippine–South Korean economic, social and cultural ties. Aquino and Roh also discussed unification talks between South and North Korea, which would have ended hostilities began during the Korean War in the 1950s.

=== ASEAN and U.N. ===
Aquino made her first state visits in Southeast Asia; she went to Singapore, then to Indonesia, in August 1986, for separate meetings with Singaporean Prime Minister Lee Kuan Yew and Indonesian President Suharto in order to build trade and economic ties between the three countries. She also went to Malaysia in November 1987 to discuss territorial disputes in Sabah with Prime Minister Mahathir Mohamad, and to Thailand and Brunei for separate meetings with Prime Minister Prem Tinsulanonda in April 1988, and Sultan Hassanal Bolkiah in August 1988. She and the member leaders of the Association of Southeast Asian Nations (ASEAN) met during ASEAN summits from 1986 to 1992.

Aquino went to the United Nations assembly in New York in July 1988 and made a speech during the 45th General Assembly; in her speech, Aquino spoke to the international community about democratic freedoms since the Philippines received freedom after the revolution in 1986, and promised to provide a resolution for the protection of migrant workers and their families. During the visit, she met with Secretary-General Javier Pérez de Cuéllar to discuss anti-poverty and anti-insurgency measures in the Philippines.

== 1987 legislative elections ==
Aquino's administration-coalition won 22 out of the 24 senate seats in the 1987 legislative election.

- Lakas ng Bayan (LABAN) coalition – composed of PDP–Laban, Lakas ng Bansa, UNIDO, Liberal Party-Salonga Wing, National Union of Christian Democrats, Philippine Democratic Socialist Party, Bandila and Pinaghiusa.
- Grand Alliance for Democracy (GAD) coalition – composed of the Nacionalista Party, Kilusang Bagong Lipunan, Liberal Party-Kalaw Wing, Partido Nacionalista ng Pilipinas, Christian Socialist Democratic Party, Mindanao Alliance and Muslim Federal Party
- UPP-KBL coalition – composed of Pro-Marcos forces.

== Military insurrections ==
=== Coup attempts (1986–1987) ===
From 1986 to 1987, there were six plots to overthrow the government of Aquino involving various members of the Armed Forces of the Philippines. A significant number of the military participants in these attempts belonged to the Reform the Armed Forces Movement (RAM) led by Gringo Honasan, while others were identified loyalists to former president Ferdinand Marcos, who had been deposed in February 1986. Two of the attempts—the November 1986 God Save the Queen Plot and the July 1987 plot—were uncovered and quashed by authorities before they could be operationalized. Excluding the August 1987 Philippine coup attempt, which left 53 people dead, the other plots were repelled with minimal or no violence.

=== 1989 coup attempt ===
The most serious coup d'état against the government of Aquino was staged beginning December 1, 1989, by members of the Armed Forces of the Philippines belonging to the Reform the Armed Forces Movement (RAM) and soldiers loyal to former President Ferdinand Marcos. Metro Manila was shaken by the coup, where the rebels almost gained full control of the presidential palace. The coup was completely defeated by Philippine Government forces on December 9, 1989.

The coup was led by Colonel Gregorio Honasan, General Edgardo Abenina, and retired General Jose Ma. Zumel. At the onset of the coup, the rebels seized Villamor Airbase, Fort Bonifacio, Sangley Airbase, Mactan Airbase in Cebu, and portions of Camp Aguinaldo. The rebels set patrols around the runway of Ninoy Aquino International Airport, effectively shutting it down. From Sangley Airbase, the rebels launched planes and helicopters which bombarded and strafed Malacañan Palace, Camp Crame and Camp Aguinaldo. Three hours after the fall of Villamor Air Base, Aquino went on air to address the people, assuring them that the government "shall smash this naked attempt once more." At that point, the counterattack of the government forces began. Seven army trucks headed for the headquarters of the government-owned station Channel 4, where fierce fighting occurred between the forces. Defense Secretary Fidel Ramos and AFP Chief-of-Staff Renato de Villa monitored the crises from Camp Crame, headquarters of the Philippine Constabulary. With loyal forces hard-pressed by the rebels, Aquino requested assistance from the US Military, and, at the behest of her military commanders, granted. 120 marines, part of the 800-strong U.S. contingent stationed at Subic Naval Base were deployed at the grounds of the US Embassy as a defensive measure. Aquino stated that the loyal forces lacked the ability to contain the rebel forces. American help was crucial to the Aquino cause, clearing the skies of rebel aircraft and allowing government military to consolidate their forces.

As the mutiny continued, Aquino declared an ultimatum for the rebels, giving them two choices, to surrender or to face death. Government F-5 jets went to the skies and challenged rebel planes, and culminated with the destruction of the rebel T-28 Trojans. Government forces would recapture all military bases by December 3 except for Mactan Airbase, but rebel forces retreating from Fort Bonifacio occupied 22 high-rise buildings along the Ayala business area in Makati. The government claimed the coup was crushed, but fierce fighting continued through the weekend; Camp Aguinaldo was set ablaze by the rebel howitzers.

The occupation of Makati lasted until December 7, surrendering full control of Mactan Airbase on December 9. The official casualty toll was 99 dead (including 50 civilians), with 570 more wounded.

The United States military supported the Aquino government during the coup. Operation "Classic Resolve" involved the use of U.S. airpower from the aircraft carriers Midway and Enterprise (CVN-65), and F-4 Phantom II fighters from Clark Air Base. The U.S. Air force jets retook the skies for Aquino. The U.S. planes had clearance to "...buzz the rebel planes at their base, fire in front of them if any attempted to take off, and shoot them down if they did."

Following the failure of this coup, Aquino established a fact-finding commission headed by then-COMELEC chair Hilario Davide, Jr. to investigate and provide a full report on the series of coup attempts against her government. The report would become known as the Davide Commission Report.

Participants of the December 1989 coup would later blame perceived deficiencies in the Aquino government in areas as graft and corruption, bureaucratic inefficiency, and lenient treatment of communist insurgents as the reasons for the coup. In response, the Davide Commission recommended several short-term and long-term counter-measures, including the establishment of a civilian national police force, a crackdown on corruption in the military, a performance review of appointive government officials, reforms in the process of military promotions, a review of election laws in time for the 1992 presidential elections, and a definitive statement on the part of Aquino on whether she intended to run for re-election in 1992.

== Controversies ==
=== Louie Beltran scandal ===
Louie Beltran, a Filipino journalist, became notorious for mentioning in a column about the 1987 coup attempt that Aquino had been hiding under the bed during the coup. For this statement, he was sued by Aquino for libel. Aquino went so far as to show journalists that she could not fit under her bed. Beltran, who openly expressed his belief that the President was lacking in competence, countered that his words were not meant to be taken literally, but Aquino still pursued the case against him and the STAR's editor-in-chief Maximo Soliven. On October 22, 1992, the court ruled in Aquino's favor, sentencing the columnist and his editor to 2 years of imprisonment and ordering them to pay 2 million pesos in moral damages. The Court of Appeals later reversed the decision of the trial court and acquitted Beltran.

== Natural disasters and calamities ==
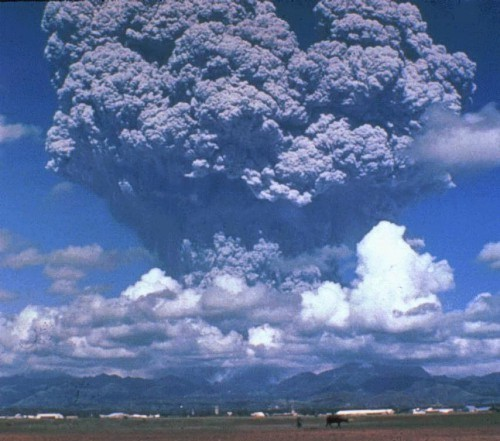
Eruption of Mount Pinatubo in 1991

During her last two years in office, Aquino's administration faced series of natural disasters and calamities. Among these were the 1990 Luzon earthquake, which left around 1,600 people dead; and the 1991 volcanic eruption of what was then thought to be a dormant Mount Pinatubo, which was the second largest terrestrial eruption of the 20th century, killing around 300 people and causing widespread long-term devastation of agricultural lands in Central Luzon. The worst loss of life occurred when Tropical Storm Thelma (also known as Typhoon Uring) caused massive flooding in Ormoc City in November 1991, leaving around 6,000 dead in what was considered to be the deadliest typhoon in Philippine history.

Under Aquino's term, the MV Doña Paz sank in December 1987, killing more than 1,700 people. A series of air disasters occurred in 1987 when Philippine Airlines PR 206 crashed into a mountain in Benguet with 50 passengers found dead on June 26.

From 1989 to 1993, a long El Niño phenomenon caused a severe drought in the country. Droughts destroyed crops in farmlands and livestock, which led to a nationwide food shortage, dwindling water supplies, a water shortage, and electric blackouts that left damage to the national economy worth billions of pesos. In response to the drought, Aquino declared the Philippines under a nationwide state of calamity.

== Blackouts and power crisis ==
During Aquino's presidency, Metro Manila experienced seven to 12 hours power outages associated with El Niño. Numerous businesses were brought to a halt. By the departure of Aquino in June 1992, businesses in Manila and nearby provinces had lost nearly $800 million since March 1992. According to David Sanger of the New Straits Times, the Aquino administration knew for years that country's power plants were failing, but did not act to solve the problem. It was only during the time of her successor, Fidel Ramos, that the government decisively solved the severe power outages that were common during her tenure.

== End of presidency ==
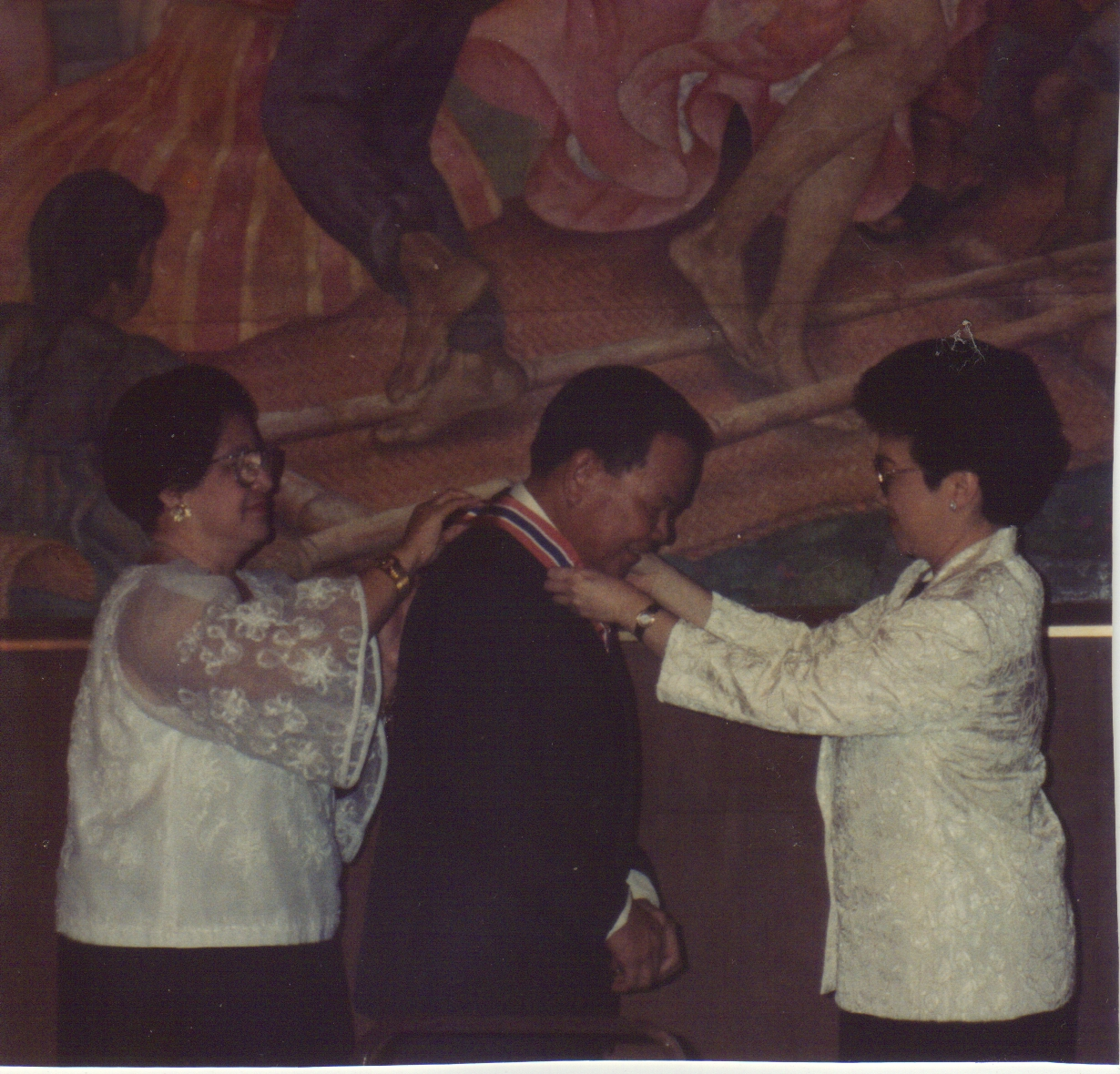
President Corazon C. Aquino bestows the Philippine Legion of Honor on outgoing Executive Secretary Catalino Macaraig, Jr., as Mrs. Araceli A. Macaraig assists her.

As the end of her presidency drew near, close advisers and friends told Aquino that since she was not inaugurated under the 1987 Constitution, she was still eligible to seek the presidency again in the upcoming 1992 elections, the first presidential elections under normal and peaceful circumstances since 1965. Aquino strongly declined the requests for her to seek reelection and wanted to set an example to both citizens and politicians that the presidency is not a lifetime position.

Initially, she named Ramon V. Mitra, a friend of her husband Ninoy and then Speaker of the Philippine House of Representatives, as her candidate for the presidential race in 1992. She instead threw her support behind the candidacy of her defense secretary and EDSA Revolution hero, General Fidel V. Ramos, who constantly stood by and defended her government from the various coup attempts and rebellions that were launched against her. Her sudden change of mind and withdrawal of support from Mitra drew criticisms not only from her supporters in the liberal and social democratic sectors but from the Roman Catholic Church, as well, which questioned her anointing of Ramos since the latter was a Protestant. Nevertheless, Aquino's candidate eventually won the 1992 elections, albeit by a margin of 23.58 percent of the total votes only, and was sworn in as the 12th President of the Philippines on June 30, 1992.

In contrast with previous inaugurations, Aquino attended the swearing-in of her successor at the Quirino Grandstand in Manila. As a final gesture as president, she rode the presidential limousine to the event and later left the venue aboard a Toyota sedan, a gift from her siblings, which was a strong symbol of her return to private life as "Citizen Cory".

== Approval ratings ==
SWS Net satisfaction ratings of Corazon Aquino (May 1986 – April 1992)
| Date | Rating |
|---|---|
| May 1986 | +53 |
| Oct 1986 | +72 |
| Mar 1987 | +69 |
| Oct 1987 | +36 |
| Feb 1988 | +64 |
| Aug 1988 | +57 |
| Sep 1988 | +50 |
| Feb 1989 | +37 |
| Aug 1989 | +32 |
| Sep 1989 | +29 |
| Mar 1990 | +24 |
| Apr 1990 | +37 |
| Nov 1990 | +7 |
| Apr 1991 | +24 |
| Jul 1991 | +10 |
| Nov 1991 | +10 |
| Feb 1992 | +13 |
| Apr 1992 | +7 |
| Average | +35 |
