= Aquino administration =

Aquino administration or Aquino presidency may either refer to:

- Presidency of Corazon Aquino
- Presidency of Benigno Aquino III
