= 1986 Philippine coup attempt =

The 1986 Philippine coup d'état attempt may refer to:

- People Power Revolution, a popular revolt preceded by a failed military coup.
- Coup attempts against Corazon Aquino, which also covers the July 1986 coup attempt at the Manila Hotel and the November 1986 attempt which was also known as the God Save the Queen plot.
