= Aquino Government =

The "Aquino Government" or "Aquino government" may refer to either of these two presidencies of the Philippines:

- the presidency of Corazon Aquino, or
- the presidency of Benigno Aquino III
