= Suprapto Martosetomo =

Indonesian diplomat (born 1954)

Ambassador of Indonesia to South Africa
- In office 14 February 2014 – 2017
- President: Susilo Bambang Yudhoyono; Joko Widodo
- Preceded by: Sjahril Sabaruddin
- Succeeded by: Salman Al Farisi

Ambassador of Indonesia to the Holy See
- In office 5 September 2007 – 2011
- President: Susilo Bambang Yudhoyono
- Preceded by: Bambang Prayitno
- Succeeded by: Budiarman Bahar

Personal details
- Born: 24 April 1954 (age 72) Genteng, Banyuwangi Regency, Indonesia
- Spouse: Yogyaswara Kustantina Suprapto
- Children: 2
- Education: Gadjah Mada University (Drs.)

Suprapto Martosetomo (born 24 April 1954) is an Indonesian diplomat who served as ambassador to the Vatican from 2007 to 2011 and ambassador to South Africa, concurrently accredited to Lesotho, Swaziland, and Botswana, from 2013 to 2017. Prior to his ambassadorial tenures, he served in various postings abroad, including as advisor to the foreign minister for institutional affairs.

== Early life and education ==
He was born in Genteng, Banyuwangi on 24 April 1954, as the sixth of seven children of a trader couple. He was born and raised in a Muslim family, but his extended family includes Christian relatives, including an aunt from his father's side who became a nun. Upon completing his primary education at the 1st Yogyakarta State High School, he studied international relations at Gadjah Mada University in Yogyakarta, graduating with a bachelor's degree in 1981.

== Diplomatic career ==
Suprapto began his diplomatic service in the foreign department on 25 March 1982. After completing his basic diplomatic education in 1984, he served as the chief of government and NGO relations section within the information department of Indonesia's ASEAN national secretariat from 1985 to 1986. He then received his first overseas assignment at the economic section of the embassy in Manila, Philippines, with the diplomatic rank of third secretary from 1986 to 1990. During the 1989 Philippine coup attempt against Philippine President Corazon Aquino, his house became a temporary refuge for Indonesian students, who had their residence in Metro Manila occupied by soldiers.

Upon returning to Indonesia, he served as the chief of Non-Aligned Movement economic section within the directorate general of foreign economic relations from 1990 to 1992. His diplomatic service continued with a posting at the consular section of the consulate in Karachi, Pakistan, with the rank of second secretary. After the consulate was upgraded to a consulate general in 1993, by the next year he was promoted to the rank of first secretary and became the chief of economic affairs, serving until 1996.

After four years in Pakistan, Suprapto became the deputy director (chief of subdirectorate) for European affairs in the directorate of trade relations from 1996 to 1999. His next foreign assignment was as the head of the economic section at the embassy in London, United Kingdom, from 1999 to 2004. On 7 January 2004, Suprapto was installed as the chief of the agency for policy assessment and development for international organizations. After a year's stint, on 12 February 2005 he became the secretary of the foreign department's agency for policy assessment and development.

On 5 September 2007, Suprapto was sworn in as ambassador to the Holy See. He presented his credentials to Pope Benedict XVI on 12 November 2007. As ambassador, Suprapto prioritized inter-religious dialogue, citing the importance of bridging the gap between the West and Islam, and actively participated in international forums such as the World Peace Forum and the International Meeting of Prayer for Peace. After serving in Vatican, he briefly became the acting director general of ASEAN Cooperation before being sworn is as the foreign minister's advisor (expert staff) for institutional relations on 12 April 2012. During his tenure, he led an investigation team on the shooting of three Indonesian immigrant workers by the Malaysian police under the pretext of a possible robbery. He was also responsible for supervising 2014 Indonesian general election overseas.

In September 2013, Suprapto was nominated by President Susilo Bambang Yudhoyono as ambassador to South Africa, with concurrent accreditation to Lesotho, Swaziland, and Botswana. After undergoing an assessment by the House of Representative's first commission on 18 September 2013, Suprapto was sworn in on 14 February 2014. He presented his credentials to the President of South Africa Jacob Zuma on 14 May 2014 and President of Botswana Ian Khama on 18 February 2015. As ambassador, he actively encouraged Indonesian businesses to explore investment and market opportunities in South Africa, citing its advanced infrastructure and strategic position as a gateway to neighboring countries.

== Personal life ==
Suprapto Martosetomo is married to Yogyaswara Kustantina Suprapto and has two children.
