= Coup attempts against Corazon Aquino =

1986–1990 plots to overthrow Philippine President Corazon Aquino

From 1986 to 1987, there were several plots to overthrow Philippine President Corazon Aquino involving various members of the Armed Forces of the Philippines. A significant number of the military participants in these attempts belonged to the Reform the Armed Forces Movement (RAM), while others were identified loyalists of former President Ferdinand Marcos, who had been deposed in the People Power Revolution in late February 1986.

Two attempts—the November 1986 "God Save the Queen Plot" and the July 1987 plot—were uncovered and quashed by authorities before they could be operationalized. The other plots were repelled with little or no violence, the deadliest being the August 1987 coup attempts which left 53 dead. An even more serious coup attempt would be staged against the Aquino government in December 1989. Following the plot's failure, President Aquino established a fact-finding commission of inquiry headed by then-COMELEC Chairman Hilario Davide Jr. The report would become known as the Davide Commission Report, and it was mandated to investigate and provide a full report on the series of coup attempts against the Aquino government.

== 1986 attempts ==
=== Manila Hotel plot ===
The first occurred on July 6, 1986, when some 490 armed soldiers and 15,000 civilians loyal to former President Ferdinand Marcos occupied Manila Hotel for 37 hours. At the hotel, Marcos's vice-presidential running mate Arturo Tolentino announced that Marcos had authorized him to temporarily take over the government, took his oath as Acting President, and designated a cabinet. One of the rebel leaders was Brigadier General Jose Maria Zumel. The public remained generally unaffected by this incident, and it ended without violence by July 8.

=== "God Save the Queen" Plot ===
A more serious conspiracy unfolded some months later, known as the "God Save the Queen Plot". The Davide Commission concluded that Defense Secretary Enrile and members of the Reform the Armed Forces Movement (RAM) were behind the plot. Scheduled for November 11, 1986, the plot was discovered by government several days in advance and was deliberately leaked to the Philippine Daily Inquirer, thus thwarting the plan.

The government then learnt that the plot was rescheduled for November 22, 1986. On November 22, the military was placed on red alert and the rebel troops were blockaded, leading them to return to barracks. The following day, Aquino announced she had sacked Enrile as Defense Secretary and that she would revamp her Cabinet, "to give the government a chance to start all over again."

The murders of labor leaders Rolando Olalia and Leonor Alay-ay by members of the RAM on November 6, 1986, and of activist Lean Alejandro the following year are believed to have been planned as part of the God Save the Queen coup plot. The surveillance of Olalia and labor minister Augusto "Bobbit" Sanchez have also been linked to the plot.

== 1987 attempts ==
=== GMA-7 incident ===
From January 27–29, 1987, around 100 soldiers led by Colonel Oscar Canlas seized the main compound of GMA Network in Quezon City, while other troops attempted in vain to capture Sangley Point Air Force Base in Cavite. One rebel soldier was killed, while 35 people were injured.

In the early morning of January 1, 1991, former lieutenant colonel Rodolfo Calzado was captured without resistance in Paco Park, Manila by the Philippine Air Force for masterminding the plan to capture Sangley Point, and was sentenced to 12 years in prison.

On August 28, 1992, 16 military rebels who took part in the takeover of GMA were temporarily released from detention and placed in the custody of their respective service commanders on orders from President Fidel Ramos.

=== Black Saturday incident ===
On Black Saturday 1987 (April 18), 13 rebel soldiers staged a raid on Fort Bonifacio. It was repelled within the morning, with one rebel soldier dead.

=== MIA plot ===
In July 1987, a plot to stage another coup attempt through a military takeover of Manila International Airport was uncovered before it could be implemented, with four officers being court-martialled for the plot.

=== August coup attempt ===
On August 28, 1987, the most serious attempt up to then to overthrow Aquino's government was launched by members of the Reform the Armed Forces Movement led by Colonel Gregorio Honasan, who had been a former top aide of Enrile. In the early morning, rebel soldiers launched an attack on Malacañang Palace. The siege was repelled within a few hours, with several military and civilian casualties including Aquino's son, the future President Benigno Aquino III, who was wounded. Honasan himself led the soldiers that seized portions of Camp Aguinaldo, including the headquarters of the Department of National Defense. Rebel soldiers also seized parts of Villamor Airbase, Camp Aguinaldo, three television stations in Manila, military camps in Pampanga and Cebu, and the airport in Legaspi City. Various statements broadcast by the rebels referred to "the overindulgence in politics which now pervades in society", the supposed mishandling of the communist insurgency, and the deplorable economic condition of the military rebels. By day's end, government troops were able to recapture most of the rebel-held facilities, and the coup fizzled out by the 29th. Fifty-three were dead and more than 200 wounded; many of the fatalities were unarmed civilians who were fired upon by rebels after they were jeered by the crowd. Honasan himself evaded capture, while Enrile (by then a Senator), denied involvement in the coup. Honasan would eventually be captured by the military in a house in Valle Verde, Pasig on December 9, 1987, but escaped in 1988.

Following the coup attempt, the Aquino government veered to the right, dismissing perceived left-leaning officials such as Executive Secretary Joker Arroyo and tacitly authorizing the establishment of armed, quasi-military groups to combat the ongoing communist insurgency. It was also believed that General Fidel Ramos—who remained loyal to Aquino—emerged as the second-most-powerful person in government following his successful quelling of the coup. Across-the-board wage increases for soldiers were also granted. Aquino herself meanwhile sued Philippine Star columnist Louie Beltran for libel after he wrote that the President hid under her bed when the Palace was under siege.

In January 1991, former navy seaman Jose Pedragoza was arrested by the Criminal Investigation Service for his involvement in the takeover of the People's Television Network station. In October 1992, rebellion charges against the former Constabulary Colonel Reynaldo Cabauatan were dismissed by the Quezon City Regional Trial Court due to the prosecution's failure to locate their witnesses for the trial.

== 1989 coup attempt ==
The most serious coup attempt against the Aquino administration on December 1, 1989, when an alliance of RAM and Marcos loyalist soldiers launched a series of coordinated attacks on government and broadcast facilities such as Camp Aguinaldo, Camp Crame, Fort Bonifacio, Villamor Air Base, Sangley Air Base and Malacañang Palace. Three rebel T-28D Trojans raked Malacañang with rockets and gunfire. The rebel soldiers wrongly assumed that they achieved air superiority by effectively neutralizing the assets of the 5th Fighter Wing of the Philippine Air Force. Rebel soldiers in Mactan successfully trapped most of the F-5s and combat-ready pilots, preventing them from interfering with rebel operations. Meanwhile, at Basa Air Base, only three F-5A and an F-5B remained partial mission capability.

Squadron Commander Danilo Atienza of the 6th Tactical Fighter Squadron (Cobras) ordered his maintenance crew to expedite bringing the F-5s back to full operation. Later that same day, three F-5s under Atienza's command fought the rebel T-28s, culminating in the destruction of the Tora-Tora on the ground at Sangley Point.

The elimination of the T-28s turned the tide against the rebels, but at the cost of the F-5A flown by Atienza, who died in one of the strafing runs. Atienza was awarded the Medal of Valor for his heroism, and the airfield at Sangley Point was renamed in his memory. Had it not been for the intervention, the Aquino government would have been overthrown.

Controversy later ensued when the Aquino administration asked for assistance from the United States government, which deployed F-4 fighter jets stationed at Clark Air Base to fly over Manila to intimidate the rebels. After most of the rebel assaults failed, a significant number of soldiers then proceeded to occupy the central business district of Makati in what turned into a weeklong standoff that trapped hundreds of civilians, both domestic and foreign, and undermined confidence in the Philippine economy. The siege ended after an agreement was reached for the soldiers to return to barracks.

== 1990 attempts ==
=== March coup attempt ===
On March 4, former RAM member and suspended Cagayan governor Rodolfo Aguinaldo directed his private army estimated at 300 men to seize the Hotel Delfino in Cagayan's capital of Tuguegarao following his indictment on charges of rebellion and murder relating to his support for the 1989 coup attempt against Aquino. Brig. Gen. Oscar Florendo, armed forces chief of Civil Military Relations, was sent to Tuguegarao by Aquino to serve Aguinaldo with an arrest warrant. After Aguinaldo's men seized control of Hotel Delfino where the general was staying, Florendo was taken hostage along with more than 50 other hotel guests. Though he was thought to have been a long-time friend of Aguinaldo's, Florendo was shot at close range in the hotel and later died of his wounds. Hours of standoff ensued between the two sides until nearly 1,000 government troops launched an attack to dislodge Aguinaldo's forces from the hotel; government forces prevailed after more than 100 of Aguinaldo's men surrendered and about 90 were captured. During this siege at least a dozen others were killed in or around the hotel; scores of civilian supporters of Aguinaldo were arrested; and a truck with assault rifles, mortars, and crates of ammunition was captured. Following the melee, Aguinaldo fled with about 90 fighters for mountains in the north.

=== October coup attempt ===
The last coup attempt against President Aquino happened on October 4, when mutinying soldiers staged a dawn raid on army bases in Mindanao. The seizure lasted for two days, ending with Col. Alexander Noble capitulating to the government on October 6.

== See also ==
- Corazon Aquino
