= Victor Batac =

Filipino general

Police Director Victor Batac

Personal details
- Education: Philippine Military Academy (BS)
- Police career
- Service: Philippine Constabulary (1971–1991); Philippine National Police
- Divisions: Directorate for Logistics
- Rank: Police Director

Victor Batac was the former director of the Directorate for Logistics of the Philippine National Police.

== Early years ==
Vic Batac entered the Philippine Military Academy as plebe on April 1, 1967 in Class of '71 (Matatag) - which is a graduating class known for prominent politicians such as Senators Gregorio Honasan and Panfilo Lacson, and distinguished career military and police officers such as Narciso Abaya, Romeo Dominguez, Reynaldo Alcasid, Neon Ebuen, Rex Piad, and Virtus Gil to name a few.

== Military and Political career ==
After graduating from the PMA, Vic Batac joined the Philippine Constabulary.

In the early 1980s, as the nation was awakened by the Ninoy Aquino assassination, he along with Lt. Col. Gringo Honasan, and Red Kapunan formed the Reform the Armed Forces Movement (RAM), a rightist reform-minded corps of officers within the Armed Forces of the Philippines (AFP). RAM called for the end of corruption and patronage politics in the senior leadership of the Armed Forces.

As the Marcos government was bringing the country to economic and political downward spiral, the RAM officers along with Defense Minister Juan Ponce Enrile made plans to overthrow the President. Pres. Marcos called for elections to be held in Feb 1986, the end result of which the incumbent president winning a landslide victory over contender Corazon Aquino, the widow of Ninoy Aquino.

Vic Batac along with Col. Jose T. Almonte's roles during the People Power Revolution was to form a think-tank and prepare the necessary operational plans and strategies of the group.
