= 1989 Philippine coup attempt =

Failed military overthrow of President Corazon Aquino

- Part of Coup attempts against Corazon Aquino
Date	December 1–9, 1989
Location	Villamor Airbase, Camp Crame, Fort Bonifacio, Cavite Naval Base (Philippine Navy), Sangley Point Air Base (Philippine Air Force), Mactan Airbase, Cebu, Malacañang Palace and portions of Makati, Manila, Quezon City around Metropolis and Camp Aguinaldo
Result	Philippine government victory; Coup averted; Creation of the Davide Fact-Finding Commission; Flight of Honasan and arrest of coup plotters, financiers and leaders but some were given amnesty later on; Family and remains of Ferdinand Marcos remains exiled in Hawaii until 1991

Belligerents
Philippines United States (minor air support)	Reform the Armed Forces Movement

Commanders and leaders
Corazon Aquino (President); Fidel Ramos; Renato De Villa	Gregorio Honasan; Edgardo Abenina; Jose Zumel (Philippines) Salvador Laurel; Proceso Maligalig

Military support
Armed Forces of the Philippines	RAM Loyalists from the AFP

Casualties and losses
- 99 dead (including 50 civilians) and 570 wounded

The 1989 Philippine coup attempt was the most serious attempted coup d'état against the government of Philippine President Corazon Aquino and part of a series of coup attempts against her. It was staged beginning December 1, 1989, by members of the Armed Forces of the Philippines belonging to the Reform the Armed Forces Movement (RAM) and soldiers loyal to former President Ferdinand Marcos. Metro Manila was shaken by this Christmas-time coup, which almost seized Malacañang Palace. It was completely defeated by the Philippine government by December 9, 1989.

== Background ==
Philippine politics between 1986 and 1991 was punctuated by Aquino's struggle to survive physically and politically a succession of coup attempts, culminating in a large, bloody, and well-financed attempt in December 1989. This attempt involved upwards of 3,000 troops, including elite Scout Rangers and marines, in a coordinated series of attacks on Camp Crame and Camp Aquinaldo, Fort Bonifacio, Cavite Naval Base, Villamor Air Base, and on Malacañang Palace itself, which was dive-bombed by vintage T-28 aircraft.

Although Aquino was not hurt in this raid, the situation appeared desperate, military commanders around the country waited to see which side would triumph in Manila.

== Coup ==
The coup was led by military officers, including Lt. Colonel Gregorio Honasan, General Edgardo Abenina, General Jose Ma. Zumel and Captain Proceso Maligalig, and staged by an alliance of the RAM, led by Honasan, and Zumel. At the onset of the coup, the rebels seized Villamor Airbase, Fort Bonifacio, Sangley Airbase, Mactan Airbase in Cebu, and portions of Camp Aguinaldo. The rebels set patrols around the runway of Ninoy Aquino International Airport effectively shutting it down. From Sangley Airbase, the rebels launched planes and helicopters which bombarded and strafed Malacañang Palace, Camp Crame and Camp Aguinaldo.

Three hours after the fall of Villamor Air Base, Aquino went on air to address the nation, and said that "We shall smash this naked attempt once more". At that point the government counterattack began. Seven army trucks headed for Channel 4, and fierce fighting occurred there. Ramos and Renato de Villa monitored the crises from Camp Crame, the Constabulary headquarters.

With loyal forces hard-pressed by the rebels, Aquino requested U.S. military assistance, at the behest of her military commanders, which was granted. 120 marines, part of an 800-strong U.S. contingent stationed at Subic Naval Base, were deployed at the grounds of the U.S. Embassy as a defensive measure. President Aquino stated that the loyal forces lacked the ability to contain the rebel forces. American help was crucial to the Aquino cause, clearing the skies of rebel aircraft and allowing loyalists to consolidate their forces.

While many mutineers surrendered, Aquino declared: "We leave them two choices; Surrender or die". Government F-5 jets sortied and challenged rebel planes culminating in the destruction of the rebel T-28 Trojans. Government forces recaptured all military bases save for Mactan Airbase by December 3, but rebel forces retreating from Fort Bonifacio occupied 22 high-rise buildings along the Ayala business area in Makati. The government claimed the coup was crushed, but fierce fighting continued through the weekend, with Camp Aguinaldo set ablaze by the rebel howitzers. The occupation of Makati lasted until December 7, while the rebels surrendered Mactan Airbase on December 9. The official casualty toll was 99 dead (including 50 civilians) and 570 wounded.

The United States military supported the Aquino government during this coup. Operation "Classic Resolve" involved the use of US airpower from the aircraft carriers USS Midway and USS Enterprise and F-4 Phantom II fighters from Clark Air Base. The United States Air Force jets retook the skies for Aquino. The US planes had clearance to "...buzz the rebel planes at their base, fire in front of them if any attempted to take off, and shoot them down if they did".

== American involvement ==
Aquino found it necessary to request United States support to put down this uprising. Then Chairman of the Joint Chiefs of Staff General Colin Powell recalled Aquino calling the White House and asking for the USAF to bomb a nearby air base to prevent the aircraft from attacking Malacañang Palace. Powell and Admiral Huntington Hardisty instead decided to instruct US F-4 pilots to take off from Clark Air Base and buzz the mutinous air base in a manner that demonstrated "extreme hostile intent," with further instructions to shoot down any planes that did takeoff. In November–December 1989, US forces moved to evacuate Americans during the coup attempt, and generally protect US interests in the Philippines. During this operation, a large special operations force was formed, USAF fighter aircraft patrolled above rebel air bases, and two aircraft carriers were positioned off the Philippines.

In early December 1989, USS Enterprise participated in Operation Classic Resolve, President Bush's response to Philippine President Corazon Aquino's request for air support during the rebel coup attempt. Bush approved the use of US F-4 fighter jets stationed at Clark Air Base on Luzon to buzz the rebel planes at their base, fire in front of them if any attempted to take off, and shoot them down if they did. The buzzing by US planes soon contributed to the collapse of the coup. On December 2, 1989, President Bush reported that on December 1 US fighter planes from Clark Air Base in the Philippines had assisted the Aquino government to repel a coup attempt. In addition, 100 marines were sent from the US Navy base at Subic Bay to protect the US Embassy in Manila. Meanwhile, USS Enterprise remained on station while conducting operations in the waters outside Manila Bay before departing on December 10th.

CIA documents suggested that Aquino asked for assistance for air strikes against RAM positions, but Washington declined since it was a "political risk".

== Effects ==
=== Political and economic fallout ===
The failed coup weakened Aquino politically. Her vice president, Salvador Laurel, openly allied himself with the coup plotters and called for her to resign. Even Aquino's staunchest supporters saw her need for United States air support as a sign of weakness. Most damaging of all, when the last rebels finally surrendered, they did so in a triumphant televised parade and with a promise from the government that they would be treated "humanely, justly, and fairly." Business leaders estimated that the mutiny cost the economy US$1.5 billion.

=== Davide Commission ===
Following the failure of this coup, President Aquino established a fact-finding commission headed by COMELEC chair Hilario Davide Jr. to investigate and provide a full report on the series of coup attempts against her government. The report became known as the Davide Commission Report.

Participants of the December 1989 coup later blamed perceived deficiencies in the Aquino government in areas such as graft and corruption, bureaucratic inefficiency, and lenient treatment of communist insurgents as the reasons for the coup. In response, the Davide Commission recommended several short-term and long-term countermeasures, including the establishment of a civilian national police force, a crackdown on corruption in the military, a performance review of appointive government officials, reforms in the process of military promotions, a review of election laws in time for the 1992 presidential elections, and a definitive statement on the part of Aquino on whether she intended to run for re-election in 1992.

=== Later mutinies ===
In 1990, there were other mutinies in March and October. The Hotel Delfino siege happened on March 4, when Cagayan governor Rodolfo Aguinaldo, who was suspended and indicted for supporting the 1989 coup, directed his private army estimated at 300 men to seize the provincial capital of Tuguegarao. Brig. Gen. Oscar Florendo, armed forces chief of Civil Military Relations, was dispatched by President Aquino to serve Aguinaldo with an arrest warrant. Florendo was taken hostage in the Hotel Delfino along with more than 50 other guests. After hours of standoff between the two sides, nearly 1,000 government troops launched an attack to dislodge Aguinaldo's forces from the hotel; the government prevailed when more than 100 of Aguinaldo's men surrendered and about 90 were captured. Florendo was shot at the Delfino by one of Aguinaldo's men and later died of his wounds. At least a dozen others were killed in or around the hotel; scores of civilian supporters of Aguinaldo were arrested; and a truck with assault rifles, mortars, and crates of ammunition was captured. During this melee, Aguinaldo fled with about 90 fighters for mountains in the north.

Seven months later on October 4, the ninth and last coup attempt happened in two army bases in Mindanao where Col. Alexander Noble and his forces mutinied for two days until they surrendered on October 6.

== See also ==
- Coup attempts against Corazon Aquino

== Bibliography ==
- The Davide Fact-Finding Commission (1990). The Final Report of the Fact-Finding Commission (pursuant to R.A. No. 6832) (PDF). Makati: Bookmark Inc. p. 118. ISBN 971-569-003-3. Archived from the original (PDF) on April 27, 2021 – via Official Gazette of the Republic of the Philippines.
