= Reform the Armed Forces Movement =

1982–1990s cabal of Philippine military officers

- RAM logo during the 1980s
- Leaders: Gregorio Honasan; Victor Batac; Eduardo Kapunan
- Active regions: Philippines
- Status: Inactive; Defunct since 2024 (merged into Reform PH)

The Reform the Armed Forces Movement, also referred to by the acronym RAM, was a cabal of officers of the Armed Forces of the Philippines (AFP) known for several attempts to seize power in the Philippines during the 1980s and 1990s. In 1986, some of these officers launched a failed coup d'état against Ferdinand Marcos, prompting a large number of civilians to attempt to prevent Marcos from wiping the RAM rebels out. This eventually snowballed into the 1986 People Power revolution which ended the dictatorship of Ferdinand Marcos and forced him into exile. RAM later attempted six coups d'état against the administration of Corazon Aquino.

== Formation ==
From being an apolitical and professional organization, the AFP during the Marcos administration became highly politicized, and promotions were given not through merit but through affiliation or patronage. This led to the formation of various cabals in the Armed Forces, including the Diablo Squad which would later be named the Guardian Brotherhood, Inc., and the Reform the Armed Forces Movement.

The Reform the Armed Forces Movement was founded on July 23, 1982 by a group of junior military officers who were disgruntled by the patronage politics and corruption in the Armed Forces of the Philippines. Its stated goal was to "reform the service, foster nationalism and patriotism, and fight against corruption and criminal activities." As well as tackle the "problem of favoritism, incompetence, and corruption in senior leadership."

Three members of the Philippine Military Academy Matatag Class of 1971, Gregorio Honasan, Victor Batac, and Eduardo Kapunan, were the key founders of the group, and most of its members came from the Class of 1971. The first officers to join RAM were mostly members of the PMA classes 1971 through 1984 - soldiers who had spent their careers during the Martial Law era and the "Bagong Lipunan" era which followed it, all under the command of Ferdinand Marcos as Commander in Chief.

RAM was placed under the leadership of the Ministry of National Defense security and intelligence force, then commanded by then Army Colonel Gregorio Honasan, who was also then the chief security officer of then-Defense Minister Juan Ponce Enrile, who gave the blessing in forming the organization because Enrile also wanted reforms in the military.

== Statement of Common Aspirations and first public protest ==
RAM began developing their "statements of aspirations" in February 1985, eventually developing a position paper on March 21, 1985, entitled “We Belong . . . ,” which was short for its opening statement, “We Belong to the Reform the Armed Forces Movement.” The various preliminary documents leading up to this position paper were printed in a pamphlet which the RAM entitled “Crossroads to Reform.”

The RAM then made their existence public at the March 21, 1985 Philippine Military Academy reunion. About 300 officers under the RAM, mostly from the PMA Classes of 1971 to 1984, broke away from their parade ground line and unfurled a banner which said “Unity Through Reforms.” Wearing T-shirts that said “We Belong,” these officers marked the first public protest of the military during the Marcos regime.

== Failed coup against Marcos and role in the People Power Revolution ==
=== February 1986 coup ===
When revelations of cheating during 1986 Philippine presidential election came out in February 1982, RAM forces under the leadership of Defense Minister Juan Ponce Enrile wanted to take advantage of the social instability and plotted to unseat Ferdinand Marcos and take Malacañang Palace by force. However, this RAM coup d'état failed when it was discovered by Marcos on February 22, 1986 - a day before it was supposed to be implemented.

=== People Power Revolution ===
Trapped in Camp Aguinaldo, Enrile sought the support of Philippine Constabulary chief Fidel V. Ramos in Camp Crame, who decided to side with Enrile against Marcos. This still left Enrile and Ramos' forces trapped in the camps, however, and the two sought assistance from Roman Catholic Cardinal Jaime Sin.

Cardinal Sin called on private citizens, already planning protests connected to cheating during the elections, to help protect Enrile and Ramos' forces by forming a human barricade on the stretch of EDSA between the two camps. Marcos soon issued military orders to attack Enrile and Ramos' forces while publicly pretending to issue contrary orders, but the crowds of civilians who occupied the streets made it difficult for AFP forces to get close to the camps. Eventually, AFP units and commanders rejected Marcos' orders one by one and began defecting to the Enrile and Ramos faction instead.

The RAM coup had originally intended to put power in the hands of a Military Junta, but the failure of Enrile's plan instead set the stage for the civilian-led People Power Revolution, which would eventually put a democratic government led by Cory Aquino in the place of Marcos.

== Coup attempts during the Aquino Administration ==
The following years remained hostile for the Philippines, a series of bloody coup attempts led by then-Col. Gregorio Honasan of the Reform the Armed Forces Movement, involved thousands of renegade troops, including elite units from the army and marines, in a coordinated series of attacks on Malacanang and several major military camps in Manila and surrounding provinces, including Sangley and Villamor Air Base, using the T-28 aircraft for aerial assaults. President Corazon Aquino found it necessary to request United States support to put down the uprising. As a result, a large U.S. special operations force was formed and named Operation Classic Resolve, as USAF F-4 fighter aircraft stationed at Clark Air Base patrolled above rebel air bases, and two aircraft carriers were positioned off the Philippines. The U.S. operation soon caused the coup to collapse. Additional U.S. forces were then sent to secure the American embassy in Manila. The military uprisings resulted in an estimated US$1.5 billion loss to the Philippine economy.

== Renaming ==
In 1990, RAM cut its ties with the SFP (Soldiers of the Filipino People), and changed its name to Rebolusyonaryong Alyansang Makabansa (Revolutionary Nationalist Alliance).

== Amnesty ==
After the term of Corazon Aquino ended, peace talks with the administration of President Fidel V. Ramos led to the release of Proclamation No. 723 in May 1996, which offered amnesty to members of RAM-SFP-YOU who participated in the coups of the 1980s. Not all the members availed of this, however, and were instead given amnesty at various later dates.

== Olalia-Alay-ay murder case ==
In 2021, Antipolo Regional Trial Court Branch 97 convicted three members of the Reform the Armed Forces Movement for the murder of labor leader Rolando Olalia and union worker Leonor Alay-ay. Former RAM officers Fernando Casanova, Dennis Jabatan, and Desiderio Perez were convicted on two counts of murder and sentenced to up to 40 years imprisonment, without eligibility for parole. However, ten other accused RAM members were not included in the conviction.

== See also ==
- Armed Forces of the Philippines
- People Power Revolution
- 1989 Philippine coup attempt
- Magdalo (mutineers)
- List of revolutions and rebellions
- Coup d'état
