= Camp Aguinaldo =

Barangay in Quezon City, Metro Manila, Philippines

Camp General Emilio Aguinaldo
- Kampo Heneral Emilio Aguinaldo
- Quezon City, Philippines
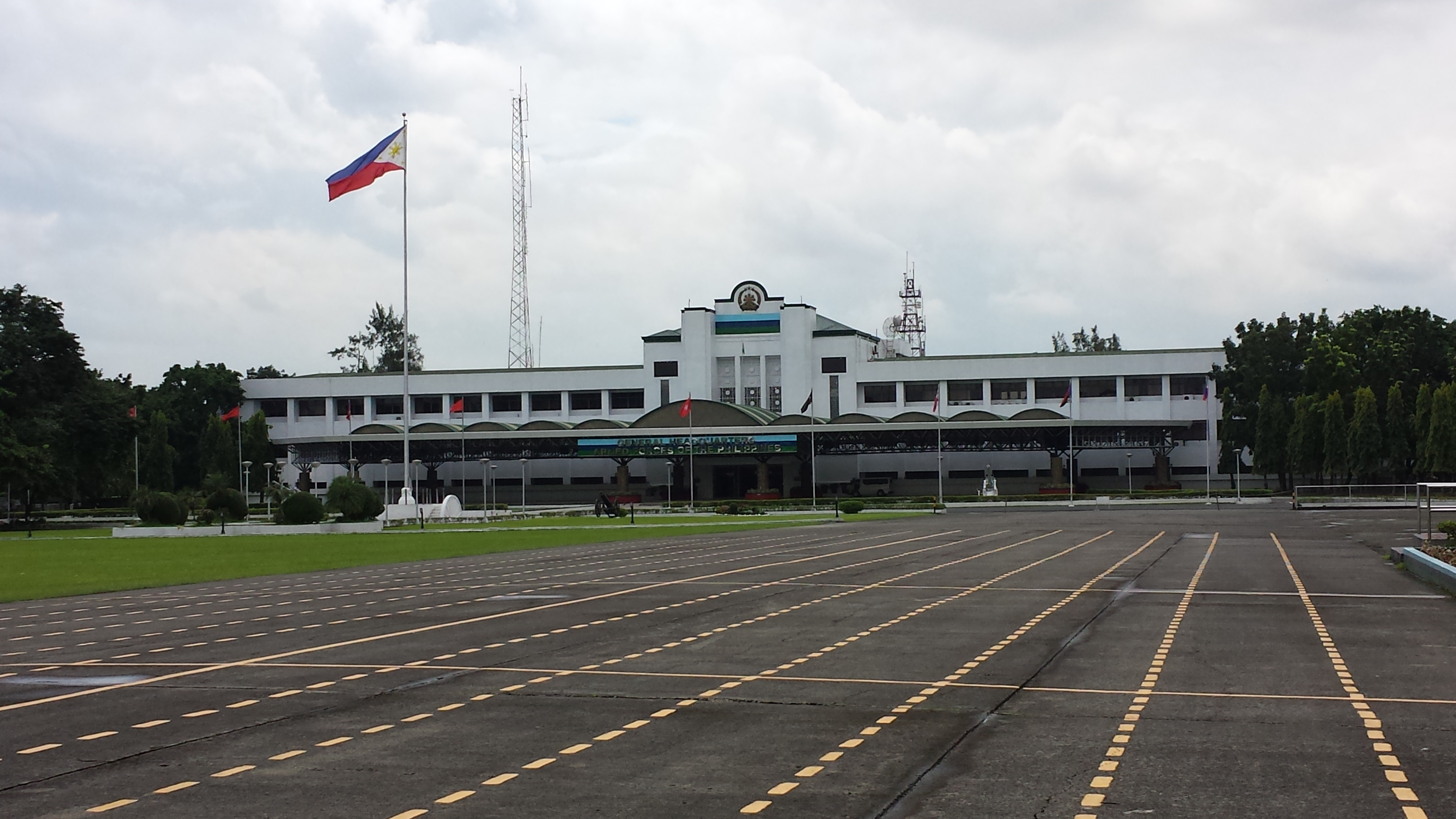
- General Headquarters Building of the AFP at Camp General Emilio Aguinaldo, Quezon City.

Site information
- Type: Military base
- Controlled by: Philippines

Site history
- Built: 1935
- In use: 1935–present
- Materials: Concrete and Metal
- Battles/wars: World War II; Korean War; Vietnam War; Gulf War; Iraq War; Operation Enduring Freedom – Philippines

Garrison information
- Current commander: BGen Armand F. Arevalo, PA
- Garrison: Department of National Defense: National Disaster Risk Reduction and Management Council; Philippine Veterans Affairs Office; National Defense College of the Philippines; AFP General Headquarters & Headquarters Service Command; NCR Command/ Joint Task Force NCR; AFP Reserve Command; AFP Command & General Staff College; AFP Joint Special Operations Group; AFP Peacekeeping Operations Center

Camp General Emilio Aguinaldo (CGEA; formerly Camp Murphy), also known as Camp Aguinaldo, is the site of the general headquarters (GHQ) of the Armed Forces of the Philippines (AFP).

It is located in Quezon City along EDSA, a major thoroughfare of the metropolis, to which it is across Camp Crame, the national headquarters (NHQ) of the Philippine National Police (PNP). The military installation is named after Philippine revolutionary leader Emilio Aguinaldo, who became the first Philippine president and fought in the Philippine Revolution, the Spanish–American War, and the Philippine–American War.

== Land ==
The combined areas of both Camp Aguinaldo and Camp Crame covers a total land area of 220 hectares (2.2 km^{2}), with 34 hectares (0.34 km^{2}) being part of a deed of donation from the Ortigas and Company Partnership Limited in the 1950s. The company had originally acquired these lands as estate holdings from the Augustinian Order, such as the Hacienda de Mandaluyon.

Camp Aguinaldo occupies 178.7 hectares (1.787 km^{2}) of this total area, of which 152.5 hectares (1.525 km^{2}) hectares were purchased by the government and the remaining 26.2 hectares (0.262 km^{2}) hectares were donated by Ortigas and Company.

== History ==
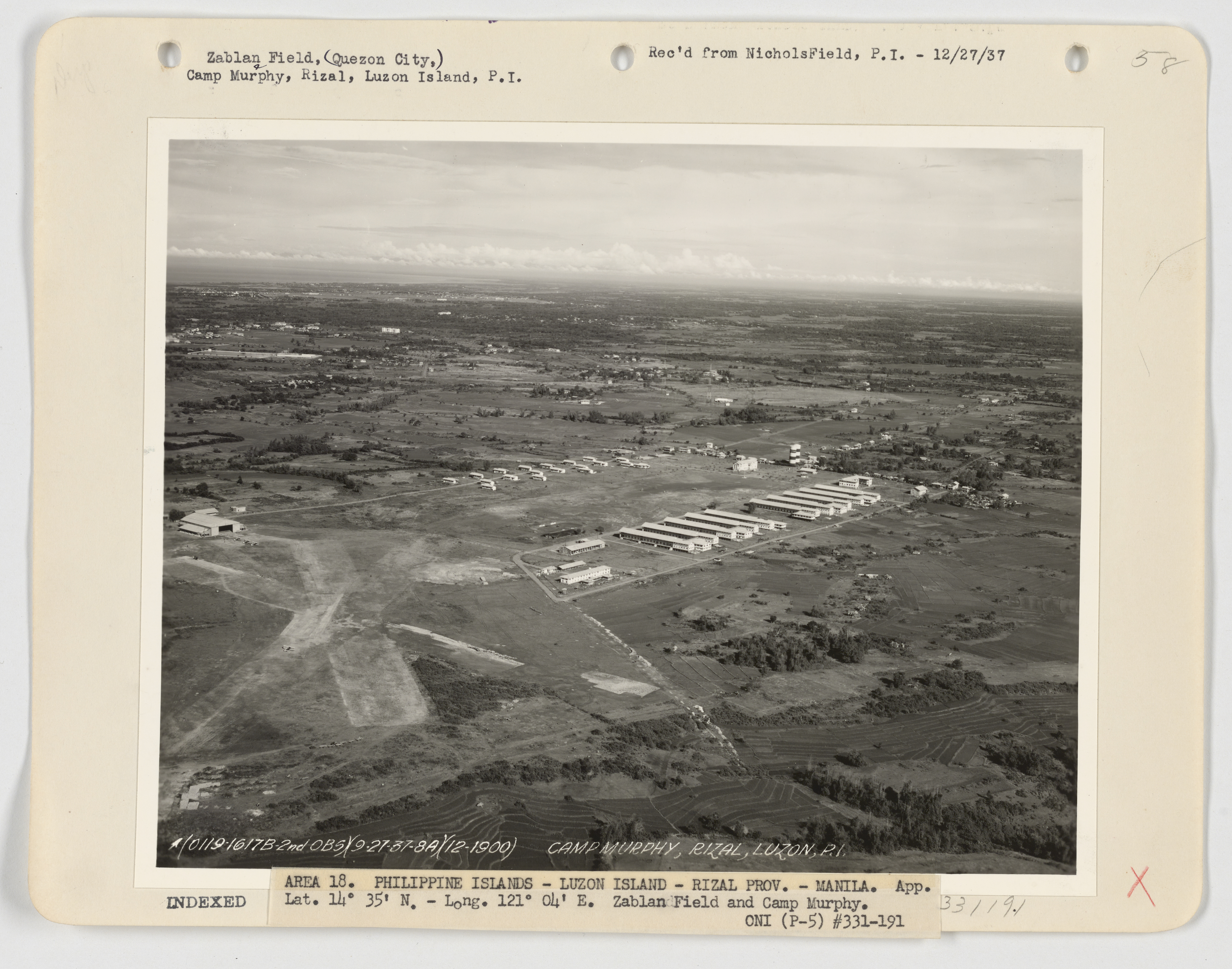
Aerial view of Camp Murphy and Zablan Field, 1937

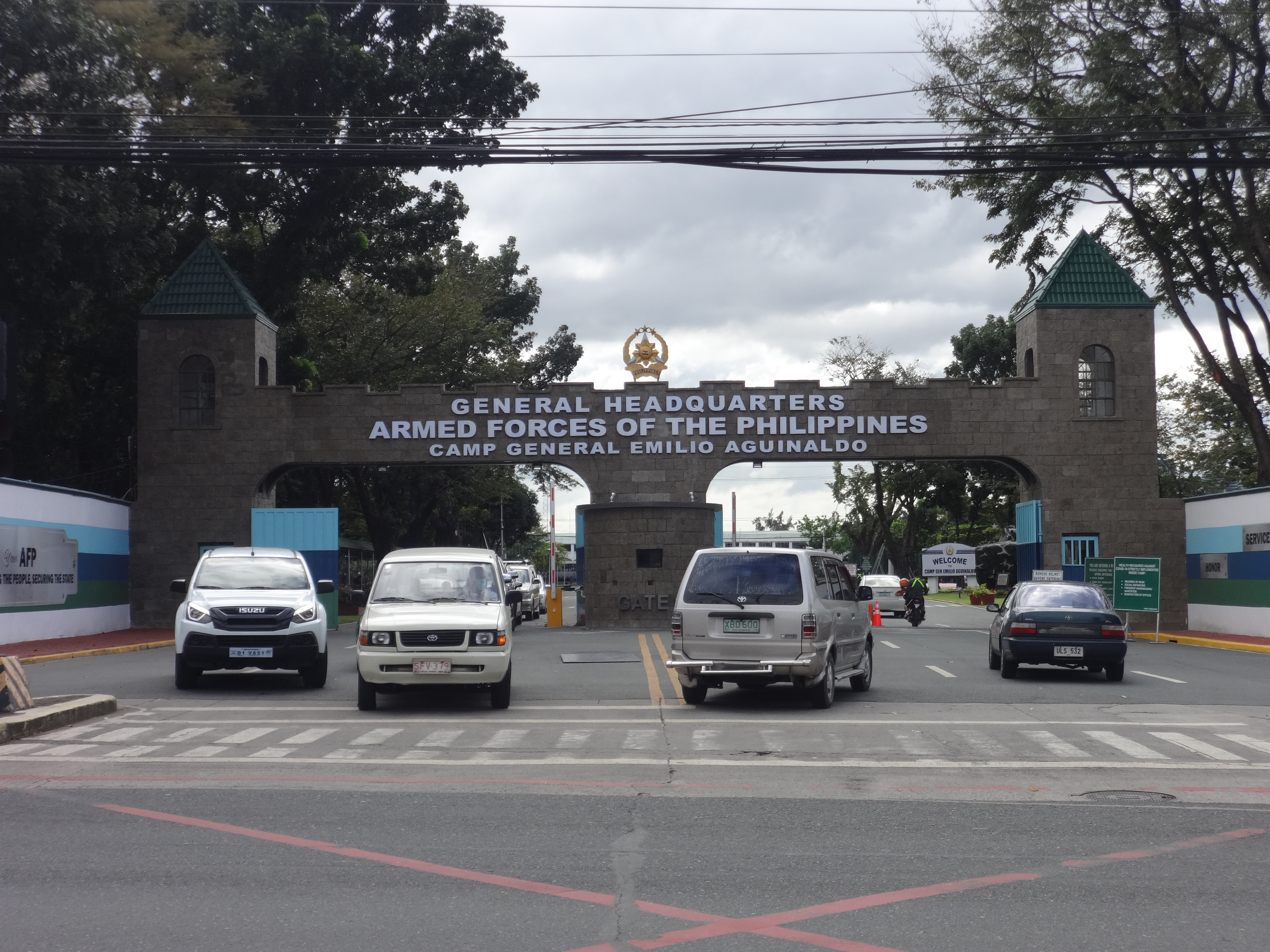
Gate of Camp Aguinaldo.

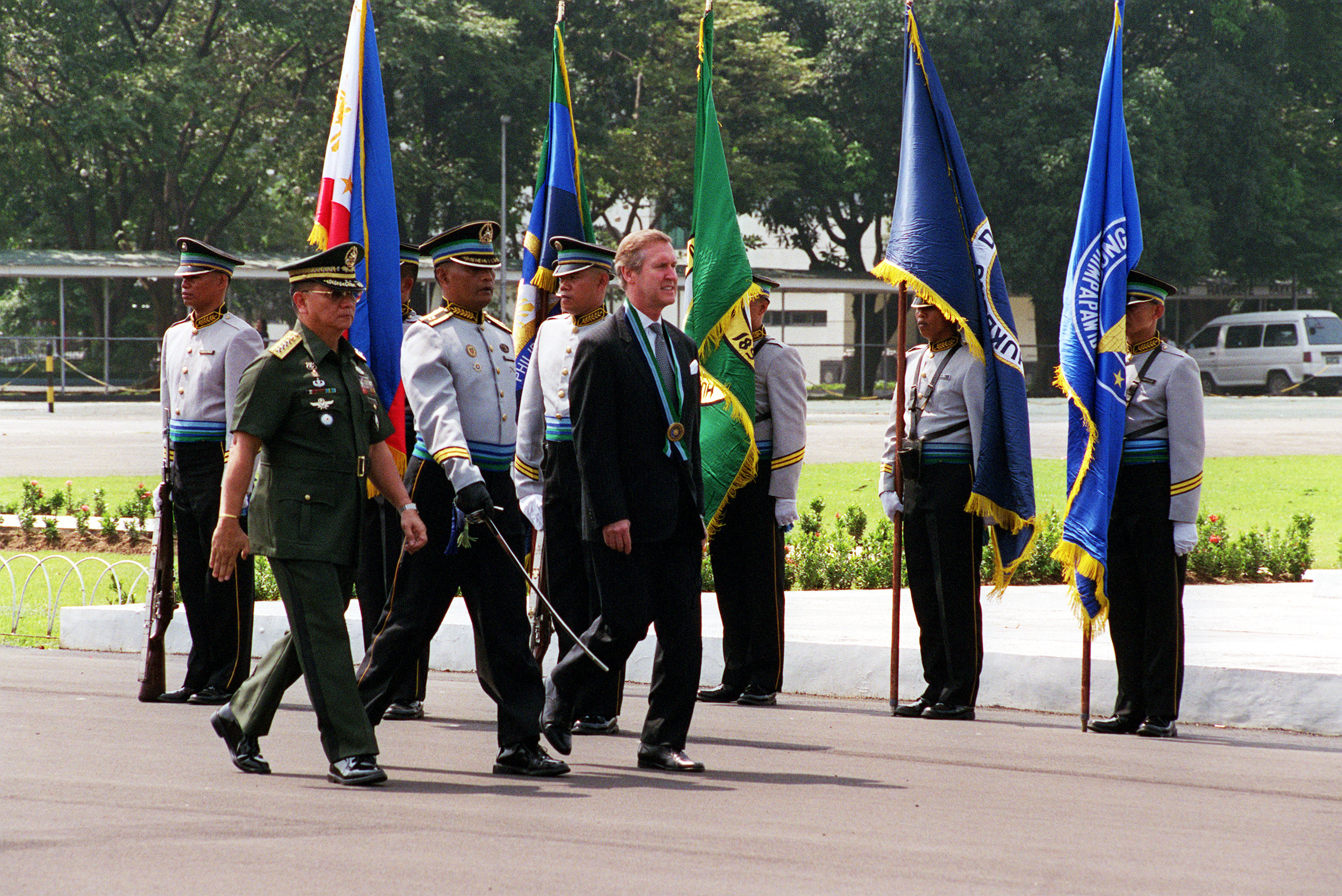
GHQ Security Escort Battalion render honors for United States Secretary of Defense William Cohen at the Camp Aguinaldo Grandstand and Parade Ground.

Camp Aguinaldo was established on January 11, 1935, as Camp Murphy, including Zablan Field, which acted as an airstrip. It was then part of San Juan, Rizal. It was named in honor of the first American High Commissioner to the Philippines Frank Murphy. It was renamed Camp General Emilio Aguinaldo in 1965, after the first president of the Philippines. The Philippine Constabulary General Service Battalion was the first to use the camp in January 1935. In December of that year, the National Defense Act paved the way for the formation of the Philippine Army. It also designated the Philippine Constabulary as the Army Constabulary Division, which maintains its peacekeeping mission under the DND.

In June 1938, the Army Constabulary Division was separated from the Philippine Army and was reformed to become the National Police Force under the Department of Interior.

After World War II, Camp Murphy was divided into two camps—Camp Crame and Camp Aguinaldo. The Zablan Field's former Japanese runways now forms the roads of White Plains Avenue and a portion of Katipunan Avenue, just in front of White Plains subdivisions. The camp was transferred to the jurisdiction of Quezon City in 1941, and briefly became part of the City of Greater Manila, resulting from Quezon City's merger with Manila and several Rizal towns, from 1942 to 1945.

During the EDSA Revolution in February 1986, Camp Aguinaldo, along with Camp Crame, were targeted by the Reform the Armed Forces Movement (RAM) - a cabal of disgruntled officers of the Armed Forces of the Philippines (AFP) led by RAM founder Col. Gringo Honasan as key strategic facilities to restrict counteroffensive from Marcos-loyal troops as a part of a coup attempt against Ferdinand and Imelda Marcos, however the coup was quickly uncovered and was ultimately aborted.

On November 21, 2013, Civic Groups and Volunteers were to be transferred to Camp Emilio Aguinaldo from Villamor Air Base in Pasay. It was done to give more storage spaces for those who were part of Oplan Salubong. All relief supports including food, medical and transportation services were to be transferred to Camp Aguinaldo together with the DSWD in the benefit of Typhoon Yolanda survivors.

In March 2019, the DOTr announced that the Katipunan station of the Metro Manila Subway is planned to be built underneath a portion of the camp's property, along the intersection of Katipunan Avenue and Col. Bonny Serrano Avenue, in order to boost property values in the area and generate investments for the government .

== Barangay ==
Camp Aguinaldo
- Barangay
- Location within Metro Manila
- Coordinates: 14.6061°N 121.0650°E
- Country: Philippines
- Region: National Capital Region
- City: Quezon City
- District: 3rd District
- Established: June 25, 1975

Government
  - Type: Barangay
  - Barangay captain: Gregorio R. Tolentino

Area
  - Total: 1.83 km^{2} (0.71 sq mi)

Population (2020)
  - Total: 3,269
  - Density: 1,790/km^{2} (4,630/sq mi)
- Time zone: UTC+8 (PST)
- Postal Code: 1110
- Area code: 2
- PSGC: 137404019

The military installation is situated in its own administrative division as a barangay of Quezon City, known as Barangay Camp Aguinaldo. Prior to this, Camp Aguinaldo was part of Barangay Socorro until the namesake barangay was created through Executive Order No. 29 signed by Mayor Norberto S. Amoranto on June 25, 1975. At the time of creation, the barangay had 250 households and a voting population of 800 people.

The land boundaries of Barangay Camp Aguinaldo are defined by Boni Serrano Avenue (formerly known as Santolan Road) to the north, EDSA to the west, White Plains Avenue to the south, and the eastern perimeter of the base to the east. Some non-military establishments can be found near the northern boundary with Barangay Socorro along Boni Serrano Avenue, such as the Saint Ignatius de Loyola Parish Church and the Camp General Emilio Aguinaldo High School.

Its barangay hall can be located at the intersection of Road 3 and Gozar Street.

== See also ==
- Philippine Constabulary
- Philippine Military Academy
- Military history of the Philippines
- Military history of the Philippines during World War II
