= Proclamation No. 1081 =

1972 declaration of martial law by Philippine President Ferdinand Marcos

Ferdinand Marcos
- Long title: Proclaiming a State of Martial Law in the Philippines
- Territorial extent: Philippines
- Enacted by: Ferdinand Marcos
- Signed: September 21, 1972
- Commenced: September 23, 1972

Keywords
- politics, martial law
- Status: Repealed

Proclamation No. 1081 was the document which contained formal proclamation of martial law in the Philippines by President Ferdinand Marcos, as announced to the public on September 23, 1972.

The proclamation marked the onset of a 14-year period of authoritarian rule, which would include eight years of Martial Law (de jure ending on January 17, 1981, through Proclamation No. 2045), but not de facto: followed by five more years where Marcos retained essentially all of his powers as dictator.

Marcos was eventually ousted on February 25, 1986, as a result of the EDSA People Power Revolution.

== Reasons ==
Numerous explanations have been put forward as reasons for Marcos to declare martial law in September 1972, some of which were presented by the Marcos administration as official justifications, and some of which were dissenting perspectives put forward by either the mainstream political opposition or by analysts studying the political economy of the decision.

=== Official justifications ===
In his 1987 treatise, "Dictatorship & Martial Law: Philippine Authoritarianism in 1972", University of the Philippines Public Administration Professor Alex Brillantes Jr. identifies three reasons expressed by the Marcos administration, saying that martial law:

1. was a response to various leftist and rightist plots against the Marcos administration;
2. was just the consequence of political decay after American-style democracy failed to take root in Philippine society; and
3. was a reflection of Filipino society's history of authoritarianism and supposed need for iron-fisted leadership.

The first two justifications were explicitly stated in the proclamation, which cited two explicit justifications: "to save the republic" (from various plots); and "to reform society" (after the failure of American-style democracy). The third rationalization arose from the administration's propaganda, which portrayed Ferdinand Marcos as a hypermasculine figure able to compel the obedience of supposedly "spoiled" Filipinos.

==== Incidents cited ====
1972 bombing incidents cited in Proclamation No. 1081
Date	Place
March 15	Arca Building on Taft Avenue, Pasay, Rizal
April 23	Filipinas Orient Airways boardroom along Domestic Road, Pasay, Rizal
May 30	Vietnamese Embassy on Calle Connor (Vito Cruz Street), Manila
June 23	Court of Industrial Relations
June 24	Philippine Trust Company branch in Cubao, Quezon City
July 3	Philam Life building along United Nations Avenue, Manila
July 27	Tabacalera Cigar & Cigarette Factory (Compañía-General de Tabacos de Filipinas) compound at Calle Marqués de Comillas, Manila
August 15	PLDT exchange office on East Avenue, Quezon City
August 15	Philippine Sugar Institute building on North Avenue, Diliman, Quezon City
August 17	Department of Social Welfare building at Calle San Rafael, Sampaloc, Manila
August 19	A water main on Aurora Boulevard and Madison Avenue, Quezon City
August 30	Philam Life building and nearby Far East Bank and Trust Company building
August 30	Building of the Philippine Banking Corporation as well as the buildings of the Investment Development Inc., and the Daily Star Publications when another explosion took place on Railroad Street, Port Area, Manila
September 5	Joe's Department Store on Calle Carriedo, Quiapo, Manila
September 8	Manila City Hall
September 12	Water mains in San Juan, Rizal
September 14	Cerveza San Miguel building in Makati, Rizal
September 18	Quezon City Hall

=== Dissenting perspectives ===
==== Dissenting perspectives from the political mainstream ====
Opposition to Marcos' declaration of martial law ran the whole gamut of Philippine society - ranging from impoverished peasants whom the administration tried to chase out of their homes; to the Philippines' political old-guard, whom Marcos had tried to displace from power; to academics and economists who disagreed with the specifics of Marcos' martial law policies. All of these, regardless of their social position or policy beliefs, subscribed to the interpretation that Marcos declared martial law:

1. as a strategy to enable Ferdinand Marcos to stay in power past the two Presidential terms allowed for him under Philippine Constitution of 1935
2. as a technique for covering up the already amassed, and would-be still amassed, ill-gotten wealth of Marcos, his family, and his cronies.

==== Dissenting economic interpretations ====
In addition, some critics ascribe an economic component to Marcos' motivations, suggesting that martial law:

1. was an acquiescence to the global market system, which required tight control of sociopolitical systems so that the country's resources could be exploited efficiently;
2. was a product of the infighting among the families that formed the upper socioeconomic class of Philippine society; and
3. was a connivance between the state powers and the upper-class families to keep the members of the country's lower classes from becoming too powerful.

== Background ==
Philippine Military Academy instructor Lt. Victor Corpuz led New People's Army rebels in a raid on the PMA armory, capturing rifles, machine guns, grenade launchers, a bazooka and thousands of rounds of ammunition in 1970. In 1972, China, which was then actively supporting and arming communist insurgencies in Asia as part of Mao Zedong's People's War Doctrine, smuggled 1,200 M-14 and AK-47 rifles aboard the MV Karagatan for the NPA to speed up NPA's campaign to defeat the government. Prior to 1975, the Philippine government maintained a close relationship with the Kuomintang-ruled Chinese government which fled to Taiwan (Republic of China), despite the Chinese communist victory in 1949, and saw the People's Republic of China as a security threat due to its financial and military support of communist rebels in the country.

Citing an intensifying communist insurgency, a series of bombings, and the staged fake assassination attempt on then-Defense Minister Juan Ponce Enrile, President Marcos enacted the proclamation which enabled him to rule by military power. It was later revealed that on September 22, 1972, at 8:00 p.m., exactly a day after Marcos signed Proclamation No. 1081, Enrile exited his car beside an electrical post near Wack-Wack village, on the way to Enrile's exclusive subdivision of Dasmariñas Village. Another car stopped beside it and gunmen exited the vehicle and immediately fired bullets at Enrile's car. This was the basis for Marcos's September 23 televised announcement of martial law at 7:15 p.m.

== Preparation of the document ==
While some historians believe Marcos' logistical and political preparations for proclaiming Martial Law began as early as 1965, when he took up the Defense Secretary portfolio for himself in an effort to curry the loyalty of the armed forces hierarchy, the preparation for the actual document which became Proclamation 1081 began in December 1969, in the wake of Marcos' expensive 1969 presidential reelection bid. Marcos approached at least two different factions within his cabinet to study how the implementation of martial law should be structured in the proclamation.

=== Melchor and Almonte study ===
Some time in December 1969, Marcos asked Executive Secretary Alejandro Melchor and Melchor's aide-de-camp at the time, Major Jose Almonte, to study the different ways Martial Law had been implemented throughout the world, and the repercussions that might come from declaring it in the Philippines. The study submitted by Melchor and Almonte said that "while Martial Law may accelerate development, in the end the Philippines would become a political archipelago, with debilitating, factionalized politics."

In Almonte, who would eventually become head of the head of the National Intelligence Coordinating Agency under President Corazon Aquino and later National Security Advisor to her successor, President Fidel Ramos, recalled in a 2015 memoir that he felt "the nation would be destroyed because, apart from the divisiveness it would cause, Martial Law would offer Marcos absolute power which would corrupt absolutely."

=== Enrile study and draft of proclamation documents ===
Marcos, who kept up a strategy of keeping cabinet members from becoming too powerful by giving different factions different facts and redundant orders, also gave a similar task to Justice Secretary Juan Ponce Enrile that December. This time, he specifically asked what powers the 1935 Constitution would grant the President upon the declaration of Martial Law. According to Enrile's 2012 memoir, Marcos emphasized that "the study must be done discreetly and confidentially." With help from Efren Plana and Minerva Gonzaga Reyes, Enrile submitted the only copy of his confidential report to Marcos in January 1970.

A week after Enrile submitted his study, Marcos asked him to prepare the needed documents for implementing Martial Law in the Philippines.

== Signing of Proclamation No. 1081 ==
Several conflicting accounts exist regarding the exact date on which Marcos signed the physical Proclamation No. 1081 document. Differing accounts suggest that Marcos signed the document as early as September 10, 1972, or as late as September 25, 1972, regardless Marcos formally listed September 21 as the day of the formalization of Proclamation No. 1081.

As early as September 13, 1972, Sen. Benigno "Ninoy" Aquino broke the news of a secret plan called "Oplan Sagittarius", which would declare martial law and was as widely condemned by Filipinos as the ongoing Watergate scandal in the United States. He would later have a speech on September 21, 1972, in front of the Senate to recount the true role of the Congress. The congress would decide to have a sine die adjournment, or a final session on September 23, 1972. Later that afternoon, a large rally attended by 50,000 people at Plaza Miranda denounced Oplan Sagittarius and was held by the Movement of Concerned Citizens for Civil Liberties (MCCCL), headed by Sen. Jose W. Diokno, who left the Nacionalista Party, the political party of Marcos to rally against the controversial decisions of the administration. This was the largest rally out of a series of protests from the previous year, due to many scandals by Pres. Marcos beginning with the Jabidah Massacre in 1968 and the 1969 elections, considered by experts to be the "dirtiest election in (Philippine) history." Proclamation No. 1081 was formally dated September 21 according to historians because of these events as well as Marcos's superstition and numerological belief concerning multiples of the lucky number seven. The Official Gazette of the republic of the Philippines, in a retrospective article on Marcos' proclamation of Martial Law, comments on the differences in the accounts:

"Whether they conflict or not, all accounts indicate that Marcos’ obsession with numerology (particularly the number seven) necessitated that Proclamation No. 1081 be officially signed on a date that was divisible by seven. Thus, September 21, 1972 became the official date that Martial Law was established and the day that the Marcos dictatorship began. This also allowed Marcos to control history on his own terms."

== Announcement of Martial Law ==
Reports from the Roberto Benedicto-owned Daily Express of Sen. Aquino declaring that he must be arrested by the president or he would escape to join the resistance surfaced on September 22, 1972. The staged assassination of Defense Minister Enrile and other men were held later that evening at 8:00 p.m. Finally by the morning of September 23, 1972, Martial Law forces had successfully implemented a media lockdown, with only outlets associated with Marcos crony Roberto Benedicto allowed to operate. In the afternoon, the Benedicto-owned television channel KBS-9 went back on air playing episodes of Hanna-Barbera's Wacky Races cartoon series, which was interrupted at 3:00 PM when Press Secretary Francisco Tatad went on air to read Proclamation No. 1081, through which Marcos declared Martial Law. Ferdinand Marcos himself made an appearance at his mansion, Malacañang Palace, at 7:15 p.m. that evening to formalize the announcement. The following morning, September 24, the headline of the Daily Express announced "FM Declares Martial Law" – the only newspaper to come out in the immediate aftermath of the Martial Law declaration.

== Implementation of Martial Law ==
Marcos would declare September 21, 1972, as "National Thanksgiving Day", to erase the events of the MCCCL rally led by Sen. Diokno and the senate hearings presided by Sen. Aquino, which inadvertently created a whiplash effect of confusion as to the date of Marcos's television announcement, which was two days later on September 23. Martial law was ratified by 90.77% of the voters during the controversial 1973 Philippine Martial Law referendum.

After the constitution was approved by 95% of the voters in the Philippine constitutional plebiscite, the 1935 Constitution was replaced with a new one that changed the system of government from a presidential to a parliamentary one, with Marcos remaining in power as both head of state (with the title "President") and head of government (titled "Prime Minister"). Under the new government, President Marcos formed his political coalition—the Kilusang Bagong Lipunan (KBL; English: New Society Movement)—to control the unicameral legislature he created, known as the Batasang Pambansa.

In an effort to isolate the local communist movement, President Marcos went to China in 1975 to normalize diplomatic relations. In return for recognizing the People's Republic of China as the legitimate government of China, and that Taiwan is part of Chinese territory, Chinese Premier Zhou Enlai pledged to stop supporting the Philippine communist rebels.

The government subsequently captured NPA leaders Bernabe Buscayno in 1976 and Jose Maria Sison in 1977. The Washington Post, in an interview with former Philippine Communist Party officials, revealed that, "they (local communist party officials) wound up languishing in China for 10 years as unwilling 'guests' of the (Chinese) government, feuding bitterly among themselves and with the party leadership in the Philippines".

== Formal lifting ==
President Marcos formally lifted Martial Law on January 17, 1981, several weeks before the first pastoral visit of Pope John Paul II to the Philippines for the beatification of Lorenzo Ruiz. After the termination of Martial Law, the CPP-NPA was able to return to urban areas and form relationships with legal opposition organizations, and began increasingly successful attacks against the government throughout the country. Regardless, experts concluded that the dictatorship was still in effect despite the formal announcement, until the Philippine Church led by Jaime Sin and the Filipino Citizens' organized EDSA Revolution of 1986 forced the Marcoses out of Malacañang Palace.

== General orders ==
General Order № 1 - The President proclaimed that he shall direct the entire government, including all its agencies and instrumentalities, and exercise all powers of his office including his role as the Commander-in-Chief of the Armed Forces of the Philippines.

General Order № 2 – The President directed the Minister of National Defense to arrest or cause the arrest and take into his custody the individuals named in the attached list and to hold them until otherwise so ordered by the President or by his duly designated representative, as well as to arrest or cause the arrest and take into his custody and to hold them otherwise ordered released by him or by his duly authorized representative such persons who may have committed crimes described in the Order.

General Order № 3 – The President ordered that all executive departments, bureaus, offices, agencies and instrumentalities of the National Government, government owned or controlled corporations, as well all governments of all the provinces, cities, municipalities and barrios should continue to function under their present officers and employees, until otherwise ordered by the President or by his duly designated representatives. The President further ordered that the Judiciary should continue to function in accordance with its present organization and personnel, and should try to decide in accordance with existing laws all criminal and civil cases, except certain cases enumerated in the Order.

General Order № 4 – The President ordered that a curfew be maintained and enforced throughout the Philippines from twelve o’clock midnight until four o’clock in the morning.

General Order № 5 – All rallies, demonstrations and other forms of group actions including strikes and picketing in vital industries such as in companies engaged in manufacture or processing as well as in production or processing of essential commodities or products for exports, and in companies engaged in banking of any kind, as well as in hospitals and in schools and colleges are prohibited.

General Order № 6 – No person shall keep, possess or carry outside of his residence any firearm unless such person is duly authorized to keep, possess or carry any such firearm except to those who are being sent abroad in the service of the Philippines.

== See also ==
- Martial law in the Philippines
- Martial law under Ferdinand Marcos
- September 11 attacks
- 2007 Venezuelan RCTV protests
- Shutdown of ABS-CBN broadcasting
- Proclamation No. 216
- October Restoration
- Plaza Miranda bombing
- Ninoy Aquino
- 1978 Philippine parliamentary election
- Dekada '70 (novel)
- Dekada '70, the film adaptation of above
