= Isidro Rodriguez (politician) =

Filipino lawyer and politician

Isidro S. Rodriguez Sr.
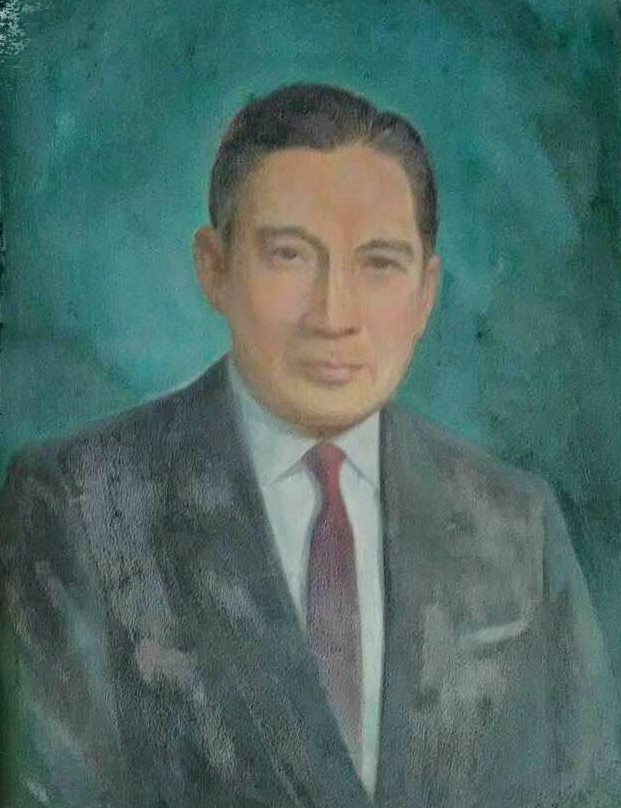

16th Governor of Rizal
- In office December 30, 1955 – March 25, 1986
- Vice Governor: None (1955–1959); Amado C. Gervacio (1959–1963); Mario Bauza (1963–1967); Neptali Gonzales (1967–1969); Ruperto C. Gaite (1969–1971); Arsenio Roldan Jr. (1971–1975); Vacant (1975–1980); Jose C. Hernandez (1980–1986)
- Preceded by: Wenceslao Pascual
- Succeeded by: Benjamin Esguerra Sr.

President of the Amateur Softball Association of the Philippines
- In office 1969–1983

Personal details
- Born: Isidro Santiago Rodriguez; May 15, 1915 Montalban, Rizal, Philippine Islands
- Died: March 9, 1992 (aged 76) Quezon City, Metro Manila, Philippines
- Party: NPC (1991–1992)
- Other political affiliations: Nacionalista (1955–1991)
- Spouse: Adelina Santos-Rodriguez (m. 1941)
- Children: 11
- Parents: Eulogio A. Rodriguez Sr. (father); Juana Santiago-Rodriguez (mother)
- Education: University of the Philippines College of Law

Isidro Santiago Rodriguez, Sr. (May 15, 1915 – March 9, 1992) was a Filipino lawyer and politician who served as the provincial governor of Rizal from 1955 to 1986. Rodriguez was the first vice president of the International Softball Federation (ISF) and an ISF Hall of Fame inductee. He is the son of Eulogio "Amang" A. Rodriguez Sr., former Senate President of the Philippines, and Juana Santiago-Rodriguez.

In July 1986, Rodriguez participated in a coup attempt against the Aquino administration at the Manila Hotel.

== Early life and education ==
Rodriguez was the son of senator Eulogio A. Rodriguez, Sr..

Rodriguez obtained his law degree from the University of the Philippines.

== Softball ==
Rodriguez is dubbed as the "Father of Softball in the Philippines" by many softball enthusiasts in the country. He was president of the Amateur Softball Association of the Philippines from 1969 to 1983. He served as first vice president of the ISF. He has also organized the ASEAN Softball Federation in 1975. Rodriguez was inducted in the ISF Hall of Fame in 1983.

== Political career ==
=== Governor of Rizal ===
From 1955 to 1986, Rodriguez served as the provincial governor of Rizal; he never lost an election. In 1963, he was reelected in a landslide against former Agriculture Secretary Benjamin Gozon.

In the 1960s, Rodriguez oversaw the building of Rodriguez Sports Center (now Marikina Sports Center), which was named after him. He is cited for establishing the Manggahan Floodway in the 1980s and Parañaque spillway which alleviated flooding problem in Metro Manila. He was also instrumental in conceiving the Laguna Lake Developmental Plan which calls for sustainable development in the Laguna de Bay area and was supported by both the national government and the United Nations. He also developed healthcare in his constituent province and set up health and puericulture centers in Rizal, including the first provincial blood bank in the country. Rodriguez also conceptualized first Youth Development Program through the Rizal Youth Development Foundation. The youth program later served as a basis for the Kabataang Barangay or the National Development Youth Program.

Rodriguez served for four consecutive terms both at the League of Provincial Governors and League of City Mayors of the Philippines. He served as the first chair of the Pambansang Kapulungan ng mga Sangguniang Bayan (Assembly of the National Board). He was also appointed as the chair of the Constitutional Convention committee on power functions and structures during the 1971 Constitution.

=== Participation in 1986 coup attempt and final years ===
In July 1986, five months after the People Power Revolution overthrew President Ferdinand Marcos and resulted in Rodriguez's removal as Rizal governor, Rodriguez and his wife Adelina participated in a coup attempt led by Arturo Tolentino against the administration of President Corazon Aquino, in which soldiers briefly occupied the Manila Hotel. At the hotel, Rodriguez was named as Tolentino's "local government minister".

In February 1987, Rodriguez partnered with Tolentino and former senator Lorenzo Teves in forming a splinter group of the newly-revived Nacionalista Party, which by then had already splintered into two separate groups led by Rene Cayetano (Roy wing) and Salvador Laurel (Laurel wing). As late as October 1991, meetings among Nacionalista members were held at Rodriguez's residence in Mandaluyong.

Rodriguez was also the first chair of the Nationalist People's Coalition in 1992, but died soon after its establishment.

== Personal life ==
In 1941, he married future mayor of Quezon City, Adelina G. Santos-Rodriguez and they had 10 children including Isidro Jr. and Adelina. He also had one daughter with his former partner Muzowa Lokeko Tiuo from the Democratic Republic of the Congo.

Isidro Jr. or Jun is a former member of Philippine House of Representatives representing the second district of Rizal from 1998-2007 and again from 2010-2019 and Adelina Rodriguez Zaldarriaga or Deline also served as House member from the same district from 2007 to 2010.

== Death ==
Rodriguez died due to heart failure while being confined at the National Kidney and Transplant Institute on March 9, 1992.
