= Romulo Kintanar =

Filipino rebel (1952–2003)

- Born: 1952
- Died: January 23, 2003 (aged 50–51) Quezon City, Philippines
- Allegiance: New People's Army
- Service years: 1970-1992
- Conflicts: New People's Army rebellion

Romulo Kintanar (1952 – January 23, 2003) was a Filipino political dissident and rebel leader who became commander of the New People's Army (NPA), the armed wing of the Communist Party of the Philippines (CPP) in the 1980s. Under his leadership, the NPA adopted a more aggressive approach in its rebellion against the Philippine government, including the assassination of police and military personnel using hit squads and offensive actions in urban areas. His strategies caused differences within the CPP, and following the party's split in 1992, Kintanar was expelled from the CPP after being accused of treason by its chairman, Jose Maria Sison. He rejoined civilian life and worked in various positions in the Philippine government before being assassinated by an NPA hit squad in 2003.

== Personal life ==
Kintanar originated from Davao City and was among seven siblings of a landed family. His father, Florentino Kintanar, was a lawyer from Argao, Cebu who migrated with his wife Rita to Kidapawan, Cotabato in the 1950s. Romulo was a cousin of Cebu City councilor Vicente Kintanar. He was also a nephew of Cebu congressman Simeon Kintanar and Brigadier General Galileo Kintanar, a former head of the Intelligence Service of the Armed Forces of the Philippines (ISAFP).

Kintanar married twice. He had two sons with Ester Resanay, a Catholic social worker, martial law dissident and Mindanao State University faculty member from Iligan who died in the sinking of the M/V Doña Cassandra in 1983. In 1987, he married Gloria "Joy" Jopson (née Asuncion), an activist and widow of dissident Edgar Jopson who became finance secretary of the Communist Party of the Philippines. He had a son with her, in addition to Joy's three children by Edgar.

== NPA leader ==
In 1970, Kintanar joined the New People's Army at the age of 18 when he was still a freshman at the Ateneo de Davao. He persuaded his parents to redistribute 100 ha (250 acres) of their land in Davao and South Cotabato to their farmer-tenants.

As a political officer in the NPA, one of his first engagements in the insurgency was the MV Karagatan incident in 1972, where he was tasked to lead a group of rebels to Palanan, Isabela to receive a clandestine shipment of weapons from China. However, they were discovered and foiled by the military, leaving Kintanar among the few survivors. He became friends with the local NPA commander, Victor Corpus, who later defected and became ISAFP chief.

Kintanar later became active in Mindanao, where he participated in more than 100 battles and carried out raids against military targets, including one that enabled NPA rebels in Mindanao to gain their first armalite rifles. In the late 1970s, Kintanar became part of the CPP's Mindanao Regional Party Committee (MRPC), as its military chief. In 1981, the CPP Central Committee elevated the MRPC into the Mindanao Commission, with Kintanar heading its military secretariat.

In 1984, Kintanar was promoted as chief of the NPA General Command (GC), during which he oversaw the movement's escalation of raids and ambushes and its expansion to include 25,000 members, 33 guerrilla companies and six battalions nationwide by 1987. The NPA-GC was formed by the CPP Central Committee as part of its efforts to professionalize the insurgent structure to prepare for raising the level of armed confrontations with the Armed Forces of the Philippines (AFP). Kintanar reported directly to the CPP Central Committee's Executive Committee and its Political Bureau (Politburo) as chief of the NPA-GC.

Kintanar was also deemed the architect of the NPA's urban guerrilla campaign in the 1980s, in which he created urban hit squads which became popular as the "sparrows", from the acronym of Special Partisan Units (SPARU), that carried out attacks on police and military personnel beginning in Davao City and expanded them to Metro Manila and other urban areas. The Alex Boncayao Brigade (ABB) active in Metro Manila became the most prominent of these "sparrow" units. In 1989, Kintanar claimed responsibility for the killing of US military attaché James N. Rowe in Quezon City on April 21, accusing him of being a "direct participant" in President Corazon Aquino's counter-insurgency campaign.

As NPA-GC Chief, Kintanar approved the forming of working relations with the Japanese Red Army (JRA) in April 1986. The alliance with the JRA by the NPA-GC facilitated the deployment of NPA-GC cadre Eddie Quitoriano to various foreign missions in search of international solidarity for the NPA from 1986 to 1990. The NPA-GC formed clandestine connections with the Workers' Party of Korea, Libya's Muammar Gaddafi, the Nicaraguan Sandinistas, and Palestinian armed movements during this period.

Kintanar himself visited Pyongyang in North Korea with a CPP-NPA delegation in October 1986 to help arrange the training of NPA officers in anti-tank, anti-aircraft, and urban warfare. The NPA-GC also arranged the shipment of weapons and armaments from North Korea in July 1987, but the operation failed with the ship turning back before reaching the Philippine coast due to fear of interception.

== Arrests ==
The Philippine government placed a reward of P150,000 ($7,500) for Kintanar's capture. In March 1988, he was arrested in a military raid along with his wife Joy and three other CPP officials in San Juan, Metro Manila. He was detained at Camp Crame but escaped along with Gloria in November while attending a birthday party for one of the prison wardens inside the camp. As a member of the CPP's central committee, a $17,800 reward was issued for Kintanar's recapture. The couple were recaptured in August 1991 at the Makati Medical Center, where he was seeking treatment for high blood pressure.

== Schism and expulsion from the CPP ==
Kintanar became embroiled in disputes within the Communist Party of the Philippines over military tactics. In 1985, he initiated an elaborate plot to seize the Batasang Pambansa Complex in Quezon City and hold the Regular Batasang Pambansa hostage while it was in session to force the release of political prisoners under the regime of President Ferdinand Marcos and trigger his overthrow. Despite having the support of senior CPP leaders, including its founding chair, Jose Maria Sison, the plan was aborted after acting CPP chair Rodolfo Salas rejected the idea, calling it an insurrection that deviated from the CPP's strategy of protracted warfare.

He was also criticized by party leaders for what they called the "premature regularization" of the NPA units and his calls for CPP officers to temporarily leave their urban safehouses to stay with rebel forces in rural areas. Sison also criticized Kintanar's strategy of initiating offensive actions against the military, saying that it exposed the CPP's mass base to undue military pressure, and described his strategy of expanding NPA membership and waging massive attacks in urban areas as "adventurism".

During the split of the CPP in 1992, Kintanar found himself on the "rejectionist" side, in opposition to Sison's "reaffirmists" who supported CPP dogma and blamed recent setbacks on party leaders who veered from his strategy of protracted warfare in the countryside. Kintanar also opposed Sison's call to abolish the ABB and other urban hit squads, and with other leaders, called for a second congress to review the CPP's strategy and tactics. Instead, Sison called him a "traitor, a military agent" and utak-pulbura (lit. 'one with brains of gunpowder'). Kintanar was subsequently expelled from the CPP.

In 1993, an NPA "people's court" tried, convicted and sentenced Kintanar to death for multiple offenses including the embezzlement of P30 million of the CPP's funds and carrying out criminal activities that included forging currency, robbing banks and kidnapping for ransom, including that of Japanese businessman Noboyuki Wakaoji in 1986 and Bombo Radyo Philippines owner Roger Florete in 1989. He was also convicted for instigating other CPP leaders such as Arturo Tabara and Filemon Lagman to break with the party and establish the Revolutionary Proletarian Army (RPA). In 1994, he was placed on the NPA's hitlist.

== Release ==
Kintanar was released from prison in 1992 and went into civilian life. He created cooperatives and employed his former aides in the NPA. During the 1998 Philippine presidential election, he publicly supported Jose de Venecia Jr.'s candidacy. After Joseph Estrada won the presidency, Kintanar became a consultant of National Security Adviser Alexander Aguirre and was also appointed by Estrada as a consultant for the Technical Education and Skills Development Authority. At the same time, he served as a consultant during negotiations between the RPA-ABB and the government that culminated with the signing of a peace agreement between the RPA-ABB and the Estrada administration in December 2000. During the 2001 Philippine House of Representatives elections, he served as an adviser to his uncle Simeon's electoral campaign in Cebu. During the presidency of Gloria Macapagal-Arroyo, he worked as a security consultant for the Bureau of Immigration and for the National Electrification Administration. In between he also worked as a businessman exporting mangoes from Cebu.

In 2002, Kintanar became involved in the investigation into the murder of actress Nida Blanca as one of 27 witnesses presented by the Philippine National Police and the National Bureau of Investigation. In an affidavit, he pointed to Philip Medel as the main suspect in Blanca's murder, saying that Medel had confessed to carrying out the crime during a drinking session, prompting Kintanar to report the matter to Immigration Commissioner Andrea Domingo, who in turn, passed on the information to police, leading to Medel's arrest.

== Assassination ==
On January 23, 2003, Kintanar was meeting with a film producer who wanted to make a biopic of him when he was fatally shot eight times by two gunmen while dining at the Kamameshi House restaurant inside the Quezon Memorial Circle in Quezon City in an attack that also injured two bystanders. His remains were subsequently cremated following a wake that was also attended by President Gloria Macapagal-Arroyo.

=== Responsibility ===
Jose Maria Sison, who was by then living in exile in the Netherlands, denied involvement in Kintanar's death, which he blamed on either Kintanar's involvement in criminal activities or a retaliation by the Central Intelligence Agency and covert US military forces for the Rowe assassination in 1989. He also accused Kintanar of being part of an assassination plot against him that was headed by then-President Estrada and Philippine National Police Chief Panfilo Lacson, and accused the Arroyo administration of using the murder as a pretext to have him deported from the Netherlands. On January 26, 2003, NPA spokesperson Gregorio Rosal issued a statement acknowledging that an NPA "special team" carried out Kintanar's murder, citing the NPA's death sentence against him in 1993 along with subsequent offenses such using his knowledge as an insider for the government's counter-insurgency strategy, the assassination plot against Sison, and involvement in the murder of Nida Blanca. The AFP subsequently accused Sison of personally selecting a certain Leo Velasco to lead the group that killed Kintanar and other dissident communist leaders as part of a hit list.

On May 11, 2006, a suspected hitman was arrested in Norzagaray, Bulacan and subsequently confessed to participating in the murder of Kintanar and Arturo Tabara in 2004. On August 28, 2007, Sison was arrested in Utrecht, the Netherlands on charges of ordering the killings of Kintanar and Tabara. The next day, Kintanar's widow, Joy Jopson, admitted to filing alongside Tabara's widow the case against Sison that led to his arrest. However, Sison was released in September after judges found that there was insufficient evidence to show that he "had a conscious and close co-operation with those in the Philippines who carried out the deed".
