= God Save the Queen Plot =

Failed military overthrow of President Corazon Aquino

| Date | November 11–22, 1986 |
| Location | Metro Manila |
| Result | Philippine government victory: Coup averted; Dismissal of Enrile as Minister of National Defense in the Aquino cabinet, reassignment of Honasan and other coup plotters away from Manila |

Belligerents
| Philippines | Reform the Armed Forces Movement |

Commanders and leaders
| Corazon Aquino; Fidel Ramos | Juan Ponce Enrile; Gregorio Honasan |

Military support
| Armed Forces of the Philippines | RAM Loyalists from the AFP |

The God Save the Queen Plot was a planned coup d’etat in November 1986 by Minister of National Defense Juan Ponce Enrile and the Reform the Armed Forces Movement (RAM), a rebel faction within the Armed Forces of the Philippines (AFP) to overthrow President Corazon Aquino, whom it helped install during the People Power Revolution nine months before. However, the staging of the coup was delayed and ultimately stopped by maneuvers within the AFP led by Chief of Staff General Fidel Ramos before a shot was even fired. As a result, Enrile was fired by Aquino from her cabinet.

The coup, along with another one in July 1987, were the only attempts against Aquino, out of a total of nine, that were uncovered before execution. It also marked the beginning of RAM's break with Aquino, which culminated in the August 1987 Philippine coup attempt against her.

== Background ==
The Reform the Armed Forces Movement (RAM) was a group of dissident soldiers and officers of the AFP that had formed in the latter years of the dictatorship of President Ferdinand Marcos. In 1986, some of these officers, led by Colonel Gringo Honasan and Defense Minister Juan Ponce Enrile launched a failed coup d'état against Marcos and were later joined by AFP Vice Chief of Staff General Fidel Ramos, prompting a large number of civilians to attempt to prevent Marcos from wiping the RAM rebels out. This eventually snowballed into the People Power Revolution of February 1986, which overthrew the Marcos regime and forced his family into exile in the U.S. state of Hawaii, replacing him with his electoral rival, Corazon Aquino.

However, RAM's relations with President Aquino gradually deteriorated, mainly due to its hardline stance on negotiations with her government's conciliatory approach on the communist insurgency, and the presence of supposedly left-wing officials in Aquino's cabinet, namely Joker Arroyo (Executive Secretary), Aquilino Pimentel Jr. (Local Government Minister), Augusto Sanchez (Labor Minister), and Ernesto Maceda (Natural Resources Minister). In addition, the military accused Arroyo, Pimentel and Sanchez of having links to the Communist Party of the Philippines, and Maceda of corruption in his handling of the logging industry.

Enrile, whom Aquino retained as Defense Minister, shared RAM resentment over being sidelined by her after the Revolution. Likewise, Enrile's relations with Aquino further soured due to his public criticism of her supposed betrayal of the Revolution and her approach to the communist insurgency, his inclusion in a Marcos loyalist cabinet presented during the Manila Hotel Siege in July 1986 which he rejected, and the way he had preempted Aquino in giving a blanket amnesty to the soldiers involved in what had been the first coup attempt against her government. The lenient way in which Aquino handled the coup, along with her failure to investigate RAM and Enrile for liaising with Marcos loyalists who had staged the coup, appeared to convince RAM and Enrile that they could launch another move against Aquino with impunity.

At the same time, the Aquino government also grappled with other issues such as drafting a new constitution and renegotiating of billions of dollars in debt accumulated by the Marcos regime.

== Chronology ==
=== Preparations ===
Preparations began for the coup are estimated to have begun in September 1986, when RAM officers unveiled a hybrid warfare plan involving psychological warfare and systematic assassination of prominent left-wing figures and officials in the Aquino cabinet. Their first step was to increase RAM's public visibility, and claim greater emphasis of their role in the People Power Revolution at the expense of Aquino and other civilian actors. On October 21, Enrile met with Aquino and demanded a greater share of political power and a revamp of her cabinet, which she refused.

Weeks before the coup, RAM began trying to rally support for the move from senior commanders of the Philippine Army, the Philippine Air Force, and the Philippine Marines, hoping to capitalize on their shared resentment against leftist elements in the government and investigations into human rights violations by the military.

=== Destabilization and assassination efforts ===
In the weeks leading to the coup, a series of attacks occurred in Manila were later linked to RAM, including three bombings, a grenade attack on Aquino's former campaign headquarters, and a gun attack on a Wendy's branch. This drew parallels with similar false flag attacks launched in the lead-up to the declaration of martial law by President Marcos in September 1972, ostensibly blaming the violence on communists.

Several assassinations also occurred during this time. On November 13, the head of the militant labor group Kilusang Mayo Uno (KMU) Rolando Olalia and his driver Leonor Alay-ay were abducted and later found brutally killed in Antipolo, Rizal. In 2017, senior RAM leader Lieutenant Colonel Eduardo Kapunan subsequently admitted ordering surveillance on Olalia before his murder, as well as on Labor Minister Sanchez. Olalia himself had threatened to wage another People Power Revolution should another coup be launched against Aquino. On November 22, Ulbert Ulama Tugung, a Filipino Muslim community leader and supporter of Aquino, was shot dead by unknown gunmen. It was believed the killings were designed to provoke a violent reaction from both the left and the Muslim community, overwhelming the government and enabling the military to step in.

On November 15, Japanese businessman Nobuyuki Wakaoji, the head of the Manila branch of Mitsui, was abducted in Laguna and held until April 1987 when he was released in exchange for a $10 million ransom. The National Bureau of Investigation suspected the kidnapping was orchestrated by RAM to embarrass Aquino during her state visit to Japan, which led Japanese investors to avoid the Philippines. However, in 2003, the New People's Army, the armed wing of the Communist Party of the Philippines, claimed responsibility for the kidnapping but said it was done without approval from Party leadership, adding it had killed Romulo Kintanar, the guerrilla commander responsible for the deed.

=== Plaza Miranda letters ===
RAM also began reviving rumors of involvement and collusion with the communists of President Aquino's assassinated husband, Senator Benigno "Ninoy" Aquino Jr., in the Plaza Miranda bombing in 1971, as part of an attempt to ruin her credibility. Kapunan held a press conference claiming that as an intelligence officer, he interviewed Ninoy's driver who said that he delayed his arrival at the senatorial rally that was bombed, insinuating his responsibility for the blast. RAM's chief propagandist, Captain Rex Robles, leaked to the media a letter from army officer turned NPA defector Lieutenant Victor Corpus, in which he claimed to have witnessed the CPP leadership planning the attack, which prompted him to surrender to the government.

On November 4, Enrile convened fellow co-conspirators at the home of Marine commander General Brígido Paredes, and unveiled their final plans for the coup, involving a commando raid on the presidential residence at Malacañang to capture Aquino and force her to "yield the powers of the presidency". They set the coup to be undertaken on November 11, on the eve of Aquino's state visit to Japan. There was no clear reason why the plot was codenamed "God Save the Queen", but investigators believed this was in reference to the plan being a modified version of a failed coup attempt by RAM against Marcos in February, which was codenamed "God Save the King", and indicated RAM's plan to maintain Aquino as a figurehead.

=== First discovery ===
On November 3, Robles approached Corpus again and tried to recruit him to the coup. Instead, Corpus reported the plot to Philippine Constabulary chief Renato de Villa, who then forwarded it to AFP Chief of Staff Fidel Ramos.

On November 7, the government decided to deliberately leak the plot to the press, which was then released as an exclusive by the Philippine Daily Inquirer on November 9. Following the leak, the AFP went on maximum alert, while left-wing groups threatened to go to the streets to prevent a military takeover. Later that day, Aquino delivered a departure speech before her state visit to Japan, denouncing any "attempt" from any quarter to interfere with or dictate" to her government. The remarks were seen as a provocation by Enrile, who then hoisted the Philippine war flag over his office at the Ministry of National Defense in Camp Aguinaldo, which was guarded by 800 soldiers and ten armored vehicles commanded by RAM leader Colonel Gringo Honasan. This resulted in a standoff that lasted until November 11, when Enrile backed down from his plans after negotiations with Ramos and other officers loyal to Aquino, in which they reaffirmed their allegiance to the civilian government.

=== Second discovery ===
On November 22, military intelligence found that Enrile and RAM leaders met with prominent Marcos loyalists at the home of Enrile's friend and former assemblyman Antonio Carag in Mandaluyong to finalize plans for a joint coup set for November 23, during which soldiers would converge on Manila. The dissolved Marcos-era legislature, the Regular Batasang Pambansa, was to reconvene and annul Aquino's victory against Marcos in the snap election on February 7, 1986, effectively removing her from office, and replace her with former Speaker Nicanor Yñiguez. One of the RAM leaders, Captain Felix Turingan, phoned Ramos and asked for his support, which the latter refused.

Following the killing of Ulama Tugung on the same day, which was the signal for RAM to trigger the coup, the military was placed on red alert as Ramos received reports of rebel forces arriving from Bicol Region and Cagayan Valley, while Honasan assembled a force composed of 200 men, ten Scorpion tanks and several V-150 armored vehicles around the Ministry of National Defense. Ramos responded by blockading Honasan's forces and gaining the support of uncommitted officers through frantic telephone calls. Additional reinforcements were sent to government offices and vital infrastructure and utilities, while AFP headquarters at Camp Aguinaldo, Constabulary headquarters at Camp Crame, and army headquarters at Fort Bonifacio, all commanded by Aquino loyalists, were fortified against an attack. Three battalions were also deployed to the Batasang Pambansa Complex in Quezon City to forestall any gatherings. Eventually, RAM backed down after Ramos delivered a stern warning that he would order his troops to open fire if the rebels made any further advances. The rebels began retreating to barracks at 3:00 pm on November 23.

=== Incidents in the provinces ===
While the second coup unfolded, several military units in the provinces announced their support for RAM, but did not push further. In Cebu City, 3,000 soldiers called on Aquino to revamp her cabinet and hold new presidential elections. Some of them flew over the city in helicopters and dropped leaflets carrying their demands. Another demonstration was held by the army garrison in Butuan.

=== End of the coup ===
The following day, Aquino announced she had sacked Enrile as Defense Minister, replacing him with Rafael Ileto, and that she would revamp her Cabinet, "to give the government a chance to start all over again." However, RAM responded by again barricading themselves at the defense ministry, prompting Ileto to personally intervene and convince RAM to stand down. In the succeeding months, Ileto – who called his office a "snake pit" filled with Enrile's personnel – gradually purged the ministry of the latter's staff.

== Aftermath ==
=== Political repercussions ===
Enrile was subsequently elected to the Senate in 1987 as one of only two minority members of the upper chamber, and became a staunch critic of the Aquino administration. Of the cabinet officials targeted by RAM, both Sanchez and Arroyo were later removed from office in what was seen as a move to placate the military, while Pimentel and Maceda resigned to successfully run for the Senate along with Sanchez, who lost.

Despite the involvement of politicians associated with Marcos in the coup, his political party, the Kilusang Bagong Lipunan, denied involvement in the plot, with Secretary General Salvador Britanico calling the accusations part of a disinformation campaign in the factional struggles within the military.

For their role in the coup, RAM leaders were reassigned outside Manila, which enabled them to recruit followers for their next coup attempt in August 1987. Kapunan was sent to the Philippine Military Academy in Baguio as an instructor, where he began to indoctrinate cadets in support of RAM's goals, while Honasan was transferred to Fort Magsaysay in Nueva Ecija, 200 kilometers north of Manila. where he trained and indoctrinated the Philippine Army's 1st Scout Ranger Regiment and the Philippine Army Special Forces into joining his rebellion against Aquino. Reflecting on the incident, a military officer remarked that "the heroes of February (RAM)" had become the "villains of November".

=== International reactions ===
The United States expressed it was pleased over the failure of the coup, and reiterated its support for Aquino's government. Congressman Stephen Solarz, who had previously suggested Enrile be removed from Aquino's cabinet before the coup, said that she had “won the hearts and minds of the American people.” Sam Nunn, chairman of the US Senate Armed Services Committee, commented that the AFP had to be reorganized and gain the people's confidence.

Australian foreign minister Bill Hayden said his government backed Aquino. An Indonesian newspaper editorial said that Aquino's sacking of Enrile would strengthen her government, while another editorial published in Thailand said the dismissal "had to happen.”

=== Prosecution of the Olalia-Alay-ay murders ===
After investigators found witnesses and evidence to link RAM to the Olalia-Alay-ay murders, a former RAM member in 1998 identified Kapunan as the mastermind. However, the case was stalled due to a prior amnesty granted to RAM members and other coup participants by Ramos, who by then had succeeded Aquino as President. Ultimately, Kapunan was acquitted in 2016 due to insufficient evidence, while three lower-ranking RAM officers were convicted in 2021 for the actual abduction and killing of Olalia and Alay-ay. Honasan, as RAM's leader, denied any involvement in the murders despite testimony by participants-turned witnesses.

== See also ==
- Coup attempts against Corazon Aquino
- September 30 Movement
- Strategy of tension
- Years of Lead (Italy)

== Bibliography ==
- The Davide Fact-Finding Commission (1990). The Final Report of the Fact-Finding Commission (pursuant to R.A. No. 6832). Makati: Bookmark Inc. p. 118. ISBN 971-569-003-3.
