= Adelina Rodriguez =

Filipino politician (1920–2021)

Adelina Santos-Rodriguez
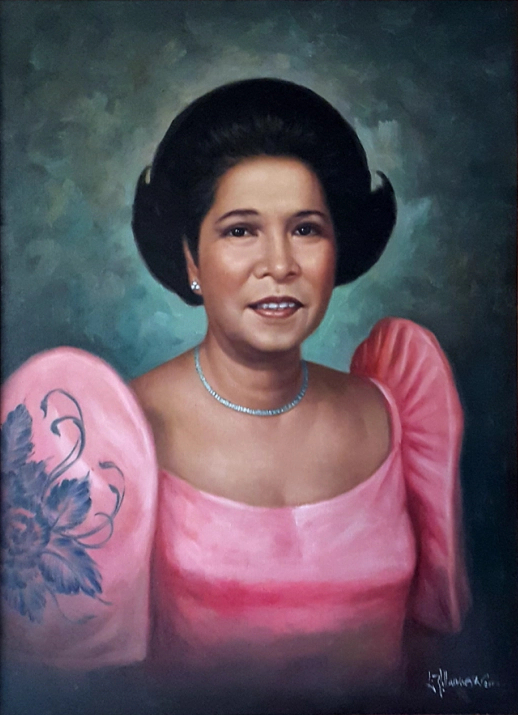
- Painted by Luisito Villanueva, c. 2000

6th Mayor of Quezon City
- In office March 31, 1976 – April 14, 1986
- Appointed by: Ferdinand Marcos
- Vice Mayor: Ronald Kookooritchin (1976–1980); Stephen Sarino (1980–1986)
- Preceded by: Norberto S. Amoranto
- Succeeded by: Brigido R. Simon, Jr.

Personal details
- Born: Adelina Galang Santos; August 6, 1920 Manila, Philippine Islands
- Died: September 30, 2021 (aged 101) Quezon City, Philippines
- Party: KBL (1980–1986)
- Other political affiliations: Nacionalista (1976–1980)
- Spouse: Isidro Rodriguez (m. 1941; died 1992)
- Children: 10
- Education: University of Santo Tomas
- Occupation: Politician
- Known for: First female mayor of Quezon City

Adelina Galang Santos Rodriguez (August 6, 1920 – September 30, 2021), sometimes referred to by her initials ASR, was a Filipino politician and civil leader who served as the first woman Mayor of Quezon City from 1976 to 1986. She also distinguished herself in charity work especially her programs for the Philippine Red Cross. She was married to Isidro Rodriguez, a softball official and former Governor of Rizal.

In July 1986, Rodriguez participated in a coup attempt against the Aquino administration at the Manila Hotel.

== Early life and education ==
Adelina Galang Santos was born on August 6, 1920 in Manila to Eleuterio Cacnio Santos and Virginia Espiritu Galang. She completed her primary education at Assumption Convent at Herran, Manila and high school education at the College of the Holy Ghost in Manila. She then attended University of Santo Tomas, where she was proclaimed "Miss Education" and completed her Home Economics degree. In the 1960s, Rodriguez was active in the post-war relocation projects of the People's Homesite and Housing Corporation in Quezon City.

== Political career ==
Rodriguez was appointed by President Ferdinand Marcos as mayor of Quezon City in 1976, following the resignation of Norberto S. Amoranto. She focused on healthcare (by establishing health centers across the city and promoting family planning and birth control), tourism, and culture. She also established an economic development council to invite more businesses, jobs, investments, and livelihood in the city. It was also during her term when the Quezon Memorial Shrine was inaugurated. After she was removed from office, she served as officer and head of different civic organizations and women's organizations. She was later conferred as the city's Tandang Sora awardee in 2016.

=== Participation in 1986 coup attempt ===
In July 1986, five months after the People Power Revolution overthrew President Ferdinand Marcos and resulted in Rodriguez's removal as Quezon City mayor, Rodriguez and her husband Isidro participated in a coup attempt led by Arturo Tolentino against the administration of President Corazon Aquino, in which soldiers briefly occupied the Manila Hotel.

== Death ==
Rodriguez died at the age of 101 on September 30, 2021.

== See also ==
- Mayor of Quezon City
- Isidro Rodriguez
- Ramon Magsaysay (Cubao) High School
