= Norberto S. Amoranto =

Filipino politician (1907–1979)

The Honorable Norberto S. Amoranto
- Amoranto in 1967

5th Mayor of Quezon City
- In office January 11, 1954 – March 30, 1976
- Appointed by: Ramon Magsaysay
- Vice Mayor: Ysidro Guevarra; (1954–1959); Vicente Ochoa Novales; (1960–1963); Mariano Santa Romana; (1964–1967); Mel Mathay; (1968–1971); Carlos L. Albert; (1972–1975)
- Preceded by: Ignacio S. Diaz
- Succeeded by: Adelina Santos Rodriguez

Personal details
- Born: Norberto Salandanan Amoranto; June 4, 1908 Biñan, La Laguna, Insular Government of the Philippine Islands, U.S.
- Died: December 22, 1979 (aged 71) Quezon City, Philippines
- Party: Nacionalista
- Occupation: Politician
- Profession: Lawyer
- Known for: Longest serving Mayor of Quezon City; First elected Quezon City mayor

Norberto Salandanan Amoranto (June 4, 1908 – December 22, 1979) was a Filipino politician who served as Mayor of Quezon City from 1954 to 1976.

== Career ==
Norberto S. Amoranto became Mayor of Quezon City when he was appointed to the position by President Ramon Magsaysay on January 11, 1954. He contested in the first ever Quezon City elections on November 10, 1959, where he became the first elected mayor of the city.

The current 15-storey Quezon City Hall building was built under Amoranto's term from 1964 to 1972. The structure was one of the most expensive city halls in the country.

Under Amoranto, the University of the Philippines Diliman, was allowed to maintain security of its campus without interference from the city police. This setup remained until, the national government's Peace and Order Council decided to forcibly intervene during the 1971 Diliman Commune uprising.

Amoranto resigned as mayor on March 30, 1976. He was replaced by Adelina Santos-Rodriguez, whom President then dictator Ferdinand Marcos appointed as his successor.

== Death ==
Amoranto died on December 22, 1979, the Day that Quezon City was elevated into a Highly - Urbanized City.

== Legacy ==
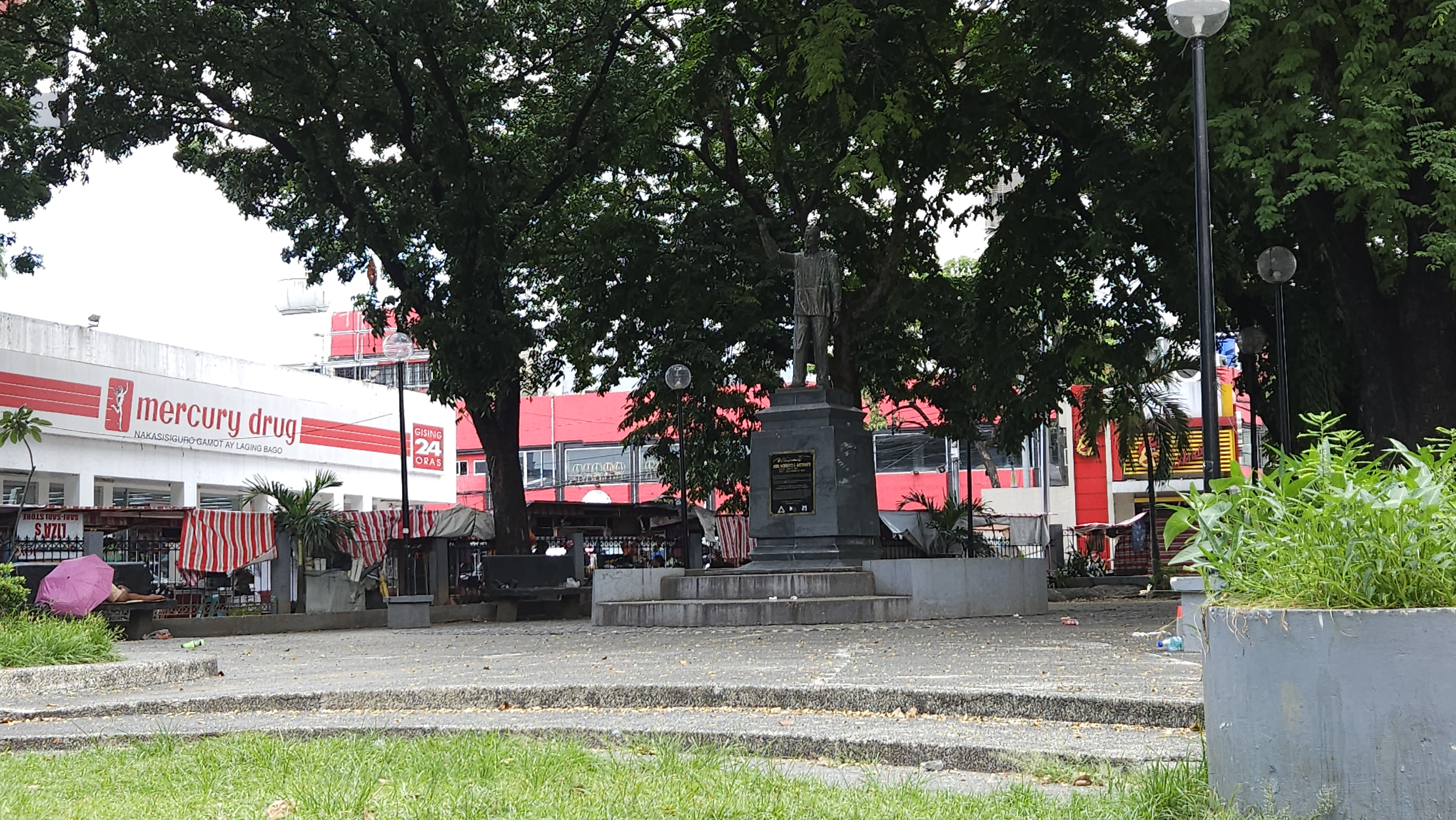
A statue of Amoranto at the N.S. Amoranto Park in Barangay N.S. Amoranto, Quezon City

Amoranto is noted for being the longest serving Mayor of Quezon City at 22 years spanning four presidencies (of Ramon Magsaysay, Carlos P. Garcia, Diosdado Macapagal, and Ferdinand Marcos). Several places in Quezon City were named after him such as barangay N.S. Amoranto (formerly known as Gintong Silahis until 1984), N.S. Amoranto Sr. Street (formerly called Retiro), and the Amoranto Sports Complex.
