= Cassandra Martyrs of Charity =

Filipino religious group

The Cassandra Martyrs of Charity were a group of twelve Catholic and Protestant religious workers who perished in the sinking of the M/V Doña Cassandra off the coast of Surigao on November 21, 1983.

These individuals were involved in church organizations which served communities impoverished and marginalized under the dictatorship of Ferdinand Marcos, and were on their way to a retreat and planning meeting in a Cebu city when their vessel began to capsize after being battered by Typhoon Warling (International name: Orchid). As a group, they were last seen "praying, distributing life vests, helping children put theirs on, instructing other passengers to hasten towards the life rafts and to be ready to abandon ship," but perished when emergency supplies ran out and the boat finally sank. The term "Martyr of Charity" is a widely (although not officially) used Catholic church classification for someone who dies as a result of a charitable act or of administering Christian charity.

Some of the group's members were later honored by having their names inscribed on the Wall of Remembrance at the Bantayog ng mga Bayani, which honors the heroes and martyrs whose actions eventually helped bring down the authoritarian regime.

== Individuals known as the "Cassandra Martyrs of Charity" ==
The Cassandra Martyrs of Charity included eight Catholic religious workers, a Protestant pastor, and three lay workers.

=== Catholic religious ===
- Sr. Consuelo (Remedios) Chuidian RGS;
- Sr. Concepcion (Lourdes) Conti RGS;
- Sr. Lucinda (Mary Catherine) Loreto RGS;
- Sr. Virginia (Mary Virginia) Gonzaga RGS;
- Sr. Josefa Medrano FMA,
- Sr. Amparo Gilbuena MSM,
- Sr. Antonette (Henrica, "Nanette") Berentsen of the Congregation of Julie Postel,
- Fr. Jan Simon Westendorp, O.Carm.

=== Protestant pastor ===
- Pastor Ben Bunio of the United Church of Christ in the Philippines.

=== Lay workers ===
Aside from Fr. Westerndorp, Pastor Bunio, and the sisters, there were three lay workers among the group:

- Inocencio “Boy” Ipong,
- Evelyn Hong, and
- Sena Canabria.

== Individuals honored at the Bantayog ng mga Bayani ==
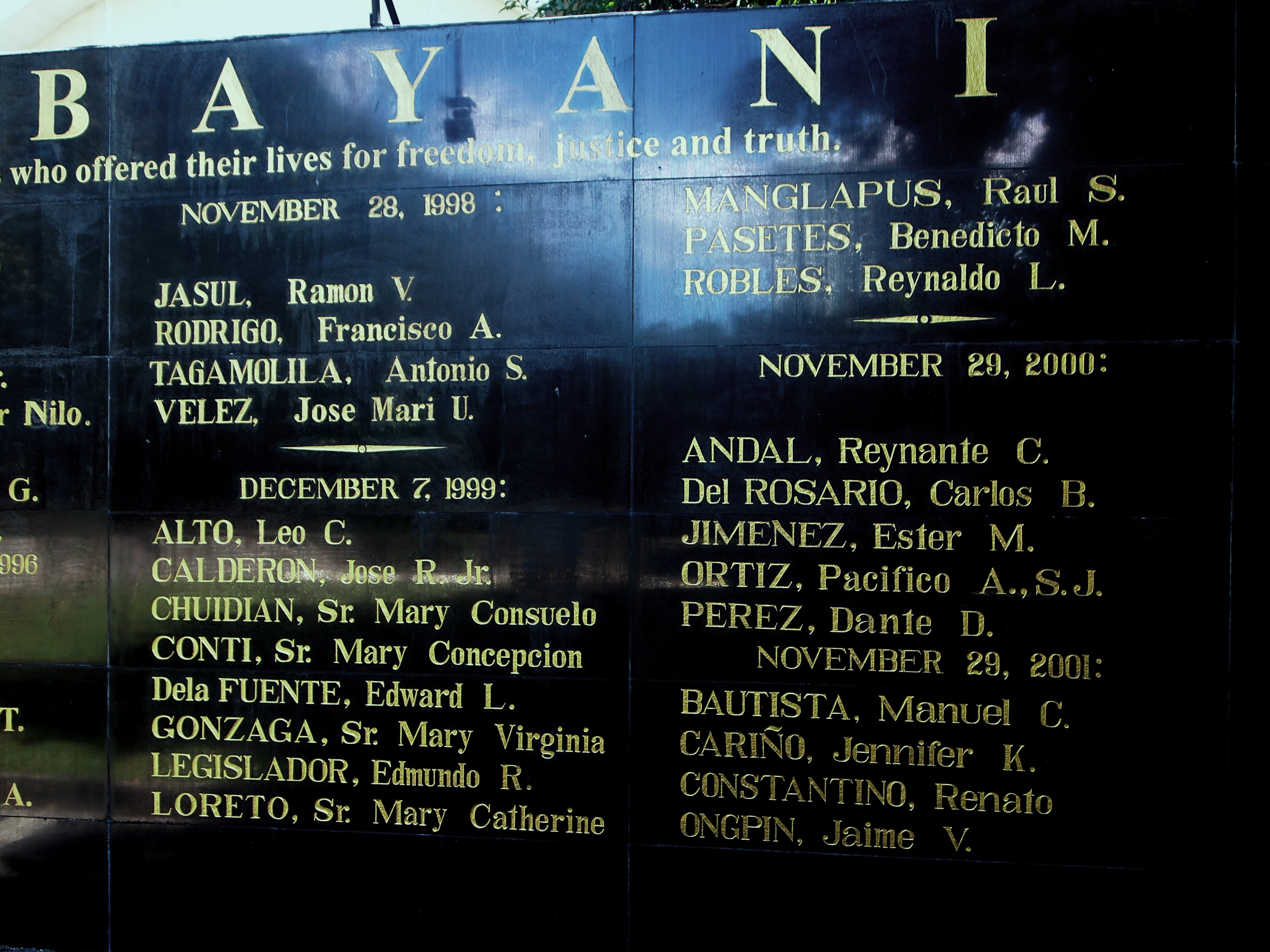
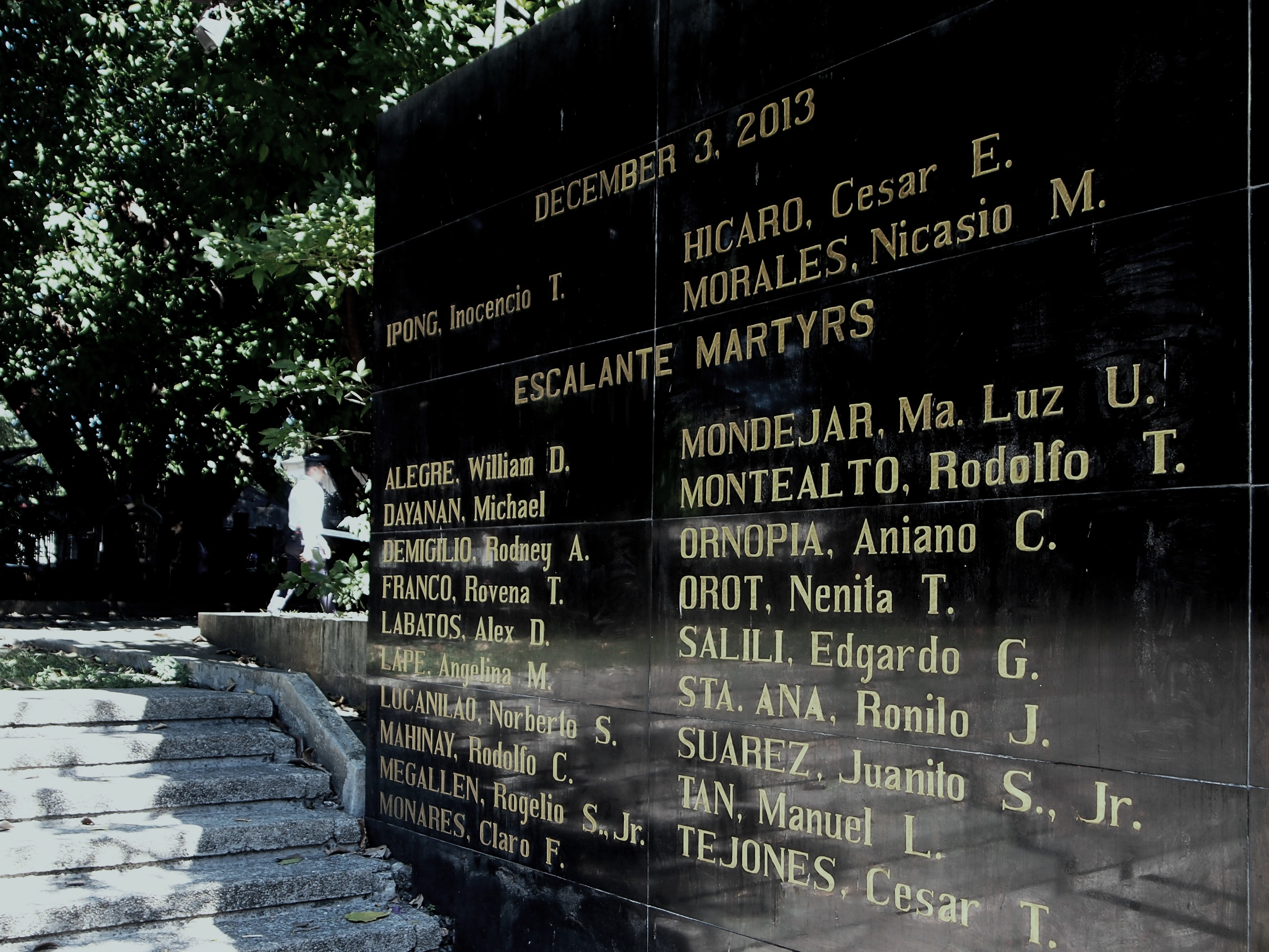
Details of the Wall of Remembrance at the Bantayog ng mga Bayani, showing the names of two separate batches of Bantayog Honorees (1999 and 2013 respectively), including that of the following martyrs: Remedios Chuidian, Lourdes Conti, Mary Virginia Gonzaga, and Mary Catherine Loreto (left/top), and Inocencio Ipong (right/bottom).

Inocencio Ipong of the Rural Missionaries of the Philippines (RMP) and Sisters Remedios Chuidian, Lourdes Conti, Mary Catherine Loreto, and Mary Virginia Gonzaga of the Religious of the Good Shepherd (RGS) were later nominated to be honored at the Bantayog ng mga Bayani, with the sisters honored in 1999, and Ipong honored in 2013. Their names are now engraved on the Bantayog's Wall of Remembrance.

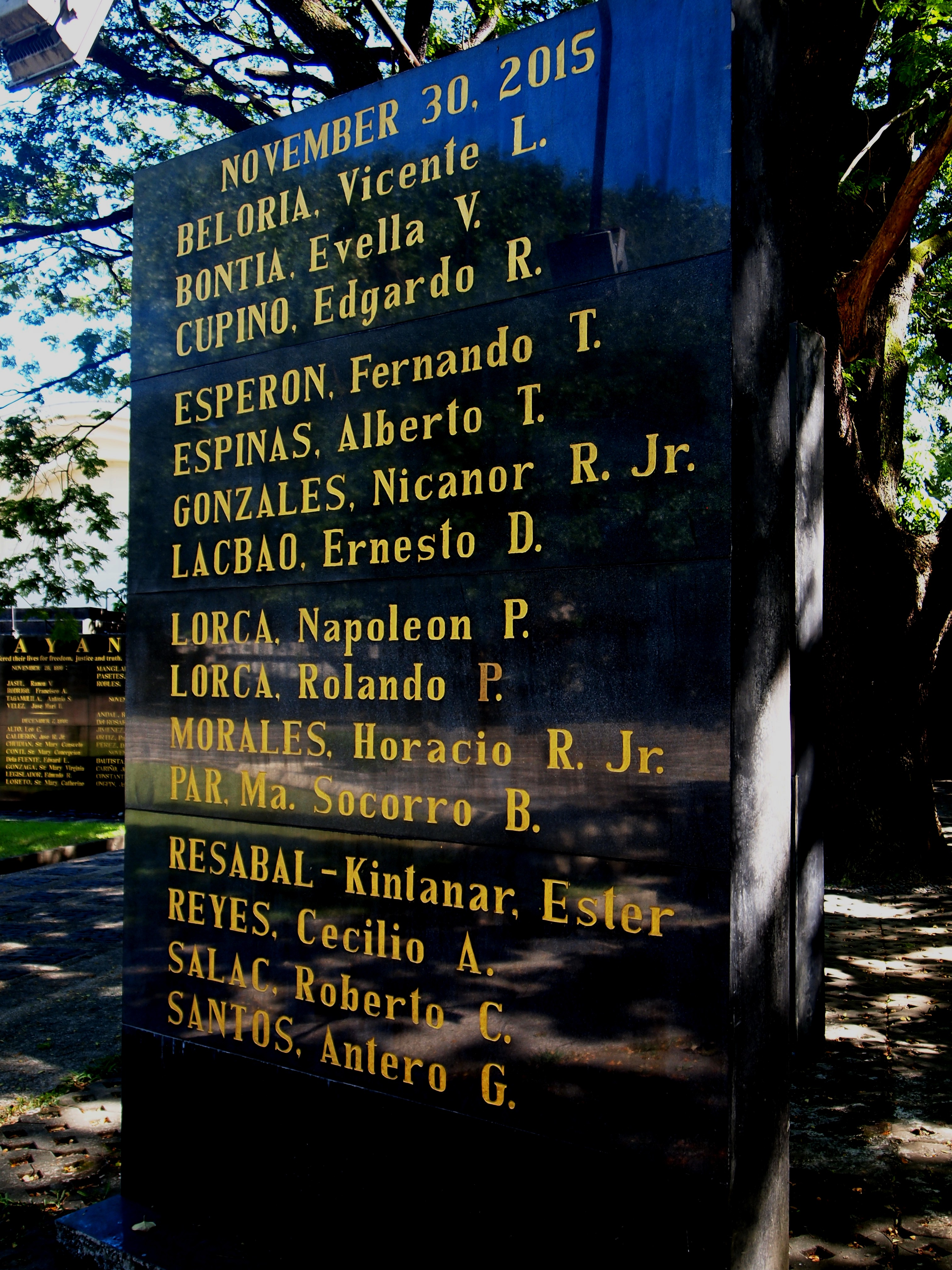
Detail of the Wall of Remembrance at the Bantayog ng mga Bayani, showing names from the 2015 batch of Bantayog Honorees, including that of Ester Resabal-Kintanar.

Also enshrined at the Bantayog is Ester Resabal-Kintanar, a teacher and activist who was also on board the M/V Doña Cassandra, but is generally not included as one of the Martyrs of Charity. She was honored in 2015.

== See also ==
- List of maritime disasters in the Philippines
