= Ester Resabal-Kintanar =

Ester "Teray" Resabal-Kintanar (February 15, 1951 - November 21, 1983) was a Filipino educator, activist, journalist, and church worker best known for her role in the resistance to the dictatorship of Ferdinand Marcos while teaching at the Mindanao State University - Iligan Institute of Technology in Iligan City. She is acknowledged both as a hero of Philippine Journalism and as a martyr of the resistance to the Marcos Dictatorship, with her name having been inscribed at the Philippines' Bantayog ng mga Bayani memorial, which honors the martyrs and heroes who fought the dictatorship.

She was editor-in-chief of the "Varsitarian," a publication of the Mindanao State University (MSU), while she was studying, and later became editor of the underground publication "Mindanaw."

She died during the sinking of th inter-island ferry MV Doña Cassandra.

== See also ==
- Iligan
- Mindanao State University–Iligan Institute of Technology
- Bantayog ng mga Bayani
- Cassandra Martyrs of Charity
