= Emilio Yap =

Philippine businessman (1925–2014)

Emilio Yap Sr. GCLH
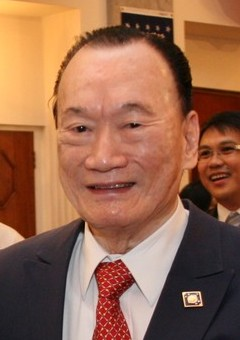
- Yap in 2011
- Born: September 24, 1925; Fujian Province, China
- Died: April 7, 2014 (aged 88)
- Resting place: Manila Memorial Park - Sucat, Parañaque
- Occupation: Businessman
- Known for: Chairman of Manila Bulletin

Emilio T. Yap Sr., GCLH (September 24, 1925 – April 7, 2014) was a Chinese Filipino business tycoon and philanthropist. He was the chairman of the board of the Manila Bulletin.

== Biography ==
Yap was born on September 24, 1925 in Fujian Province, China. He moved to the Philippines where he studied and worked in a business owned by his grandfather in Manila, then went to Dumaguete to work as a shopkeeper.

He began his business career in 1942.

== Career ==
In July 1984, Yap was elected as the chairman of the board of the Manila Bulletin, a position he held until his death in 2014. He was also the vice president of the executive department of the Manila Bulletin.

Yap was the chairman of Manila Hotel from 1997 until 2014, chairman of Centro Escolar University since 2002, and the chairman emeritus of Philtrust Bank. Forbes ranked Yap as the 15th wealthiest person in the Philippines in 2013, with an estimated net worth of $1.1 billion.

== Death and legacy ==
Yap died on April 7, 2014, at the age of 88, and was buried at the Manila Memorial Park in Parañaque on April 13, 2014.

On August 3, 2015, a facility inside the Philippine Red Cross Tower National Blood Center was named Don Emilio T. Yap Blood Apheresis Center in honor of his charitable works with the organization.

== Business Interests ==
The following companies are grouped under a de facto holding company named U.S. AUTOMOTIVE CO., INC. whose beneficial ownership are traceable to the estate &/or descendants of Yap. He set up this legal entity back in 1950 to purchase surplus military vehicles and supplies.

=== Education ===
- Centro Escolar University

=== Finance ===
- Philippine Trust Company (Philtrust Bank)

=== Food and Nutrition ===
( see subsidiaries under H&P )

=== Health and Pharmaceuticals ===
- Euro-Med Laboratories Phil. Inc.
  - CafeFrance Corp.
  - Hemotek Renal & Dialysis Center
  - Advanced Nutritional Technologies Inc.

=== Hospitality and Tourism ===
- Manila Hotel

=== Media ===
- Manila Bulletin Publishing Corp.

=== Real Estate ===
- Philtrust Realty Corp.
- U.N. Properties Development Corp.

=== Others ===
- Cocusphil Development Corporation

== See also ==
- Alfonso A. Uy
- Edgar Sia
