= Siege of the Manila Hotel =

Failed military overthrow of President Corazon Aquino

Manila Hotel siege
Date	6–8 July 1986
Location	Manila Hotel, Ermita, Manila, Philippines
Result	Philippine government victory: Coup averted; Surrender and dispersal of coup participants

Belligerents
Philippines	Marcos loyalists

Commanders and leaders
(Philippines) Corazon Aquino; Juan Ponce Enrile; Fidel Ramos; Ramon Montaño	Ferdinand Marcos; Arturo Tolentino; Jose Maria Zumel; Rolando Abadilla

Military support
Armed Forces of the Philippines	Marcos loyalists from the AFP; Civilian supporters of Marcos

The siege of the Manila Hotel (Filipino: Pagkubkob sa Manila Hotel) was an occupation of the Manila Hotel, a luxury hotel in the Philippine capital Manila, led by former vice-presidential candidate Arturo Tolentino and other military and civilian supporters of deposed President Ferdinand Marcos as part of a coup attempt to overthrow his successor, Corazon Aquino and restore him to power, on 6–8 July 1986. The coup failed to gain extensive support, and ended on 8 July with the departure of most participants and the surrender of others.

The coup occurred barely five months after Aquino was installed in office following the People Power Revolution in February, and was the first of nine attempts to topple Aquino's government. It was followed by the God Save the Queen Plot in November later that year.

== Background ==
After Marcos' overthrow and exile to Hawaii in February 1986, his supporters regularly held rallies demanding his restoration as president every Sunday at Manila's Luneta Park, which was next to the Manila Hotel, a luxury hotel that was a prominent gathering place for politicians, expatriates and other leading members of Philippine society. The rallies were often attended by prominent personalities associated with Marcos who had stayed behind in the Philippines, including Arturo Tolentino, Marcos' running mate in the 1986 snap presidential election on 7 February, whose disputed outcome precipitated the People Power Revolution on 22–25 February that ousted Marcos and installed his electoral rival, Corazon Aquino.

The coup was launched whilst the Aquino government was grappling with several issues such as student unrest in Metro Manila, agrarian reform, rising tensions with the Armed Forces of the Philippines regarding negotiations with the CPP-NPA to end the communist insurgency and the supposed presence of left-wing officials in Aquino's cabinet, the drafting of a new constitution, and preparations for Aquino's state visit to the United States.

=== Preparations for the coup ===
A few days before the coup, Tolentino reportedly booked four adjoining rooms at the Manila Hotel's 14th floor under a woman's name, while other loyalists booked rooms under false names and used codes to communicate with each other. They also brought ample stocks of food and water for a prolonged stay.

The coup was also known beforehand to several military officers, including those affiliated with the Reform the Armed Forces Movement (RAM), which helped lead the People Power Revolution. It later emerged that Marcos loyalist officer Colonel Rolando Abadilla contacted RAM leader Gringo Honasan a month before the coup, asking for their support. However, RAM adopted a wait-and-see approach, although in an apparent sign of rapprochement, senior RAM official Rodolfo Aguinaldo was also seen inside the hotel during the coup. On the morning of the coup, prominent Marcos loyalists at the InterContinental Manila invited American journalist Jack Anderson to their regular Sunday rally at the Luneta, promising a "scoop".

== Events ==
=== Occupation of the hotel ===
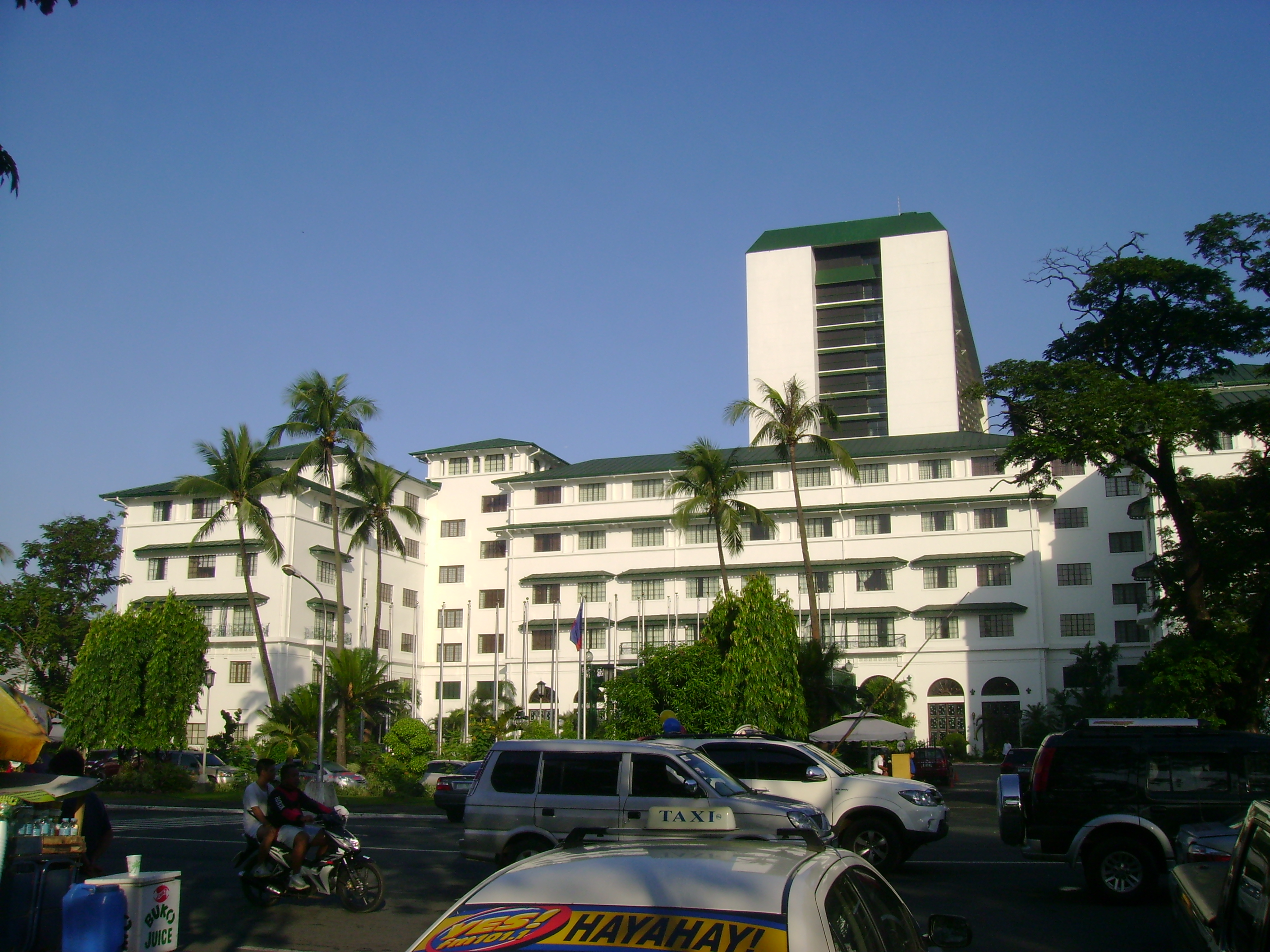
Manila Hotel in 2012

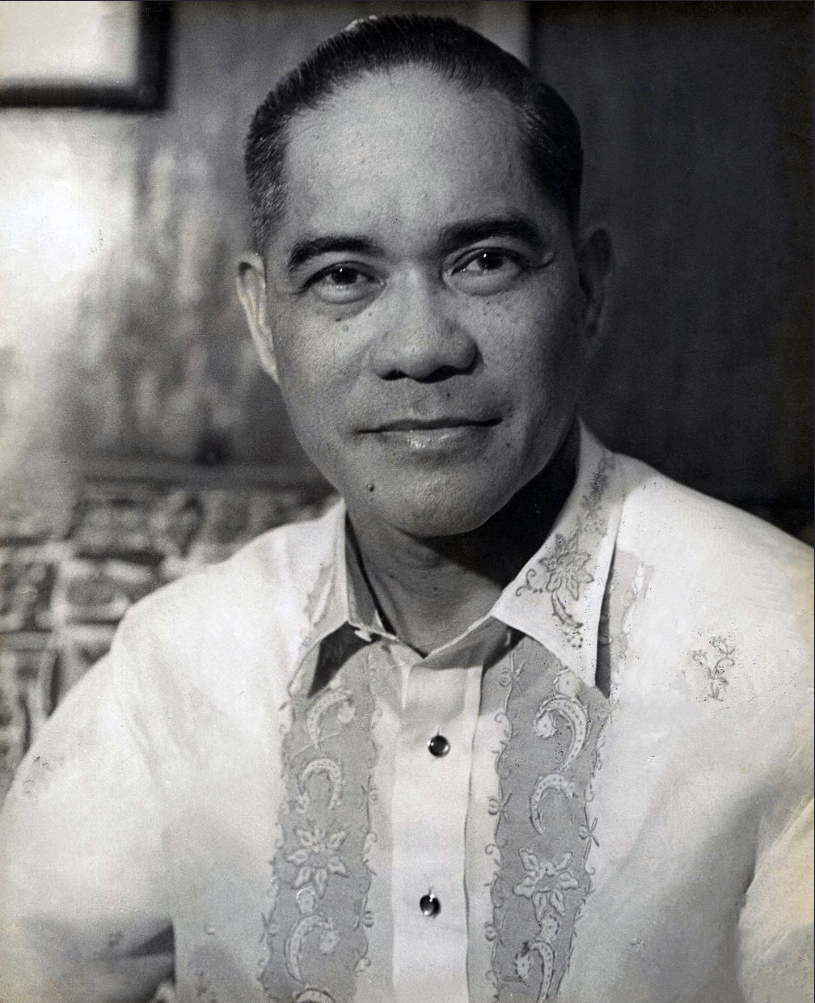
Arturo Tolentino

During the regular Marcos loyalist rally at the Luneta's Quirino Grandstand on 6 July 1986, some 100 armed soldiers and civilians entered the Manila Hotel and set up camp in the lobby, with Brigadier General Jose Maria Zumel, a former superintendent of the Philippine Military Academy and officer in Marcos' Presidential Security Command, informing the hotel's head of catering of their takeover. Likewise, a former assistant manager of the hotel who was related to a Marcos official proclaimed himself the hotel's new general manager, while an officer working for Marcos' exiled AFP Chief of Staff Fabian Ver declared himself the hotel's security chief. The total number of occupiers was later estimated to be about 490 military personnel and 5,000 civilians. Many of the soldiers arrived on military trucks and jeeps from camps in Metro Manila and Central Luzon and were armed with machine guns and wireless radios. Many were also members of the Guardians Brotherhood, a mutual-aid society within the AFP that was seen as close to Honasan.

An hour later, at the hotel's driveway, Tolentino announced that Marcos had authorized him to temporarily take over the government. He then took his oath as Acting President in front of a former Supreme Court justice, and designated a five-person cabinet composed of Rafael Recto as Minister of Justice, Manuel Collantes as Minister of Foreign Affairs, Manuel Alba as Minister of Budget, Isidro Rodriguez Jr. as Minister of Local Government, and Juan Ponce Enrile as Minister of National Defense and concurrent Prime Minister. Tolentino also ordered Nicanor Yñiguez, the speaker of Marcos' dissolved rubber-stamp parliament, the Regular Batasang Pambansa, to convene the body and call for local elections.

In an interview, Tolentino said he did want to have any "real confrontation" with Aquino, but said he hoped she would "listen to the will of the people." He said he could not stay at the hotel for long, citing its expensiveness, but insisted that he would continue to "assert the authority as the legitimate government." Tolentino also claimed to have received a congratulatory telephone call from Marcos in Hawaii.

Other Marcos loyalists made speeches throughout the evening, while supporters camped in and around the hotel overnight. They were supplied with food, drinks and pro-Marcos T-shirts, and barricaded the approaches to the hotel using trucks, buses, concrete flower pots and burning tires. Several teenage supporters were seen manning the roadblocks armed with rocks. A Navy gunboat was also reported to have docked in Manila Bay to support the rebels, while officials in Quezon City reported that there were attempts to recruit residents to support the loyalists.

As time passed however, the momentum of the coup gradually disappeared due to a lack of reinforcements and popular support. An early morning downpour on 7 July reduced the number of participants to a few hundred by daybreak. In the morning, some 200 rebel soldiers surrendered, saying that they were misled into thinking that they were supporting Enrile and AFP Chief of Staff Fidel Ramos, both of whom spearheaded the People Power uprising in February. All 300 guests and employees were also evacuated from the hotel at the same time. Tolentino then held a press conference, claiming that he was forced into taking the oath of office by the "clamor" of the crowd and called on Aquino to hold early elections.

The coup was seen as an attempt to try and replicate a joint civil-military uprising in the hopes of gathering enough support to seize the presidential residence at Malacañang, similar to what happened during the People Power Revolution.

=== Prominent participants ===
Several military officers associated with Marcos were also seen during the takeover, including:

- Major General Prospero Olivas, former commander of the Philippine Constabulary Metropolitan Command (Metrocom)
- Brigadier General Antonio Palafox, former commander of the Philippine Army's 5th Infantry Division
- Brigadier General Jaime Echeverria, former regional commander in Central Mindanao
- Brigadier General Tomas Dumpit, former regional commander in Ilocos
- Rear Admiral Brillante Ochoco, former flag officer of the Philippine Navy
- Colonels Rolando Abadilla, former Metrocom head of Intelligence and Security
- Colonel Dictador Alqueza, former Constabulary commander in Samar who was involved in the Jabidah Massacre
- Colonel Jose Mendoza
- Colonel Rolando de Guzman
- Colonel Reynaldo Cabauatan, former Constabulary commander in Zambales

Politicians associated with Marcos were also seen at the hotel, including:

- Gerardo Espina Sr. (former assemblyman from Leyte)
- Salvador Britanico (former assemblyman from Iloilo)
- Edmundo Reyes (former Immigration Commissioner)
- Vicente Magsaysay (former Governor of Zambales)
- Adelina Rodriguez (former mayor of Quezon City)
- Boy Asistio (former mayor of Caloocan)
- Joseph Estrada (former mayor of San Juan)
- Felicisimo Cabigao (former vice mayor of Manila)
- Gregorio Licaros (former governor of the Central Bank)

Several actors also participated in the coup, including Amay Bisaya, Alona Alegre, Elizabeth Oropesa, Amalia Fuentes, Weng Weng, Carlos Salazar and Rio Diaz.

=== Marcos' involvement ===
While the coup was unfolding, a spokesman for Marcos in Honolulu said that he was monitoring the events closely and would return to the Philippines as an "elder statesman" if Aquino was overthrown. He also said Marcos was unaware of Tolentino's plans. After the coup failed, Marcos personally denied involvement in any coups or acts of sedition and destabilization against the government.

However, in August 1987, transcripts containing seven calls by Marcos to supporters at the Manila Hotel were released, appearing to show that Marcos extensively knew about the planned coup and directed events once it came. The conversations were recorded during the first 14 hours of the coup before the evacuation of all employees from the hotel and were transcribed by the hotel's telephone operator at the instruction of hotel officials. Among the details that were released was that Marcos had three men at the hotel directly monitoring the situation for him, and that he dissuaded his supporters from marching on Malacañang pending the arrival of reinforcements led by his close ally, former Lanao del Sur governor Ali Dimaporo. The conversations contributed to the government's view that the coup was a "pre-planned and premeditated conspiracy" to destabilize the Aquino government.

Following the revelations, the Reagan administration opened an inquiry into Marcos' involvement in the coup and said it would review his guest status in the United States if it were shown that he was involved in "partisan political activities" in the Philippines in violation of the Neutrality Act.

=== Government response ===
The coup occurred at a time when the leading figures of Aquino's government were away from Manila. Aquino was accompanied by Ramos in Cagayan de Oro when the coup broke out, forcing their return to Manila, while vice president Salvador Laurel was on an official visit to Spain.

Defense Minister Juan Ponce Enrile, who was formerly Marcos' defense minister before switching sides to Aquino during the People Power revolt and was the highest-ranking official of Aquino's government in the capital, rejected his inclusion in Tolentino's cabinet. Aquino insisted on maximum tolerance in dealing with the rebels, but warned of arrests in case violence broke out, and said it was best to ignore Tolentino, calling him a "nobody", while announcing plans to charge him with sedition.

As a precaution, roadblocks were set up on roads leading to Malacañang, about three miles from the hotel. Eight armored personnel carriers were deployed at the Luneta, while additional soldiers were deployed at bridges and other strategic points in Manila, including radio and television transmitters. Four radio stations were temporarily closed down for spreading loyalist propaganda.

At the hotel, water and electricity were cut off, while employees shut down telephone and public address systems.

=== Negotiations and end of the coup ===
Negotiations between the government and the rebels began at midnight on 6–7 July between generals Zumel and metropolitan police chief Ramon Montaño, who was acting on instructions from Enrile.

In the meantime, various suggestions were made on how to end the coup, ranging from an attack to a total blockade. One cabinet minister suggested threatening the last coup participant to leave the hotel with paying the full bill for all their companions.

At 2 p.m. on 7 July, Aquino issued a statement insisting that her government was still in control and ordered the rebels to surrender within 24 hours. Shortly afterwards, Tolentino and other key followers left the hotel and resumed negotiations with the government at the nearby Army and Navy Club and later at a police outpost behind Quirino Grandstand that was attended by Honasan and Aquino's son Noynoy.

While negotiations were underway, Honasan, who had regularly briefed his political patron Enrile on the coup's developments, approached the rebels with a promise of amnesty from the latter, who had not consulted the matter with Aquino, and extracted Colonel Abadilla, who had been liaising with them, from the hotel. This enabled the surrender of the rebel soldiers and the non-violent dispersal of civilian participants in the early morning of 8 July.

The rebel soldiers were brought to Philippine Army headquarters in Fort Bonifacio, where Enrile surprised everyone by publicizing his offer of a blanket amnesty, saying that "no punishment" would be given and urging everyone to "forget" what had happened. To help defuse the tension, General Ramos ordered the rebels to do thirty push-ups, which was later erroneously reported to be their only punishment and became a point of criticism for those who advocated a harsher response to the revolt. On 9 July, Aquino offered clemency to the participants in exchange for taking the “oath of loyalty to the Freedom Constitution.”

== Aftermath ==
=== Damages to the hotel ===
The three-day takeover of the 500-room Manila Hotel resulted in the facility sustaining its worst damage since the Battle of Manila in 1945. Its general manager Franz Schutzman estimated the damage at $500,000 and noted that the hotel lost five business days, two during the actual occupation and three to cleanup efforts.

The doors of 26 rooms on the sixth floor were pried open, and all their towels, leather-bound folders and even the brass numbers on the doors were stolen. Other rooms and corridors occupied by the rebels were strewn with trash and leftover food and ransacked, as were the hotel's restaurant, pantry and bar. A dozen improvised explosives were discovered in the lobby. The hotel president, Feliciano Belmonte Jr., said $15,000 went missing from cash registers and four safety-deposit boxes were forced open.

Tolentino and his followers had only paid for the rooms they occupied at the 14th floor and only for one night. Despite the Manila Hotel being government-owned at the time, Aquino insisted that Tolentino reimburse the damages, saying that "their boss (Marcos) had left enough debt".

The Ministry of Tourism said that at least 670 hotel reservations by prospective foreign visitors in Metro Manila were cancelled as a result of the coup.

=== Prosecution of coup participants ===
Tolentino and 34 others were sued by the Manila Hotel for damages reaching up to $850,000. Nevertheless, this did not prevent him from subsequently visiting the hotel and attending events hosted by its management. He avoided further prosecution by the government by swearing allegiance to Aquino's government, while insisting that he was still the legitimate vice president of the country.

The involvement of Enrile and RAM in the coup was never properly investigated, which appeared to have encouraged them to launch subsequent plots against Aquino's government.

=== Political repercussions ===
Enrile's inclusion in Tolentino's cabinet, despite his disavowals, strained his relations with Aquino and contributed to his dismissal as defense minister following the God Save the Queen Plot later that year in November.

Tolentino was later elected to the Philippine Senate in 1992 and served until 1995.

The public, still reeling from the excesses of the Marcos regime, remained generally unaffected by the coup.

=== International reaction ===
The United States reiterated its support for Aquino's government, with State Department officials calling the coup a "tempest in a teapot" and the "last desperate act" of Marcos supporters.

== See also ==
- Coup attempts against Corazon Aquino
- List of presidents of the Philippines#Unofficial presidents
- Manila Peninsula siege

== Bibliography ==
- Davide Fact-Finding Commission (1990). The Final Report of the Fact-Finding Commission (pursuant to R.A. No. 6832). Makati: Bookmark Inc. p. 118. ISBN 971-569-003-3.
