= Philtrust Bank =

Bank in the Philippines

Philippine Trust Company

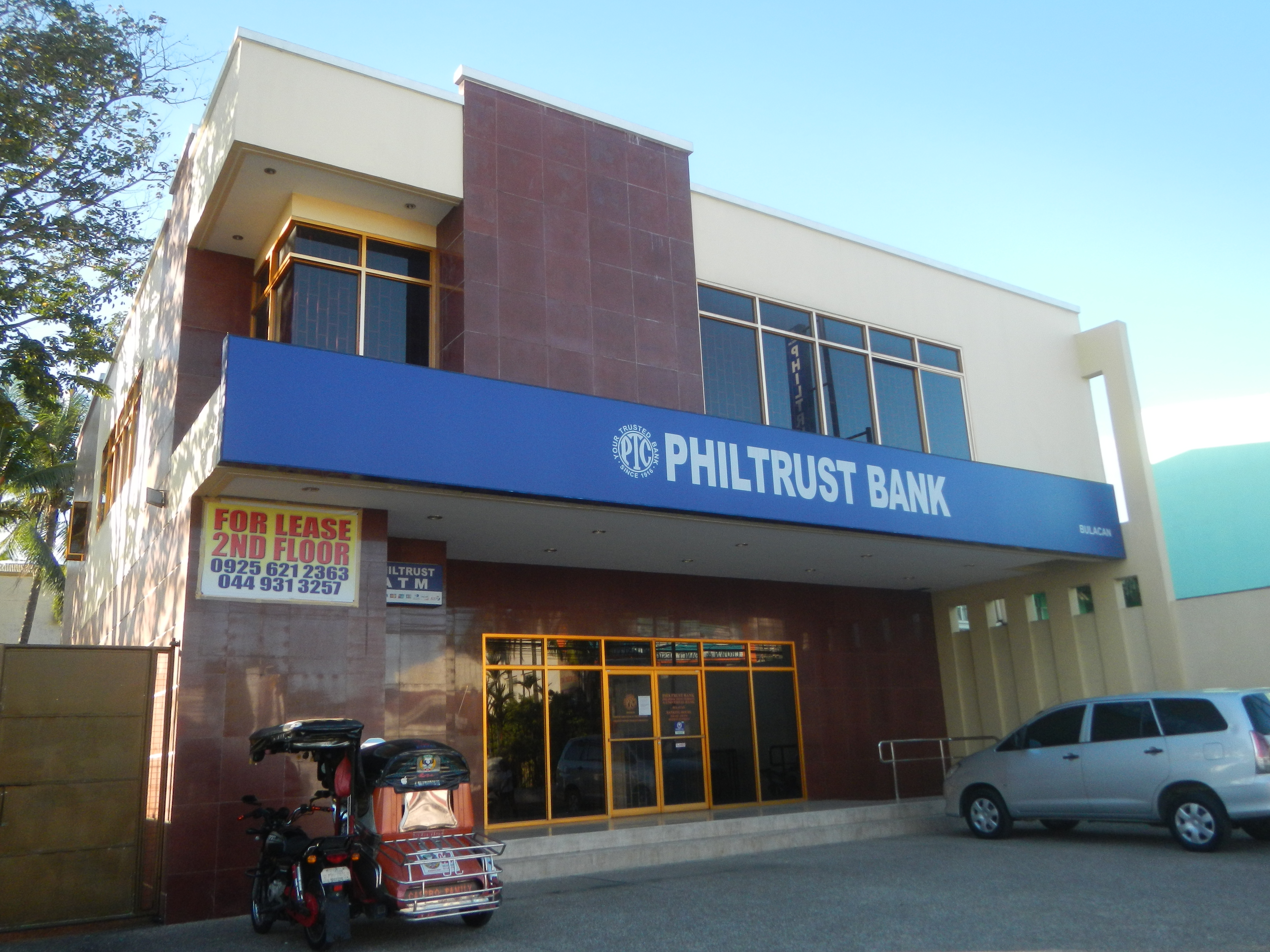
- Branch in Malolos, Bulacan
- Type: Public
- Traded as: PSE: PTC
- ISIN: PHY6965Q1059
- Industry: Finance and Insurance
- Founded: October 16, 1916; 109 years ago
- Headquarters: Manila, Philippines
- Key people: Basilio C. Yap (Chairman); Josue N. Bellosillo (Vice Chairman); Emilio C. Yap III (Vice Chairman); Jaime C. Laya (President)
- Products: Financial services
- Revenue: ₱7.7 billion (2020)
- Operating income: ₱1.5 billion (2020)
- Net income: ₱780.4 million (▲9%) (2020)
- Total assets: ₱160.8 billion (2020)
- Total equity: ₱25.7 billion (2020)
- Number of employees: 602
- Website: www.philtrustbank.com

The Philippine Trust Company (PSE: PTC, Also known in Hokkien Chinese: 菲律濱信託銀行; Pe̍h-ōe-jī: Hui-li̍p-pin Sìn-thok Gûn-hâng; & Mandarin simplified Chinese: 菲律滨信托银行; traditional Chinese: 菲律濱信託銀行; pinyin: Fēilǜbīn Xìntuō Yínháng), commonly known as Philtrust Bank, is one of the oldest private universal banks in the Philippines. Founded on October 16, 1916, its history parallels the growth of the Philippine banking system. It is the third bank to be established in the Philippines, after Bank of the Philippine Islands and Philippine National Bank. The bank is one of the businesses that was owned by Chinese-Filipino businessman, Emilio Yap.

As of December 16, 2010, Philtrust Bank has a total market capitalization of ₱40.6 billion and share price of ₱70.00.

As of March 31, 2012, it has Total Assets of R103.767 Billion, Total Deposits of R87.628 Billion, Total Net Worth of R15.431 Billion, Total Paid-Up Capital of R10 Billion with Authorized Capital Stock of R22 Billion. To date, Philtrust Bank has a total of 40 branches in Metro Manila and 21 provincial branches.

== History ==
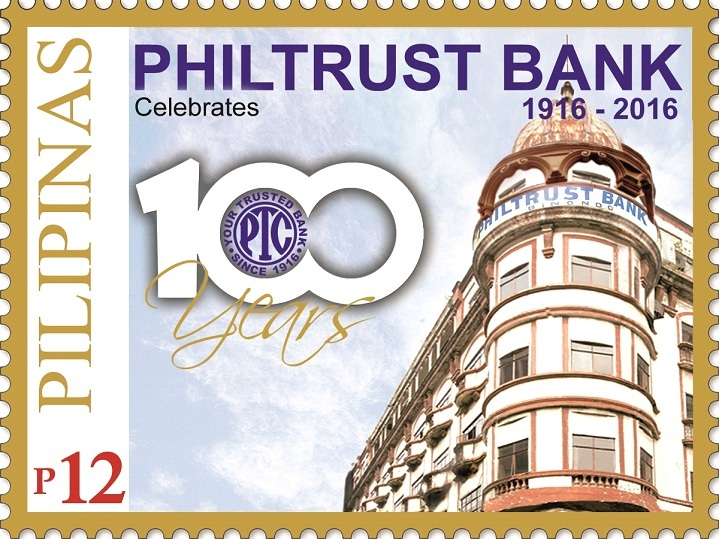
A 2016 stamp dedicated to the 100th anniversary of Philtrust Bank

Philtrust Bank was established in 1916 as the first bank to engage in trust business, still non-existent in the early 1900s despite the increasing demand for estate administration and guardianship services. The bank started with just one million authorized capital stocks, half of which was paid up.

Even the Office of the United States Veterans Administration, then known as the Veterans Bureau, engaged Philippine Trust Company to handle guardianship of deceased Veteran's children. Among the customers of Philtrust Bank was Gen. Douglas MacArthur.

After World War II, the government, through the Rehabilitation Finance Corporation infused fresh capital. The bank's authorized capital stock was increased to ₱3 million, of which, ₱2 million was paid-up between existing shareholders and the RFC.

The bank's resources continued to grow and by 1966, 50 years after its founding, it had a total resources of ₱119.5 million.

In 1978, several parties expressed interest in acquiring controlling interest and approached the Roman Catholic Archbishop of Manila, the principal stockholder of Philtrust Bank then. Archbishop Jaime Cardinal Sin eventually decided to sell the stake to Emilio T. Yap because he believed that Yap "could maintain the trust and confidence of the Bank’s clients and would contribute greatly to the growth, stability and success of the Bank."

On October 17, 1978, Yap took over Philtrust Bank and in 1988, Philtrust bank was listed in the Makati Stock Exchange and Manila Stock Exchange.

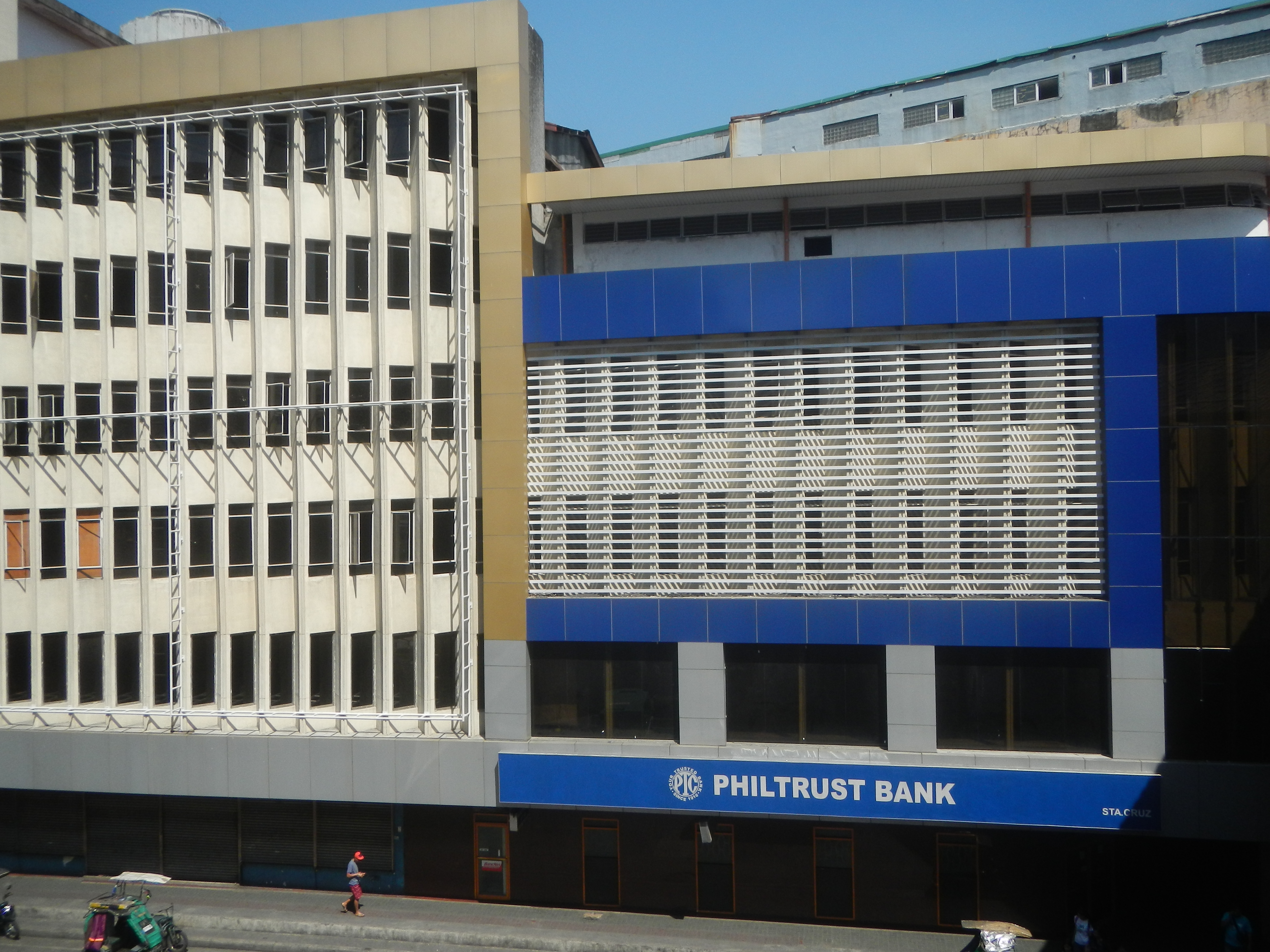
Façade of the Santa Cruz branch in Manila

In 2007, the Bangko Sentral ng Pilipinas granted universal banking license to Philtrust Bank. The Philippines’ Securities and Exchange Commission also approved the registration of the Bank's Amended Articles of Incorporation, with powers among others, to engage in the business of expanded commercial banking as a universal bank, to carry on the business of a trust company, exercise the powers of investment houses as provided in pertinent laws and the power and authority to invest in the equity of allied and non-allied corporations, business or undertakings, and to perform such other acts and functions as may be permitted by law.

In 2006, Yap, through Philtrust Bank, announced the acquisition of the 58% share of Philippine Bank of Communications owned by the Chung and Nubla families, for ₱3 billion or ₱30 per share. The bid was higher than Lucio Tan’s ₱20 per share offer. However, in 2009, Yap withdrew its bid saying the officers of Philtrust Bank are no longer interested in acquiring PBCom.

== Branches ==
=== Binondo, Manila ===
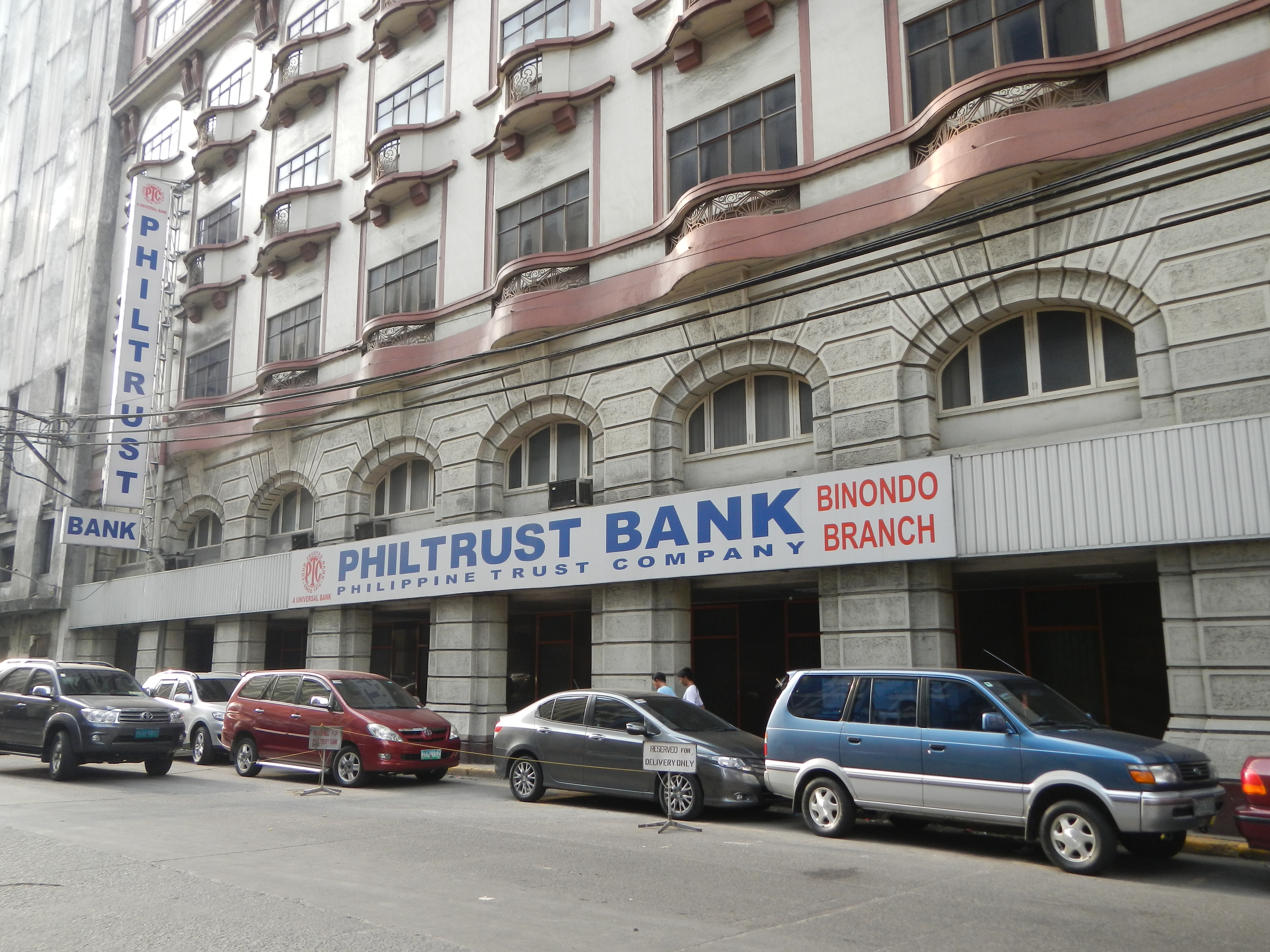
Binondo branch in 2014

Departing from neoclassical style was the Art Nouveau Mariano Uy Chaco Building, now the Philtrust Building, designed by Samuel E. Rowell in 1914. The building was the headquarters of Uy Chaco and Sons, a hardware firm that imported and distributed American products locally. The six-storey structure, located at the northwestern corner of the former Plaza Cervantes, featured undulating balconies with elaborate wrought iron grilles set into its apex. Such organic patterns, shown in the ironworks and fluid curves exhibited in the balconies were the essential characteristics of the Art Nouveau style. The building possessed articulated bays totalling to eight; each consisted of an arch on the first floor and a slightly projecting, curved balcony on the third, fourth and fifth floors. The façade was broken at the sixth floor by an open circulation space accented by alternating narrow and wide, oval-shaped frames.

There is an ornamental, projecting turret crowned by a ribbed, eight-sided, bell-shaped cupola surfaced by iron tiles made to appear like shingles on the corner facing Plaza Cervantes. The turret doubled as a clock tower, with a series of clocks surrounding the circumference of the cupola's base. The oldest-looking portion of the building's façade was the first floor, as it evoked a Neo-Renaissance character with its stylized rusticated bands and stepped arches with false keystones.

== Operations and Services ==
Its principal activities remain in commercial and investment banking services. Philtrust offers domestic, international and trust services.

Its domestic services offered are: savings, checking and time deposits, money market placements, business loans, remittances, transfer of funds and collections, safety deposit services and securities investments.

International transactions include: traveler's cheque, foreign exchange, Foreign Currency Deposit Unit transactions, commercial letters of credit, international remittances and collections.

They also provide trust operations and investment management: trust placement, investment management, estate administration / trustee of bond issues escrow services, administration of savings, insurance and pension plans, stock registry and transfer agent services.

== Ownership ==
- Philtrust Realty Corporation: 26.90%
- Seabreeze Enterprises: 19.47%
- U.S. Automotive: 100
- Orient Enterprises: 18.48%
- Others (includes public stock): 15.77%

== See also ==
- BancNet
- List of banks in the Philippines
