= MV Karagatan incident =

1972 arms trafficking incident

- MV Karagatan hits a rock while on waters off Digoyo Point
- Date: July 4, 1972
- Location: Digoyo Point, Palanan, Isabela, Philippines; 16°55′00.6″N 122°27′48.5″E
- Type: Arms trafficking
- Motive: Arms trafficking for the New People's Army for use in the communist rebellion in the Philippines
- Participants: New People's Army; China (financier)
- Outcome: Arms shipment intercepted by the Philippine military; MV Karagatan sank and crew abandoned ship
- Property damage: MV Karagatan (sank)

The July 1972 MV Karagatan incident was an unsuccessful attempt by the New People's Army — the armed wing of the Marxist–Leninist–Maoist Communist Party of the Philippines (CPP) — to smuggle armaments from China into the Philippines via the ship MV Karagatan. The incident is notable for having been cited by President Ferdinand Marcos as one of his rationales for imposing martial law in the Philippines in September 1972.

== Background and planning ==
Jose Maria Sison, the founder of the Communist Party of the Philippines (CPP), requested Chinese aid for military and monetary support of the New People's Army (NPA), the CPP's armed wing. Sison secured support from Mao Zedong, the Chairman of the Chinese Communist Party. At that time, China actively provided arms to North Vietnam and other left-aligned Third World countries. The CPP-NPA asked for a submarine from China; instead, China agreed to fund the purchase of a ship that would transport arms into the Philippines for use of the NPA.

Sison sent Fidel Agcaoili to Japan to purchase an old 91-ton, 27.43 metres (90.0 ft) steel hulled fishing trawler which was known as the Kishi Maru. Kishi Maru was rechristened as MV Karagatan. The MV Karagatan went to Fukien (modern-day Fujian), where it was loaded with 1,200 firearms intended to be smuggled into the Philippines. The ship left China by the end of June 1972.

== Arms landing ==
The MV Karagatan reached the Digoyo Point in Palanan, Isabela, Philippines. On July 4, 1972, the crew of the ship boarded a dinghy and met with their NPA contacts along the shore. Victor Corpus, a defector from the Philippine military and a member of the NPA at the time, was tasked with leading the group that would receive the armaments at shore.

The arms on board the MV Karagatan were unloaded using multiple bangka. During the unloading, a small plane passed over the area. Believing they had been found by the Philippine military, the MV Karagatan crew moved their ship closer to the mouth of the Digoyo River. Another plane flew over the area at sunset, which was identified by the crew as a T-34 Mentor. The ship captain then started the engine, causing the MV Karagatan's hydraulic system to sustain damage after hitting a rock. While the ship underwent repairs, the captain turned on the radar and spotted an unidentified vessel moving towards the boat. The crew abandoned the ship and headed towards the shore.

== Aftermath ==
With the help of a Dumagat guide, the crew of the MV Karagatan escaped to the Sierra Madre to meet up with the NPA. The Philippine military was able to intercept the armaments, and the damaged MV Karagatan sank to the bottom of the sea. The incident was cited as a justification by President Ferdinand Marcos when he imposed martial law over the Philippines on September 21, 1972. Among the other reasons were the 1971 Plaza Miranda bombing and the 1972 ambush of then-Defense Minister Juan Ponce Enrile. When Enrile led the 1986 People Power Revolution which deposed Marcos he claimed the latter event was staged, but he retracted the claim in his 2012 memoir.

The MV Karagatan incident was followed by another arms trafficking attempt. The NPA procured another ship called the MV Andrea. However the ship sank in the South China Sea on its way to Sanya Naval Base in Hainan, where the crew was to load hundreds of firearms concealed inside plastic tubes.

China and the Philippines formally established diplomatic relations on June 9, 1975, which marked the end of Chinese support for the NPA.

== In popular culture ==
The MV Karagatan incident was the subject of the 2012 documentary "Ang Pagbabalik sa Karagatan" (transl. "The Return to the Ocean") by Howie Severino, which was aired on GMA Network's IWitness. In the documentary, a crew led by Severino along with former NPA commander Victor Corpus went to Digoyo Point to visit the shipwreck of MV Karagatan.
