= Manila Hotel =

Historical five-star hotel in the City of Manila

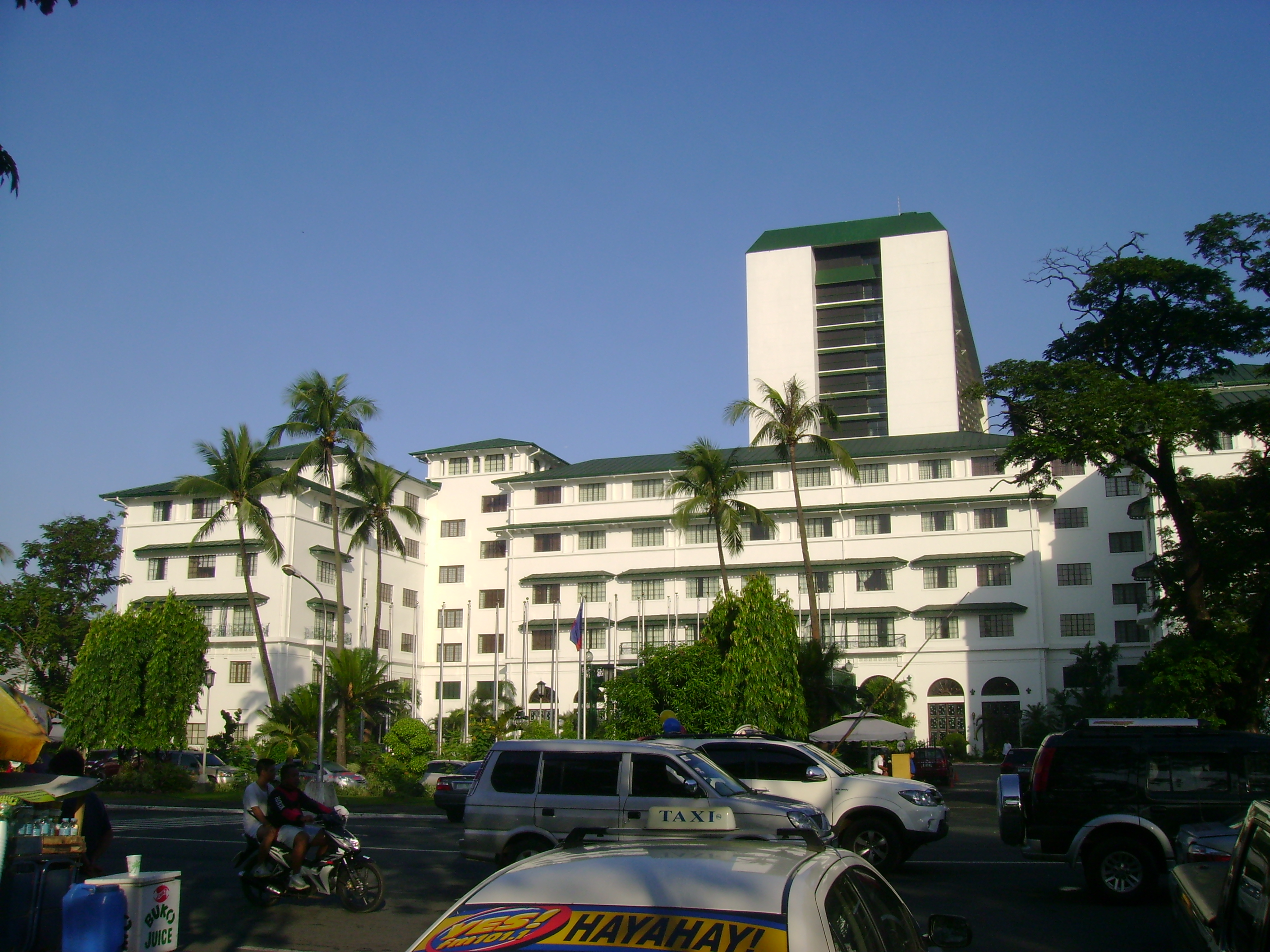
- Manila Hotel in 2012

- Location within Manila

General information
- Architectural style: California mission
- Location: Manila, Philippines, One Rizal Park
- Coordinates: 14°35′0″N 120°58′26″E
- Opening: July 4, 1912; 114 years ago
- Renovated: 1935, 1975, 2008
- Owner: Emilio Yap
- Operator: Manila Prince Hotel Corp.

Technical details
- Floor area: 35,000 m^{2} (380,000 sq ft)

Design and construction
- Architect: William E. Parsons

Renovating team
- Architect: Andrés Luna de San Pedro
- Engineer: Pedro Siochi y Angeles

Other information
- Number of rooms: 149 (1912); 570 (current)
- Number of suites: 7
- Number of restaurants: 3
- Number of bars: 4

Website
- manila-hotel.com.ph

National Historical Landmarks
- Official name: Manila Hotel
- Type: Hotel
- Designated: March 31, 2003; 23 years ago
- Legal basis: No. 1, s. 2003
- Region: National Capital Region
- Marker date: June 19, 2002; 24 years ago

The Manila Hotel is a 550-room, historic five-star hotel located along Manila Bay in Manila, Philippines. The hotel is the oldest premiere hotel in the Philippines built in 1909 to rival Malacañang Palace, the official residence of the President of the Philippines. It was opened on the commemoration of American Independence on July 4, 1912. The hotel complex was built on a reclaimed area of 35,000 square metres (380,000 sq ft) at the northwestern end of Rizal Park along Bonifacio Drive in Ermita. Its penthouse served as the residence of General Douglas MacArthur during his tenure as the Military Advisor of the Philippine Commonwealth from 1935 to 1941.

The hotel used to host the offices of several foreign news organizations, including The New York Times. It has hosted world leaders and celebrities, including authors Ernest Hemingway and James A. Michener; actors Douglas Fairbanks Jr. and John Wayne; publisher Henry Luce; entertainers Sammy Davis Jr., Michael Jackson and The Beatles; Charles, Prince of Wales (now King Charles III); and U.S. President Bill Clinton.

The hotel tower, built as part of the hotel's renovation and expansion from 1975 to 1977, is the tallest hotel tower in the Manila Bay area.

== History ==
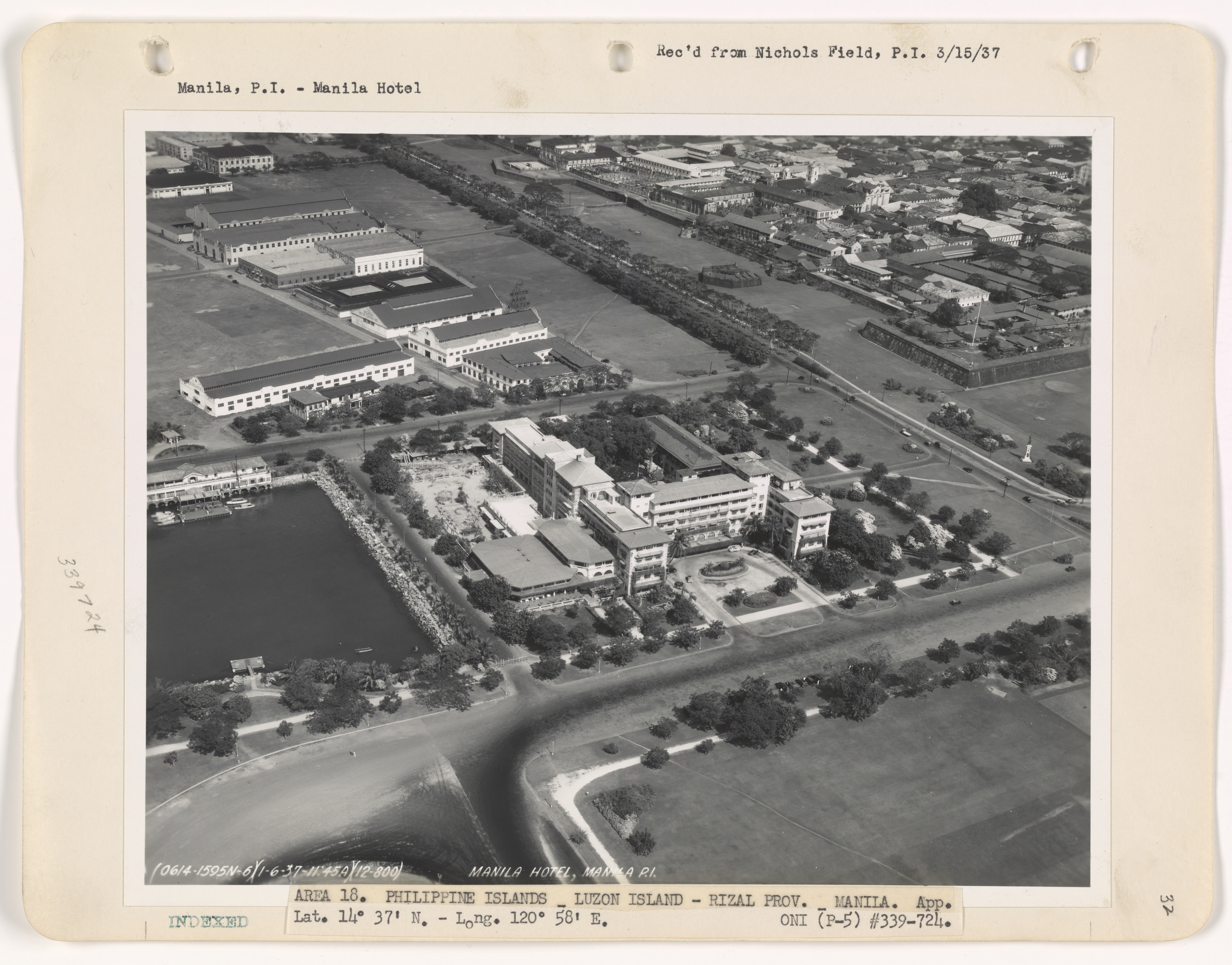
Aerial view of Manila Hotel, 1937

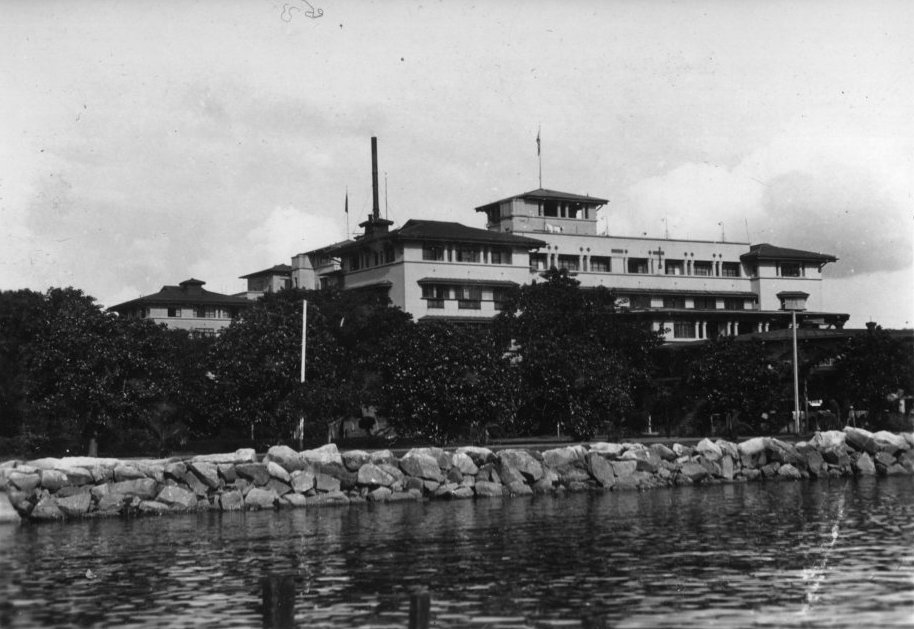
The Manila Hotel prior its expansion into a high-rise building.

The original design was an H-shaped plan that focused on well-ventilated rooms on two wings, providing grand vistas of the harbor, the Luneta, and Intramuros. The top floor was, in fact, a large viewing deck that was used for various functions, including watching the American navy steam into the harbor.

The hotel was finished construction in 1912 and opened on July 4, 1912, to commemorate American Independence Day. A commemorative tablet was placed in the corner of the left wing by the United States Secretary of War, Jacob M. Dickinson, on September 1, 1910. The hotel was owned by private individuals and firms until 1919 when the Insular Government purchased all outstanding shares and put the Manila Hotel Company under the Manila Railroad Company.

=== First renovation ===
During the start of the Philippine Commonwealth in 1935, President Manuel Quezon hired Paris-trained Filipino architect Andres P. Luna, son of painter Juan Luna to take charge of the ₱1,000,000 renovation of the Manila Hotel, equivalent to $10,000,000 in 2020 USD. It was done under the supervision of the renowned engineering firm Pedro Siochi and Company. The hotel was the residence of General Douglas MacArthur when he became the Military Advisor of the Commonwealth. Luna converted the hotel's top floor into an elegant penthouse and expanded the west wing northward – creating the air-conditioned annex - and designed some key public rooms like the Fiesta Pavilion, then the biggest function room of the hotel. The hotel was the site of festivities during the inauguration of the Commonwealth in November 1935. Throughout 1936, the hotel profited from the mining boom with annual revenue increasing 7.6% and business increasing two to sixfold in the slack period of April–September, breaking its trend of only breaking even or ending the year in a loss. In the late 1930's the hotel was advertised as the Aristocrat of the Orient.

=== World War II ===
During World War II, the hotel was occupied by Japanese troops, and the Japanese flag was flown above the walls for the entirety of the war. During the Battle for the Liberation of Manila, the hotel was set on fire by the Japanese. The shell of the building survived the blaze and the structure was later reconstructed.

=== Marcos years ===
During the presidency of Ferdinand Marcos, in accordance with Presidential Decree no. 645 in 1975, the old Manila Hotel Company was liquidated and the government took over its ownership. The Government Service Insurance System (GSIS) was given the mandate to form a new subsidiary corporation that would restore, renovate, and expand the Manila Hotel. Throughout Marcos' two-decade presidency, Marcos's wife, Imelda, was frequently seen at the hotel restaurants. During her visits, a red carpet and garlands were put out and the air was sprayed with deodorant. Under Imelda's patronage, the hotel reaped international recognition and awards. It was the place to go and be seen during the Martial Law years.

==== 1975 renovation ====
Manila Hotel's 1975 high-rise building as seen from Quirino Grandstand.

The hotel was remodeled in 1975 and expanded to 570 rooms with the addition of the high-rise hotel building behind the original five-story structure. The renovations were headed by National Artists for Architecture Leandro Locsin and Ildefonso Santos with Patricia Keller, a partner in the international interior design firm of Dale Keller & Associates. Guest amenities were updated including executive services, language translation, a business library, and color television and closed circuit movies. The hotel's spartan interiors in simplified Mission style gave way to more lavish furnishings. Inauguration and formal reopening ceremonies of the Manila Hotel was held on October 6, 1977.

=== Transfer of ownership ===
Around 1995, the Government Service Insurance System (GSIS) called for a bidding to sell the property. The tender went to a Malaysian firm, the Renong Berhad and ITT-Sheraton combine over Emilio Yap, a Chinese Filipino billionaire tycoon and owner of the Manila Bulletin, the country's largest newspaper by circulation. Yap went to the Supreme Court of the Philippines and won by matching Rehong's bid and citing the Constitution's Filipino First policy in the ownership of a 'national patrimony'. Fifty-one percent of the ownership was awarded to Yap's Manila Prince Hotel Corporation (MPHC), while new owners joined on April 25, 1997, as 49 percent shareholder. Yap signed a check for ₱673.2 million and the MPHC took over the property on May 7, 1997. One of the first things Yap did was to pull down the three brass chandeliers in the lobby, upon recommendation of a feng shui expert, and replace them with five.

=== Centennial ===
In 2008, the Manila Hotel underwent a series of renovations in time for its centennial celebration in 2012. All of the hotel's rooms were refurbished and renovated and equipped with modern facilities and amenities. The rooms' windows were enlarged. The hotel also opened a Health Club next to the Manila Hotel Health Spa.

On January 17, 2008, the Manila Hotel Tent City, located west of the original structure was opened. The performance/conference hall could accommodate 2,500 guests for wedding receptions, anniversaries, conventions, and exhibitions. Its high ceilings allow even the most complex of venue set-ups and design. The Tent became the center stage when the hotel celebrated its 100th anniversary with a Centennial Ball on July 4, 2012, with President Benigno Aquino III as the guest-of-honor.

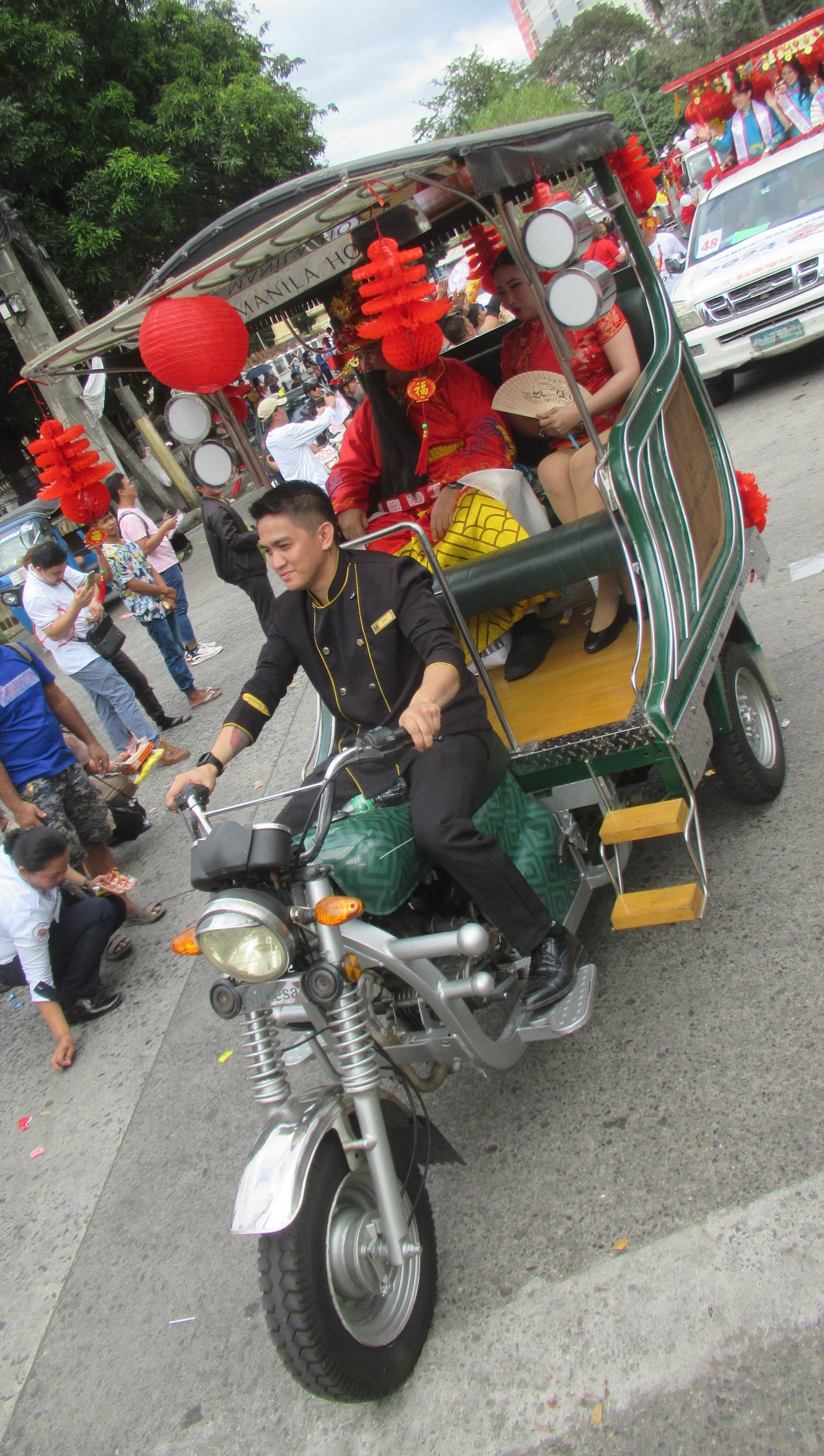
Float in Manila Chinatown Solidarity Parade 2024

== Political events ==
Through the years, Manila Hotel has been the scene of historic events in the country.

A riot between protesters and policemen occurred outside the hotel on October 24, 1966. Approximately 2,000 University of the Philippines students and members of the Lapiang Manggagawa (LM) party had moved their protest from the United States Embassy to the Manila Hotel, where US president Lyndon Johnson and other international delegates were residing in during the Manila Summit on the Vietnam War. When the protesters refused to disperse, police in riot gear responded by attacking the protesters, leading to one student's death and the injury of demonstrators and foreign journalists. The police initially arrested and charged five students in the riot, but president Marcos later ordered for the charges to be dropped by the Department of Justice. The protest has since been considered an early indication of the growing working class protest movement in the late 1960s to early 1970s.

The Philippine Constitutional Convention of 1970 was held at the Fiesta Pavilion of the hotel on November 10. The convention attended by 320 delegates was called to change the Philippine Constitution that has been in existence since the start of the Philippine Commonwealth in 1935.

The Kilusang Bagong Lipunan party of Ferdinand Marcos held its convention at the Manila Hotel before the 1986 presidential election on February 7, while Corazon C. Aquino delivered a speech at the hotel that was a turning point in her presidential campaign. Marcos was ousted on February 25 after the People Power Revolution.

On July 6, 1986, a group of military officers loyal to Marcos took over the Manila Hotel and declared Arturo Tolentino, his vice presidential running mate, as interim president. However, the coup did not last long: they surrendered two days later.

The hotel received international attention in 1999 when Imelda Marcos celebrated her 70th birthday in the hotel. More than 1,000 of Manila's elite turned up in the event.

== Features ==
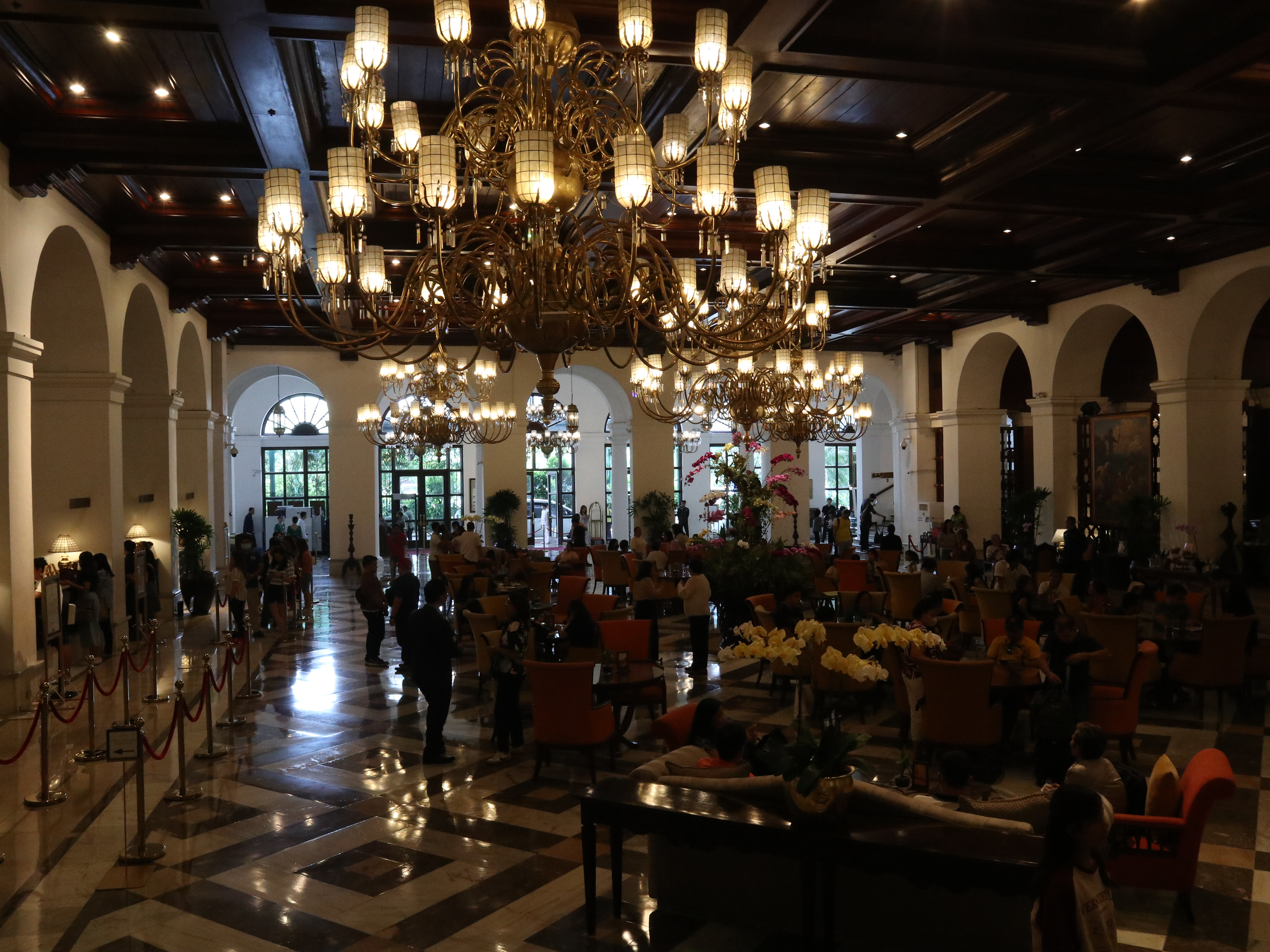
Lobby

=== Suites ===
The three-bedroom MacArthur suite was the residence of Gen. MacArthur while living in the country. The suite is located on the 5th floor of the original structure. The MacArthur, Presidential and Penthouse Suites provide 24-hour butler service.

=== Facilities and services ===
The hotel's guest facilities and other services include limousine and luxury car rental, a helipad on the roof deck, airport transfer and transport assistance, medical clinic, a Business Center with Internet access, 24-hour full menu room service and concierge, laundry service, a delicatessen, a hair salon and souvenir shops.

=== Recreation ===
The Manila Hotel Spa is located by the bay offering massages and other therapies. Guests could use the outdoor pool and the Health Club.

=== Restaurants ===
The hotel has three restaurants, three bars and a delicatessen offering a range of cuisines, from Chinese to European. These are Cafe Ilang-Ilang, Red Jade, Champagne Room, Tap Room Bar, Lobby Lounge and Pool Bar.

== See also ==
- Naval Base Manila
