= Victor Corpus =

Filipino general (1944–2024)

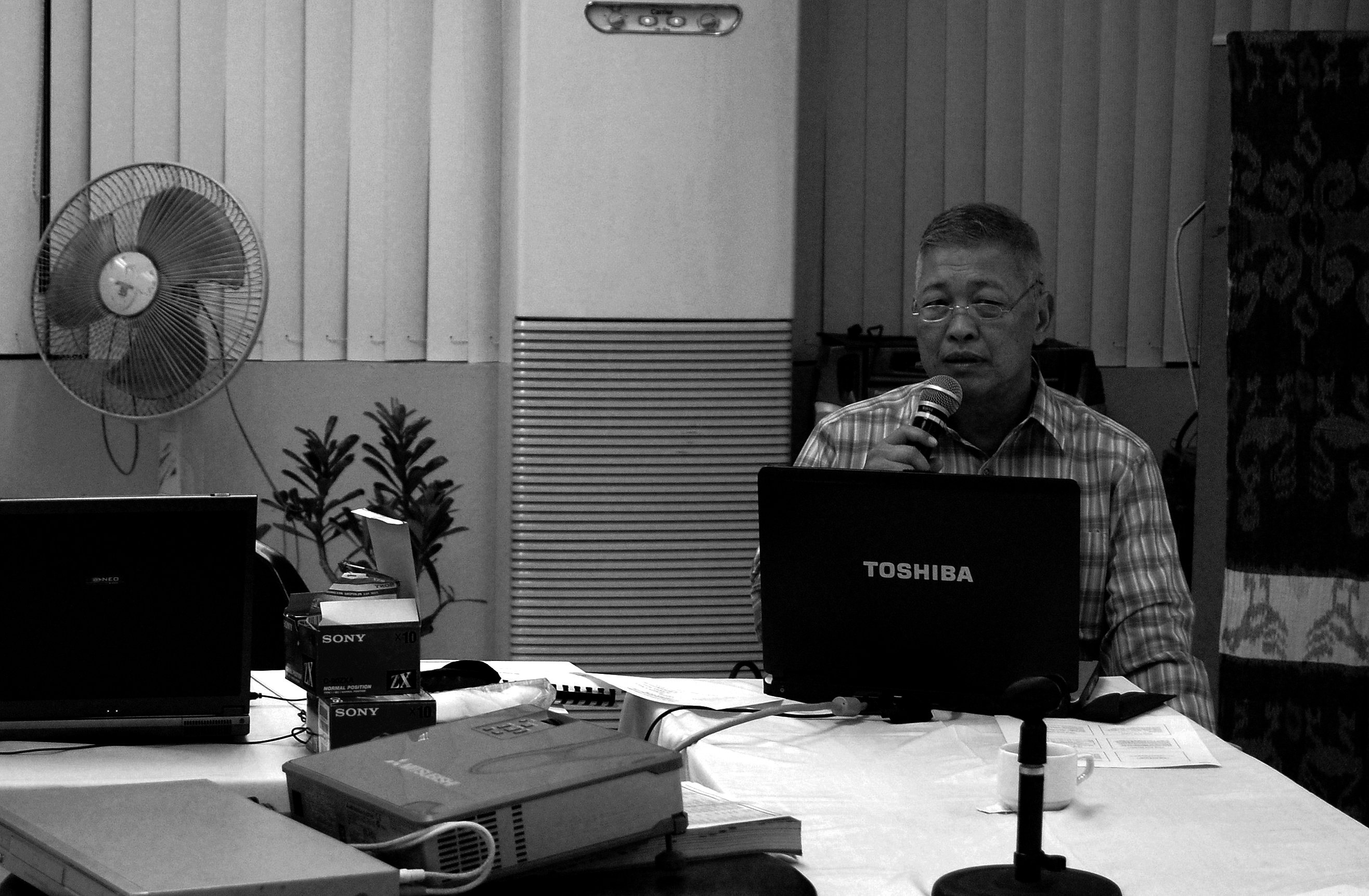
- Corpus in 2008

Personal details
- Born: Victor Navarro Corpus; October 4, 1944 San Pablo, Laguna, Philippine Commonwealth
- Died: April 4, 2024 (aged 79)
- Education: Philippine Military Academy

Military service
- Allegiance: Philippines; New People's Army
- Branch/service: Philippine Army (GRP)
- Years of service: 1967–1970; 1987–2004 (PA); 1970–1976 (NPA)
- Rank: Brigadier General (PA)
- Commands: Intelligence Service of the Armed Forces of the Philippines

Victor Navarro Corpus (October 4, 1944 – April 4, 2024) was a Filipino military officer and public official best known for his 1970 defection from the Armed Forces of the Philippines (AFP) to the New People's Army of the Communist Party of the Philippines during the authoritarian regime of Ferdinand Marcos, for his defection from the NPA in 1976, his return to the AFP after the 1986 People Power Revolution, and his later role as chief of the Intelligence Service of the Armed Forces of the Philippines (ISAFP).

A member of the Philippine Military Academy (PMA) Class of 1967, he was promoted to the rank of Brigadier General of the AFP in May 2003, and retired with that rank when he reached retirement age in October 2004.

== Early life and education ==
Corpus was born on October 4, 1944, in San Pablo, Laguna. His father was Col. Vicente Corpus of the AFP Medical Corps. He took his elementary and high school studies at De La Salle University, and then on his father's insistence, entered the Philippine Military Academy (PMA) in 1963. Corpus eventually graduated from PMA as part of the "Dimasupil" class of 1967.

== Career ==
Corpus entered the Philippine Army, where he received Airborne and Special Forces training. He later transferred to the Philippine Constabulary. Disgruntled by corruption in the armed forces, he opted for an assignment as instructor at the PMA.

=== 1970 PMA armory raid ===
On December 29, 1970, Corpus formally defected to the New People's Army (NPA) and led a raid on the PMA armory. Timing the raid when most cadets were out on Christmas vacation and the PMA's senior officers including its Superintendent, General Ugalde had left the camp to meet President Ferdinand Marcos upon his scheduled arrival in nearby Baguio.

Corpus, who was PMA's designated officer of the day (OOD), guided the NPA raiding team which managed to escape with Browning automatic rifles, carbines, machine guns, and various other weapons and ammunition.

=== MV Karagatan incident ===
Corpus oversaw the failed operations of the New People's Army to receive armaments from China in 1972. The Philippine military intercepted the weapons loaded into the ship MV Karagatan along the coast of Palanan, Isabela.

=== 1976 surrender ===
Disgruntled with the Communist Party of the Philippines, Corpus decided to surrender to government in July 14, 1976, due to disillusionment over the organization citing the 1971 Plaza Miranda bombing which the NPA is alleged to have a role in committing. He would spend the rest of the Marcos dictatorship in prison. In November 1977, he and his two co-accused, Ninoy Aquino and Bernabe Buscayno, were sentenced to death by firing squad at a military tribunal on charges of murder and subversion; Corpus and Buscayno's sentences were confirmed in May 1981, but eventually did not push through. After Marcos was deposed in the peaceful 1986 EDSA Revolution, Corpus was granted clemency by President Corazon Aquino.

=== Return to the AFP and retirement ===
During the God Save the Queen Plot against President Corazon Aquino in November 1986, the Reform the Armed Forces Movement's chief propagandist, Captain Rex Robles, leaked to the media a letter from Corpus, in which he claimed to have witnessed the CPP leadership planning the Plaza Miranda bombing in 1971, which prompted him to surrender to the government. He later reported the plot to Philippine Constabulary chief Renato de Villa, which led to its unraveling.

In 1987, Corpus was reinstated into the Armed Forces of the Philippines, with a rank of Lieutenant Colonel. On June 7, 1989, he launched his book titled Silent War at the Manila Polo Club, with then-National Defense Secretary Fidel V. Ramos in attendance. He was promoted to the rank of Brigadier General of the AFP in May 2003, and retired with that rank in October 2004. He retired four years beyond than the mandatory retirement age of 56 due to a special arrangement with the administration of President Gloria Macapagal Arroyo.

== Death ==
Corpus died on April 4, 2024, at the age of 79.

== Legacy ==
Gringo Honasan, a former Philippine Army officer who had led various coup attempts against the Corazon Aquino administration in the 1980s, was a student of Corpus in political science at the PMA, and once stated that "[Corpus] was, in fact, our class advisor. Most of the radical thinking of our class was his influence."

A biographical film about Corpus titled Operation: Get Victor Corpus, the Rebel Soldier was released in January 1987, where he is portrayed by Rudy Fernandez; it was later offered for international distributors at the 1987 Cannes Film Festival film market in May.
