= Revolutionary government in the Philippines =

A revolutionary government or provisional government has been declared a number of times in the Philippines, by various insurgent groups.

== Historical revolutionary governments ==
=== Philippine Revolution ===
The First Philippine Republic was under a revolutionary government.

A revolutionary government was initially established by the Katipunan with the outbreak of the Philippine Revolution in 1896, as the Katipunan's Supreme President Andres Bonifacio reformed its Supreme Council into a "cabinet" still with himself as president. (Prior to this, the Katipunan had itself been established in 1892 with the intention of becoming a shadow government.)

The Tejeros Convention of 1897 was held to reconcile the arguments of two factions of the Katipunan in the province of Cavite, Magdalo and Magdiwang, and it was decided that the Katipunan had to be dissolved to have an election of officers for a revolutionary government. This led to the leadership of the revolution passing to Emilio Aguinaldo, who led a succession of insurgent governments as president and briefly Dictator.

The government established at Tejeros on March 22 (but finalized and first asserted itself on April 24) was succeeded in November by the "Republic of the Philippines", which is today known as the Republic of Biak-na-Bato. That government was disestablished on December 15 by the Pact of Biak-na-Bato and Aguinaldo went into exile, establishing the Hong Kong Junta. In Aguinaldo's absence, the Central Executive Committee was temporarily established as an insurgent revolutionary government. Aguinaldo returned to the Philippines on May 19, 1898, during the Spanish–American War.

The independence of the Philippines from Spain was declared on June 12, and Aguinaldo established himself as dictator in a dictatorial government on June 18. This government was succeeded by a revolutionary government on June 23, with Aguinaldo as president. This was succeeded on January 21, 1899, by the First Philippine Republic, which included an elected legislative branch and a constitution.

=== Republic of Negros ===
The Republic of Negros (Hiligaynon: Republika sang Negros; Cebuano: Republika sa Negros; Spanish: República de Negros) was initially established on November 27, 1898, during the Spanish–American War, as a short-lived cantonal revolutionary republic seated in Bacolod, Negros island. On November 5, 1898, Spanish officials surrendered themselves to local Visayan leaders and a provisional government was established. The Federal Republic of Negros was established on January 1, 1899, and a notice of this was sent to Emilio Aguinaldo in Luzon. Negros Island came under U.S. protection on April 30, 1899, as a separate state from the rest of the Philippine Islands. A constitution which proposed two governors, a U.S. military governor and a civil governor elected by the voters of Negros, was framed by a committee sitting in Bacolod and sent to General Otis in Manila and was proclaimed to take effect on July 22, 1899. Elections were held on October 2, reconstituting the republic. It operated smoothly until the province of Occidental Negros was established on April 20, 1901, and annexed to the Philippine Islands by the United States as the Republic of Negros.

=== Tagalog Republic ===
Tagalog Republic (Filipino: Republika ng Katagalugan) is a term used to refer to two revolutionary governments involved in the Philippine Revolution against Spain and the Philippine–American War, one in 1896–1897 by Andrés Bonifacio and the other in 1902–1906 by Macario Sakay, who viewed it as a continuation of the former. Both were connected to the Katipunan revolutionary movement.

=== Republic of Zamboanga ===
The Republic of Zamboanga was a short-lived sovereign republic, founded on February 28, 1899, by General Vicente Alvarez with his Zamboangueño Revolutionary Forces after the Spanish government in Zamboanga officially surrendered and turned over Fort Pilar to Gen. Vicente Álvarez in May 1899. Gen. Vicente Álvarez proclaimed independence and became the first and last genuinely elected president of the republic. Alverez's cohort, Datu Mandi, flew the white flag over Fort Pilar on November 16, 1899, to signal American forces occupying the Philippines to enter the fort which led to the overthrow of Álvarez's government. Thereafter, the nascent republic became a U.S. protectorate or puppet government and Midel as puppet leader of U.S. was allowed to continue as president of the republic for about sixteen months.

=== Bangsamoro Republik ===
The Bangsamoro Republik, officially the United Federated States of Bangsamoro Republik, was a short-lived, self-proclaimed, unrecognized breakaway state in the Philippines. Nur Misuari, chairman of the Moro National Liberation Front, issued the Proclamation of Bangsamoro Independence on July 27, 2013, in Talipao, Sulu, and declared the capital of Bangsamoro to be Davao City.

=== Aquino administration ===
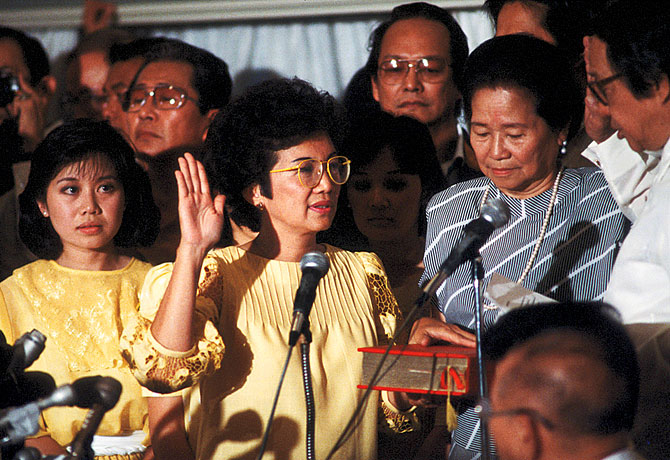
President Corazon Aquino declared a revolutionary government following the People Power Revolution in 1986.

Following the fall of the authoritarian administration of President Ferdinand Marcos, the Philippines was praised worldwide in 1986, when the so-called bloodless revolution erupted, called the EDSA People Power Revolution. Due to the People Power Revolution of February 1986, Marcos' successor, President Corazon Aquino, established a revolutionary government with the signing of the "Freedom Constitution" by the virtue of Proclamation No. 3, which established human rights as the core of Philippine democracy.

== List ==
- Katipunan-based revolutionary government of the Sovereign Tagalog Nation, also known as the Tagalog Republic, August 24, 1896 – March 22, 1897 (Note: Or May 10, 1897, with the death of Bonifacio who did not recognize the succeeding Tejeros government.)
- Republic of the Philippines, also known as the Government of the (Entire) Tagalog Nation, March 22, 1897 (Note: Or April 24, 1897, when the Tejeros government was finalized and consolidated and openly declared itself. Aguinaldo took his oath of office on March 23 but did not assume office openly until then, only after securing his support among Magdalo and Magdiwang alike.) – November 1, 1897
- Republic of the Philippines, November 1, 1897 – December 14, 1897
- Central Executive Committee, April 17, 1898 – shortly after May 19, 1898
- Dictatorial Government of the Philippines, May 19 – June 23, 1898
- Revolutionary Government of the Philippines, June 23, 1898 – January 21, 1899
- Philippine Republic, called today the "First" Philippine Republic, January 22, 1899 – uncertain (Note: The effective dissolution date of the First Philippine Republic government is not well defined: On March 23, 1901, United States forces captured Emilio Aguinaldo, President of that government.; On April 1, 1901, Aguinaldo swore an oath accepting the authority of the United States over the Philippines and pledging his allegiance to the American government.; On April 19, 1901, Aguinaldo issued a Proclamation of Formal Surrender to the United States.; On July 4, 1902, United States president Theodore Roosevelt proclaimed an amnesty to those who had participated in the conflict.; On April 9, 2002, Philippine president Gloria Macapagal Arroyo proclaimed that the Philippine–American War had ended on April 16, 1902, with the surrender of General Miguel Malvar.)
  - Cantonal Republic of Negros, November 27, 1898 – July 22, 1899
  - Republic of Zamboanga, May 1899 – March 1903
  - Republic of Negros, July 22, 1899 – April 30, 1901
- Tagalog Republic, May 6, 1902 – July 14, 1906
- Provisional Government of the Philippines, March 25, 1986 – February 2, 1987

== Proposed revolutionary governments ==
=== Duterte administration ===
On October 13, 2017, President Rodrigo Duterte threatened the opposition that he would declare a de facto authoritarian government through a revolutionary government that would hinder liberalism in the Philippines. With his statement in his speech, "I have enough problems with criminality, drugs, rebellion and all, but if you push me to the extreme, I will declare the suspension of the writ of habeas corpus and I will arrest all of you," his threat drew concerns to democracy and human rights advocates. "If he declares a revolutionary government does this mean that he is abandoning his oath?", Vice President Leni Robredo's statement after hearing the threat of Duterte. "Declaring a revolutionary government is against the constitution and as an elected leader, he promised to protect the 1987 Constitution," she further added. Duterte was also criticized when he cited the revolutionary government of Corazon Aquino, experts disagree with his citing of Aquino's People Power Revolution as the 1986 revolution was initiated by the people of the Philippines, and not by an incumbent president. Wendell Phillips, an American abolitionist, advocate for Native Americans, orator, and attorney, as early as 19th century, already wrote: "revolutions are not made, they come". It is not something that can be easily declared or proclaimed. For the president to proclaim it, there must be a revolution. The opposition criticized Duterte's statements, stating that his revolutionary government will be another martial law age in the Philippines.

He has threatened communist rebels of arrest and a full-scale war against the New People's Army once a revolutionary government that would last until the end of his term was declared. Though by November 2017, Duterte has dropped the idea saying that he does not need to declare a revolutionary government in order to arrest communist rebels.

==== Possible effects of declaring a revolutionary government ====
A December 2017 Social Weather Stations survey reported that 39% of Filipinos disagreed with the prospective of declaring a revolutionary government. The Manila Times reported a survey result which observed that revolutions dismantle the state, inflict physical and structural violence on institutions and people, and overthrow the Constitution. The article observed that a coup initiated against a sitting government could lead to the rule of a junta-like body named as a revolutionary government.

== Bibliography ==
- Borromeo, Soledad Masangkay; Borromeo-Buehler, Soledad (1998), The Cry of Balintawak: A Contrived Controversy: A Textual Analysis with Appended Documents, Ateneo de Manila University Press, ISBN 978-971-550-278-8.
- Constantino, Renato (1975), The Philippines: A Past Revisited, ISBN 971-8958-00-2.
- Halili, Christine N; Halili, Maria Christine (2004), Philippine History, Rex Bookstore, ISBN 978-971-23-3934-9.
