= Francisco Makabulos =

Filipino revolutionary general

Francisco Macabulos

President of the Central Executive Committee
- In office April 17, 1898 – May 19, 1898
- Preceded by: Position established
- Succeeded by: Emilio Aguinaldo (as Leader of the Dictatorial Government)

1st Governor of Tarlac
- In office 1898–1900
- Preceded by: Position established
- Succeeded by: Alfonso Ramos

Mayor of La Paz
- In office 1900–1902
- Succeeded by: Mariano Ignacio

Member of the Malolos Congress from Cebu
- In office September 15, 1898 – March 23, 1901 Serving with Ariston Bautista, Trinidad Pardo de Tavera, and Felix David

Personal details
- Born: Francisco Macabulos y Soliman; September 17, 1871 La Paz, Tarlac, Captaincy General of the Philippines, Spanish Empire
- Died: April 20, 1922 (aged 50) Tarlac, Philippine Islands

Military service
- Allegiance: First Philippine Republic; Republic of Biak-na-Bato; Katipunan (Magdalo)
- Branch/service: Philippine Revolutionary Army
- Years of service: 1896–1899
- Rank: Major General
- Battles/wars: Philippine Revolution; Philippine–American War

Francisco Macabulos y Soliman (September 17, 1871 – April 20, 1922), commonly known today as Francisco Makabulos, was a Filipino patriot and revolutionary general who led the Katipunan revolutionary forces during the Philippine Revolution against Spain in 1896.

== Biography ==
Francisco Macabulos was born in La Paz, Tarlac, to Alejandro Macabulos of Lubao, Pampanga, and Gregoria Soliman. Within his lifetime, his native surname was often spelled with a C instead of K following Spanish orthography, but later linguistic reforms leading to the Philippine national language of Filipino means it is commonly spelled with a K today.

He organized the first Katipunan group there after he was inducted into the secret society by Ladislao Diwa in 1896. When the revolution broke out in 1898, he liberated Tarlac and established town councils in areas he liberated.

Macabulos refused to honor the Pact of Biak-na-Bato, which called for a truce with the Spanish colonial government, and continued operations in Central Luzon. However, on January 14, 1898, he disbanded his troops and accepted amnesty after receiving 14,000 pesos as part of Spanish reparations to Filipino revolutionaries. Macabulos distributed the money to his men.

Nonetheless, Macabulos resumed operations against the Spanish and on April 17, 1898, an assembly of citizens representing the town councils Macabulos established, calling themselves representatives of Central Luzon, met and drafted a provisional constitution. They created the Central Executive Committee, a government that was to exist "until a general government of the Republic in these islands shall again be established", consisting of a president, vice president, secretary of interior, secretary of war and a secretary of the treasury.

Macabulos dissolved his government after the First Philippine Republic was created by the Malolos Constitution, which he also signed. He also led his men to liberate nearby provinces like Pangasinan, where he led revolutionists in the Battle of Dagupan.

== Images ==
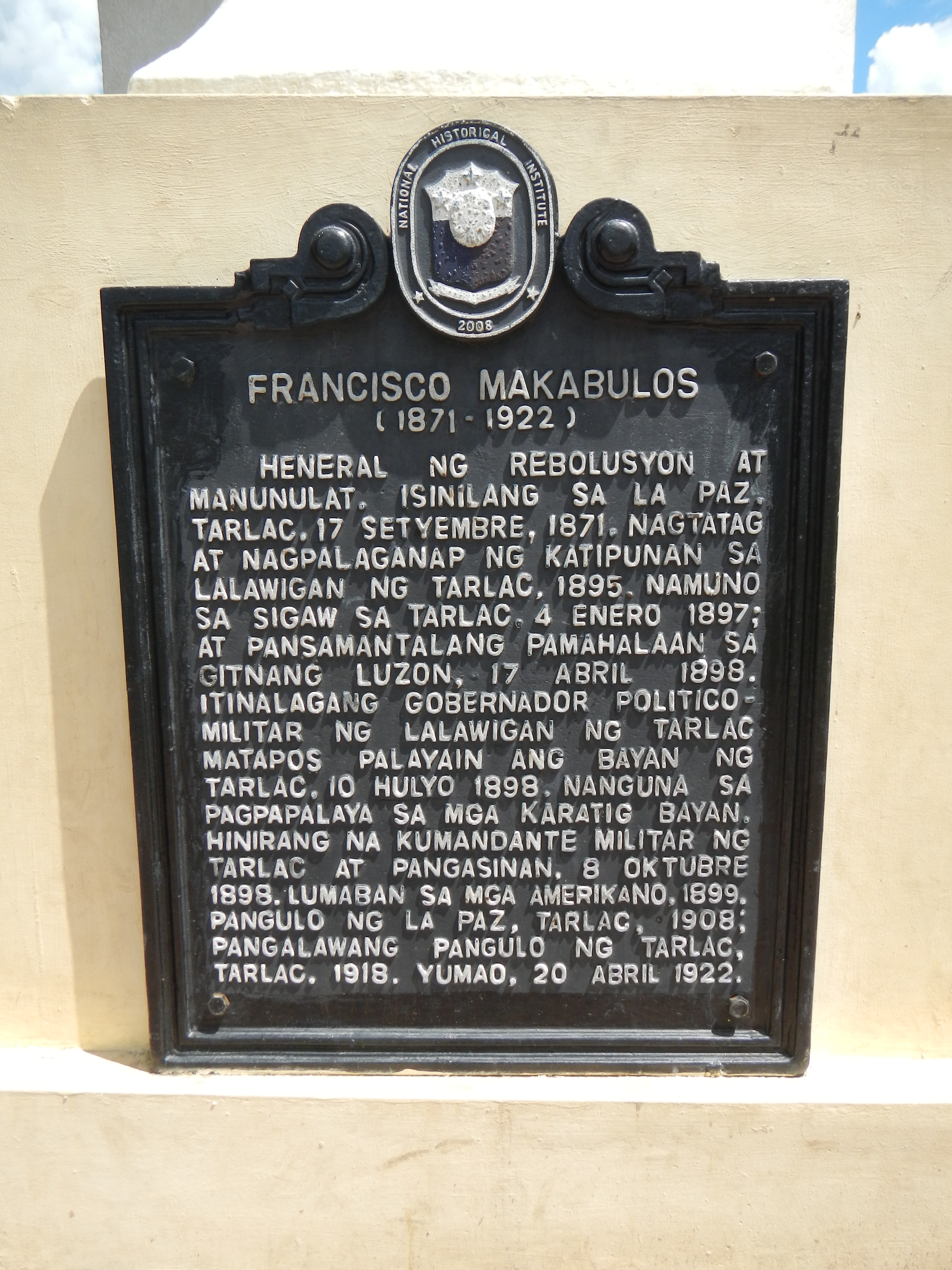
Marker

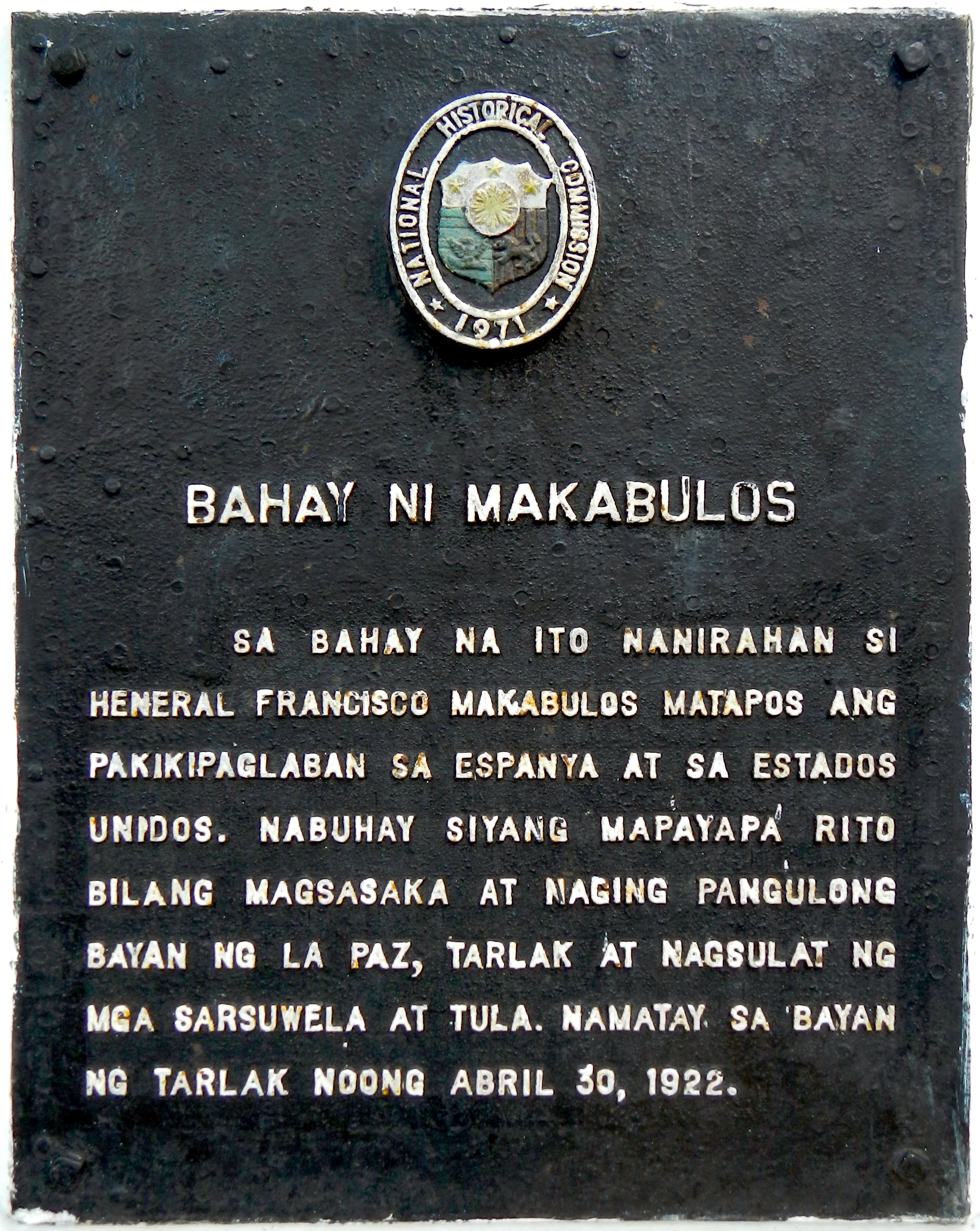
Historical marker

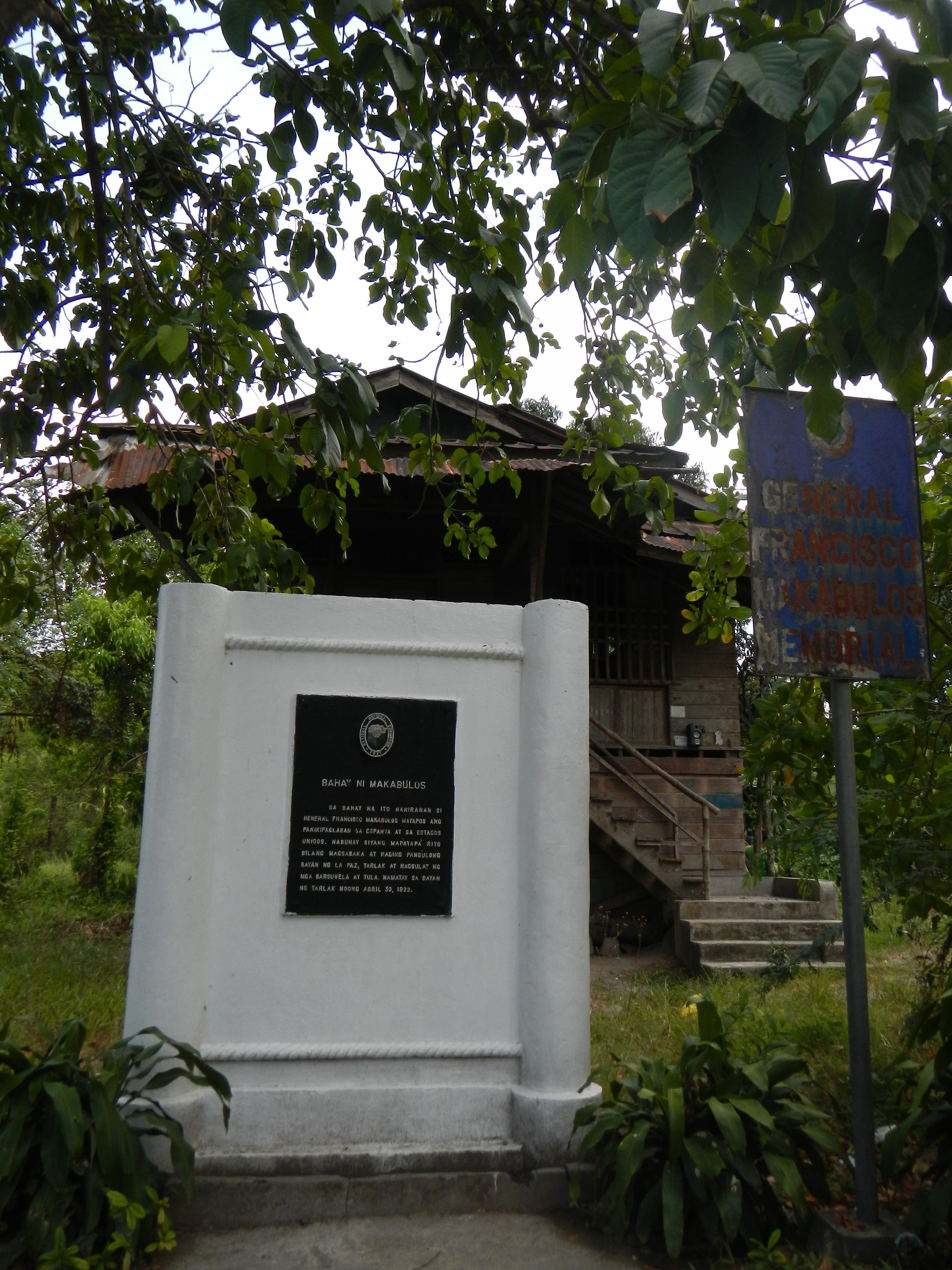
Historical marker

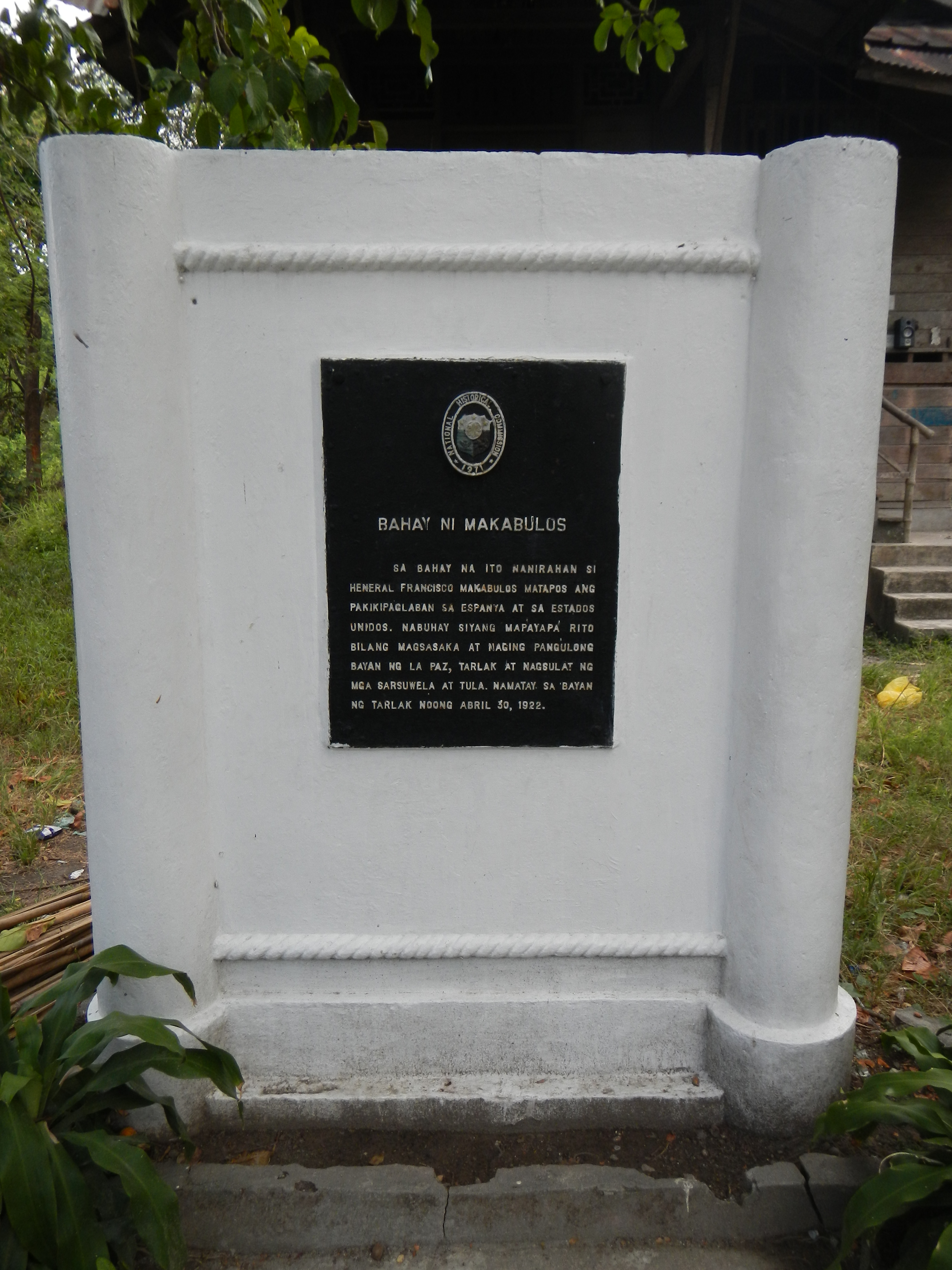
Historical marker close-up

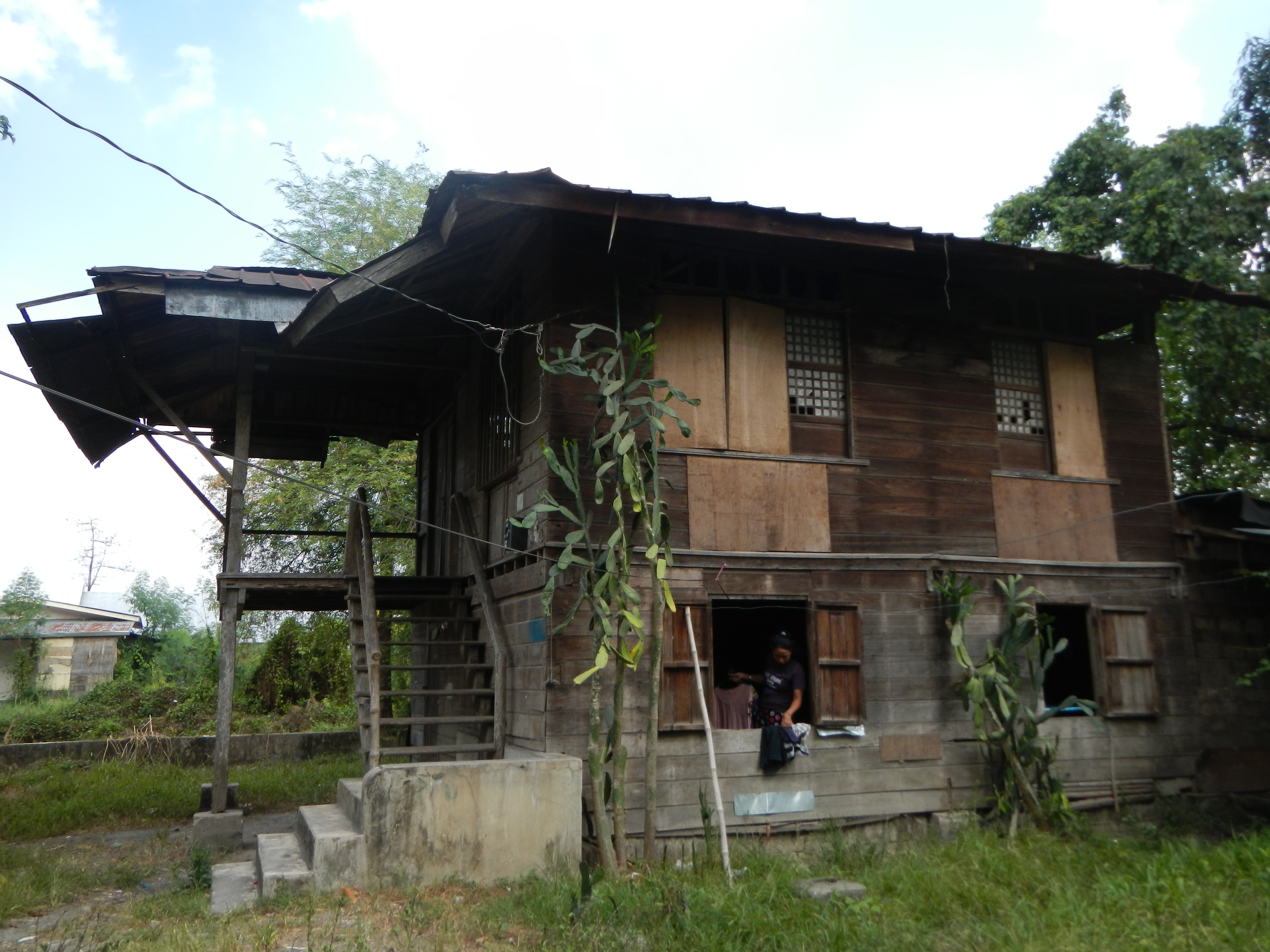
Façade of the ancestral house of Makabulos (La Paz, Tarlac)

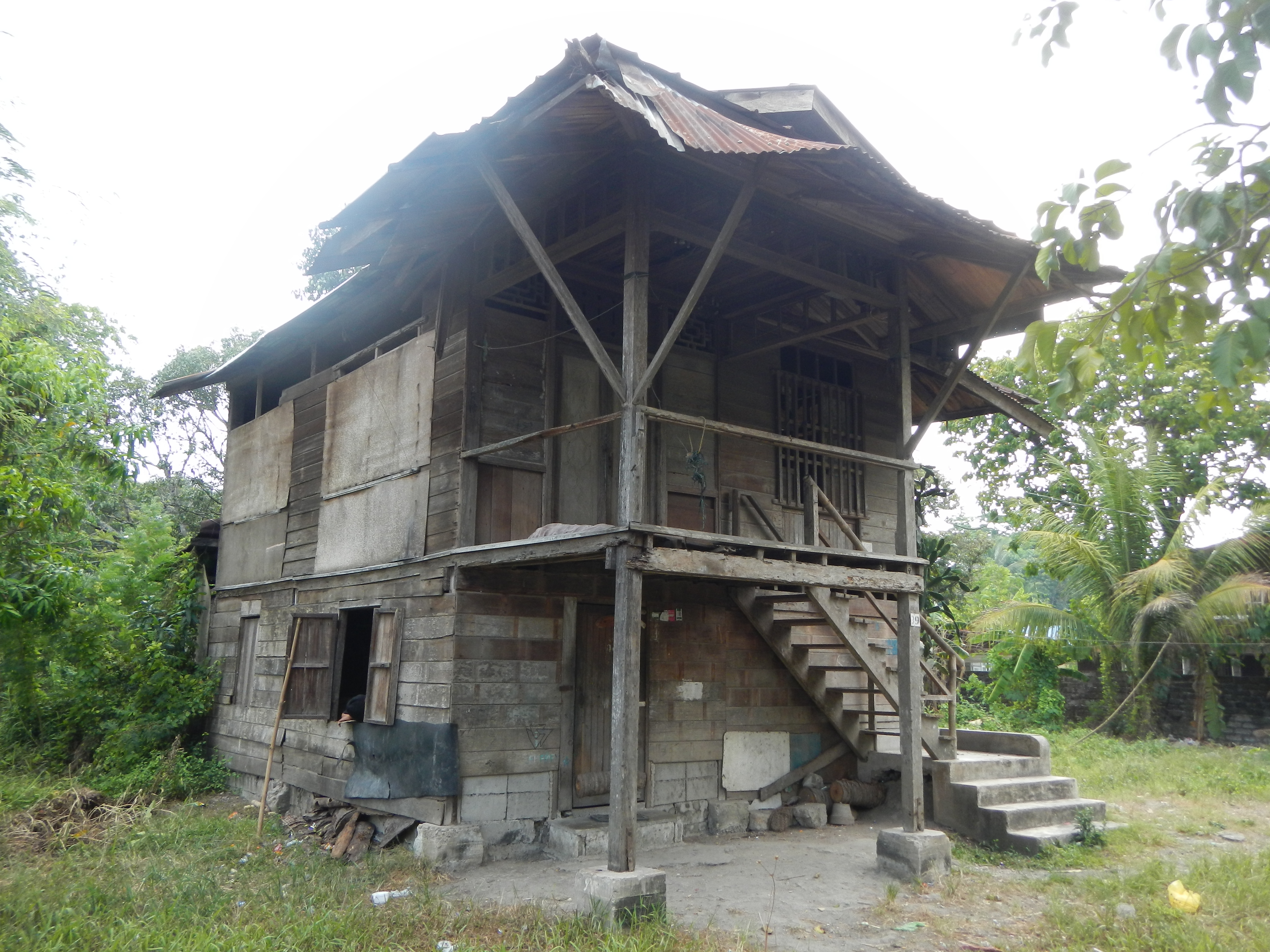
The heritage house, still to be restored

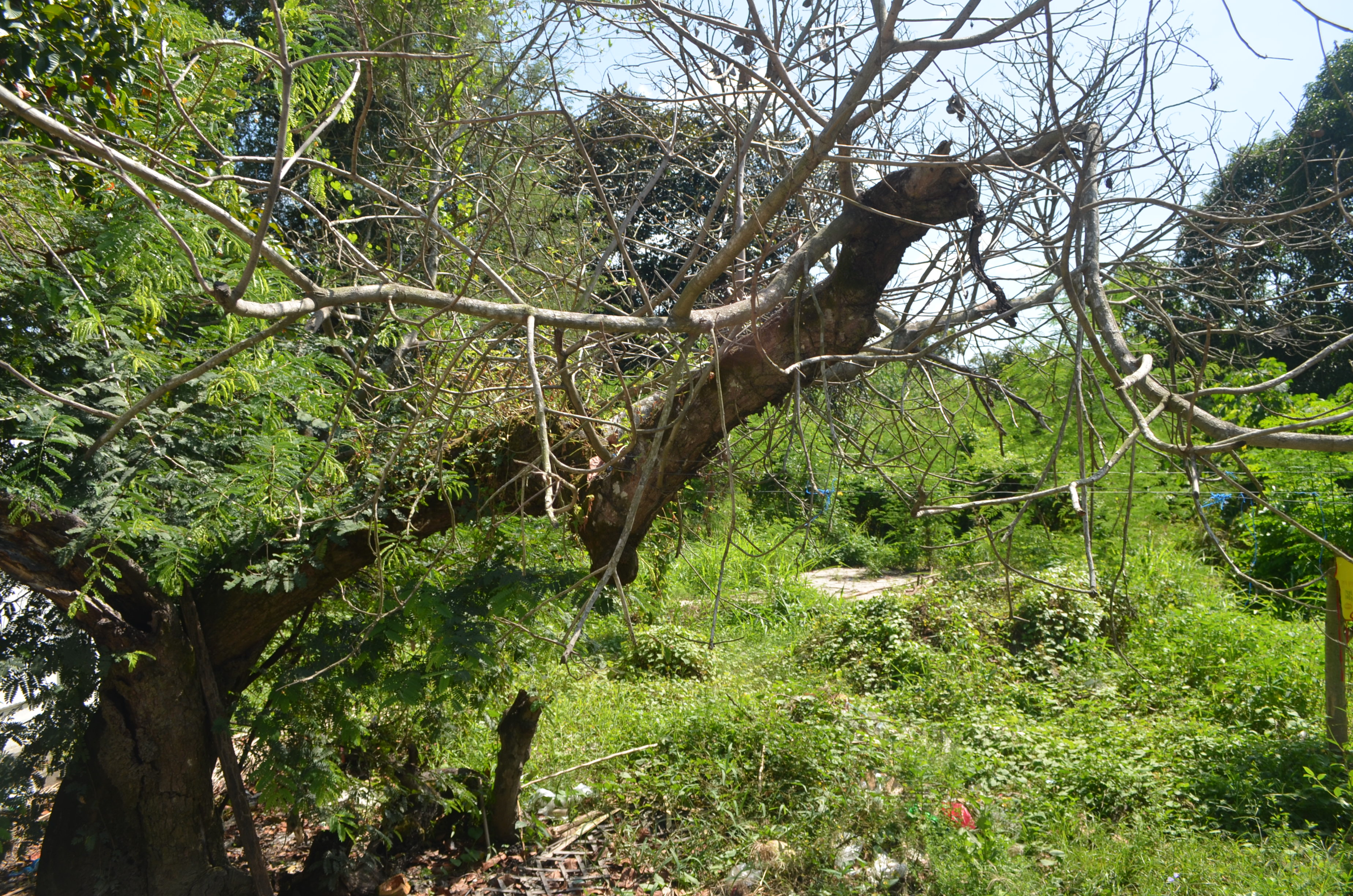
Heritage house site as of 2018. Structure completely demolished.

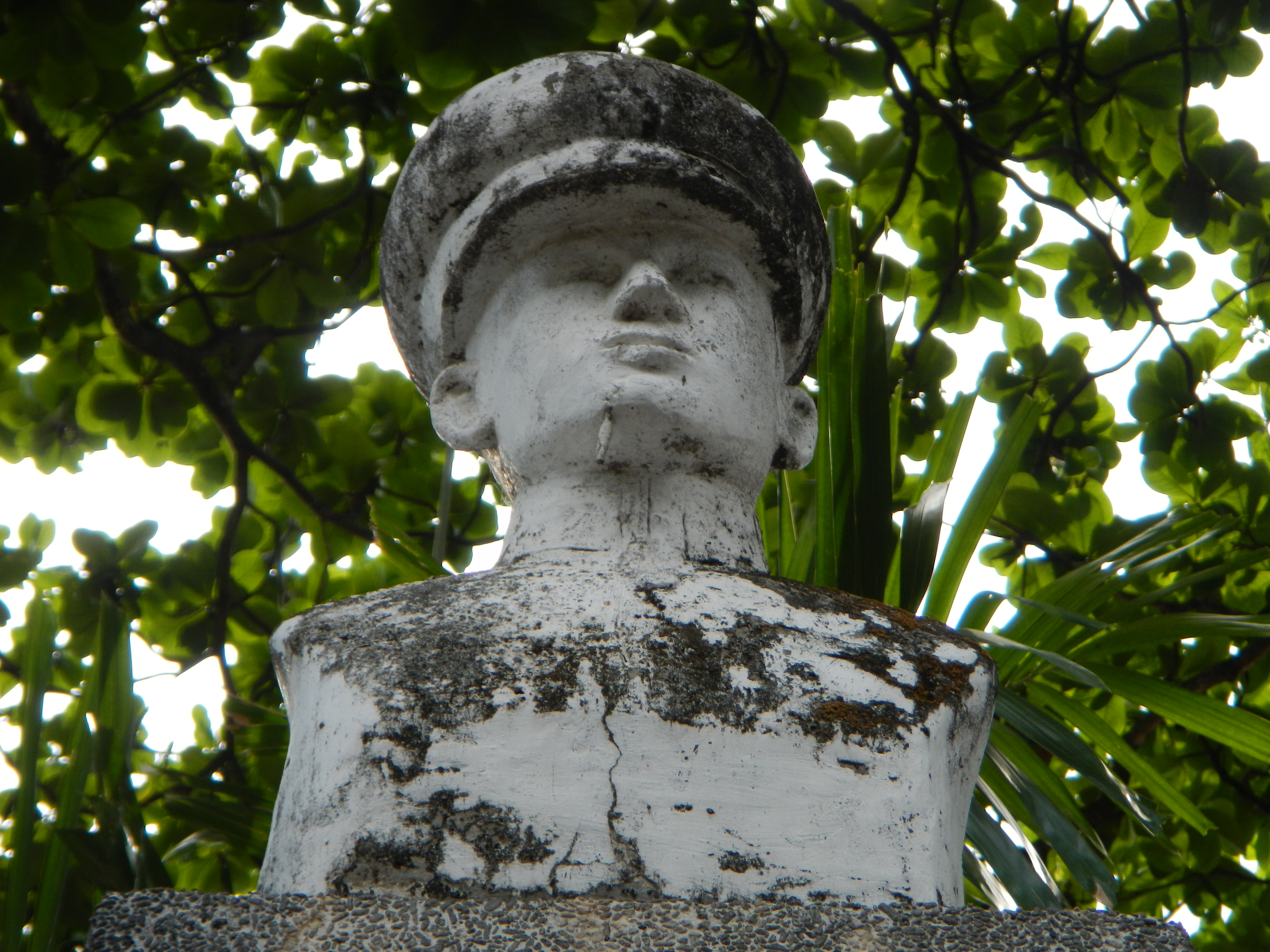
Bust

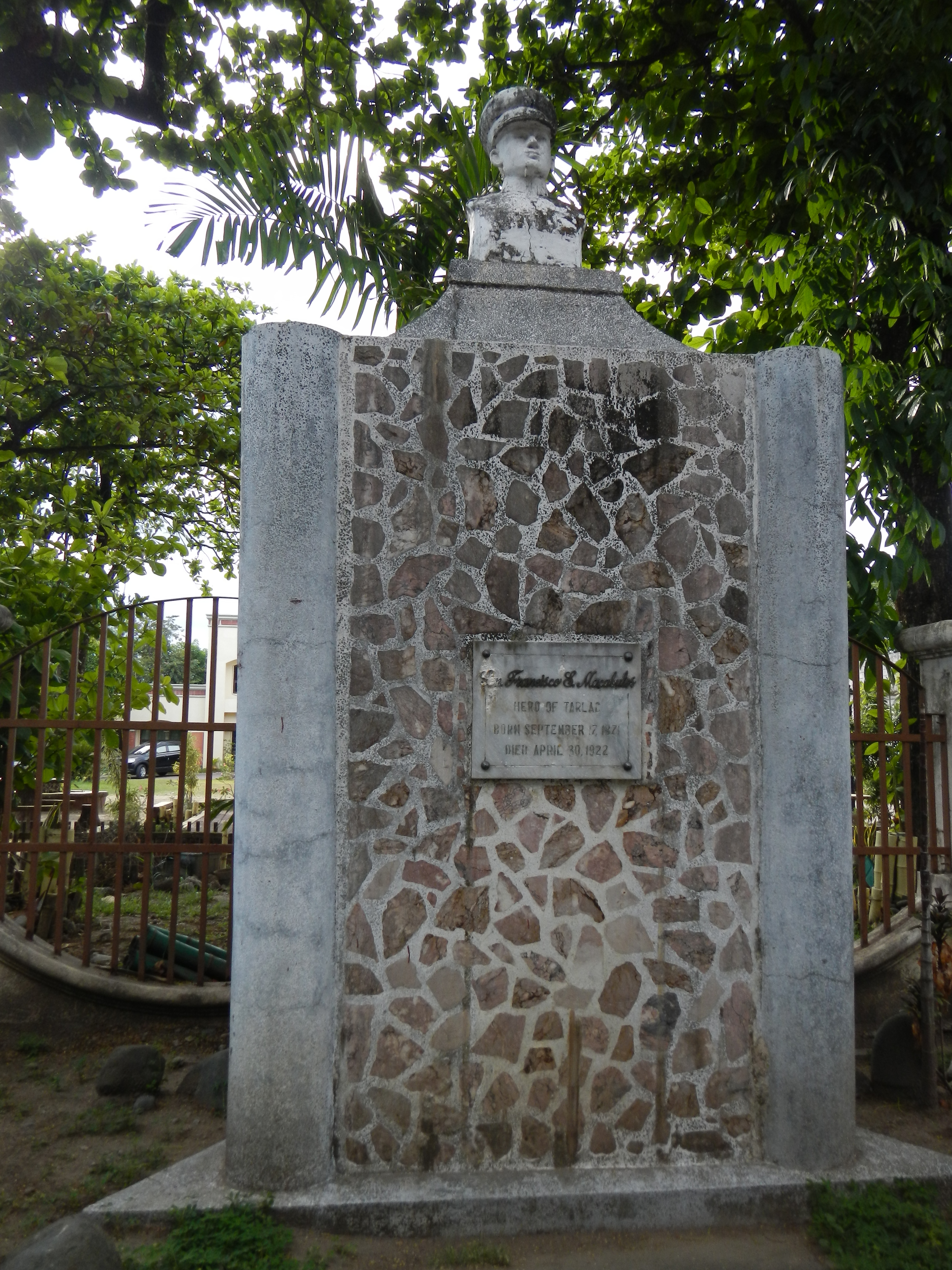
Monument (Santa Ignacia, Tarlac)

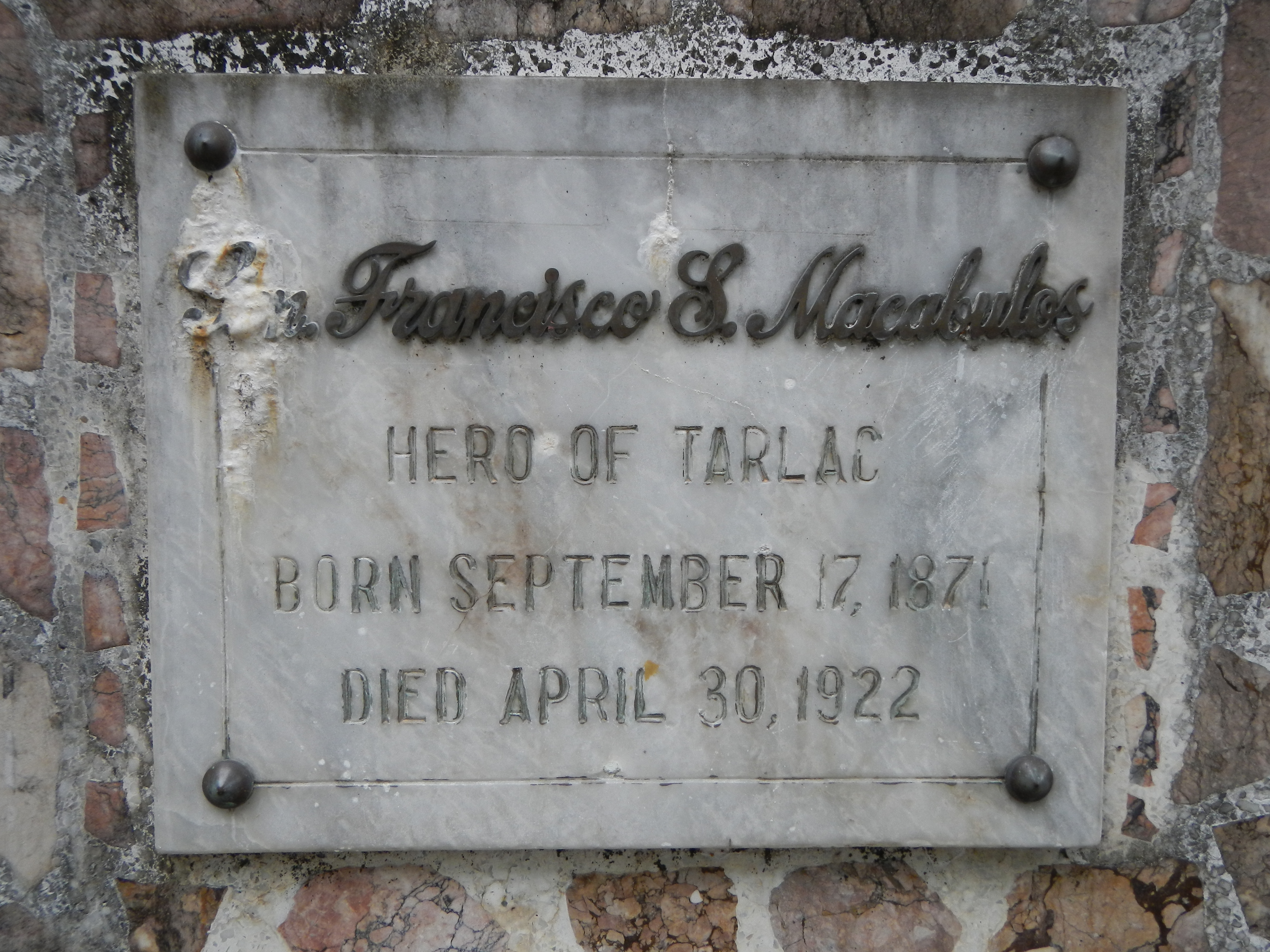
Name plate

Government offices
Preceded by Spanish Governor	Military Governor of Tarlac Province; 1898 – 1900	Succeeded by Alfonso Ramos
Political offices
Preceded by Mariano Ignacio	Mayor of La Paz, Tarlac; 1901	Succeeded by
