= La Paz, Tarlac =

Municipality in the Philippines

La Paz
- Municipality
- Municipality of La Paz
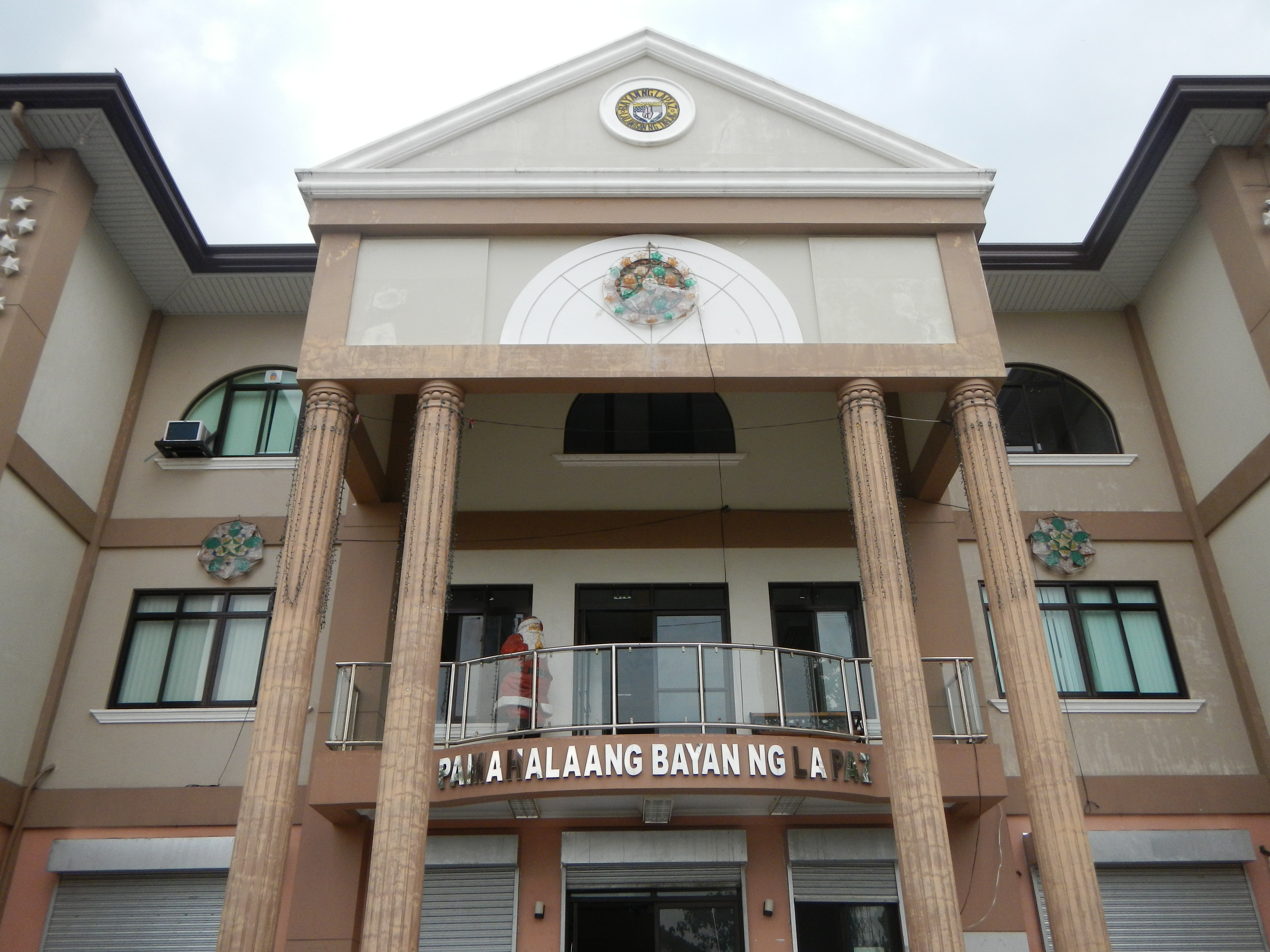
- Municipal Hall

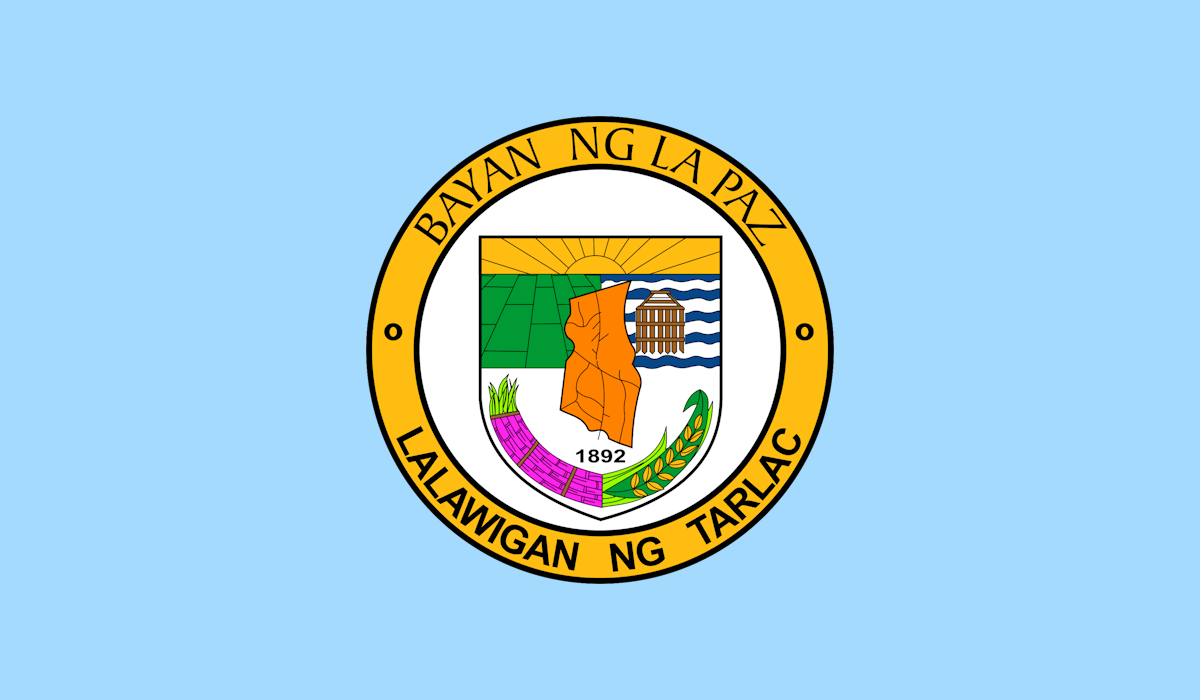
- Flag Seal
- Motto: Alpas Lapaz
- Anthem: Awit ng Lapaz (De Facto)
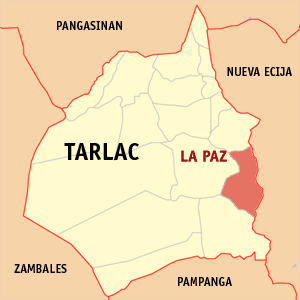
- Map of Tarlac with La Paz highlighted
- Interactive map of La Paz
- Location within the Philippines
- Coordinates: 15°26′35″N 120°43′44″E
- Country: Philippines
- Region: Central Luzon
- Province: Tarlac
- District: 3rd district
- Founded: January 24, 1892
- Barangays: 21 (see Barangays)

Government
  - Type: Sangguniang Bayan
  - Mayor: Venustiano D. Jordan
  - Vice Mayor: Lorna R. Manalo
  - Representative: Noel L. Villanueva
  - Electorate: 45,521 voters (2025)

Area
  - Total: 114.33 km^{2} (44.14 sq mi)
- Elevation: 21 m (69 ft)
- Highest elevation: 35 m (115 ft)
- Lowest elevation: 14 m (46 ft)

Population (2024 census)
  - Total: 71,978
  - Density: 629.56/km^{2} (1,630.6/sq mi)
  - Households: 16,031

Economy
  - Income class: 1st municipal income class
  - Poverty incidence: 14.82% (2023)
  - Revenue: ₱ 288.1 million (2024)
  - Assets: ₱ 661.7 million (2024)
  - Expenditure: ₱ 261.5 million (2024)
  - Liabilities: ₱ 96.18 million (2024)

Service provider
  - Electricity: Tarlac 2 Electric Cooperative (TARELCO 2)
- Time zone: UTC+8 (PST)
- ZIP code: 2314
- PSGC: 0306907000
- IDD : area code: +63 (0)45
- Native languages: Kapampangan; Tagalog; Ilocano

La Paz, officially the Municipality of La Paz (Kapampangan: Balen ning La Paz; Ilocano: Ili ti La Paz, Tagalog: Bayan ng La Paz), is a municipality in the province of Tarlac, Philippines. According to the 2024 census, it has a population of 71,978 people.

== History ==
The early history of La Paz needs to be clarified. Legends state that an old pueblo called "Cama Juan" was situated along the bank of the Chico River, bordering the province of Tarlac and Nueva Ecija. When the Chico River overflowed during a storm, a great flood swept the entire pueblo during the night. The flood is said to have devastated the area, claiming many lives.

This forced the inhabitants of "Cama Juan" to evacuate. The old site (Cama Juan) is known as "Balen Melakwan" or "Abandoned Town".

The inhabitants chose a field of evergreen grass and shrubbery on which to rebuild, which they named "Matayumtayum".

Towards the end of the nineteenth century, Francisco Macabulos and Captain Mariano Ignacio selected a more centrally located site for the future town to be known as La Paz. This existed only as a barrio of the town of Tarlac until 1892, when it was separated from the latter and renamed in honor of its patron saint Nuestra Senora de La Paz y Buen Viaje. Its emergence as a new town gave its citizens a chance to run their own government with Martin Aquino as the first gobernadorcillo.

La Paz was made the first seat of the revolutionary government of the province of Tarlac during the Spanish regime with Gen. Francisco Makabulos as its first provincial governor.

== Geography ==
La Paz lies in the southeast portion of the province and is 141 kilometres (88 mi) from Metro Manila, 17 kilometres (11 mi) from the provincial capital of Tarlac City, and 33 kilometres (21 mi) from Cabanatuan. It is bounded to the north by the town of Victoria, to the east by the Province of Nueva Ecija, to the south by the town of Concepcion, and to the west by Tarlac City.

The municipality has a total land area of 11,433 hectares (28,250 acres) which represents 3.75% of the entire provincial area. La Paz is politically subdivided into 18 barangays, of which barangays San Isidro and San Roque are considered as urban areas and the rest of the barangays are considered rural areas.

== Economy ==
La Paz is home to Solaren Renewable Energy Solutions Corporation, a Department of Energy (DOE) and Philippine Contractors Accreditation Board (PCAB)–accredited solar EPC contractor headquartered in the municipality.

== Barangays ==
La Paz is politically subdivided into 21 barangays:

- Balanoy
- Bantog-Caricutan
- Caramutan
- Caut
- Comillas
- Dumarais
- Guevara
- Kapanikian
- La Purisima
- Lara
- Laungcupang
- Lomboy
- Macalong
- Matayumtayum
- Mayang
- Motrico
- Paludpud
- Rizal
- San Isidro (Poblacion)
- San Roque (Poblacion)
- Sierra

=== Climate ===
Climate data for La Paz, Tarlac
Month	Jan	Feb	Mar	Apr	May	Jun	Jul	Aug	Sep	Oct	Nov	Dec	Year
Mean daily maximum °C (°F)	28 (82)	30 (86)	31 (88)	33 (91)	33 (91)	31 (88)	30 (86)	29 (84)	29 (84)	30 (86)	30 (86)	29 (84)	30 (86)
Mean daily minimum °C (°F)	10 (50)	20 (68)	20 (68)	22 (72)	24 (75)	24 (75)	24 (75)	24 (75)	24 (75)	23 (73)	22 (72)	21 (70)	22 (71)
Average precipitation mm (inches)	4 (0.2)	4 (0.2)	5 (0.2)	11 (0.4)	66 (2.6)	99 (3.9)	127 (5.0)	113 (4.4)	99 (3.9)	84 (3.3)	35 (1.4)	14 (0.6)	661 (26.1)
Average rainy days	2.2	1.9	3.2	5.3	16.1	20.8	23.5	22.8	22.2	16.5	8.9	3.5	146.9
Source: Meteoblue

== Demographics ==
Population census of La Paz
Year	Pop.	±% p.a.
1903	4,389	—
1918	8,991	+4.90%
1939	13,298	+1.88%
1948	18,395	+3.67%
1960	21,843	+1.44%
1970	27,150	+2.20%
1975	32,885	+3.92%
1980	35,330	+1.44%
1990	41,946	+1.73%
1995	45,207	+1.41%
2000	52,907	+3.43%
2007	61,324	+2.06%
2010	60,982	−0.20%
2015	64,017	+0.93%
2020	68,952	+1.58%
2024	71,978	+1.04%
Source: Philippine Statistics Authority

In the 2024 census, the population of La Paz was 71,978 people, with a density of 630 inhabitants per square kilometre or 1,600 inhabitants per square mile.

== Economy ==
Poverty incidence of La Paz (%)

Source: Philippine Statistics Authority

== Tourism ==
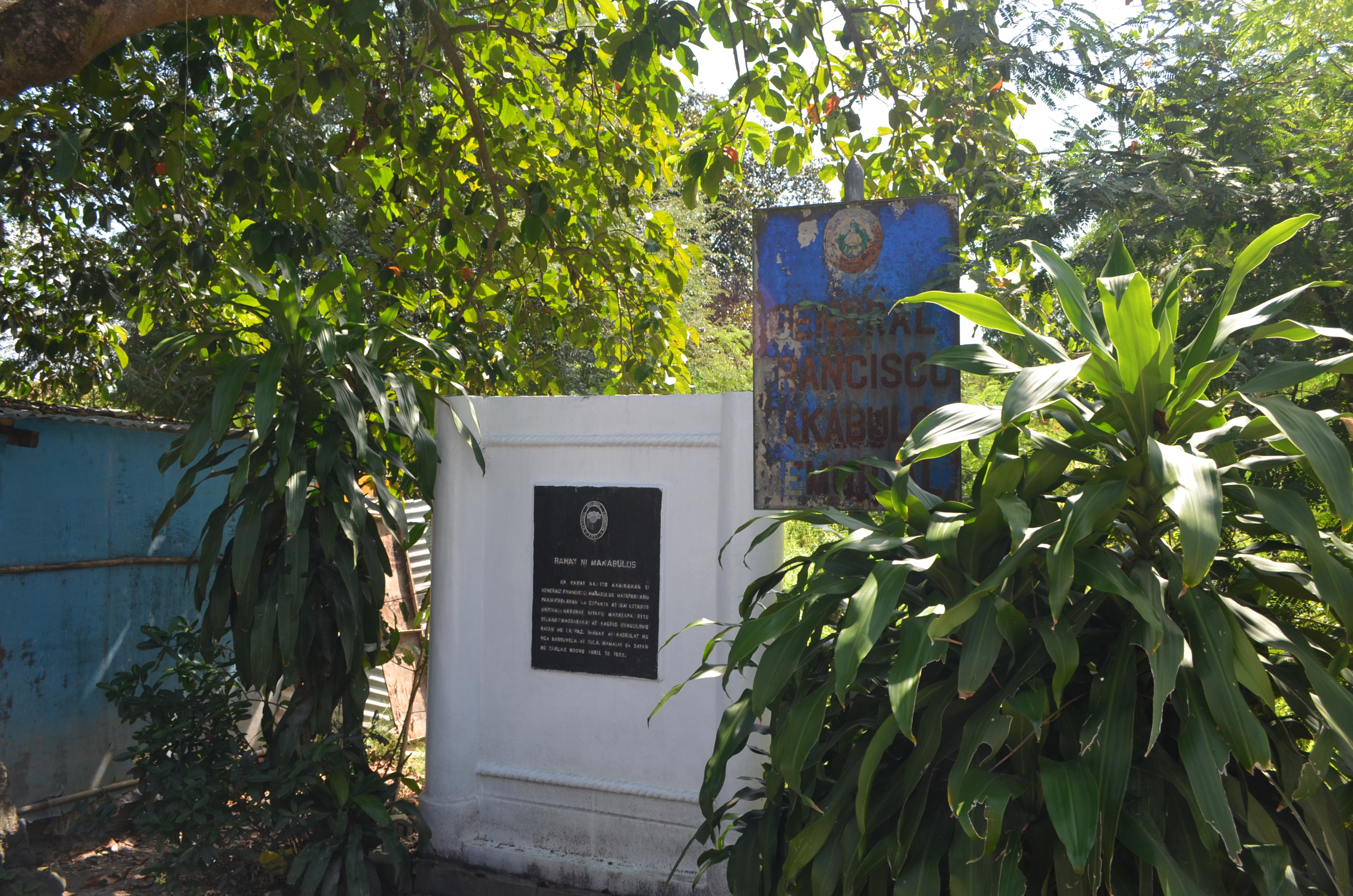
Remains of the site of the ancestral house of Gen. Francisco Macabulos

The feast of Nuestra De Seṅora De La Paz every January 23 to 24. Other tourism attractions in the town include Macabulos ancestral house, Nuestra Seṅora De La Paz Church, and Chico River Grill Station.

== Transportation ==
The municipality has an approximate total road network of 78.863 kilometres (49.003 mi) which are classified into four (4) categories, namely: national, provincial, municipal and barangay roads.

The barangay road network has an approximate length of 49.264 kilometres (30.611 mi). The roads are paved with either concrete, asphalt, gravel or dirt. The gravel and dirt roads have a total length of 42.794 kilometres (26.591 mi).

La Paz is the northern terminus of the Subic–Clark–Tarlac Expressway (SCTEx) where it connects with Tarlac–Pangasinan–La Union Expressway (TPLEx) and Central Luzon Link Expressway (CLLEx).

Several buses from Metro Manila going Nueva Ecija passes through the town via Subic–Clark–Tarlac Expressway (SCTEx).

== Education ==
There are two schools district offices which govern all educational institutions within the municipality. They oversee the management and operations of all private and public, from primary to secondary schools. These are La Paz North Schools District Office, and La Paz South Schools District Office.

=== Primary and elementary schools ===
- Balanoy Elementary School
- Bantog Elementary School
- Caramutan Elementary School
- Caut Elementary School
- Comillas Elementary School
- Dumarais Elementary School
- E.M. Castaneda Central School
- Great Eastern Institute
- Guevara Elementary School
- Guevara Ecumenical Christian School
- Kapanikian Elementary School
- La Paz Christian Academy
- La Purisima Elementary School
- Lara Primary School
- Laungcupang Elementary School
- Lomboy Elementary School
- Macalong Elementary School
- Matayumtayum Elementary School
- Mayang Elementary School
- Motrico Elementary School
- Paludpud Elementary School
- Rizal Multigrade
- San Isidro Central Elementary School
- Sierra Elementary School
- Uzziel Montessori School

=== Secondary schools ===
- Comillas High School
- Guevara National High School
- La Paz National High School

== Points of interest ==
- (F-1790) Shrine of Our Lady of Peace and Good Voyage (Nuestra Señora de la Paz y Buen Viaje), La Paz 2314 Tarlac, Philippines (Titular: Our Lady of Peace and Good Voyage, Feast day, January 24; Former Parish Priest: Father Ramon Capuno under the Roman Catholic Diocese of Tarlac; Pilgrims seek healing; Vicariate of Immaculate Conception (Victoria, Tarlac) Vicar Forane: Father Vely Lapitan.LA PAZ: THE CORRIDOR OF UPCOMING MARKET GROWTH AND BOOM

== Gallery ==
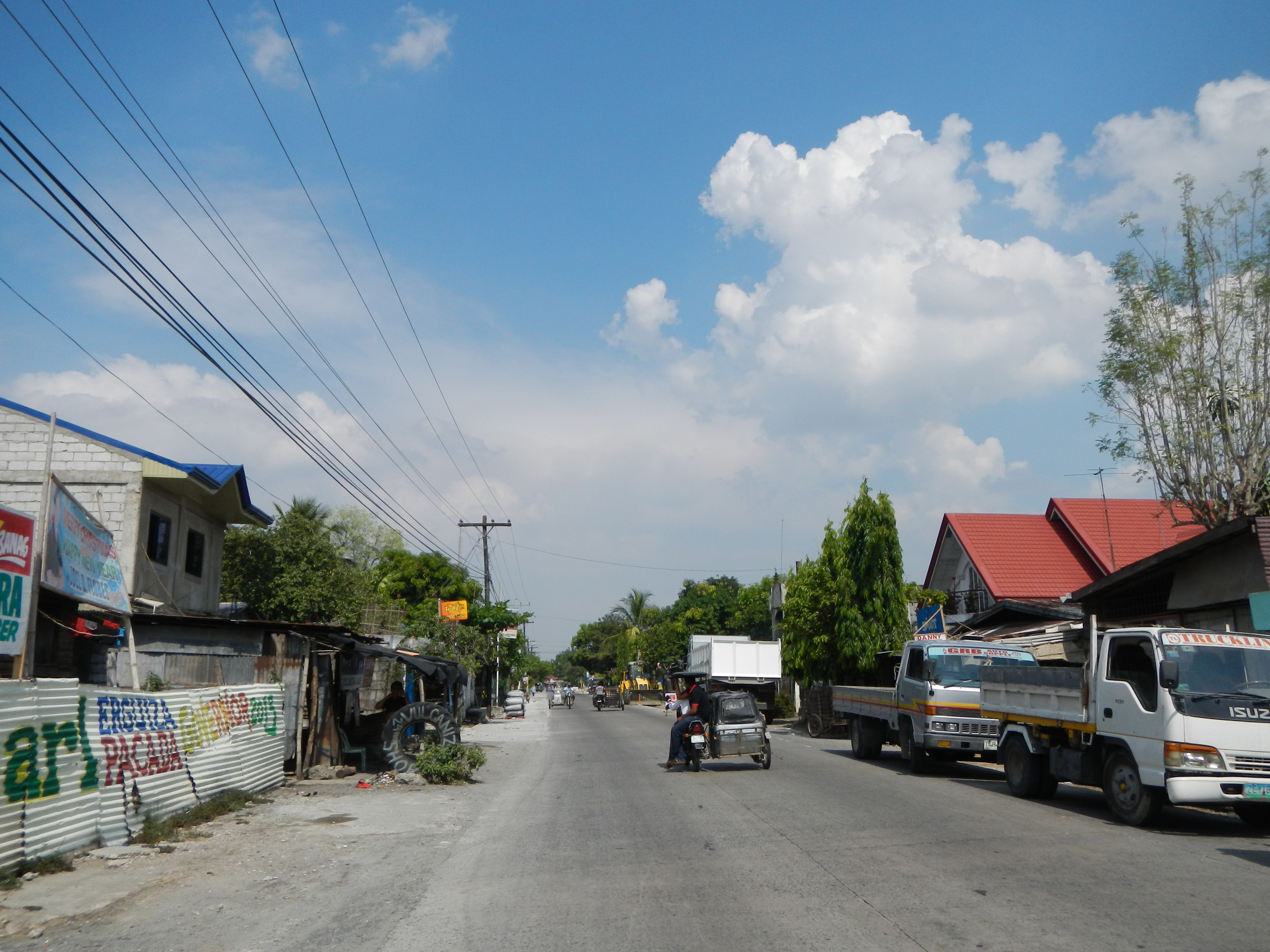
Highway

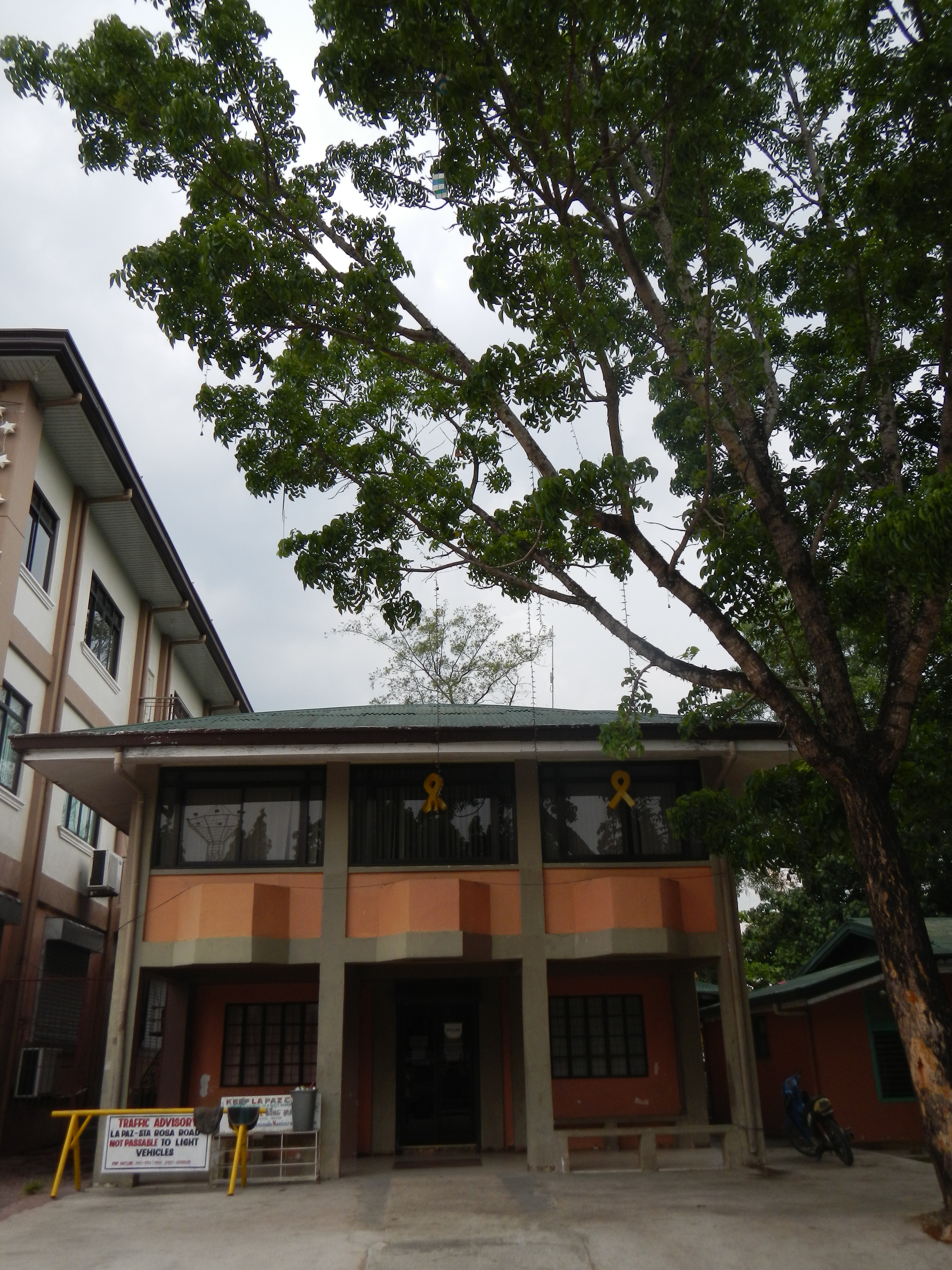
Legislative building

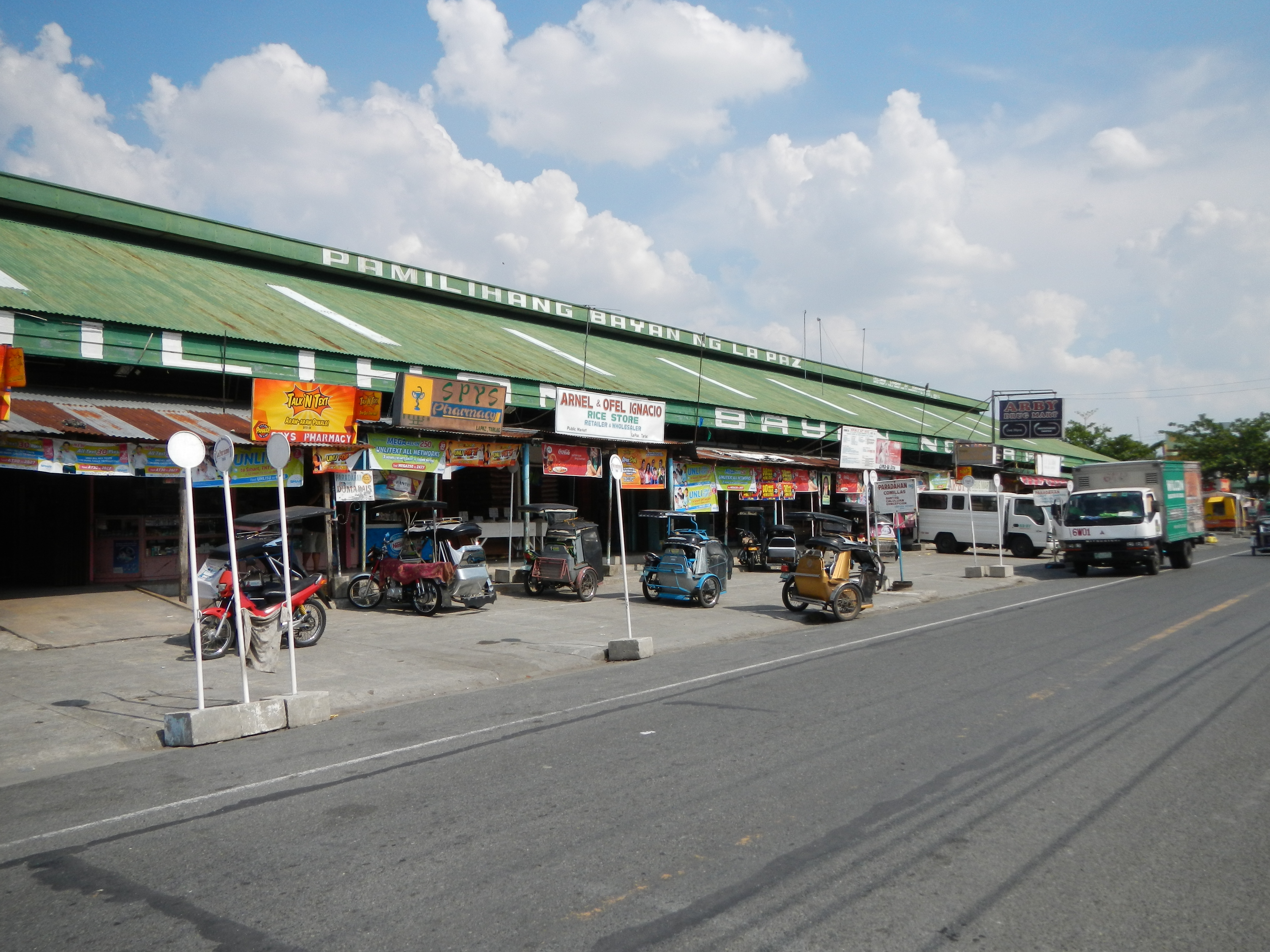
Public market

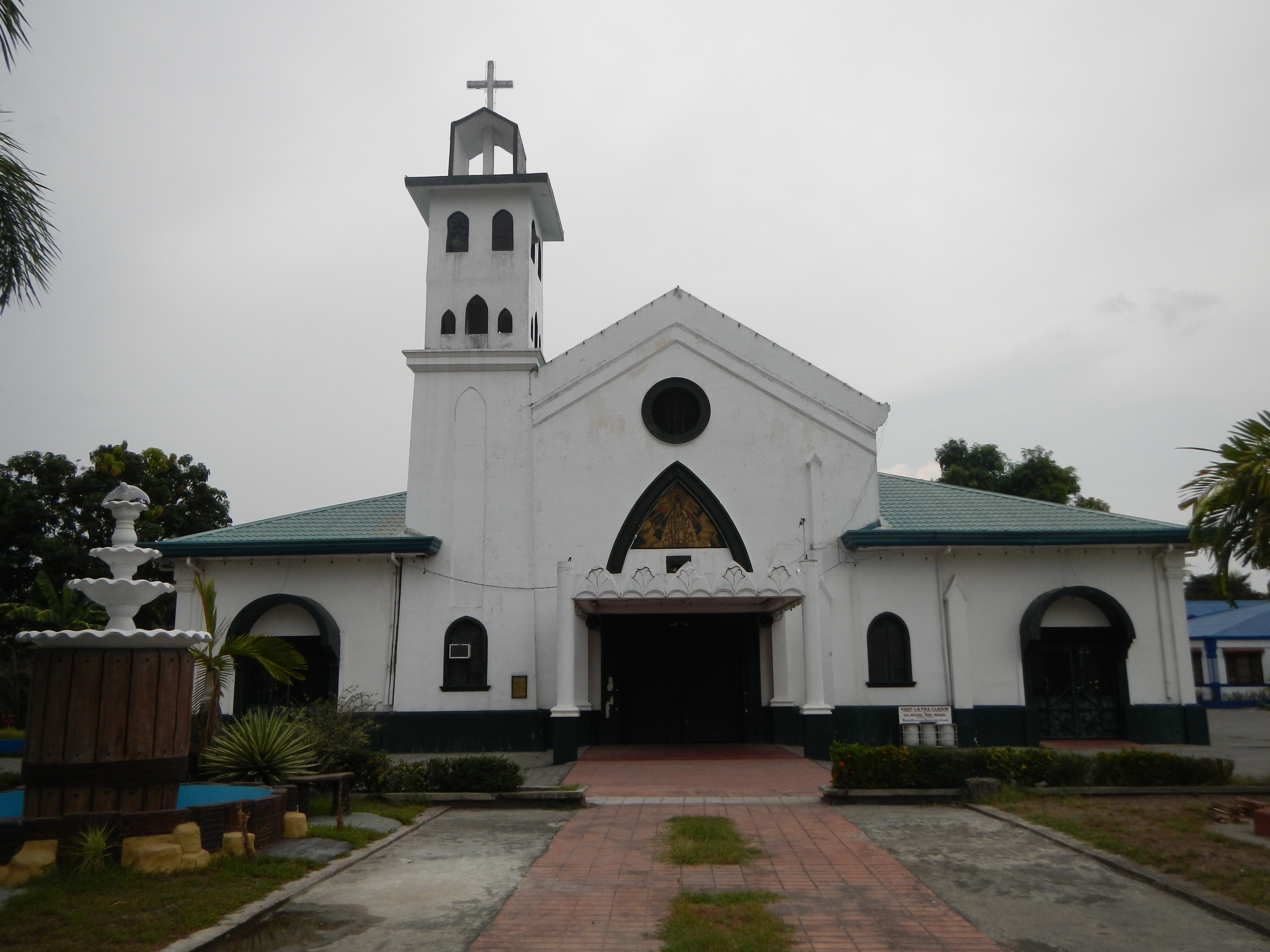
La Paz Church Shrine of Our Lady of Peace and Good Voyage

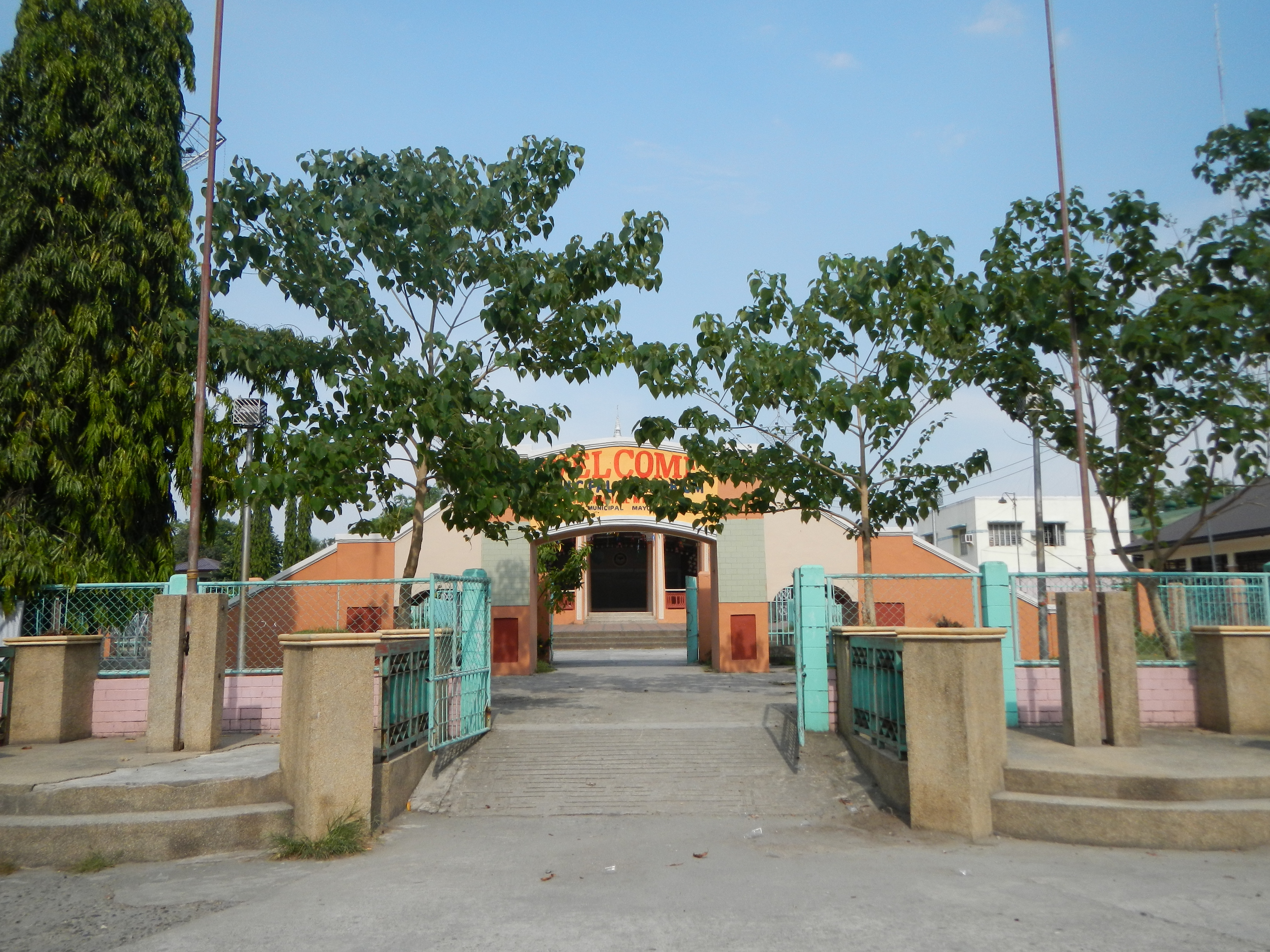
Park

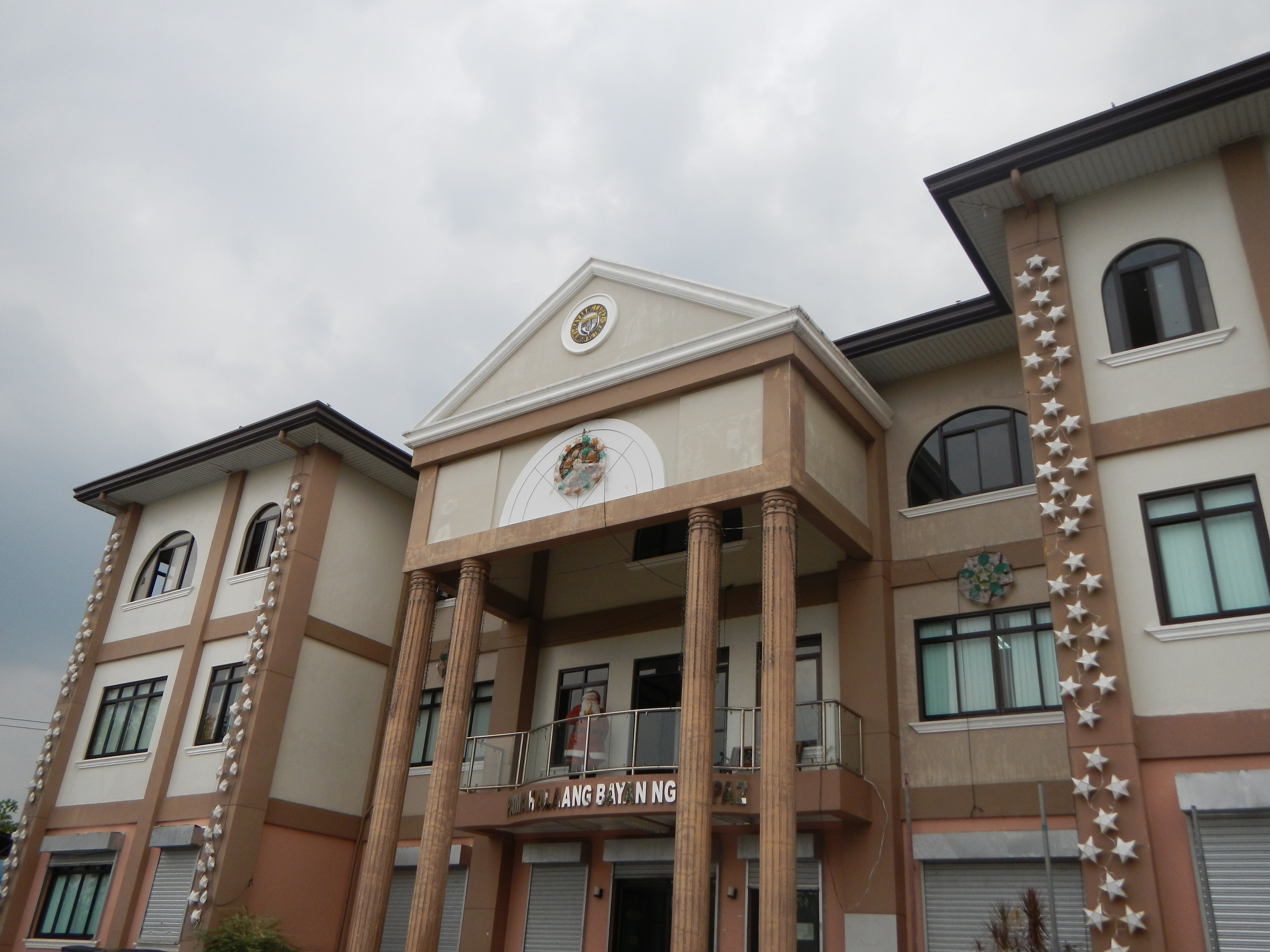
Town hall Facade
