= Provisional Government of the Philippines (1986–1987) =

Republic of the Philippines Republika ng Pilipinas (Filipino)
- 1986–1987
- Flag Coat of arms
- Anthem: Lupang Hinirang (English: "Chosen Land")
- Location of the Philippines in Southeast Asia.
- Capital: Manila (de jure); 14°38′N 120°58′E; Metro Manila (Note: While Manila is designated as the nation's capital, the seat of government is the National Capital Region, commonly known as "Metro Manila", of which the city of Manila is a part. Many national government institutions are located on various parts of Metro Manila, aside from Malacañang Palace and other institutions/agencies that are located within the Manila capital city.) (de facto)
- Largest city: Quezon City; 14°39′N 121°02′E
- Common languages: Pilipino (official); English; Other regional languages
- Government: Unitary provisional revolutionary government
- President
  - 1986–1987: Corazon Aquino
- Vice President
  - 1986–1987: Salvador Laurel
- Legislature: None (parliament dissolved)
- History
  - People Power Revolution: February 22–25, 1986
  - Corazon Aquino inaugurated: February 25, 1986
  - Provisional Constitution: March 25, 1986
  - 1987 Constitution adopted: February 2, 1987
- Currency: Philippine peso (₱)
- Time zone: UTC+08:00 (PST)
- Date format: mm/dd/yyyy; dd-mm-yyyy
- ISO 3166 code: PH
Preceded by	Succeeded by
Fourth Republic of the Philippines	Fifth Republic of the Philippines
- Today part of: Philippines

A provisional revolutionary government was set up in the Philippines following the People Power Revolution which ended on February 25, 1986. The revolution removed President Ferdinand Marcos and his dictatorial regime, and installed Corazon Aquino as his successor.

== History ==
The controversial 1986 Philippine presidential election is the culminating event that led to the People Power Revolution which deposed Ferdinand Marcos as president and installed Corazon Aquino as the new president of the country. Marcos' administration was noted for its authoritarian rule, especially under the Martial law era.

The Communist Party of the Philippines–New People's Army–National Democratic Front (CPP–NPA–NDF) initiated talks for a ceasefire following Aquino's ascendancy to the presidency and praised the 1986 revolution for restoring civil liberties and freeing 500 political prisoners but remained wary of "United States imperialism" and figures it considers as reactionaries within the Philippine military.

A provisional government was proclaimed in March 1986 by Aquino with the adoption of an interim constitution, informally called "Freedom Constitution" by her administration. She did not officially proclaim a "revolutionary government" which some of her aides advised as too inflammatory. Aquino also abolished the Batasang Pambansa, the national legislature previously dominated by Marcos' party the Kilusang Bagong Lipunan, and claimed legislative powers for herself. The interim constitution replaced the 1973 constitution adopted during Marcos' administration.

Aquino had vast personal powers under the provisional constitution. This includes the power to remove and replace local government officials during the transition period. Supporters of Aquino's measures backed near absolute powers given by the interim constitution as necessary so that the "dictatorial" machinery of Marcos could be dismantled while opponents argue that such powers could also make Aquino's government a dictatorship. She projected that a regular government under a new constitution would be in place within a year.

The Presidential Committee on Human Rights and the Presidential Commission on Good Government were established, with the latter tasked to investigate cases of graft and corruption and recover ill-gotten assets by the Marcos administration and their affiliates for the government. Censorship was relaxed, with the Movie and Television Review and Classification Board (MTRCB) for example evaluated and suggested to function as a classification board instead as a censorship body.

In April 1986, the 1986 Constitutional Commission (ConCom) was formed to draft a new constitution. Aquino named the initial 45 members the following month. They came from different political and religious backgrounds, and were themselves appointed rather than elected. No communists were named to the body, but Aquino allotted at least five slots to affiliates of Marcos' administration. The first session of the ConCom was held on June 2, 1986.

Marcos' vice presidential running mate in the 1986 elections, Arturo Tolentino proclaimed himself as acting president on July 6, 1986, under the 1973 Constitution during a coup attempt which lasted for two days. He was backed by soldiers at the Manila Hotel.

The draft constitution passed by the ConCom on October 12, 1986, and was presented to President Aquino three days later. The draft constitution was subject to a plebiscite on February 2, 1987. The results of the plebiscite was announced on February 11, 1987, with 16,622,111 or 76.30% of voters in favor of the draft. The 1987 Philippine Constitution was announced as ratified on the same day.

== Government ==
The Provisional Government of the Philippines in 1986 to 1987 functioned as an Interim provisional revolutionary government, although never was officially characterized as such. The legislative powers under the provisional government were exercised by the President with the abolishment of the Batasang Pambansa.
