= Dictatorial Government of the Philippines =

May–June 1898 government run by Emilio Aguinaldo

Dictatorial Government of the Philippines Gobierno Dictatorial de Filipinas (Spanish) Pamahalaang Diktatoryal ng Pilipinas (Tagalog)
- 1898
- Flag Coat of arms
- Anthem: Marcha Nacional Filipina (English: "Philippine National March")
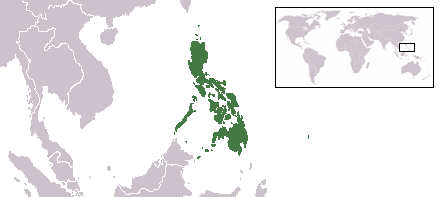
- Territory claimed by the Dictatorial Government of the Philippines in Asia
- Status: Unrecognized state
- Capital: Bacoor
- Common languages: Spanish, Tagalog
- Religion: Roman Catholicism, Islam, Philippine indigenous folk religions
- Government: Unitary provisional government authoritarian military dictatorship
  - Dictator: Emilio Aguinaldo
- Legislature: None (rule by decree)
- Historical era: Philippine Revolution
  - Established: May 24, 1898
  - Battle of Alapan: May 28, 1898
  - Independence declared: June 12, 1898
  - Proclamation (de jure): June 18, 1898
  - Disestablished: June 23, 1898
- Currency: Philippine Peso
Preceded by
Captaincy General of the Philippines
Central Executive Committee
Hong Kong Junta
Succeeded by
Revolutionary Government of the Philippines

The Dictatorial Government of the Philippines (Spanish: Gobierno Dictatorial de Filipinas) was an insurgent government in the Spanish East Indies inaugurated during the Spanish–American War by Emilio Aguinaldo in a public address on May 24, 1898, on his return to the Philippines from exile in Hong Kong, and formally established on June 18. The government was officially a dictatorship with Aguinaldo formally holding the title of "Dictator". The government was succeeded by a revolutionary government which was established by Aguinaldo on June 23.

== Background ==
In 1896, the Philippine Revolution began. In December 1897, the Spanish government and the revolutionaries signed a truce, the Pact of Biak-na-Bato, requiring that the Spanish pay the revolutionaries 800,000 pesos and that Aguinaldo and other leaders go into exile in Hong Kong. In April 1898, at the outbreak of the Spanish–American War, Commodore George Dewey aboard the U.S.S. Olympia sailed from Hong Kong to Manila Bay leading the Asiatic Squadron of the U.S. Navy. On May 1, 1898, the United States defeated the Spanish in the Battle of Manila Bay. Emilio Aguinaldo decided to return to the Philippines to help American forces defeat the Spaniards. The U.S. Navy agreed to transport him back aboard the USS McCulloch, and on May 19, he arrived in Cavite. On June 12, 1898, Aguinaldo proclaimed the independence of the Philippines at his house in Cavite El Viejo. Ambrosio Rianzares Bautista wrote the Philippine Declaration of Independence, and read this document in Spanish that day at Aguinaldo's house. On June 18, Aguinaldo issued a decree formally establishing his dictatorial government.

== Proclamation, establishment, and disestablishment ==
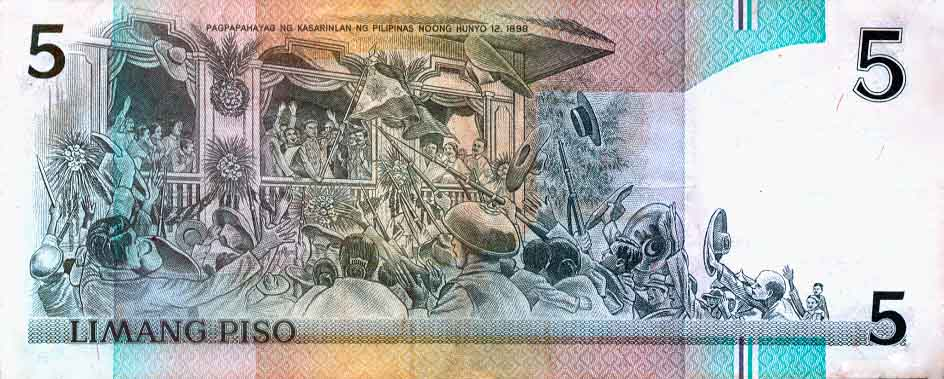
Independence Day at the Aguinaldo Shrine on the back of a 5 peso bill

The government was disestablished by Aguinaldo on June 23, 1898 ind replaced by the Revolutionary of the Philippines that he proclaimed on that date.

== American involvement ==
Writing retrospectively in 1899, Aguinaldo claimed that an American naval officer had urged him to return to the Philippines to fight the Spanish and said: "The United States is a great and rich nation and needs no colonies." Aguinaldo also wrote that after checking with Dewey by telegraph, U.S. Consul E. Spencer Pratt had assured him in Singapore: "That the United States would at least recognize the independence of the Philippines under the protection of the United States Navy. The consul added that there was no necessity for entering into a formal written agreement because the word of the Admiral and of the United States Consul were, in fact, equivalent to the most solemn pledge that their verbal promises and assurance would be fulfilled to the letter and were not to be classed with Spanish promises or Spanish ideas of a man’s word of honour." Aguinaldo received nothing in writing.

On April 28 Pratt wrote to United States Secretary of State William R. Day, explaining the details of his meeting with Aguinaldo:

"At this interview, after learning from General Aguinaldo the state of an object sought to be obtained by the present insurrectionary movement, which, though absent from the Philippines, he was still directing, I took it upon myself, whilst explaining that I had no authority to speak for the Government, to point out the danger of continuing independent action at this stage; and, having convinced him of the expediency of cooperating with our fleet, then at Hongkong, and obtained the assurance of his willingness to proceed thither and confer with Commodore Dewey to that end, should the latter so desire, I telegraphed the Commodore the same day as follows, through our consul-general at Hongkong:--

There was no mention in the cablegrams between Pratt and Dewey of independence or indeed of any conditions on which Aguinaldo was to cooperate, these details being left for future arrangement with Dewey. Pratt had intended to facilitate the occupation and administration of the Philippines, and also to prevent a possible conflict of action. In a communication written on July 28, Pratt made the following statement:

"I declined even to discuss with General Aguinaldo the question of the future policy of the United States with regard to the Philippines, that I held out no hopes to him of any kind, committed the government in no way whatever, and, in the course of our confidences, never acted upon the assumption that the Government would cooperate with him--General Aguinaldo--for the furtherance of any plans of his own, nor that, in accepting his said cooperation, it would consider itself pledged to recognize any political claims which he might put forward."

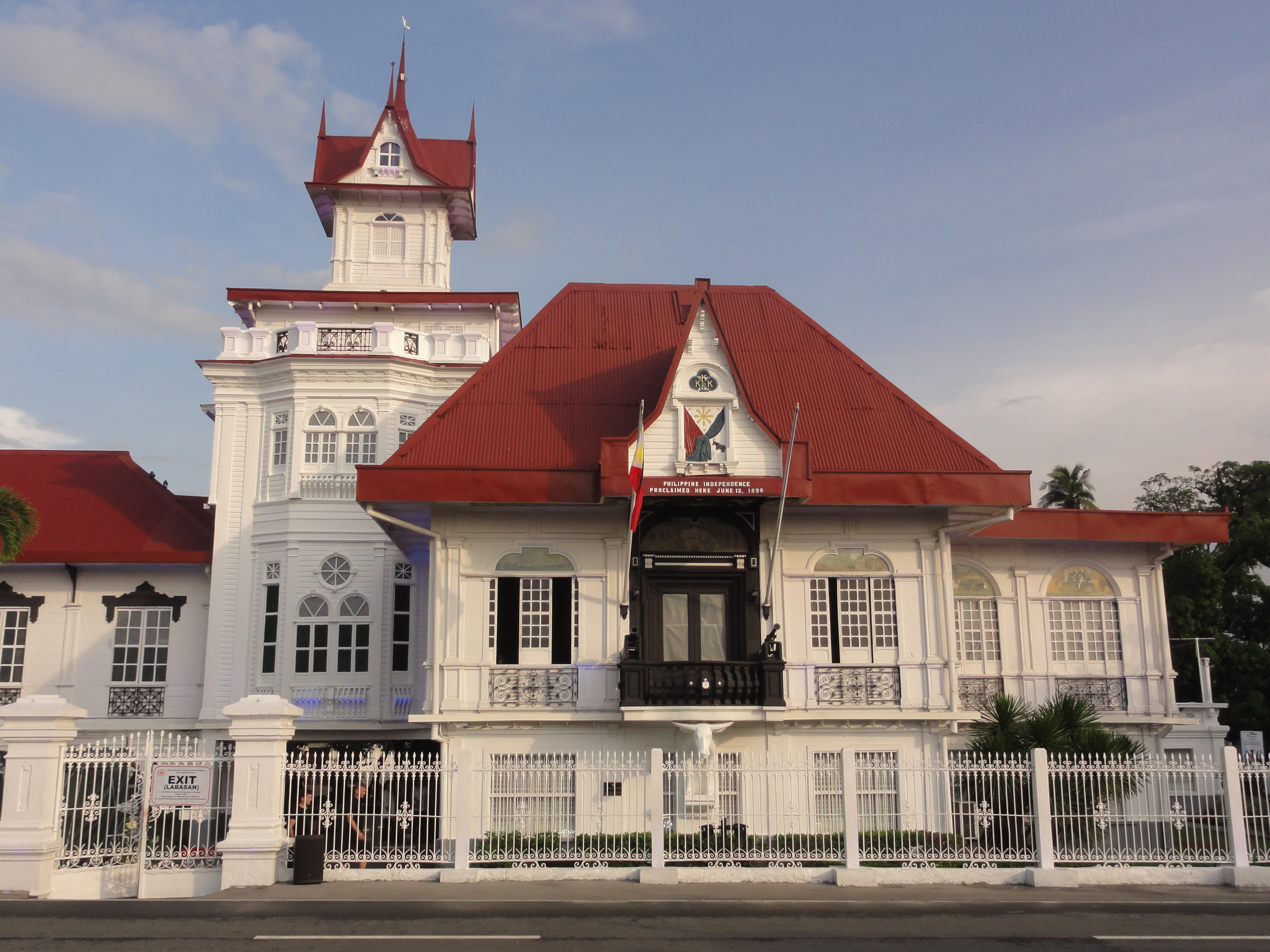
Aguinaldo Shrine where the Flag of the Philippines was waved declaring Philippine independence from Spain

On June 16, Secretary Day cabled Consul Pratt: "Avoid unauthorized negotiations with the Philippine insurgents," and later on the same day:

The Department observes that you informed General Aguinaldo that you had no authority to speak for the United States; and, in the absence of the fuller report which you promise, it is assumed that you did not attempt to commit this Government to any alliance with the Philippine insurgents. To obtain the unconditional personal assistance of General Aguinaldo in the expedition to Manila was proper if in so doing he was not induced to form hopes which it might not be practicable to gratify. This Government has known the Philippine insurgents only as discontented and rebellious subjects of Spain and is not acquainted with their purposes. While their contest with that power has been a matter of public notoriety, they have neither asked nor received from this Government any recognition. The United States, in entering upon the occupation of the islands, as the result of its military operations in that quarter, will do so in the exercise of the rights which the state of war confers, and will expect from the inhabitants, without regard to their former attitude toward the Spanish Government, that obedience which will be lawfully due from them. If in the course of your conferences with General Aguinaldo, you acted upon the assumption that this Government would co-operate with him for the furtherance of any plan of his own, or that, in accepting his co-operation, it would consider itself pledged to recognize any political claims which he may put forward, your action was unauthorized and can not be approved.

Filipino scholar Maximo Kalaw wrote in 1927: "A few of the principal facts, however, seem quite clear. Aguinaldo was not made to understand that, in consideration of Filipino cooperation, the United States would extend its sovereignty over the Islands, and thus in place of the old Spanish master a new one would step in. The truth was that nobody at the time ever thought that the end of the war would result in the retention of the Philippines by the United States."
