= Central Executive Committee (Philippines) =

Insurgent government in 1898

- Formation: April 17, 1898
- Extinction: May 19, 1898

Executive branch
- President: Francisco Macabulos

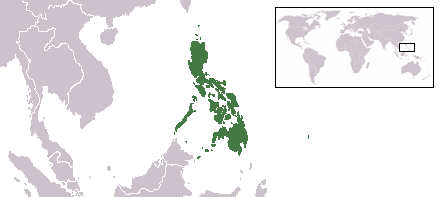
Area claimed by the Central Executive Committee

The Central Executive Committee (Spanish: Comité Ejecutivo Central; in modern Filipino: Komite ng Sentral na Tagapagpaganap) in the Philippines was an insurgent revolutionary government temporarily established by Francisco Macabulos on April 17, 1898, shortly after the December 14, 1897, signing of the Pact of Biak-na-Bato. That pact established a truce between Spanish colonial authorities in the Philippines and the revolutionary Republic of Biak-na-Bato calling for the exile of Emilio Aguinaldo and other senior revolutionaries. The exiled revolutionaries formed the Hong Kong Junta, and the Central Executive Committee was intended to remain in existence in the Philippines "until a general government of the Republic in these islands shall again be established, with a constitution which provided for a President, Vice President, Secretary of War and Secretary of the Treasury.." The committee was dissolved shortly after Aguinaldo's May 19, 1898, return to the Philippines.
