= Hong Kong Junta =

Organization of revolutionary Filipino exiles in the 19th century

Hong Kong Junta (Revolutionary Government in Exile)
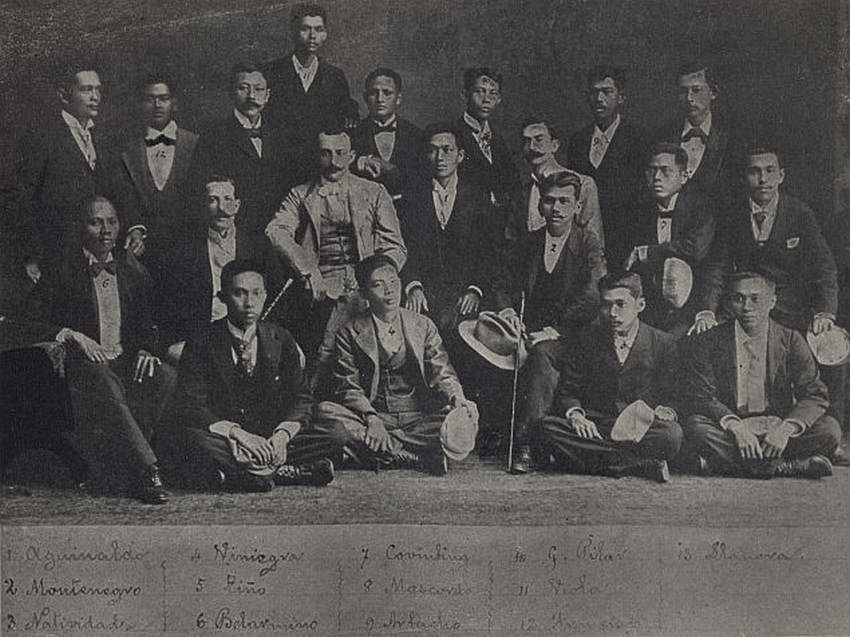
- Emilio Aguinaldo with other revolutionaries (Note: Including Mariano Llanera, Tomas Aguinaldo, Vito Belarmino, Antonio Montenegro, Escolastico Viola, Lino Viola, Valentin Diaz, Dr. Anastacio Francisco, Benito Natividad, Gregorio H. del Pilar, Manuel Tinio, Salvador Estrella, Maximo Kabigting, Wenceslao Viniegra, Doroteo Lopez, Vicente Lukban, Primitivo Artacho, Tomas Mascardo, Joaquin Alejandrino, Pedro Aguinaldo, Agapito Bonson, Carlos Ronquillo, Teodoro Legazpi, Agustin de la Rosa, Miguel Valenzuela, Antonio Carlos, Celestino Aragon, Jose Aragon, Pedro Francisco, Lazaro Makapagal y Lakang-dula, Silvestre Legazpi, Vitaliano Famular, Vicenter Kagton, Francisco Frani and Eugenio de la Cruz (not comprehensive)) after the Pact of Biak-na-Bato
- Formation: December 27, 1897
- Founding document: Pact of Biak-na-Bato
- Country: Philippines
- Meeting place: Hong Kong

The Hong Kong Junta was an organization formed as a revolutionary government in exile by Filipino revolutionaries after the signing of the Pact of Biak-na-Bato (hereafter termed Pact) on December 15, 1897. It was headed by Emilio Aguinaldo and included high-level figures in the Philippine revolution against Spanish rule who accompanied Aguinaldo into exile in British Hong Kong from the Philippines.

== Establishment ==
Filipinos with anti-Spanish sympathies had fled to Hong Kong since the 1872 Cavite mutiny as British law protected political refugees.

Filipino rebel leaders arriving in Dagupan, in a rail car. From left: Gregorio del Pilar, Wenceslao Viniegra, Emilio Aguinaldo and Vito Belarmino. At the extreme right is Pedro Paterno, who mediated the Pact of Biak-na-Bato.

The pact of Biak-na-Bato was signed on December 15, 1897. As part of this pact, Emilio Aguinaldo, then leader of the Philippine Revolution, agreed to leave the Philippines. On December 27, 1897, Aguinaldo and a number of ranking revolutionary officers (Note: Details of the precise makeup of the party vary between historical sources.) boarded the steamship Uranus at Sual, Pangasinan on Lingayen Gulf. On January 2, 1898, the first banking day after arrival in Hong Kong, Aguinaldo deposited $MXN400,000 (Note: The funds were denominated in Mexican dollars, which were worth at the time to about 50 US cents — equivalent to about $19.35 today.) which had been received from the Spanish government under the terms of the concluded Pact, into an account with the Hong Kong and Shanghai Bank under the name Aguinaldo and Company; further routine banking transactions followed. Aguinaldo established a strict budget for the exiles in Hong Kong and enforced a frugal existence.

== Financial turmoil and the repudiation of the pact ==
Some revolutionaries who had been left behind in the Philippines as the Central Executive Committee were dissatisfied with the arrangement which had exiles in Hong Kong enjoying funds made available in the Pact while they were left behind with no money, and negotiated an arrangement with the Spaniards for the second installment of those funds, amounting to another $MXN400,000, to be paid to them for distribution to needy insurgents in the Philippines. This was done, and the funds divided among insurgents left behind in Biak-na-Bato. Pedro Paterno, who had been instrumental in negotiating the Pact, informed Aguinaldo of this once it had been done.

Aguinaldo called a meeting and revealed information which he had received from Paterno and Miguel Primo de Rivera, nephew of the Spanish Governor General in the Philippines, that the Spanish would not provide additional funds "so long as there was any revolt in the Philippines and the society of the Katipunan was not dissolved ...". He then announced that Isabelo Artacho, who had been left behind in Biak-na-Bato as director of commerce, was resigning and demanding reimbursement of expenses. This had the effect of uniting the exiles to repudiate the Pact and renew the revolution, and they replaced the officials of the provisional government formed at Biak-na-Bato with members of the exiled group. The exiles voted to approve Aratcho's resignation but to deny him reimbursement. Artacho, having journeyed from the Philippines, arrived in Hong Kong and filed suit against Aguinaldo and Company. This resulted in the issuance of an injunction "to restrain the defendant [Aguinaldo] and each of them from dealing with or parting with the possession...$400,000, or any part thereof." (Note: The financial dispute was eventually settled on May 8, with payment of $MXN5,000 to Aratcho and withdrawal of his legal action.) Aguinaldo viewed this as preposterous and suspected that Aratcho had been put up to this by the Spanish Captain General in the Philippines in order to tie their funds up in litigation. After discussing the situation with Filipe Agoncillo and leaving some signed checks with Vito Belarmino, whom he named as his surrogate, Aguinaldo withdrew $MXN50,000 and, along with his secretary and two aides, Colonel Gregorio del Pilar and Lieutenant J. Leyba, secretly left Hong Kong for to Europe with a stop-over in Singapore using assumed names.

== American involvement in the Philippines ==
The United States Asiatic Squadron, commanded by George Dewey, having been ordered to Hong Kong by then Assistant Secretary of the Navy Theodore Roosevelt, had arrived there on 17 February 1898 and had been directed to prepare for war with Spain.

In Singapore, a businessman who had lived in the Philippines, Howard. W. Bray, sought out Aguinaldo and facilitated a meeting with meeting with U.S. Consul E. Spencer Pratt. In the meeting, conducted late at night in a public house with Bray and Leyba acting as interpreters, (Note: Bray spole halting Spanish, Leyba spoke good Spanish and had some proficiency in English.) Pratt informed Aguinaldo that the U.S. was now at war with Spain, inquired about the revolution, and opined, "As long as the Spanish have failed to fulfill their obligations under the Treaty of Biaknabato, (Note: Referring to the Pact of Biak-na-Bato.) you have the right to resume the revolution." and "Now is the time for you to strike. Ally yourselves with America and you will surely defeat the Spanish." (Note: As quoted by Aguinaldo. Further quotes and more detail there.) (Note: An account of the meeting and some of its outcomes, including a summary of an agreement allegedly drafted for approval by U.S. President McKinley, appear in a book later authored by a friend of Bray.) Aguinaldo returned to Hong Kong. (Note: Accounts of meetings in Singapore between Aguinaldo and Pratt and in Hong Kong between Aguinaldo and Wildman vary considerably.) The Junta had presumed initially that the Spanish–American War, begun in April, would be confined to the Atlantic Ocean, and that the U.S. squadron would intercept Spanish reinforcements which were sent to the Philippines. While Aguinaldo was in Singapore, the Junta had been negotiating terms for reconciliation with representatives of Spain in Hong Kong but, with Spain focused on war with the United States, these negotiations came to nothing. On 25 April, the United States squadron had received orders to proceed to the Philippines. Aguinaldo and his entourage arrived back in Hong Kong under assumed names on 1 May. Aguinaldo was expecting, based on his discussions in Singapore, that the Americans would provide transport for him to return to the Philippines. This was discussed in Junta meetings where Aguinaldo was re-designated as Junta president and it was decided that he should return. The USS McCulloch transported Aguinaldo with thirteen Junta members on a subsequent 17 May voyage, arriving in Cavite two days later.

Writing retrospectively in 1899, Aguinaldo claimed that an American naval officer had urged him to return to the Philippines to fight the Spanish and said "The United States is a great and rich nation and needs no colonies." Aguinaldo also wrote that after checking with Dewey by telegraph, U.S. Consul E. Spencer Pratt had assured him in Singapore:

That the United States would at least recognize the independence of the Philippines under the protection of the United States Navy. The consul added that there was no necessity for entering into a formal written agreement because the word of the Admiral and of the United States Consul were in fact equivalent to the most solemn pledge that their verbal promises and assurance would be fulfilled to the letter and were not to be classed with Spanish promises or Spanish ideas of a man's word of honour.

On April 28, Pratt wrote to United States Secretary of State William R. Day, explaining the details of his meeting with Aguinaldo:

At this interview, after learning from General Aguinaldo the state of an object sought to be obtained by the present insurrectionary movement, which, though absent from the Philippines, he was still directing, I took it upon myself, whilst explaining that I had no authority to speak for the Government, to point out the danger of continuing independent action at this stage; and, having convinced him of the expediency of cooperating with our fleet, then at Hongkong, and obtained the assurance of his willingness to proceed thither and confer with Commodore Dewey to that end, should the latter so desire, I telegraphed the Commodore the same day as follows, through our consul-general at Hongkong:--

There was no mention in the cablegrams between Pratt and Dewey of independence or indeed of any conditions on which Aguinaldo was to cooperate, these details being left for future arrangement with Dewey. Pratt had intended to facilitate the occupation and administration of the Philippines, and also to prevent a possible conflict of action.

On June 16, Secretary Day cabled Consul Pratt: "Avoid unauthorized negotiations with the Philippine insurgents," and later on the same day:

The Department observes that you informed General Aguinaldo that you had no authority to speak for the United States; and, in the absence of the fuller report which you promise, it is assumed that you did not attempt to commit this Government to any alliance with the Philippine insurgents. To obtain the unconditional personal assistance of General Aguinaldo in the expedition to Manila was proper, if in so doing he was not induced to form hopes which it might not be practicable to gratify. This Government has known the Philippine insurgents only as discontented and rebellious subjects of Spain, and is not acquainted with their purposes. While their contest with that power has been a matter of public notoriety, they have neither asked nor received from this Government any recognition. The United States, in entering upon the occupation of the islands, as the result of its military operations in that quarter, will do so in the exercise of the rights which the state of war confers, and will expect from the inhabitants, without regard to their former attitude toward the Spanish Government, that obedience which will be lawfully due from them. If, in the course of your conferences with General Aguinaldo, you acted upon the assumption that this Government would co-operate with him for the furtherance of any plan of his own, or that, in accepting his co-operation, it would consider itself pledged to recognize any political claims which he may put forward, your action was unauthorized and can not be approved.

In a communication written on July 28, Pratt made the following statement:

I declined even to discuss with General Aguinaldo the question of the future policy of the United States with regard to the Philippines, that I held out no hopes to him of any kind, committed the government in no way whatever, and, in the course of our confidences, never acted upon the assumption that the Government would cooperate with him—General Aguinaldo—for the furtherance of any plans of his own, nor that, in accepting his said cooperation, it would consider itself pledged to recognize any political claims which he might put forward.

Filipino scholar Maximo Kalaw wrote in 1927: "A few of the principal facts, however, seem quite clear. Aguinaldo was not made to understand that, in consideration of Filipino cooperation, the United States would extend its sovereignty over the Islands, and thus in place of the old Spanish master a new one would step in. The truth was that nobody at the time ever thought that the end of the war would result in the retention of the Philippines by the United States."

Aguinaldo wrote retrospectively in 1957 of his interpreter-assisted talk with Pratt in Singapore, "It is possible more than probable that in their transmission through our interpreters, the American Ideas and mine not only suffered curtailments but also acquired elaboration." (Note: See also Aguinaldo & Pacis 1957, pp. 53–55, in the chapter there titled, American Good Faith.)

== Aguinaldo in the Philippines ==
After arriving in the Philippines, Aguinaldo immediately announced his intention to establish a dictatorial government with himself as dictator, saying that he would resign in favour of a duly elected president. In the Battle of Alapan on May 28, 1898, Aguinaldo raided the last remaining stronghold of the Spanish Empire in Cavite with fresh reinforcements of about 12,000 troops. This battle eventually liberated Cavite from Spanish colonial control and led to the first raising of the modern flag of the Philippines in victory. Soon after, Imus and Bacoor in Cavite, Parañaque and Las Piñas in Morong, Macabebe, and San Fernando in Pampanga, as well as Laguna, Batangas, Bulacan, Nueva Ecija, Bataan, Tayabas (present-day Quezon), and the Camarines provinces, were liberated by the Filipinos. They were also able to capture the port of Dalahican in Cavite.

On June 12, 1898, Aguinaldo proclaimed the independence of the Philippines at his house in Cavite El Viejo. Ambrosio Rianzares Bautista wrote the Philippine Declaration of Independence, and read this document in Spanish that day at Aguinaldo's house. On June 18, Aguinaldo issued a decree formally establishing his dictatorial government. On June 23, Aguinaldo issued another decree, this time replacing the dictatorial government with a revolutionary government and naming himself as president.

== Further work in Hong Kong and in the Philippines ==
After Aguinaldo's departure, a schism developed between junta members close to him, committed to independence, and wealthy and influential early exiles in Hong Kong who desired the annexation of the Philippines by America, or status as a protectorate. Aguinaldo courted the second group, but only in hopes of gaining access to financial aid.

Before departing Hong Kong, Aguinaldo had arranged with U.S. Consul General Edwin Wildman for securing of arms, financing that with MXN$117,000 from the funds on deposit in Hong Kong. According to Aguinaldo, an initial shipment of 2,000 Mauser rifles and 200 000 cartridges was received in the Philippines, but a promised second shipment did not arrived. This may have reflected Wildman's reaction to instructions he had received after reporting an offer of alliance by Felipe Agoncillo in November 1897; at that time, the United States Department of State had instructed him to refuse.

In June, another shipment of arms consisting of 2,000 rifles and 200,000 rounds was delivered to the Philippines at a cost of $MXN80,000 This shipment was brokered by Teodoro Sandiko, who accompanied it to the Philippines. The Junta attempted to arrange procurement of arms from Japan and an order was placed for an initial shipment. Confusion over payment and the breaking out of open hostilities between American and Filipino forces, however, resulted in its cancellation.

Aguinaldo asked Agoncillo on August 7 to go to the United States:

so that McKinley's government may know our true situation. Make him understand that our country has its own government, that civil organizations exist in the provinces already taken and soon the congress of representatives of these provinces will meet. Tell them that they cannot do with the Philippines as they wish, because many misfortunes may happen both to us and to them if we do not come to an agreement as to our future relations. ...

A letter for President McKinley is herewith sent to you, so that he may recognize you as my representative. ... When congress shall have been assembled and said arrangements made, I will send you your proper credentials. ... The policy which you will pursue in the United States is the following: Make them understand that whatever may be their intentions towards us, that it is not possible for them to overrule the sentiments of the people represented by the government, and they must first recognize it if we are to come to an agreement. Still do not accept any contracts or give any promises respecting protection or annexation, because we will see first if we can obtain independence. This is what we shall endeavor to secure meanwhile if it should be possible to do so, still give them to understand in a way that you are unable to bind yourself but that once we are independent we will be able to make arrangements with them. ...

I have entire confidence in your recognized ability and wisdom which I also knew when we were companions, and I hope you will now pull all your moral courage together, because we will be between tigers and lions. Still, I believe you will be able to snatch our people away from their clutches.

Aguinaldo also asked those remaining in Hong Kong to work towards an alliance with the United States, with a mandate to negotiate away some Spanish island chains but to accept being an American protectorate only as a last resort. They were also instructed to unite the community of Filipinos in Hong Kong behind their cause.

On August 13, 1898, the Spanish surrendered Manila to the Americans. Relations with the Americans quickly became strained. On 30 August, Aguinaldo sent Agoncillo instructions informing him that U.S. Major General Wesley Merritt was leaving Manila to take part in peace negotiations between the United States and Spain in Paris. Agoncillo was to:

proceed as quickly as possible to America, in order to know what takes place. If perchance we should go back to Spanish control, ask them to help us as the French helped them during their own revolution and ask also the terms...I am not yet informed if it is true that our representatives are to be admitted to the Commission; if they should be admitted, go immediately to the place where they will meet, which it is said here will be Paris, September 15, and if among our countrymen there or in London there be one who will agree with the policy of the government, according to your instructions, propose him at once, so that credential [sic] may be sent him.

I am hastening the constitution of Congress so that it may at once consider some resolutions. In whatever agreement you may make you will insert as a condition the ratification of this government.

As early as possible I will transmit to you the names of those composing the committee in Hong Kong according to the enclosed decree. You can leave all the affairs I have confided to you in the hands of Galicano [Apacible] and Senior Crisanto Lichauco until the Board of Directors (Junta Direativa) shall be established.

Galicano Apacible, who had become head of the Junta, recommended bribing news service correspondents to produce favorable stories. An ambitions propaganda campaign for Philippine independence begun by the Junta was well underway by the spring of 1899. One result of this was an article in The Manila Times asking: "Will None of My Gallant Knights Rid Me of This Troublous Priest?", explaining:

Day after day we came across more cases of the remarkably false news that is being disseminated by Filipino agents all over the world, the Junta in Hong Kong being most notorious in this respect. It is scarcely conceivable that respectable news agencies would allow themselves to be influenced, or be indiscreet enough to be "taken in," by these political schemers. Nevertheless, telegrams are appearing in papers all over the world purporting to have been supplied by Reuters and the Associated Press which are nothing but a barefaced conglomeration of lies.

== United States sovereignty and war ==
On December 10, 1898, representatives of Spain and the United States signed the Treaty of Paris, ending the Spanish–American War. Article three of this treaty provided for the cession of the Philippines by Spain to the U.S. and payment by the U.S. to Spain of twenty million dollars. (Note: About 1 billion dollars today.)

The financial resources of the Juntas were being rapidly depleted with relatively little results. Repeatedly, agents of the Junta were forced to pay bribes to consummate their deals. By mid-December, 1898, the $MXN400,000 acquired by Aguinaldo from the Spaniards had been released by the Hong Kong banks; what was left was guarded carefully. The Junta pleaded for funds, which the Filipino government was unable to provide. Physical and administrative separation Junta members and between the Junta in Hong Kong and Aguinaldo in the Philippines fostered a divergence of ideas and policy. Continuous internal rivalries and personal intrigues wasted much energy.

On January 21, 1899, the First Philippine Republic was proclaimed with Aguinaldo as president, replacing Aguinaldo's revolutionary government. On June 2, 1899, the First Philippine Republic declared war against the United States, marking the official beginning of the Philippine–American war.

The scope of fighting between American and Filipino forces quickly expanded. On February 5, Aguinaldo sent Judge Florentino Torres, who had been a member of the recent Filipino negotiating commission, as emissary to the American commander, General Elwell Otis, to say that the fighting had begun accidentally and Aguinaldo was willing to end it. Otis responded, in the words of his provost marshal, "the fighting having once begun, must go on to the grim end." By November, superior U.S. forces had overcome organized resistance, and Filipino forces shifted from set piece battles to guerrilla warfare. Aguinaldo began a forced odyssey that would eventually end with his capture.

== Decline of the Junta ==
The re-election of McKinley as United States president put an end to Junta hopes for his defeat. News of that, announced by the Junta on November 10, 1900, demoralized insurgent forces in the Philippines. Aguinaldo was captured by United States forces in Palanan, Isabela on March 23, 1901 and on April 1, he swore allegiance to the United States. The Junta addressed a circular on April 8, to all Filipino commanders in the field informing them of Aguinaldo's capture and of the surrender of other leaders. This was the final demoralizing blow to most of the guerrillas in the field.

By 1903, the Junta had lost cohesiveness in Hong Kong and faded away as an organization. It was briefly reconstituted by Artemio Ricarte as the Katipunan Abuluyan, a society based upon the old Katipunan. Ricarte returned to the Philippines in December 1903 hidden in the hold of the S.S. Yuensang, a Chinese freighter, and attempted to reignite the revolution. He was arrested on April 29, 1904, tried, and sentenced to six years' imprisonment. He was banished from the islands in 1910 after refusing the oath of allegiance to the United States.

== Bibliography ==
- Aguinaldo, Don Emilio y Famy, "Chapter III. Negotiations", True Version of the Philippine Revolution, Authorama: Public Domain Books
- Aguinaldo, E.; Pacis, V.A. (1957), A Second Look at America, Makers of history, R. Speller
- Bell, Ronald Kenneth (April 1974). The Filipino Junta in Hong Kong, 1898-1903: history of a revolutionary organization (Thesis). Naval Postgraduate School.
- Brands, Henry William (1997). TR: The Last Romantic (full biography). New York: Basic Books. ISBN 978-0-465-06958-3. OCLC 36954615.
- de Viana, Augusto V. (2015). "The Development of the Philippine Foreign Service During the Revolutionary Period and the Filipino-American War (1896-1906): A Story of Struggle from the Formation of Diplomatic Contacts to the Philippine Republic" (PDF). The Antoninus Journal. 2.
- Guevara, Sulpico, ed. (1972). The laws of the first Philippine Republic (the laws of Malolos) 1898–1899. Ann Arbor, Michigan: University of Michigan Library.. (English translation by Sulpicio Guevara)
- Halstead, Murat (1898), "XXVIII. Battles with the Filipinos before Manila", The Story of the Philippines and Our New Possessions, Including the Ladrones, Hawaii, Cuba and Porto Rico
- Kalaw, Maximo Manguiat (1927). The Development of Philippine Politics. Oriental commercial.
- Kalaw, Maximo Manguiat (1927), "V. The Katipunan revolt under Bonifacio and Aguinaldo", The Development of Philippine Politics, Oriental commercial, pp. 69–98
- Miller, Nathan (1992). Theodore Roosevelt: A Life. William Morrow & Co.. onhline free to borrow
- Titherington, Richard Handfield (1900). A history of the Spanish–American War of 1898. D. Appleton and Company. (republished by openlibrary.org)
- Paterno, Pedro Alejandro (June 2, 1899). "Pedro Paterno's Proclamation of War". The Philippine-American War Documents. San Pablo City, Philippines: MSC Institute of Technology, Inc.
- Worcester, Dean Conant (2004) [1914], "II. Was independence promised?", The Philippines: Past and Present (vol. 1 of 2), Macmillan, pp. 39–43, ISBN 1-4191-7715-X
