= Pact of Biak-na-Bato =

1897 truce during the Philippine Revolution

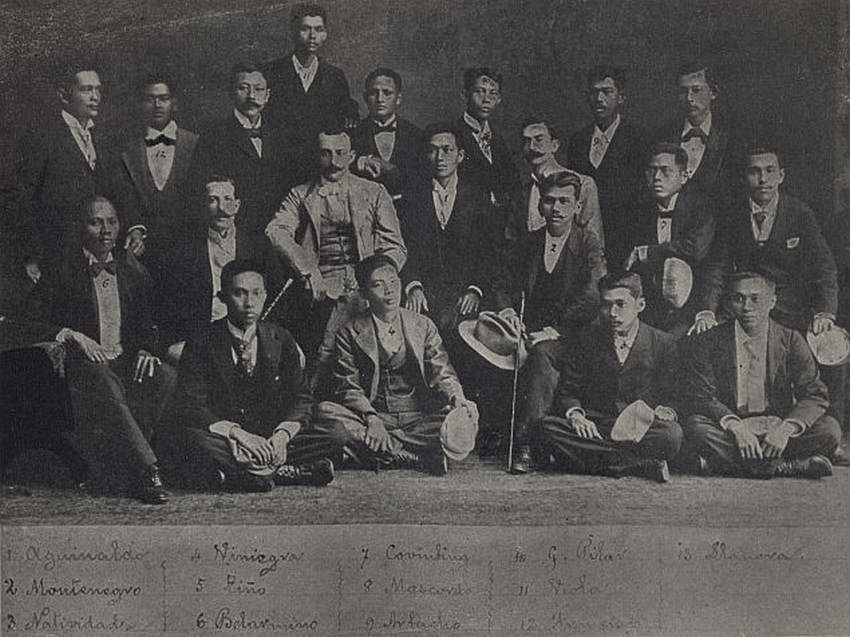
- Filipino revolutionaries exiled to Hong Kong. Sitting on Emilio Aguinaldo's right is Lt. Col. Miguel Primo de Rivera, nephew and aide-de-camp of Fernando Primo de Rivera and father of José Antonio Primo de Rivera, who was held hostage until Aguinaldo's indemnity was paid. Standing behind Aguinaldo is Col. Gregorio del Pilar. Standing behind Miguel and to his right is Pedro Paterno.
- Type: Peace treaty, amnesty
- Signed: December 14, 1897
- Location: San Miguel, Bulacan in Luzon Island, Philippines
- Signatories: Spain; Republic of Biak-na-Bato
- Languages: Spanish, Tagalog

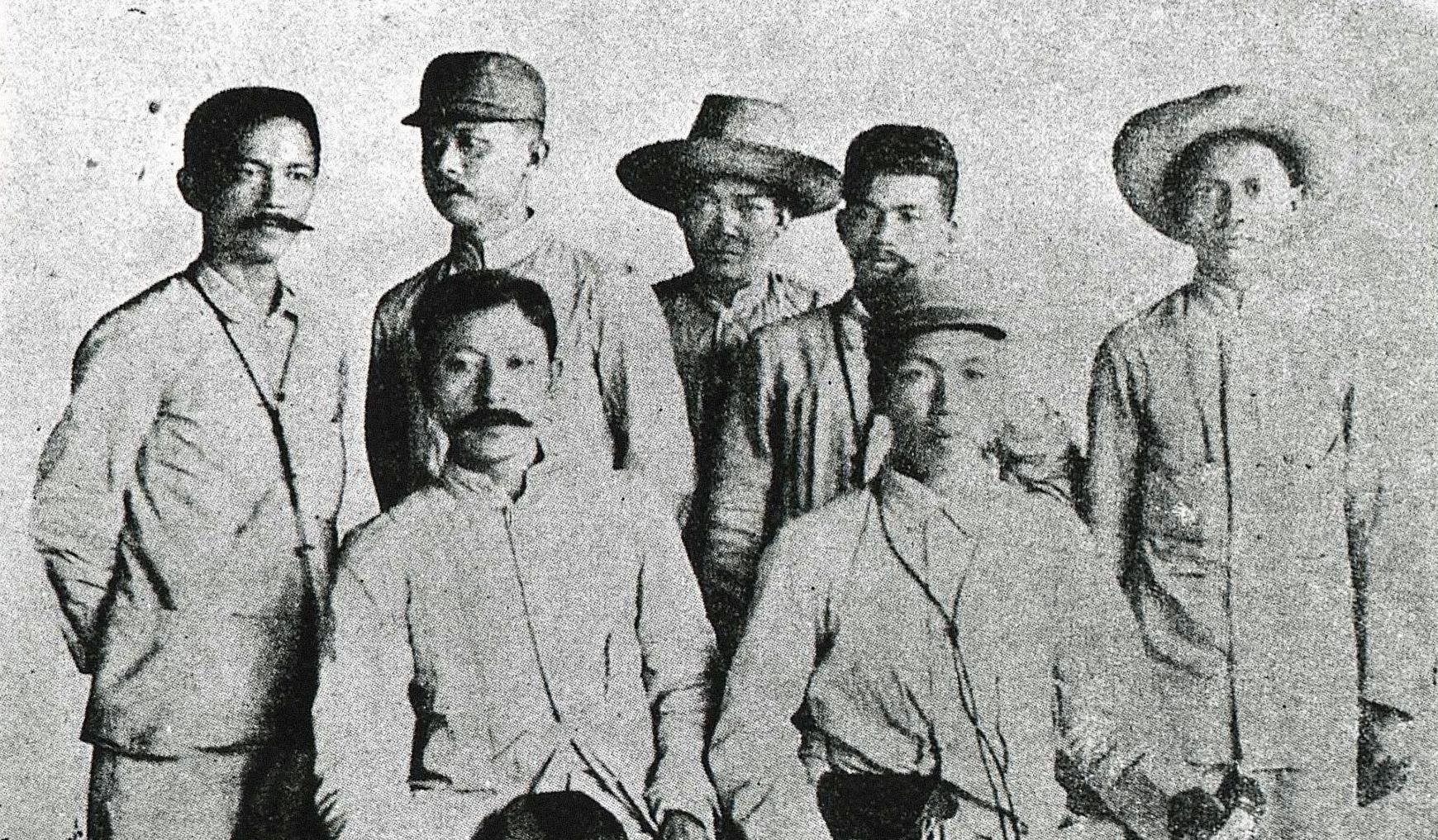
The Filipino negotiators for the Pact of Biak-na-Bato. Seated from left to right: Pedro Paterno and Emilio Aguinaldo with five companions

The Pact of Biak-na-Bato, signed on December 14, 1897, created a truce between Spanish colonial Governor-General Fernando Primo de Rivera and the revolutionary leader Emilio Aguinaldo to end the Philippine Revolution. Aguinaldo and his fellow revolutionaries were given amnesty and monetary indemnity by the Spanish government, in return for which the revolutionary government would go into exile in Hong Kong. Aguinaldo had decided to use the money to purchase advance firearms and ammunition later on return to the archipelago.

The pact was signed in San Miguel, Bulacan, in the house of Pablo Tecson, a Philippine revolutionary captain who served as brigadier general in the 'Brigada Del Pilar' (military troop) of General Gregorio del Pilar during the Revolution.

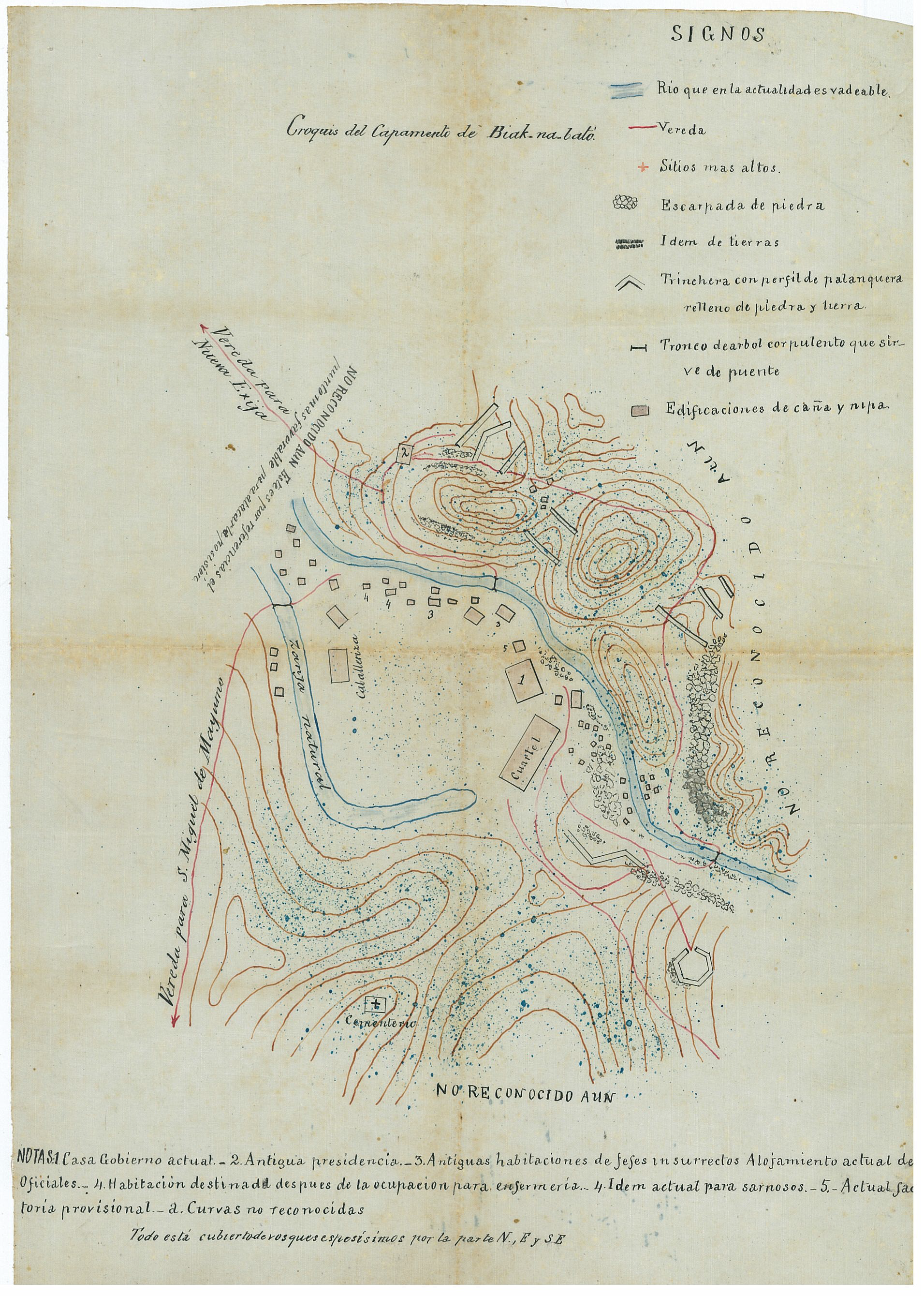
A hand-drawn Spanish military map of Gen. Emilio Aguinaldo's headquarters at Biak-na-bato (ca. 1897)

== Provisions ==
According to General Emilio Aguinaldo, writing in 1899, the principal conditions of the Pact of biak-na-bato were:

1. That I would, and any of my associates who desired to go with me, be free to live in any foreign country. Having fixed upon Hong Kong as my place of residence, it was agreed that payment of the indemnity of $MXN800,000 (Note: The Mexican dollar at the time was worth about 50 US cents, equivalent to about $19.35 today. The peso fuerte and the Mexican dollar were interchangeable at par.) should be made in three installments, namely, $MXN400,000 when all the arms in Biak-na-bató were delivered to the Spanish authorities; $MXN200,000 when the arms surrendered amounted to eight hundred stand; the final payment to be made when one thousand stand of arms shall have been handed over to the authorities and the Te Deum sung in the Cathedral in Manila as thanksgiving for the restoration of peace. The latter part of February was fixed as the limit of time wherein the surrender of arms should be completed.
2. The whole of the money was to be paid to me personally, leaving the disposal of the money to my discretion and knowledge of the understanding with my associates and other insurgents.
3. Prior to evacuating Biak-na-bató the remainder of the insurgent forces under Captain-General Primo de Rivera should send to Biak-na-bató two General of the Spanish Army to be held as hostages by my associates who remained there until I and a few of my compatriots arrived in Hong Kong and the first installment of the money payment (namely, four hundred thousand dollars) was paid to me.

It was also agreed that the religious corporations in the Philippines be expelled and an autonomous system of government, political and administrative, be established, though by special request of General Primo de Rivera these conditions were not insisted on in the drawing up of the Treaty, the General contending that such concessions would subject the Spanish Government to severe criticism and even ridicule.

According to historian Teodoro Agoncillo, the pact was made up of three documents which together came to be known as the Truce of Biak-na-Bató and which provided, among other things:

- That Aguinaldo and his companions would go into voluntary exile abroad.
- That Governor-General Primo de Rivera would pay the sum of $MXN800,000 to the rebels in three installments:

1. $MXN400,000 to Aguinaldo upon his departure from Biak-na-Bató,
2. $MXN200,000 when the arms surrendered by the revolutionists amounted to 800 stand, and
3. the remaining $MXN200,000 when the arms surrendered amounted to 1,000 stand, Te Deum in the Cathedral in Manila as thanksgiving for the restoration of peace.

- That Primo de Rivera would pay the additional sum of $MXN900,000 to the families of the non-combatant Filipinos who suffered during the armed conflict.

According to historian Sonia M. Zaide, the agreement consisted of three parts:

1. A document called "Program", generally as described by Agoncillo.
2. A document called "Act of Agreement" which reiterated parts of the "Program" document and hinted at the desire of the Filipinos for reforms but contained no definite agreement by Spain to grant such reforms.
3. A third document which discussed the question of indemnity, specifying that Spain would pay a total of $1,700,000— $MXN800,000 as above plus $MXN900,000 to be distributed among the civilian population as compensation for the ravages of war.

== Results ==
In accordance with the first part of the pact, Aguinaldo and twenty five other top officials of the revolution were banished to Hong Kong with $MXN400,000 in their possession. The rest of the men received $MXN200,000, but the third installment was never received. General amnesty was never declared and sporadic skirmishes continued.
