= Timeline of Philippine political history =

This article presents a timeline of Philippine political history focused on governmental transitions of the Philippine archipelago, major polities, invasion attempts, and insurgency movements from the pre-Hispanic period to the present. (Note: This article may be incomplete; lacking, in particular, information regarding the MNLF, MILF and Abu Sayyaf groups which should possibly be included. See e.g., the Civil conflict in the Philippines article.) The information presented here is highly summarized, and more complete information can be found in more detailed articles linked below.

Major Polities and governmental transitions
Date range (Note: Date ranges are approximate, and are generally drawn from the Establishment and Disestablishment dates of individual polities in the Polities ros.)	Before 900 – April 27, 1565	April 27, 1565 – December 10, 1898	August 24, 1896 – May 10, 1897	March 22, 1897 – November 1, 1897	November 1, 1897 – December 14, 1897	May 24, 1898 – June 23, 1898	June 23, 1898 – January 23, 1899	January 23, 1899 – March 23, 1901	August 14, 1898 – July 1, 1902	May 6, 1902 – July 14, 1906	July 4, 1901 – November 15, 1935	November 15, 1935 – October 22, 1946	October 14, 1943 – August 17, 1945	July 4, 1946 – December 30, 1965	December 30, 1965 – February 25, 1986	February 2, 1987 –
Sovereign entity	None	Spain					In transition (Note: On January 23, 1899, Philippine revolutionary forces promulgated the First Philippine Republic and, unrecognized by the international community, proclaimed its sovereignty over the Philippines. This occurred while the Spanish–American War was ongoing, with an active theater of combat in the Philippines. Negotiations to end that war began on September 26, 1898 and, ended on December 10 with the signing of the Treaty of Paris, Article III of that treaty transferred sovereignty over the Philippines from Spain to the United States.)			United States			Disputed	Republic of the Philippines		
Governing body	None	Spanish East Indies				Disputed (Note: During the period from May to December 1898 Spanish sovereignty over the Philippines was not in dispute but, after the Philippines became a theater of combat in the Spanish–American War in May 1898, the Philippine Revolution was renewed with American support. Philippine revolutionary forces declared independence from Spain on June 12, 1898, in the midst of continuing engagement. Negotiations in Paris to end the war concluded on December 10, 1898 with the Treaty of Paris, in which Spain agreed to cede the Philippines and other territories to the U.S.)		Philippine Commission				Commonwealth of the Philippines	Second Philippine Republic	Republic of the Philippines		
Polities	Pre-Colonial Philippines	Spanish East Indies	Spanish East Indies; Republika ng Katagalugan aka Haring-Bayang Katagalugan	Spanish East Indies; Republica Filipina aka Republica de Filipina aka Pamahalaan ng Sangkatagalugan	Spanish East Indies; Republica de Filipinas	Spanish East Indies (Note: Ended with the signing of the 1898 Treaty of Paris.); U.S. Colonial Government (Note: U.S. Military Government was established on August 14, 1898. The Taft Commission was established on March 16, 1900 with legislative authority, and established civil government over areas as U.S. control solidified. The office of the Military Governor was abolished with the passage of the Philippine Organic Act on July 1, 1902.); Gobierno Dictatorial de Filipinas	U.S. Colonial Government Gobierno Revolucionario de Filipinas	U.S. Colonial Government; Republica Filipina	U.S. Colonial Government	Taft Commission Republika ng Katagalugan aka Republika ng Kapuluang Katagalugan	US Insular Government	Commonwealth of the Philippines	Second Philippine Republic (Note: The Second Philippine Republic was established on January 3, 1942 and dissolved on October 14, 1943. It followed the provisional Philippine Executive Commission, established on January 3, 1942 after the December 8, 1941 Japanese invasion of the Philippines.) and Government in exile of the Commonwealth of the Philippines	Third Republic of the Philippines	Fourth Republic of the Philippines	Fifth Republic of the Philippines
	Entries below this point reflect the viewpoint of the post-independence government of the Philippines regarding pre-independence history															
Constitutional Document		Colonial authority of The Crown	Katipunan constitution, laws and official decrees	Official decrees of Aguinaldo	Provisional Constitution	Official decrees of Aguinaldo		Malolos Constitution	Katipunan constitution, laws and official decrees	United States Constitution	Philippine Organic Act (1902); Philippine Autonomy Act (1916); Tydings–McDuffie Act	1935 Constitution	1943 Constitution	1935 Constitution	1973 Constitution	1987 Constitution
Capital		Manila	Morong	San Francisco de Malabon, Cavite	San Miguel, Bulacan	Bacoor, Cavite	Malolos, Bulacan	Malolos, Bulacan	Morong	Manila			Manila (1942–1945); Baguio (1945)	Manila (1946–1948); Quezon City (1948–1965)	Quezon City (1965–1976); Manila (1976–1986)	Manila
Form of Government	Precolonial barangay	Spanish Colony	Unrecognized provisional revolutionary republic	Unrecognized provisional revolutionary republic	Unrecognized provisional revolutionary constitutional republic	Unrecognized provisional dictatorship	Unrecognized provisional revolutionary republic	Unrecognized Unitary semi-presidential constitutional revolutionary republic	Unrecognized provisional revolutionary republic	Military occupational transitional government	Unincorporated territories of the United States	Presidential commonwealth	Single-party authoritarian Republic (recognized only by Axis)	Unitary presidential Constitutional republic	Unitary dominant-party pseudo-parliamentary republic under totalitarian civic-military rule	Unitary presidential constitutional republic
Head of State	Datu, Rajah, Sultan	Queen Regent of Spain; King of Spain	Supreme President/President of the Sovereign Nation: Andres Bonifacio	President of the Philippines: Emilio Aguinaldo (1897)	President of the Philippines: Emilio Aguinaldo (1897)	Dictator: Emilio Aguinaldo	President of the Philippines: Emilio Aguinaldo	President of the Philippines: Emilio Aguinaldo (1899–1901); Miguel Malvar (1901–1902) (unofficial)	Supreme President: Macario Sakay	US President: William McKinley (1898–1901); Theodore Roosevelt (1901–1902)	US President: Theodore Roosevelt (1901–1909); William H. Taft (1909–1913); Woodrow Wilson (1913–1921); Franklin D. Roosevelt (1933–1935)	President of the Philippines: Manuel L. Quezon (1935–1944); Sergio Osmeña (1944–1946); Manuel Roxas (1946)	President of the Philippines: Jose P. Laurel (1943–1945)	President of the Philippines: Manuel Roxas (1946–1948); Elpidio Quirino (1948–1953); Ramon Magsaysay (1953–1957); Carlos P. Garcia (1957–1961); Diosdado Macapagal (1961-1965)	President of the Philippines: Ferdinand Marcos (1965–1986); Corazon Aquino (1986)	President of the Philippines: Corazon Aquino (1986–1992); Fidel V. Ramos (1992–1998); Joseph Estrada (1998–2001); Gloria Macapagal Arroyo (2001–2010); Benigno Aquino III (2010–2016); Rodrigo Duterte (2016–2022); Bongbong Marcos (2022–)
Head of Government	Datu, Rajah, Sultan	Spanish Governor-General	Supreme President/President of the Sovereign Nation: Andres Bonifacio	President of the Philippines: Emilio Aguinaldo (1897)	President of the Philippines: Emilio Aguinaldo (1897)	Dictator: Emilio Aguinaldo	Prime Minister of the Philippines: Apolinario Mabini (1898–1899)	President of the Philippines: Emilio Aguinaldo (1899–1901); Miguel Malvar (1901–1902) (unofficial)	Supreme President: Macario Sakay	US Military Governor- General: Wesley Merritt (1898); Elwell S. Otis (1898–1900); Arthur MacArthur Jr. (1900–1901); Adna Chaffee (1901–1902)	US Insular Governor- General: William H. Taft (1901–1904); Francis B. Harrison (1913–1921); Leonard Wood (1921–1927); Frank Murphy (1933–1935)	President of the Philippines: Manuel L. Quezon (1935–1944); Sergio Osmeña (1944–1946); Manuel Roxas (1946)	Japanese Military Governor: Shigenori Kuroda (1943–1944); Tomoyuki Yamashita (1944–1945)	President of the Philippines: Manuel Roxas (1946–1948); Elpidio Quirino (1948–1953); Ramon Magsaysay (1953–1957); Carlos P. Garcia (1957–1961); Diosdado Macapagal (1961-1965)	Prime Minister of the Philippines: Ferdinand Marcos (1978–1981); Cesar Virata (1981–1986); Salvador Laurel (1986)	President of the Philippines: Corazon Aquino (1986–1992); Fidel V. Ramos (1992–1998); Joseph Estrada (1998–2001); Gloria Macapagal Arroyo (2001–2010); Benigno Aquino III (2010–2016); Rodrigo Duterte (2016–2022); Bongbong Marcos (2022–)
Legislative	Council of Elders	Consejo de Indias (1565–1821); Cortes Generales (1821–1898)	Kataastaasang Sanggunian (Supreme Council)		Consejo Supremo		Revolutionary Congress	Malolos Congress		Martial law (1898–1900); Philippine Commission (1900–1902)	Philippine Legislature	National Assembly (1935–1941); Congress (1945–1946)	National Assembly	Congress of the Philippines	Batasang Pambansa: Interim Assembly (1978–1984); Regular Natioanal Assembly (1984–1986)	Congress of the Philippines
Judiciary	Datu as Presiding Officer: Council of Elders as Jurors	Real Audiencia	Camara Reina (Secret Judicial Chamber)		Supreme Council of Grace and Justice	Court Martial		Supreme Court		US Supreme Court	Supreme Court of the Philippines					
Military	Datu as Military Commander: Qualified members of the Barangay as soldiers	Spanish Imperial Army; Guarda Civil	Katipunan	Philippine Revolutionary Army				Philippine Republican Army	Katipunan	United States Army	United States Army; USA Philippine Division; Philippine Constabulary; Philippine Scouts	Armed Forces of the Philippines; USA Philippine Division; Philippine Constabulary	Armed Forces of the Philippines			
Currency	Piloncitos	Real de a Ocho; Peso Fuerte	Peso										Japanese government-issued Philippine peso	Peso		
Official Language(s)		Spanish	Tagalog	Tagalog, Spanish					Tagalog	English, Tagalog	English	English, Spanish	Japanese, Filipino, Spanish	English, Filipino		
State Religion	None; Islam in sultanates	Roman Catholicism	Separation of church and state													
Invasions and Insurgencies	The Cordillera region was unified after the long clan wars between the Clans and tribes of Ifugao and Kalinga warlords because of land resources. This unification established the culturally homogeneous society which led to the building of the Banaue Rice Terraces.; Sri Lumay conducted a Rebellion against the Maharajah of the Chola Dynasty and established the Rajahnate of Cebu.; In 1500, Bruneian Empire attacked Palawan, Kingdom of Ma-i (the island of Mindoro) and Kingdom of Tondo. Tondo was defeated in 1500 and Brunei deposed the Senapati Lakan Sukwu, establishing Kota Seludong and installing Rajah Sulayman as its puppet ruler.	Further information: Philippine revolts against Spain In 1529, Spain claimed dominion over the Philippine archipelago on the basis of Magellan's discovery, a valid mode of acquisition at the time. Various local revolts erupted throughout Spanish rule. (Note: These revolts included: Dagami Revolt (1567), Manila Revolt (1574), Pampangos Revolt (1585), Conspiracy of the Maharlikas (Luzon), Tondo Conspiracy (1587–1588), Revolts Against the Tribute (1589), Magalat Revolt (1596); Igorot Revolt (1601), Chinese revolt of 1602, Irraya Revolt (1621), Tamblot Revolt (1621–1622), Bankaw Revolt (1621–1622), Isneg Revolt (1625–1627), Cagayan Revolt (1639), Ladia Revolt (1643), Zambales Revolt (1645), Pampanga Revolt (1645), Sumuroy Revolt (1649–50), Pintados Revolt (1649–1650), Zambal Revolt (1660), Maniago Revolt (1660), Malong Revolt (1660–1661), Ilocano Revolt (1661), Chinese revolt of 1662, Panay Revolt (1663), Sambal Revolt (1681–1683), Tingco plot (1686), Rivera Revolt (1718), Magtanĝaga Revolt (1718), Caragay Revolt (1719), Dagohoy Rebellion (1744–1829), Agrarian Revolt (1745–1746); Silang Revolt (1762–63), Palaris Revolt (1762–1765), Camarines Revolt (1762–1764), Cebu Revolt (1762–1764), Dabo and Marayac Revolt (1763), Isabela Revolt (1763); Lagutao Revolt (1785), Ilocos Norte Revolt (1788), Magtanong and Malibiran Revolt (1787), Nueva Vizcaya Revolt (1805), Ambaristo Revolt (1807), Ilocos Norte Revolt (1811), Sarat Revolt (1815), Bayot Revolt (1822), Novales Mutiny (1823), Parang and Upay Revolt (1822–1835), Pule Revolt (1840–1841), Camerino Revolt (1865–1869), Labios Revolt (1870–1871), Cavite Mutiny (1872).) Battles of La Naval de Manila, a series of five naval battles between Spanish and Dutch forces in 1646. Further information: Eighty Years' War The Ilustrados "enlightened ones" constituted the Filipino educated class during the Spanish colonial period in the late 19th century. Mostly based outside the Philippines, they helped mold the flame of a united Filipino nationalism and identity in the islands. Almost all previous insurgencies were tribal, provincial and regional in nature.	The Katipunan secret revolutionary society, formed in 1892, became an insurgent government in August when armed conflict against Spain breaks out upon its discovery. This begins what is generally called the Philippine Revolution.; January 1895 – Andrés Bonifacio assumes Supreme Presidency of the Katipunan.; August 1896 – Upon the Katipunan's discovery, the Katipunan Supreme Council was reorganised into a "cabinet" of an insurgent revolutionary government. Andrés Bonifacio is re-elected Kataastaasang Pangulo or Presidente Supremo, Supreme President of the Katipunan. The Katipunan and its successor insurgent movements regarded themselves as legitimate governments from this point onwards. Bonifacio referred to the Katipunan-based insurgent government as the "Republic of the Tagalog Nation/People" (Tagalog: Republika ng Katagalugan) and to the insurgent "Philippine nation" as the "Sovereign Nation of the Tagalog People" (Haring-Bayang Katagalugan), with "republic" and "sovereign nation" effectively being synonyms, and "Tagalog" used in place of "Filipino" but referred to the whole Philippines and its people.	March 22, 1897 – Emilio Aguinaldo is elected president of a government meant to replace the prior Katipunan insurgent government by attendees of the Tejeros Convention. He was sworn in the day after and fully assumed the office by April despite Bonifacio having annulled the convention proceedings.	Established as an insurgent constitutional republic on November 2, 1897, with Aguinaldo as President. This insurgent government had a constitution, President, Vice President, etc. December 14, 1897 – Signing of the Pact of Biak-na-Bato, suspending the insurgency. Aguinaldo and other insurgent leaders went into voluntary overseas exile. Armed activities temporarily officially halted by the Filipino revolutionary forces. Central Executive Committee April 1898 – General Francisco Makabulos forms the insurgent General Executive Committee of Northern Luzon, intended to be a provisional government "until a general government of the Republic in these islands shall again be established." This insurgent government had a constitution, President, Vice President, etc.	May 1, 1898 – Hostilities between the U.S. and Spain commenced in the Philippines.: 19 May – Aguinaldo returns to the Philippines.; 24 May – Aguinaldo announces in Cavite, "... I return to assume command of all the forces for the attainment of our lofty aspirations, establishing a dictatorial government which will set forth decrees under my sole responsibility, ..."; June 12, 1898 – Independence is proclaimed in Kawit by the Dictatorial Government of the Philippines.; June 18 – Aguinaldo proclaims dictatorial government.	June 23, 1899 – Aguinaldo issues proclamation replacing his dictatorial government with a revolutionary one.	January 22, 1899 – Promulgation of the Malolos Constitution. Replaces Aguinaldo's insurgent revolutionary government with the Malolos Republic, also known as the First Philippine Republic, with Aguinaldo as president. Although the republic never received foreign recognition, Filipinos consider Aguinaldo to be the first president based on this. Gen. Miguel Malvar, successor of Aguinaldo continued the fight until he surrendered in 1902. Clashes with Moro rebels continued in the south.: Several groups collectively known as Irreconcilables continued fighting the United States military, the Philippine Scouts, or the Philippine Constabulary. These included remnants of the Katipunan and other resistance groups.	In 1902, General Macario Sakay, a veteran Katipunan member, revived Bonifacio's Republika ng Katagalugan (simplified to "Tagalog Republic" by Americans), and held the presidency with Francisco Carreón as vice president. In April 1904, Sakay issued a manifesto declaring Filipino right to self-determination at a time when support for independence was considered a crime by the American occupation forces in the Philippines.; The republic ended in 1906 when Sakay and his leading followers surrendered upon being promised amnesty. Instead they were arrested, and in the following year were executed as bandits.	Until 1913 scattered resistance to U.S. rule continued based on the First Republic's or the Katipunan's platforms. From then until 1935 there was no organized mass resistance, but small pockets of defiance still persisted coming mostly from various religious sects, sakdalistas and die-hard republikanos.	Small segments of opposition continued from a new front, mainly from the legal nationalist and labor groups. Following the end of World War II, there was resistance from the Hukbalahap and the short lived/progressive political party, Democratic Alliance (DA).	Hukbalahap: On March 29, 1942, peasant leaders determined to oppose the Japanese invasion met in a forest clearing at the junction of the provinces of Tarlac, Pampanga, and Nueva Ecija to organize a resistance movement against the Japanese invaders. The movement was designated Hukbó ng Bayan Laban sa Hapón (People's Army Against Japan) or Hukbalahap.	Resistance from Hukbalahap continued. Hukbalahap later changed its name to "Hukbong Magpapalaya ng Bayan" (People's Liberation Army) or simply "Huks".: On May 17, 1954, Luis Taruc, leader of the Hukbalahap/Huk movement, surrendered unconditionally and announced that he "unreservedly recognized the authority of president Magsaysay and the sovereignty of the republic of the Philippines."	None, or See Notes		
Sovereignty notes	Philippines as one whole national entity was non-existent. Islands comparable to Greece composed of numerous sovereign and independent chiefdoms, several minor kingdoms and thalassocracies such as the Kedatuan of Madja-as, the rajahnates of Cebu and Butuan, Sultanates of Maguindanao, Lanao and Sulu who were all already engaged in trading with the Chinese, Japanese, Malaysians, Indonesians, the Arabs and the Indians. Considered by Western nations as territorium nullius (an expression deriving from Roman Law meaning "empty land," or "land belonging to no one").	In 1521, explorer Ferdinand Magellan landed in the Philippines and claimed the islands for Spain; Miguel López de Legazpi forced the Treaty of Cebu on Rajah Tupas, which effectively gave Spain suzerainty over Cebu.; From Cebu, Legaspi expanded Spanish rule across the Philippines, taking possession of Manila for Spain in 1571.; Referendum of 1599 legitimised Spain's sovereignty.; The British Occupation happened between 1762 and 1764 during the Seven Years' War. Only the colonial capital of Manila and the nearby principal port of Cavite were taken by the British.								August 14, 1898 – The day after the surrender of Manila to their forces, General Wesley Merritt established a military government over portions of the country under American control.; December 10, 1898 – Spain cedes the Philippines to the United States.; January 1/2, 1899 – Acting Spanish Governor-General Diego de los Ríos returns to Manila from Zamboanga.; January 4 – U.S. General Elwell Otis issues proclamation announcing the United States as having obtained possession and control of all of the Philippines from the Spanish.; February 6, 1899 – Treaty of Paris is ratified by the U.S. Senate.; March 19 – Treaty of Paris is ratified by the Queen-Regent of Spain.; April 11 – Following exchange of treaty ratifications between the U.S. and Spain, the Philippines became an Unincorporated Territory of the United States.; On June 2, 1899, undeclared general hostilities between U.S. and Philippine forces having been ongoing since February 4, the Malolos Republic promulgated a Declaration of War against the United States, thereby officially beginning the Philippine–American War.; Emilio Aguinaldo, President of the Malolos Republic, was captured by U.S. Forces on March 23, 1901.; Aguinaldo signed a formal surrender document on April 19, 1901, acknowledging and accepting the sovereignty of the United States throughout the entire archipelago. The war was officially declared over by the United States government in July 1902.; However, military resistance continued for several years and was labelled as mere banditry and brigandage (Spanish: bandolerismo) by the American authorities. One example was the resistance of Macario Sakay, who revived Bonifacio's Katipunan government as opposed to Aguinaldo's.; Following the American forces taking control of Jolo on May 18, 1899, and at Zamboanga in December 1899, Moros resisted the Americans as they had the Spanish in what is termed the Moro Rebellion.		The Commonwealth of the Philippines, still under U.S. sovereignty, was inaugurated on November 15, 1935. The enabling legislation, the Tydings–McDuffie Act, provided for a ten-year period of transition to full independence.	Japan invaded the Philippines on December 8, 1941.; Philippine Executive Commission, provisional government; Japanese forces occupied the country between 1942 and 1945.; During the occupation period, the Philippines Commonwealth maintained a Government in Exile in Australia and, later, in Washington, D.C.; There was a Second Philippine Republic, which was declared independent in 1942.; An Allied campaign to defeat Japanese forces commenced on October 20, 1944, and hostilities continued until the war's end with the Japanese surrender in August 1945.On September 2, 1945, representatives of the Empire of Japan signed the Japanese Instrument of Surrender. The instrument contained language explicitly accepting the Potsdam Declaration, which contained language limiting Japanese sovereignty to the four main Japanese islands and other minor islands as might be determined.	On July 4, 1946, the United States recognized the independence of the Republic of the Philippines as a separate self-governing nation.; On October 16, 1947, the United Kingdom transferred the administration of the Mangsee Islands and the seven Philippine Turtle Islands to the Philippines. Before that the islands were under Philippine sovereignty but United Kingdom administration.		
Notes																

== See also ==
- Politics of the Philippines
  - Prehistoric Philippines
    - Precolonial barangays
      - Datus, Rajahs and Sultans
        - Datu Bangkaya
        - Datu Dinagandan
        - Rajah Lakandula
        - Rajah Humabon
        - Datu Lapu-Lapu
        - Rajah Kulambo
        - Rajah Sulayman
        - Sultan of Maguindanao
        - Sultan of Sulu
        - Datu Rodylie
        - Datu Ampatuan
        - Lapu-Lapu
        - Rajah Bendahara Kalantiaw III
        - Rajah Calambu
        - Raja Humabon
        - Rajah Lakandula
        - Rajah Suliman
        - Rajah Tupas
        - Sultan Kudarat
        - Maragtas epic
          - Datu Puti
          - Irong-irong
          - Kalantiao
      - Babaylan
        - Urduja
  - Spanish colony
    - Viceroyalty of New Spain
      - Miguel López de Legazpi
      - Guido de Lavezaris
      - Francisco de Sande
      - Gonzalo Ronquillo de Peñaloza
      - Diego Ronquillo
      - Santiago de Vera
      - Gómez Pérez Dasmariñas
      - Pedro de Rojas
      - Luis Pérez Dasmariñas
      - Francisco de Tello de Guzmán
      - Pedro Bravo de Acuña
      - Rodrigo de Vivero
      - Juan de Silva
      - Alonso Fajardo y Tenza
      - Fernándo de Silva
      - Juan Niño de Tabora
      - Juan Cerezo de Salamanca
      - Sebastián Hurtado de Corcuera
      - Diego Fajardo Chacón
      - Sabiniano Manrique de Lara
      - Diego de Salcedo
      - Juan Manuel de la Peña Bonifaz
      - Manuel de León
      - Juan de Vargas Hurtado
      - Gabriel de Curuzealegui y Arriola
      - Fausto Cruzat y Gongora
      - Domingo Zabálburu de Echevarri
      - Martín de Urzua y Arismendi
      - Fernando Manuel de Bustillo Bustamante y Rueda
      - Francisco de la Cuesta
      - Toribio José Cosio y Campo
      - Fernándo Valdés y Tamon
      - Gaspar de la Torre
      - Juan Arrechederra
      - José Francisco de Obando y Solis
      - Pedro Manuel de Arandía Santisteban
      - Miguel Lino de Ezpeleta
      - Manuel Rojo
      - Simón de Anda y Salazar
      - Francisco Javíer de la Torre
      - José Raón
      - Simón de Anda y Salazar
      - Pedro Sarrio
      - José Basco y Vargas
      - Pedro de Sarrio
      - Félix Berenguer de Marquina
      - Rafael María de Aguilar y Ponce de León
      - Mariano Fernández de Folgueras
      - Manuel Gonzalez de Aguilar
      - José Gardoqui Jaraveitia
    - Crown colony
      - Juan Antonio Martínez
      - Marinao Ricafort Palacín y Ararca
      - Pascual Enrile y Alcedo
      - Gabriel de Torres
      - Juan Crámen
      - Pedro Antonio Salazar Castillo y Varona
      - Andrés García Camba
      - Luis Lardizábal
      - Marcelino de Oraá Lecumberri
      - Francisco de Paula Alcalá de la Torre
      - Narciso Clavería y Zaldúa
      - Antonio María Blanco
        - Antonio de Urbistondo y Eguía
      - Ramón Montero y Blandino
      - Manuel Pavía y Lay
      - Ramón Montero y Blandino
      - Manuel Crespo y Cebrían
      - Fernándo Norzagaray y Escudero
      - Ramón María Solano y LLanderal
      - Juan Herrera Dávila
      - José Lemery É Ibarrola Ney y González
      - Salvador Valdés
      - Rafael de Echaque
      - Joaquín del Solar É Ibáñez
      - Juan de Lara É Irigoyen
      - José Laureano de Sanz y Posse
      - Antonio Osorio
      - Joaquín del Solar
      - José de la Gándara y Navarro
      - Manuel Maldonado
      - Cárlos María de la Torre y Nava Cerrada
      - Rafael de Izquierdo y Gutíerrez
      - Manuel Mac-crohon
      - Juan Alminos y Pe Vivar
      - Manuel Blanco Valderrama
      - José Malcampo y Monje
      - Domingo Moriones y Murillo
      - Rafael Rodríguez Arias
      - Fernando Primo de Rivera
      - Emilio Molíns
      - Joaquín Jovellar
      - Emilio Terrero y Perinat
      - Antonio Molto
      - Federico Lobaton
      - Valeriano Wéyler
      - Eulogio Despujol
      - Federico Ochando
      - Ramón Blanco
      - Camilo Polavieja
      - Basilio Agustín
      - Mario Jaudenes
      - Agustin De Los Rios
      - José de Lachambre
  - Philippine Revolution
    - La Liga Filipina
      - José Rizal
      - Marcelo H. del Pilar
      - Graciano López Jaena
      - Mariano Ponce
      - La Solidaridad
    - Katipunan
      - Andrés Bonifacio
      - Emilio Jacinto
      - Melchora Aquino
    - Republic of Biak-na-Bato
      - Emilio Aguinaldo
      - Mariano Trías
      - Baldomero Aguinaldo
    - Spanish–American War
  - American territory
    - Philippine–American War
    - US Military Government
      - Wesley Merritt
      - Elwell S. Otis
      - Arthur MacArthur Jr.
      - Adna Chaffee
    - First Philippine Republic
      - Emilio Aguinaldo
        - Apolinario Mabini
        - Pedro Paterno
        - Antonio Luna
        - Gregorio del Pilar
    - US Insular Government
      - William Howard Taft
      - Luke E. Wright
      - Henry Clay Ide
      - James Francis Smith
      - Newton W. Gilbert
      - William Cameron Forbes
      - Francis Burton Harrison
      - Charles Yeater
      - Leonard Wood
      - Eugene Allen Gilmore
      - Henry L. Stimson
      - Eugene Allen Gilmore
      - Dwight Filley Davis
      - Theodore Roosevelt Jr.
      - Frank Murphy
    - Commonwealth of the Philippines
      - Quezon, Manuel L.
      - National Defense Act of 1935
      - Sergio Osmeña
      - Bell Trade Act
    - Philippine Executive Commission
      - Masaharu Homma
      - Shizuichi Tanaka
      - Shigenori Kuroda
        - Jorge B. Vargas
    - Second Philippine Republic
      - José P. Laurel
      - Benigno Aquino Sr.
      - Benigno Ramos
  - Republic of the Philippines
    - Third Republic of the Philippines
      - Manuel Roxas
      - Elpidio Quirino
      - Ramon Magsaysay
      - Carlos P. Garcia
      - Diosdado Macapagal
    - Fourth Republic of the Philippines
      - Ferdinand Marcos
        - Imelda Marcos
      - Benigno Aquino Jr.
      - EDSA Revolution
    - Fifth Republic of the Philippines
      - Corazon Aquino
      - Fidel Ramos
      - Joseph Estrada
      - EDSA II
      - Gloria Macapagal Arroyo
      - Benigno Aquino III
      - Rodrigo Duterte
      - Bongbong Marcos

== Bibliography ==
- Agoncillo, Teodoro A. (1990), History of the Filipino People (Eighth ed.), University of the Philippines, ISBN 971-8711-06-6.
- Bautista, Lowell B. (September 3, 2009), "The Historical Context and Legal Basis of the Philippine Treaty Limits" (PDF), Aegean Review of the Law of the Sea and Maritime Law, 1: 111–139, doi:10.1007/s12180-009-0003-5, ISSN 1864-9610, S2CID 153653227, archived from the original (PDF) on October 11, 2010.
- Constantino, Renato (1975), The Philippines: A Past Revisited, vol. I, Renato Constantino, ISBN 978-971-8958-00-1.
- Elliott, Charles Burke (1917), The Philippines: To the End of the Commission Government, a Study in Tropical Democracy (PDF).
- Guevara, Sulpico, ed. (1972), The laws of the first Philippine Republic (the laws of Malolos) 1898–1899, Ann Arbor, Michigan: University of Michigan Library (English translation by Sulpicio Guevara).
- Kalaw, Maximo M. (1927), The development of Philippine politics, Oriental commercial.
- Kalaw, Maximo Manguiat (2007), The Present Government of the Philippines, Oriental commercial, ISBN 1-4067-4636-3. (Note: 1. The book cover incorrectly lists author as "Maximo M Lalaw", 2. Originally published in 1921 by The McCullough Printing Co., Manila.)
- Noland, Marcus (1990), Pacific Basin developing countries: prospects for the future, Peterson Institute, ISBN 978-0-88132-081-7.
- Peterson, Don (2007), 1898: Five Philippine Governors-General Serve Rapid Fire Terms (PDF), Philippine Philatelic Journal.
- Ricarte, Artemio (1926), The Hispano-Philippine Revolution, Yokohama This book was published by Ricarte himself, includes his memoirs on the Philippine Revolution.
- Rodell, Paul A. (2002), "Culture and customs of the Philippines", Culture and customs of Asia, Greenwood Publishing Group, ISBN 978-0-313-30415-6.
- Scott, William Henry (1992), Looking for the Prehispanic Filipino: and other essays in Philippine history, New Day Publishers, ISBN 978-971-10-0524-5.
- Titherington, Richard Handfield (1900), A history of the Spanish–American War of 1898, D. Appleton and Company.
- Tucker, Spencer C. (2009), The encyclopedia of the Spanish-American and Philippine-American wars: a political, social, and military history, ABC-CLIO, ISBN 978-1-85109-951-1.
- Villarroel, Fidel (2009), "Philip II and the "Philippine Referendum" of 1599", in Ramírez, Dámaso de Lario (ed.), Re-shaping the World: Philip II of Spain and His Time (illustrated ed.), Ateneo de Manila University Press, ISBN 978-971-550-556-7.
- Randolph, Carman Fitz (2009), The Law and Policy of Annexation, BiblioBazaar, LLC, ISBN 978-1-103-32481-1.
- Worcester, Dean Conant (1914), The Philippines: Past and Present (vol. 1 of 2), Macmillan, ISBN 1-4191-7715-X.
- Zaide, Gregorio F. (1968), The Philippine revolution, Modern Book Co.
- Zaide, Sonia M. (1994), The Philippines: A Unique Nation, All-Nations Publishing Co., ISBN 971-642-071-4.
