= Magellan (film) =

2025 historical drama film by Lav Diaz

- Theatrical release poster
- Portuguese: Magalhães
- Directed by: Lav Diaz
- Written by: Lav Diaz
- Produced by: Joaquim Sapinho; Albert Serra; Paul Soriano
- Starring: Gael García Bernal; Ronnie Lazaro; Ângela Azevedo; Amado Arjay Babon; Bong Cabrera; Hazel Orencio
- Cinematography: Lav Diaz; Artur Tort
- Edited by: Lav Diaz; Artur Tort
- Music by: Marc Verdaguer
- Production companies: Rosa Filmes; Andergraun Films; BlackCap Pictures; Lib Films
- Distributed by: Black Cap Pictures; TEN17P (Philippines)
- Release dates: May 18, 2025 (Cannes); September 10, 2025 (Philippines); December 31, 2025 (France); June 18, 2026 (Portugal); July 4, 2026 (Spain)
- Running time: 164 minutes
- Countries: Portugal; Spain; Philippines; France; Taiwan
- Languages: Portuguese; Spanish; Cebuano (Note: Many official listings and some articles from major outlets have described Magellan as a Tagalog or Filipino film. However, the cast members have stated that they learned Cebuano (Bisaya) for Magellan in an interview with Rolling Stone Philippines' Lé Baltar. The Asian Cut's Paul Enicola, a fluent speaker of Cebuano, likewise wrote that the film uses Cebuano, not Tagalog. In an article published by &Asian on 27 October 2025, writer Julienne Loreto also quoted Cebuano-speaking moviegoers who confirmed that the film's main language is Cebuano and criticised other platforms for erroneously calling it a Tagalog-language film. As of writing, the British Film Institute have issued an apology. Another interview with Lav Diaz himself, published on 9 January 2026, further confirms that the film uses Cebuano.); French
- Box office: $552,914

Magellan (Portuguese: Magalhães) is a 2025 historical epic film written and directed by Lav Diaz. The film stars Gael García Bernal as Portuguese explorer Ferdinand Magellan, and depicts Magellan's role in early-16th-century Portuguese and Spanish colonial campaigns in Southeast Asia.

The film was first announced in 2019 with Magellan's wife, Beatriz Barbosa de Magallanes, as the focus. As Diaz researched on Magellan's expedition, he shifted the film to Lapulapu, as he found that information from primary sources were not clear about him. Filming then took place in the Philippines, Portugal, and Spain from 2024 to early 2025.

Magellan premiered at the 78th Cannes Film Festival on 18 May 2025. It was theatrically released in the Philippines by TEN17P on 10 September, and was selected as the Philippines' entry to the 98th Academy Awards for Best International Feature Film. Magellan received positive reception for its slow cinema cinematography and performances. The film won the Golden Spike award at the 70th Valladolid International Film Festival.

== Plot ==
In 1511, Ferdinand Magellan participates in the Capture of Malacca under the command of Afonso de Albuquerque and is injured in battle. Magellan buys a Cebuano slave, names him Enrique and takes him back to Portugal. Magellan is nursed back to health by Beatriz Barbosa, whom he marries, and Enrique secretly continues to worship his native gods. When King Manuel I of Portugal rejects Magellan's proposal to circumnavigate the globe to find a trade route that would avoid Spanish competitors, Magellan goes to Spain, where his proposal is accepted. In 1519, he embarks on his expedition. Beatriz, who is pregnant, remains in Portugal.

Magellan faces multiple challenges during his voyage. He executes a crew member for engaging in homosexual acts, and abandons another crew member and a priest in Patagonia for mutiny. Subsequent mutinies result in the loss of several ships and brutal punishments. The prolonged voyage in the Pacific Ocean severely weakens the crew. Magellan dreams of Beatriz informing him of the child's and her own deaths.

Enrique spots the island of Cebu, lifting the crew's hopes. They go ashore and are met by the local chieftain, Rajah Humabon, and Enrique acts as a translator. Magellan presents a statuette of the Santo Niño and a gift of quince to Humabon's sick son. When the boy recovers, Humabon's wife attributes the healing to the Santo Niño, leading to celebrations in the community. Magellan and Humabon enter into a blood compact, and he persuades Humabon and his subjects to convert to Christianity. Within days, Magellan and his crew burn images of the anitos, provoking resistance by the natives. Humabon's wife, baptized as Juana, warns they will face retribution from their gods.

Humabon instructs his men to spread rumors of the existence of Datu Lapu-Lapu, a wak-wak who preys on humans. Magellan dismisses Lapu-Lapu as a phantasm but is lured to fight the creature after learning it and its subjects are defying him. Magellan and his forces are wiped out in the ensuing battle. Enrique watches Humabon and his subjects carry the corpse and detached head of one of Magellan's crew members in celebration, and he reveals in a voice-over Humabon orchestrated the attack, that Lapu-Lapu did not exist, and that he himself participated in killing most of Magellan's remaining men to regain his freedom.

== Cast ==
- Gael García Bernal as Fernão de Magalhães / Ferdinand Magellan
- Ângela Azevedo as María Caldera Beatriz Barbosa / Beatriz Magellan
- Amado Arjay Babon as Enrique de Malaca
- Ronnie Lazaro as Rajah Humabon
- Hazel Orencio as Juana
- Tomás Alves as Francisco Serrão
- Bong Cabrera as Rajah Colambu
- Brontis Jodorowsky as Archbishop Juan de Fonseca
- Baptiste Pintaux as Father De la Reina
- Dario Yazbek Bernal as Duarte Barbosa
- Roger Alan Koza as Afonso de Albuquerque
- Rafael Morais as João Carvalho

== Production ==
=== Development ===
Director Lav Diaz conceptualized the film with production company Rosa Filmes under the working title Magellan, which would portray a group of Filipinos who travel to Portugal to trace Magellan's origins in Portugal. The film aimed to "reverse the look between the coloniser and the empire". Diaz, who announced the film in 2019 as "Beatrice, The Wife", was inspired by the life of Magellan's wife Beatriz Barbosa de Magallanes, whom he married two years before he set off on the Magellan expedition. Diaz wrote the film with a focus on Beatriz, and found the dearth of text about her allowed creative liberties. During his research, Diaz realized Lapulapu may have been fictional; information on Lapulapu from primary sources was not clear and he shifted the film's focus on that aspect. The film's production team travelled to Seville and Lisbon to study archival materials and scout for filming locations.

Diaz stated his seven years of research into historical sources led him to portray Lapulapu, the datu of Mactan, as a myth rather than a historical figure. He said Lapulapu may have been created by Rajah Humabon to discourage Magellan's crew from converting more people into Christianity, and that "no one ever saw Lapulapu". Because of Lapulapu's widespread and official recognition as a historical figure in the Philippines, Diaz said his interpretation might be criticized as "revisionist".

Gael Garcia Bernal, who portrays Magellan, learned of the project from Joaquim Sapinho, met producers Sapinho and Albert Serra in Berlin to discuss his role, and later met with Diaz in Lisbon. Gael, who speaks Spanish, learned to speak Portuguese to play Magellan. Hazel Orencio, who portrays Juana, learned to speak Cebuano (Bisaya) for this film; she was helped by Sanny Joaquin, a native speaker of the language and assistant director of the film. Magellan is Diaz's first film in Spanish and Portuguese.

=== Filming ===
Principal photography took place in the towns Sampaloc and Mauban, both in Quezon, Philippines, in November 2024; this was followed by filming in southern Portugal and Cádiz, Spain. Production in the Philippines ended in December. The production used a replica of Ferdinand Magellan's ship Victoria used as a museum ship in Cádiz. During filming, Diaz fell ill with tuberculosis.

Arthur Tort, producer Albert Serra's regular collaborator, was the director of photography alongside Diaz. Scenes were filmed using multiple Panasonic Lumix GH7 digital cameras, in 4:3 aspect ratio: Tort used the same equipment in Pacifiction (2022) and Afternoons of Solitude (2024).

Filming concluded in early 2025, and post-production finished in time for the Cannes premiere. During post-production, footage was divided into two feature films – Magellan and a second film with a nine-hour cut entitled Beatriz The Wife, portraying Beatriz's side of the story.

== Release ==
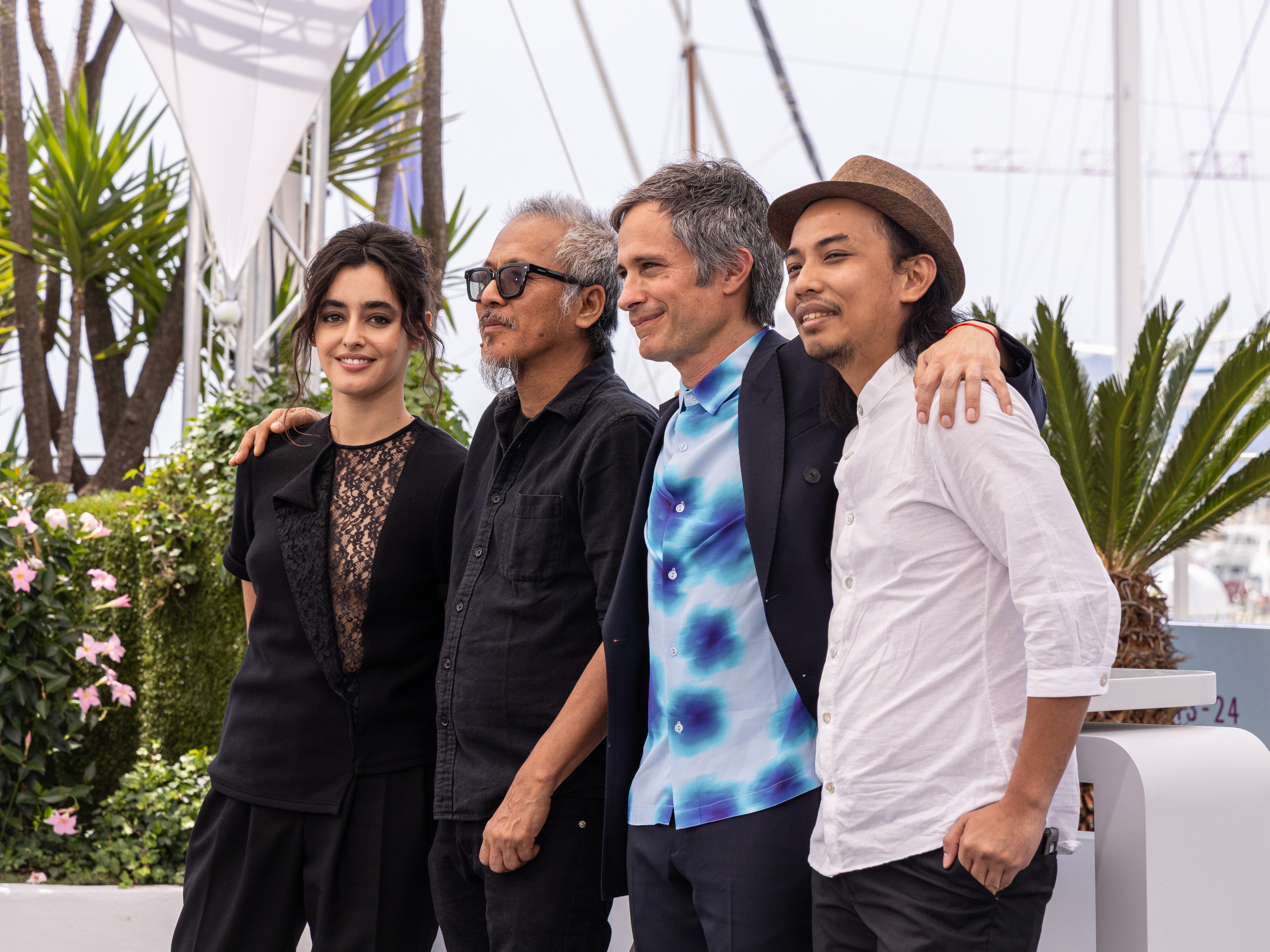
Cast and crew at the 2025 Cannes Film Festival

Magellan had its world premiere at the 2025 Cannes Film Festival on 18 May 2025. It was screened in the Cannes Premiere section, while the second film is still in post-production.

Before its world premiere, Nour Films acquired the distribution rights of the film in France. The North American distribution rights were acquired by Janus Films after the festival. In the Philippines, Ten17P holds the distribution rights of the film in the country.

The film had its Australian premiere at the 72nd Sydney Film Festival. It premiered in North America at the Toronto International Film Festival, followed by the US premiere at the New York Film Festival under the Main Slate section. It premiered in Spain at the 70th Valladolid International Film Festival. In September 2025, it was announced that the film would have its UK premiere at the BFI London Film Festival.

It was released in the Philippines on 10 September 2025. The film was originally an entry at the 2025 Asean International Film Festival in Malaysia, where Diaz was honored with a lifetime achievement award, but was barred from screening due to certain nude scenes deemed contrary to Sharia law.

Magellan was released in the United States on January 9, 2026. It is set to be released on Blu-ray and DVD by the Criterion Collection through their Criterion Premieres selection in June 2026.

== Reception ==
=== Critical response ===
On review aggregation website Rotten Tomatoes, 90% of 58 critics' reviews are positive, with an average rating of 7.5/10. The website's consensus reads: "Magellan blends Lav Diaz's slow cinema rigor with the biopic form to create a visually hypnotic, deliberately paced historical epic that immerses viewers in a spiritually charged meditation on power, mythology, and colonial ambition." Metacritic, which uses a weighted average, assigned it a score of 89 out of 100, based on 13 critics, indicating "universal acclaim".

Several reviewers generally praised Magellan as a slow cinema film. The Hollywood Reporter's Jordan Mintzer remarked that the film was "exquisitely crafted" and may be one of Diaz's most accessible works for its relatively short runtime, while emphasizing that its austere, meditative style still places it firmly within the director's body of work. Jonathan Romney of Screen International characterized it as a "sardonic, detached but compelling study", while Josh Slater-Williams of IndieWire similarly considered it as one of the director's "most fascinating achievements", calling it a "hypnotizing historical and spiritual epic" and praising its immersive qualities across decades of history, something he argued few such stories successfully achieve. Variety's Guy Lodge described the film as "stunningly mounted" and "politically rigorous", noting that it is comparatively short for Diaz, but still "no artistic compromise", with the spirit of slow cinema intact.

Other critics emphasized Magellan's visual style and scope, with particular praise for the cinematography of Tort and Diaz. The cinematography uses a tableau vivant style and chiaroscuro, which the New York Times's Manohla Dargis compares with Renaissance art. The film is also composed of "muted colors", in contrast to Diaz's prior black and white films. Several reviewers commented on the use of mundane imagery to emphasize the violence present in the film, such as a tableaux of slaughtered bodies immediately following an introductory sequence set in a "picturesque" rainforest. The cinematography prefers to depict violence only to its aftermath, which The New Yorker's Justin Chang argues it decolonizes the viewer's gaze by removing the "visceral excitement" presented in violence. Dargis also asserted that the camera's minimal movements and square framing, which "tightly focuses the viewer's gaze", also yield a strong impact when the camera moves. Moreover, the aspect ratio brings the viewers "in observation rather than spectacle" for ABS-CBN's Ralph Revelar Sarza, Clarence Tsui of the South China Morning Post considered the film's stationary shots to reflect Magellan's megalomania. The film's lack of music and melodrama presents slow cinema at its "most viscerally rigorous and patient", according to a Los Angeles Times review.

Several critics also commended the cast's performances, particularly of Gael and Babon. The AV Club called the performance the best of Bernal's career. For Romney, Garcia Bernal's "muted performance [...] vividly evokes the physical and mental wear and tear on a voyager's being." In a more critical review, Daily Tribune's Stephanie Mayo describes Magellan as "costume-driven and staged" by citing anticipable and sparse dialogue, exaggerated expressions, and cinematography that "prevents audience engagement" throughout the film. After a comment on the film's limited dialogue, The Philippine Star's Le Baltar considers that the film refuses to be expository and exhaustive. Various critics regard Magellan as a story of imperialism, a tale on mutually-assured destruction, or a discussion on the violence an invaded "must stoop to themselves" for freedom.

The film received an honorable mention in The New Yorker magazine's Best Films of 2025 list.

=== Historical accuracy ===
The portrayal of Mactan chieftain Lapulapu as a myth drew mixed reactions from historians. In an article published on The Freeman, two unnamed Cebu-based historians strongly disputed Diaz's claim and said Lapulapu's existence is attested by Enrique of Malacca and Antonio Pigafetta, and that the account of Pigafetta, who witnessed the Battle of Mactan, is reliable. Other historians, including one The Freeman cited, said Lav Diaz had taken "artistic license". At an invitational screening, Ambeth Ocampo said Diaz had made a film, not a "doctoral dissertation", and criticized the anonymous historians in The Freeman article for commenting on a film they had not seen. University of San Carlos associate professor George Borrinaga, in the same The Freeman article, said the film is a means of encouraging discussions about Lapulapu and that the lack of primary sources other than Pigafetta persuaded Diaz that Lapulapu is a myth; Borringa advised viewers to take the claim with a "grain of salt".

In Ocampo's review published on the Philippine Daily Inquirer, he noted "minor" inaccuracies, such as how the historical Santo Niño image depicted in the film was actually naked and white-skinned, while blood compact ceremonies were conducted using blood drawn from under the breast, rather than from the arms as depicted in the film.

Diaz anticipated criticisms of "historical revisionism". He said Filipinos should reconsider Rajah Humabon's place in Philippine history, and that his portrayal of events of the film is the result of his own research.

Some critics described the use of Cebuano language in Magellan as excessively modern. The Asian Cut's Paul Enicola wrote in his Toronto International Film Festival review: "More contentious is the use of Cebuano here, which occasionally veers into modern registers that jar against the historical setting". He added as a fluent Cebuano speaker, he found it distracting, though not a significant issue in his viewing experience. An article by &Asian quoted a few Cebuano-speaking moviegoers, who said the film's language is rather "anachronistic" due to its "minimal" borrowings from Hiligaynon and Tagalog.

=== Accolades ===
Award	Date of ceremony	Category	Recipient(s)	Result	Ref.
Munich International Film Festival	6 July 2025	Cinemasters	Lav Diaz	Nominated	
Valladolid International Film Festival	1 November 2025	Golden Spike	Lav Diaz	Won (Note: Award shared with The Mastermind.)	
Asia Pacific Screen Awards	27 November 2025	Best Film	Lav Diaz, Joaquim Sapinho, Marta Alves, and Albert Serra	Nominated	
Asia Pacific Screen Awards	27 November 2025	Best Cinematography	Artur Tort and Lav Diaz	Nominated	

== See also ==
- List of submissions to the 98th Academy Awards for Best International Feature Film
- List of Philippine submissions for the Academy Award for Best International Feature Film
- Lapu-Lapu, a 2002 Filipino historical film about the titular datu whose men Magellan fought in the Battle of Mactan
- 1521, a 2023 Filipino-American film about the encounter between Magellan's crew and Philippine natives
- Kidlat Tahimik, a Filipino filmmaker who often made films that meditate on Magellan's arrival in the Philippines
