= Enrique of Malacca =

Slave of Ferdinand Magellan (c. 1493 – 1521)

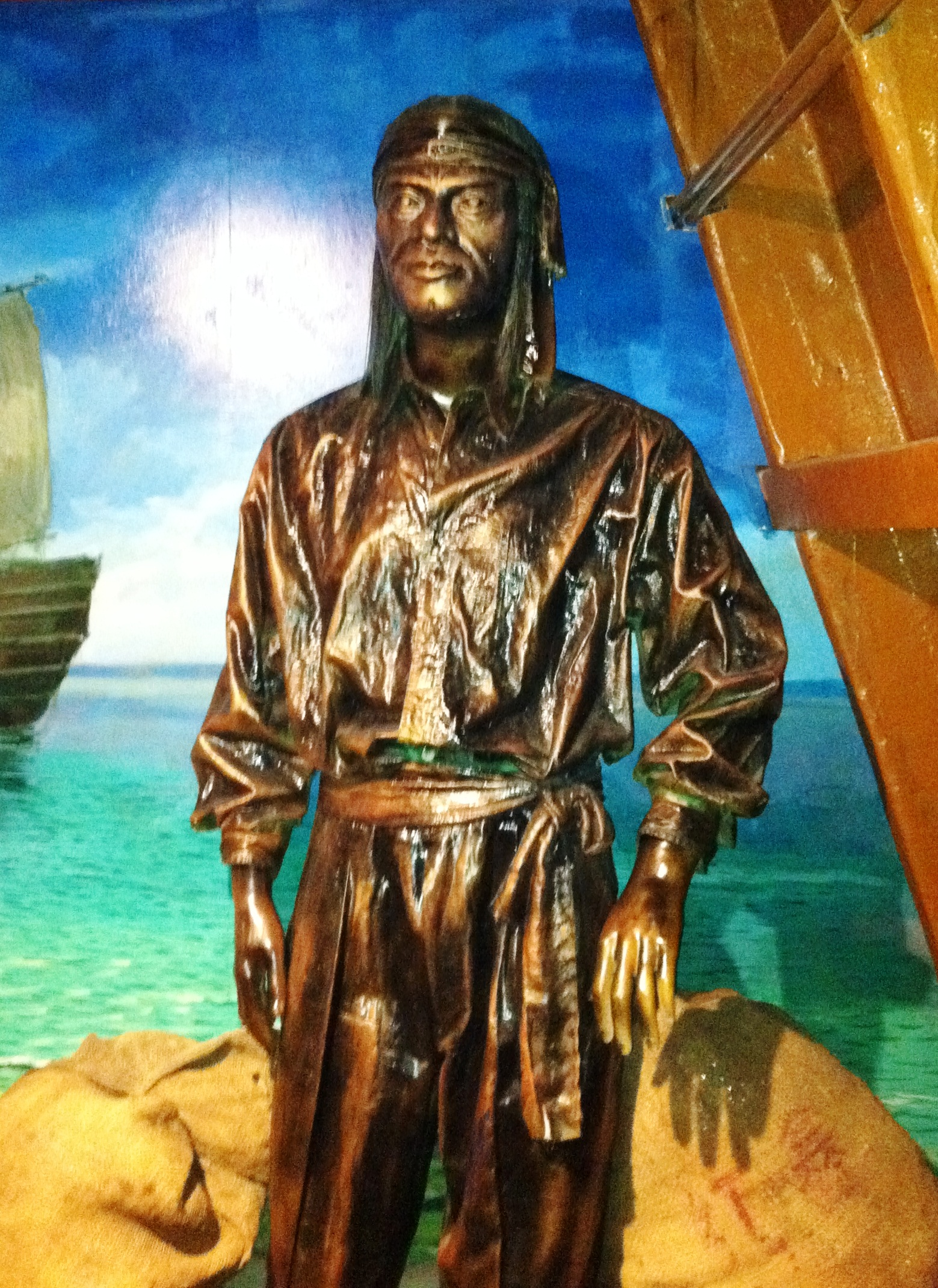
- Statue of Enrique in the Maritime Museum of Malacca, Malacca City, Malaysia
- Born: c. 1493
- Died: Unknown, 1521 or later
- Other names: Henrique, Heinrich
- Known for: Participation in first circumnavigation of Earth

Enrique of Malacca (Spanish: Enrique de Malaca; Portuguese: Henrique de Malaca) was a Malay member of the Magellan expedition who is believed to have completed the first circumnavigation of the world from 1519–1522. Enrique was Ferdinand Magellan's personal slave and interpreter, and outlived most members of the expedition including Magellan himself, but was not among the 18 survivors (out of about 270 men) who returned to Spain in September 1522, three years after they left. About a year earlier, he was left behind in Cebu in what would become the Philippines, and his final fate is unknown.

Although his exact place of birth and his whereabouts after being left by the expedition cannot be determined, both were in the same region of the world. Based on this, some historians have speculated that he could have been the first person to circumnavigate the globe, achieving this before the survivors who completed Magellan's expedition.

== Early life and enslavement ==
Magellan's will of 1519, written in preparation for the expedition, calls Enrique a baptized Christian (Catholic), more or less 26 years old and a native of Malacca where he was captured and enslaved. Antonio Pigafetta later wrote in his account of the voyage that Enrique was a Malay native of Sumatra. (Note: The city of Malacca was inhabited by various ethnicities. The founder himself was a Malay refugee from Singapura who fled from the Kingdom of Palembang in Sumatra. See Crawfurd, 1856: p. 244) Thus it can be deduced that he was probably acquired as a slave by the Portuguese explorer in 1511 at the age of around 18 years (thus born around 1493), probably in the early stages of the capture of Malacca. Magellan took him to Europe, and in 1519 he was brought along on the famous circumnavigation expedition.

When Magellan appeared before the Spanish king, he spoke of Enrique as "a slave that he had had in Malacca, because he was from those islands they called him Enrique de Malacca." Antonio Pigafetta, a participant who wrote the most comprehensive account of Magellan's voyage, called him "Henrique" (which was Hispanicised as Enrique in official Spanish documents) and also referred to him as a slave.

== Magellan expedition ==
Route taken by the expedition, with milestones marked

Enrique accompanied Magellan back to Europe and onwards on Magellan's search for a westward passage to the East Indies, and he served as an interpreter for the Spaniards. American historian Laurence Bergreen says that Enrique was believed to be a native of the Spice Islands. Magellan produced letters from a Portuguese acquaintance, Francisco Serrão, who located the Spice Islands so far to the east of Spain, that they lay in the area granted to Spain, rather than Portugal. This gave Spain an opportunity to claim the Spice Islands.

Ginés de Mafra explicitly states in his first hand account that Enrique was taken on the expedition primarily because of his ability to speak the Malay language: "He [Magellan] told his men that they were now in the land he had desired, and sent a man named Herédia, who was the ship's clerk, ashore with a Native they had taken, so they said, because he was known to speak Malay, the language spoken in the Southeast Asia Archipelago." The islands in the Philippines where Enrique spoke as interpreter and was understood by the natives included Suluan (recorded as "Zuluan"), Limasawa ("Mazaua"), and Cebu ("Zubu"). In Cebu, Magellan conversed with its ruler Rajah Humabon through Enrique, directly or indirectly as a trader from Siam was also there and relayed at least some of Humabon's words to Enrique.

== After Magellan's death ==
Magellan had provided in his will that Enrique was to be freed upon his death. But after the Battle of Mactan in which Magellan was killed and Enrique was wounded along with other survivors like Pigafetta, the new captain, Juan Sebastián Elcano revoked Enrique's freedom after about 15 minutes.

Furious, Enrique did some mistranslating between the new captain and the King of Cebu. This caused an ambush that killed 26 men, decreasing the numbers of Magellan's crew (not including Ferdinand Magellan himself) from 130 to 104.

The Genoese pilot of the Magellan expedition wrongly stated in his eyewitness account that the Spaniards had no interpreter when they returned to Cebu, because Enrique had died on Mactan along with Magellan. However, Enrique was alive on 1 May 1521, and attended a feast given by Rajah Humabon to the Spaniards. Pigafetta writes that the survivor João Serrão, who was pleading with the crew from the shore to save him from the Cebuano tribesmen, said that all those who went to the banquet were slain, except for Enrique. A discourse by Giovanni Battista Ramusio claims that Enrique warned the Chief of Subuth [sic] that the Spaniards were plotting to capture the king and that this led to the murder of Serrão and others at the banquet.

== Possibility of the actual first circumnavigation ==
Enrique accompanied Magellan on all his voyages, including the voyage that circumnavigated the world between 1519 and 1521. On 1 May he was left behind in Cebu after the treachery of Humabon, and there is nothing more said of Enrique in any document.

Presuming that he had the intention to return to his home island, if he had succeeded in returning to his home before July 1522, he would have been the first person to circumnavigate the world and return to his starting point ahead of the Magellan expedition's survivors led by Juan Sebastian Elcano. According to Maximilianus Transylvanus and Antonio Pigafetta documents, Elcano and his surviving sailors (including Pigafetta) were the first to circumnavigate the globe. Enrique is only documented to have traveled with Magellan from Malacca to Cebu in two segments—from Malacca to Portugal in 1511 and from Spain to Cebu in 1519–1521. The distance between Cebu and Malacca is 2500 km (approximately 20 degrees of longitude), which is left to complete the circumnavigation. It is not known if he ever had a chance to complete a circumnavigation, but it would have been possible: Cebu was part of the regional trade network that dealt in spices, gold, and slaves.

== Ethnicity and identity ==
In his last will, Magellan described Enrique as a "mulatto", probably only referring to his brown skin rather than how the term was applied later to biracial people with white and black ancestry, because he also called him a native of Malacca, which is part of modern Malaysia today. Alternately, Pigafetta described him as coming from Sumatra in modern-day Indonesia, located just across the Strait of Malacca. Either way, Enrique is generally accepted to have been an ethnic Malay. However, it has been asserted by Filipino historian Carlos Quirino that Enrique was himself a Visayan Filipino, a Cebuano or native of Cebu in the Philippines, on the assumption that Enrique must have conversed with the Cebuanos in their Cebuano language instead of the Malay language as attested by primary sources (the Malay language was the lingua franca of the region).

== In popular culture ==
=== Fictional works ===
In Malaysia, a fictionalized version of Enrique is known as "Panglima Awang", a name given by a historical novel author, Harun Aminurrashid in his eponymous novel titled Panglima Awang which was written in 1957 and first published in 1958 by Pustaka Melayu (under brand: Buku Punggok). According to the author, he gave Enrique the Malay name Awang to match his presumed ethnicity, while the title Panglima (English: Commander) refers to Enrique's wisdom, strength and activeness. Due to the association, "Panglima Awang" is sometimes presumed to be Enrique's actual historical birth name before he was baptized, but it is in truth unknown.

In Indonesia, a book title "Pengeliling bumi pertama adalah orang Indonesia: Enrique Maluku" (The first circumnavigator was an Indonesian: Enrique of Moluccas), written by Helmy Yahya and Reinhard Tawas, edited by Imam Hidayah has released in 2014. Moreover, Yahya continued to write the novel about Enrique Maluku with the title of "Clavis Mundi" in 2022, together with his colleagues (Utama Prastha and Donna Widjajanto, as well as research by Reinhard Tawas).

In 2021, the historical novel Enrique the Black by Singapore author Danny Jalil was published by Penguin Random House SEA. The book depicts a fictionalized account of Enrique as a Malay teenager who was taken by Ferdinand Magellan and forced into slavery, later playing a pivotal role as an interpreter on the journey to the Moluccas Spice Islands, where the inhabitants speak the Malay language.

=== Depictions in popular culture ===
- Portrayed by Oscar Obligacion in the 1955 Filipino film Lapu-Lapu
- Portrayed by Julio Diaz in the 2002 Filipino film Lapu-Lapu
- Portrayed by Kidlat Tahimik in his 2010 Filipino short film Memories of Overdevelopment, 1980–2010
- Portrayed by Jon Samaniego in the 2019 Spanish CG animated film Elcano & Magellan: The First Voyage Around the World
- Portrayed by Colin Ryan in the 2022 Spanish miniseries Boundless
- Portrayed by Amado Arjay Babon in the 2025 Lav Diaz film Magellan

== See also ==
- Lapulapu
- List of slaves
- Magellan's circumnavigation

== Publications ==
- Bergreen, Laurence (2003). Over the Edge of the World : Magellan's terrifying circumnavigation of the globe (1st ed.). New York: William Morrow and Company. ISBN 0-06-621173-5.
- Blair, Emma Helen and Robertson, James Alexander, The Philippine Islands 1493-1898 (55 vols, Cleveland, 1901-1907); abbreviated BR in citations.
- Jesús, Vicente Calibo de, Mazaua, Magellan's Lost Harbor (2004)
- Fry, Stephen, The Book of General Ignorance (London, 2006)
- Genoese Pilot, Navegaçam e vyagem que fez Fernando de Magalhães de Seuilha pera Maluco no anno de 1519 annos In: Collecção de noticias para a historia e geografia das nações ultramarinas, que vivem nos dominios Portuguezes, ou lhes sao visinhas (Lisbon, 1826) pp. 151–176
- Kelsey, Harry (2016). The First Circumnavigators : Unsung Heroes of the Age of Discovery. New Haven: Yale University Press. ISBN 978-0-300-22086-5. OCLC 950613571.
- Mafra, Ginés de, Libro que trata del descubrimiento y principio del Estrecho que se llama de Magallanes (1543), critical edition by Antonio Blazquez and Delgado Aguilera (Madrid, 1920) pp. 179–212
- Maximilian Transylvanus, De Moluccis insulis (1523) in: The First Voyage (Manila: Filipiniana Book Guild, 1969: pp. 103–130
- Morison, Samuel Eliot, The European Discovery of America: The Southern Voyages 1492-1616 (New York, 1974)
- Parr, Charles McKew, So Noble a Captain: The Life and Times of Ferdinand Magellan (New York, 1953)
- Pigafetta, Antonio, Magellan’s Voyage (1524)
  - 1524a. facsimile edition of Nancy-Libri-Phillipps-Beinecke-Yale codex, vol. II (New Haven, 1969)
  - 1524b. Primo viaggio intorno al globo terracqueo, ossia ragguaglio della navigazione...fatta dal cavaliere Antonio Pigafetta...ora publicato per la prima volta, tratto da un codice MS. Della biblioteca Ambrosiana di Milano e corredato di note da Carlo Amoretti. Milan 1800.
  - 1524c. Il primo viaggio intorno al globo di Antonio Pigafetta. In: Raccolta di Documenti e Studi Publicati dalla. Commissione Colombiana. Andrea da Mosto (ed. and tr.). Rome 1894.
  - 1524d. Le premier tour du monde de Magellan. Léonce Peillard (ed. and transcription of Ms. fr. 5650). France 1991.
  - 1524e. Magellan’s Voyage, 3 vols. James Alexander Robertson (ed. and tr. of Ambrosian). Cleveland 1906.
  - 1524f. Magellan’s Voyage: A Narrative Account of the First Circumnavigation. R.A. Skelton (ed. and tr. of Yale ms.). New Haven 1969.
  - 1524g. *of Ms. fr. 5650 and Ambrosian ms.). London 1874.
  - 1523h. The Voyage of Magellan: The Journal of Antonio Pigafetta. Paula Spurlin Paige (tr. of Colínes edition). New Jersey 1969.
  - 1524i. Il Primo Viaggio Intorno Al Mondo Con Il Trattato della Sfera. Facsimile edition of Ambrosian ms. Vicenza 1994.
  - 1524j. The First Voyage Around the World (1519-1522). Theodore J. Cachey Jr. (ed. based on Robertson’s tr.) New York 1995.
  - 1524k. Pigafetta: Relation du premier voyage autour du monde...Edition du texte français d’après les manuscripts de Paris et de Cheltenham. Jean Denucé (text transcribed from Ms. 5650, collating Mss. Ambrosiana, Nancy-Yale and 24224 in notes.) Antwerp 1923.
- Quirino, Carlos, "The First Man Around the World Was a Filipino" In: Philippines Free Press, 28 December 1991. --"Pigafetta: The First Italian in the Philippines." In: Italians in the Philippines, Manila: 1980. -- "Enrique." In: Who's Who in the Philippines. Manila: Pp. 80–81.
- Ramusio, Gian Battista, La Detta navigatione per messer Antonio Pigafetta Vicentino (1550) In: Delle navigationi e viaggi... (Venice) pp. 380–98
- Torodash, Martín, 'Magellan Historiography' In: Hispanic American Historical Review, vol. LI (1970), pp. 313–335
- Zweig, Stefan, Conqueror of the Seas: The Story of Magellan (New York, 1938)
