= Treaty of Cebu (1565) =

1565 peace treaty between Spain and Cebu

The Treaty of Cebu is a peace treaty signed on June 4, 1565 between Miguel López de Legazpi, representing King Philip II of Spain, and Rajah Tupas of Cebu. The treaty effectively created Spanish suzerainty over Cebu and started the Spanish colonization of the Philippines until 1898.

Legazpi had sailed from Mexico on November 20, 1564 with a fleet of four ships: San Pedro (the flagship), San Pablo, San Juan de Letran and San Lucas and a force of several hundred conquistadors. The expedition reached the Philippines in January 1565 and went ashore in Samar, Leyte, Limasawa, Bohol, and Negros to make blood compacts, claim possession for Spain, and seize or barter foodstuffs.

On April 15, 1565, the expedition anchored in Cebu, where Rajah Tupas had treated with Ferdinand Magellan in 1521 as representative of Rajah Humabon. (Note: Tupas was Humabon's nephew, and was married to his eldest child (a typical Malay arrangement at the time); Legaspi mistakenly thought that he was Humabon's son.) An envoy went ashore seeking to make a pact with Tupas who, having heard of the return of the Spaniards, evacuated the town and relocated to the interior of the island. Unable to treat with Tupas, the Spanish envoy announced that the Cebuanos had submitted to Spanish suzerainty 40 years before and were rebellious Spanish subjects. The Spanish sacked the town and began construction of a stockaded camp and took possession of the whole island of Cebu in the name of Spain. Around May 8, Tupas presented himself at the Spanish fort and agreed to formalize a treaty. After some delay, the treaty was formalized on July 3, 1565.

Historian William Henry Scott characterizes the treaty as "... actually the terms of an unconditional surrender. ... a kind of prototype of the unequal treaties which western nations were to fasten on Oriental peoples for the next three centuries."
