= Republic of Biak-na-Bato =

Government during the Philippine Revolution

Republic of the Philippines Republika ng Pilipinas (Tagalog)
- 1897
- Flag Seal

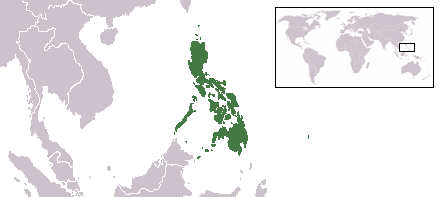
- Territory claimed by the Republic of Biak-na-Bato in Asia
- Status: Unrecognized state
- Capital: San Miguel
- Official languages: Tagalog
- Religion: Roman Catholicism, Islam
- Government: Revolutionary republic
- President
  - 1897: Emilio Aguinaldo
- Vice President
  - 1897: Mariano Trías
- Historical era: Philippine Revolution
  - Establishment: November 1, 1897
  - Pact of Biak-na-Bato: December 14, 1897
- Currency: Peso
Preceded by	Succeeded by
Captaincy General of the Philippines; Tejeros Government	Captaincy General of the Philippines; Central Executive Committee

The Republic of Biak-na-Bato (Tagalog: Republika ng Biak-na-Bato) was the second revolutionary republican government led by Emilio Aguinaldo during the Philippine Revolution that referred to itself as the Republic of the Philippines (Tagalog: Republika ng Pilipinas) and was seated in what is now Biak-na-Bato National Park. The current designation was adopted by historians to avoid confusion with the name of the current Philippine government, which also refers to itself as the Republic of the Philippines, and with other past Philippine governments using the same designation.

The Biak-na-Bato republic lasted just over a month. It was disestablished by a peace treaty signed by Aguinaldo and the Spanish Governor-General, Fernando Primo de Rivera, which included provisions for the exile of Aguinaldo and key associates to Hong Kong.

== Background ==
The Republic of Biak-na-Bato was one of a number of Filipino revolutionary states that were formed to expel the Spanish colonial regime in the Philippines but were not able to receive international recognition. It was preceded and succeeded by two similarly unrecognized states: the Tejeros government and the Central Executive Committee.

== Government ==
The constitution of the Republic of Biak-na-Bato was written by Felix Ferrer and Isabelo Artacho, who copied the Cuban Constitution of Jimaguayú nearly word-for-word. It provided for the creation of a Supreme Council, which was created on November 1, 1897, with the following officers having been elected:

Position	Name
President	Emilio Aguinaldo
Vice-President	Mariano Trías
Secretary of Foreign Affairs	Antonio Montenegro
Secretary of War	Emiliano Riego de Dios
Secretary of the Interior	Isabelo Artacho
Secretary of the Treasury	Baldomero Aguinaldo

== History ==
The initial concept of the republic began during the latter part of the Philippine Revolution, when the now-undisputed leader of the revolution, Emilio Aguinaldo, became surrounded by Spanish forces at his headquarters in Talisay, Batangas. Aguinaldo slipped through the Spanish cordon and, with 500 picked men, proceeded to Biak-na-Bató ("Cleft Rock"; in modern Filipino: Biyak-na-Bato), a wilderness area at the town of San Miguel (now parts of San Miguel, San Ildefonso, and Doña Remedios Trinidad in Bulacan). When news of Aguinaldo's arrival there reached the towns of central Luzon, men from the Ilocos provinces, Nueva Ecija, Pangasinan, Tarlac, and Zambales renewed their armed resistance against the Spanish.

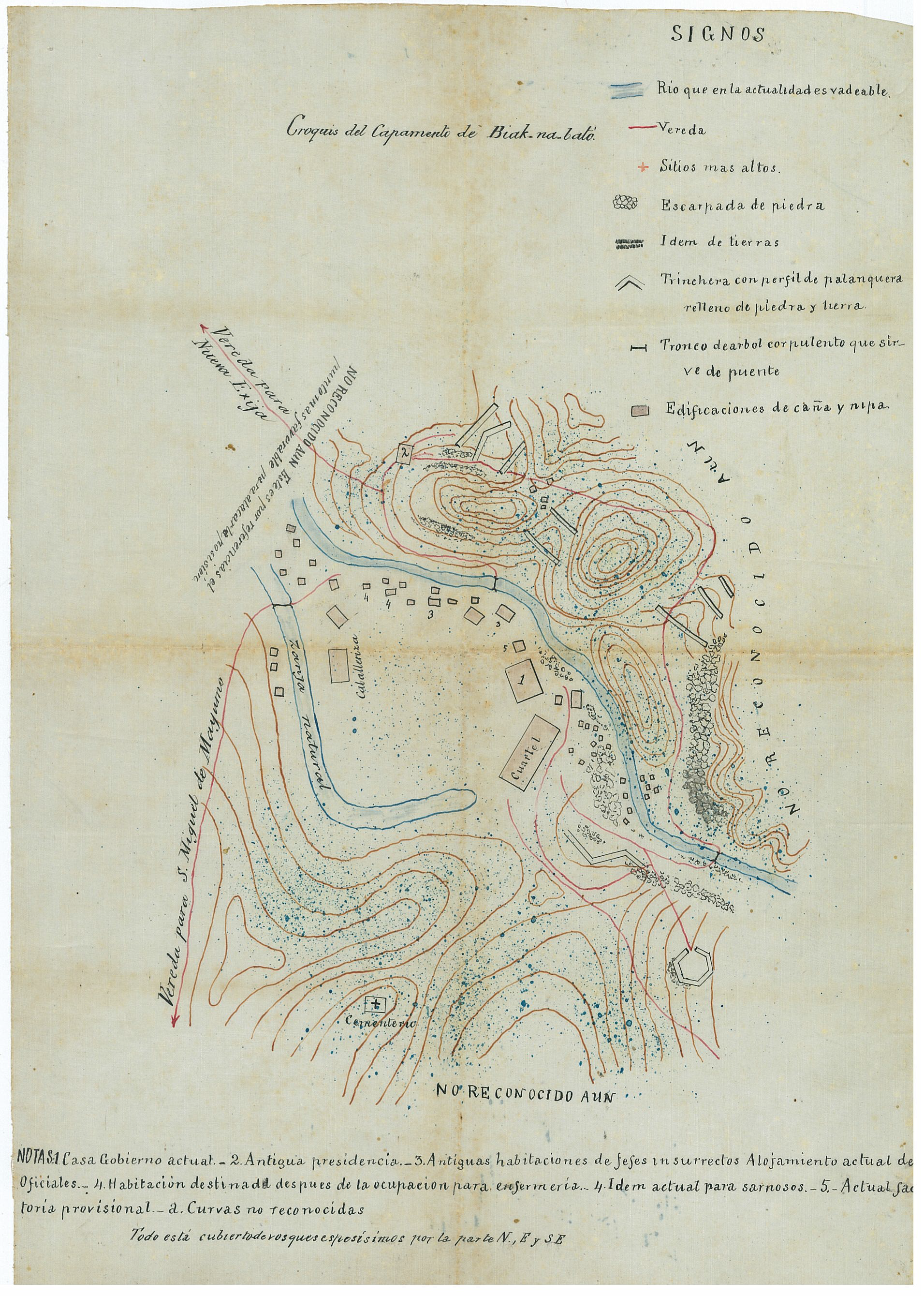
A hand-drawn Spanish military map of Emilio Aguinaldo's headquarters at Biak-na-bato (ca. 1897)

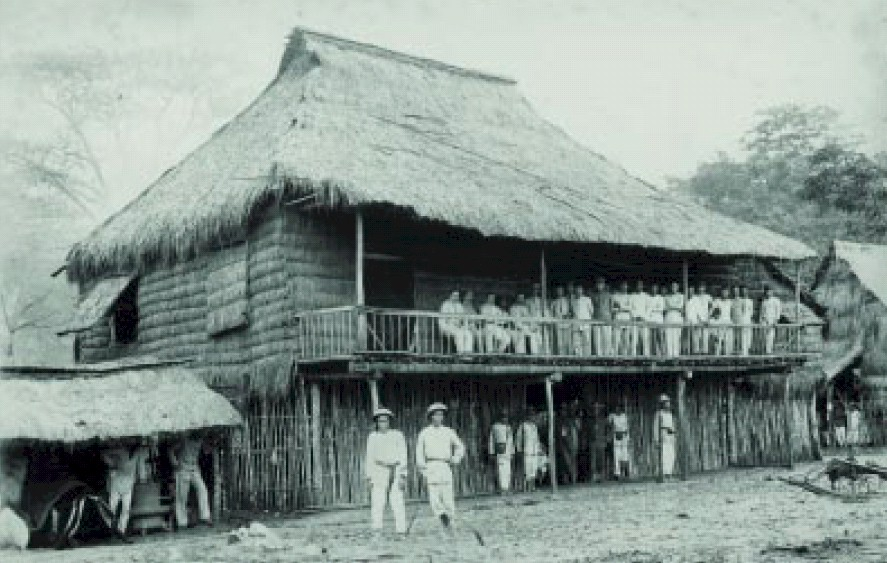
Revolutionary camp at Biak-na-Bato.

Unable to persuade the revolutionaries to give up their arms, Governor-General Primo de Rivera issued a decree on July 2, 1897, which prohibited inhabitants from leaving their villages and towns. Contrary to his expectations, they continued fighting. Within days, Aguinaldo and his men planned the establishment of a republic. Aguinaldo issued a proclamation from his hideout in Biak-na-Bato entitled "To the Brave Sons of the Philippines", in which he listed his revolutionary demands as:

1. the expulsion of the Friars and the return to the Filipinos of the lands which they had appropriated for themselves;
2. representation in the Spanish Cortes;
3. freedom of the press and tolerance of all religious sects;
4. equal treatment and pay for Peninsular and Insular civil servants;
5. abolition of the power of the government to banish civil citizens;
6. legal equality of all persons.

On November 1, 1897, the provisional constitution for the Biak-na-Bato Republic was signed. The preamble of the constitution included the statement that:

The separation of the Philippines from the Spanish monarchy and their formation into an independent state with its own government called the Philippine Republic has been the end sought by the Revolution in the existing war, begun on the 24th of August, 1896; and therefore, in its name and by the power delegated by the Filipino people, interpreting faithfully their desires and ambitions, we, the representatives of the Revolution, in a meeting at Biac-na-bato, Nov. 1st. 1897, unanimously adopt the following articles for the Constitution of the State.

By the end of 1897, Governor-General Primo de Rivera had accepted the impossibility of quelling the revolution by force of arms. In a statement to the Cortes Generales, he said, "I can take Biak-na-Bato, any military man can take it, but I can not answer that I could crush the rebellion." Desiring to make peace with Aguinaldo, he sent emissaries to Aguinaldo seeking a peaceful settlement. Nothing was accomplished until Pedro Paterno, a lawyer from Manila, volunteered to act as a negotiator.

On August 9, 1897, Paterno proposed a peace based on reforms and amnesty to Aguinaldo. In succeeding months, practicing shuttle diplomacy, Paterno traveled back and forth between Manila and Biak-na-Bato, carrying proposals and counterproposals. Paterno's efforts led to a peace agreement called the Pact of Biak-na-Bato. This consisted of three documents, the first two being signed on December 14, 1897, and the third being signed on December 15, effectively ending the Republic of Biak-na-Bato.

In 1899, Aguinaldo wrote in retrospect that the principal conditions of the pact were:

(1) That I would, and any of my associates who desired to go with me, be free to live in any foreign country. Having fixed upon Hongkong as my place of residence, it was agreed that payment of the indemnity of $MXN800,000 (Note: The funds were denominated in Mexican dollars, which were worth at the time about 50 US cents — equivalent to about $19.35 today.) should be made in three installments, namely, $MXN400,000 when all the arms in Biak-na-Bató were delivered to the Spanish authorities; $MXN200,000 when the arms surrendered amounted to eight hundred stand; the final payment to be made when one thousand stand of arms shall have been handed over to the authorities and the Te Deum sung in the Cathedral in Manila as thanksgiving for the restoration of peace. The latter part of February was fixed as the limit of time wherein the surrender of arms should be completed.

(2) The whole of the money was to be paid to me personally, leaving the disposal of the money to my discretion and knowledge of the understanding with my associates and other insurgents.

(3) Prior to evacuating Biak-na-Bató the remainder of the insurgent forces under Captain-General Primo de Rivera should send to Biak-na-Bató two General of the Spanish Army to be held as hostages by my associates who remained there until I and a few of my compatriots arrived in Hongkong and the first installment of the money payment (namely, four hundred thousand dollars) was paid to me.

(4) It was also agreed that the religious corporations in the Philippines be expelled and an autonomous system of government, political and administrative, be established, though by special request of General Primo de Rivera these conditions were not insisted on in the drawing up of the Treaty, the General contending that such concessions would subject the Government to severe criticism and even ridicule.

== Legacy ==
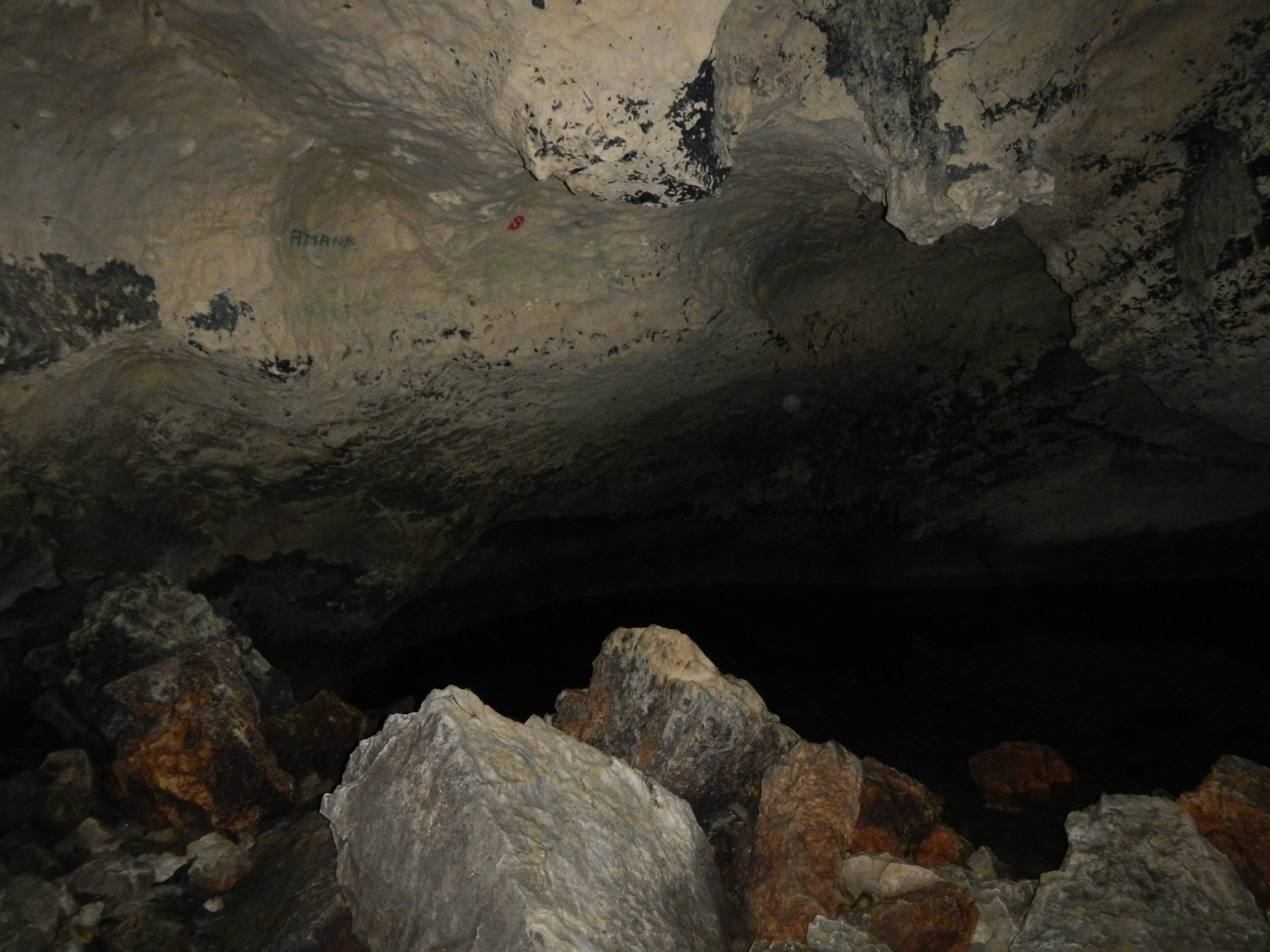
Emilio Aguinaldo Cave at the Park (site of his hideout chair made of stone)

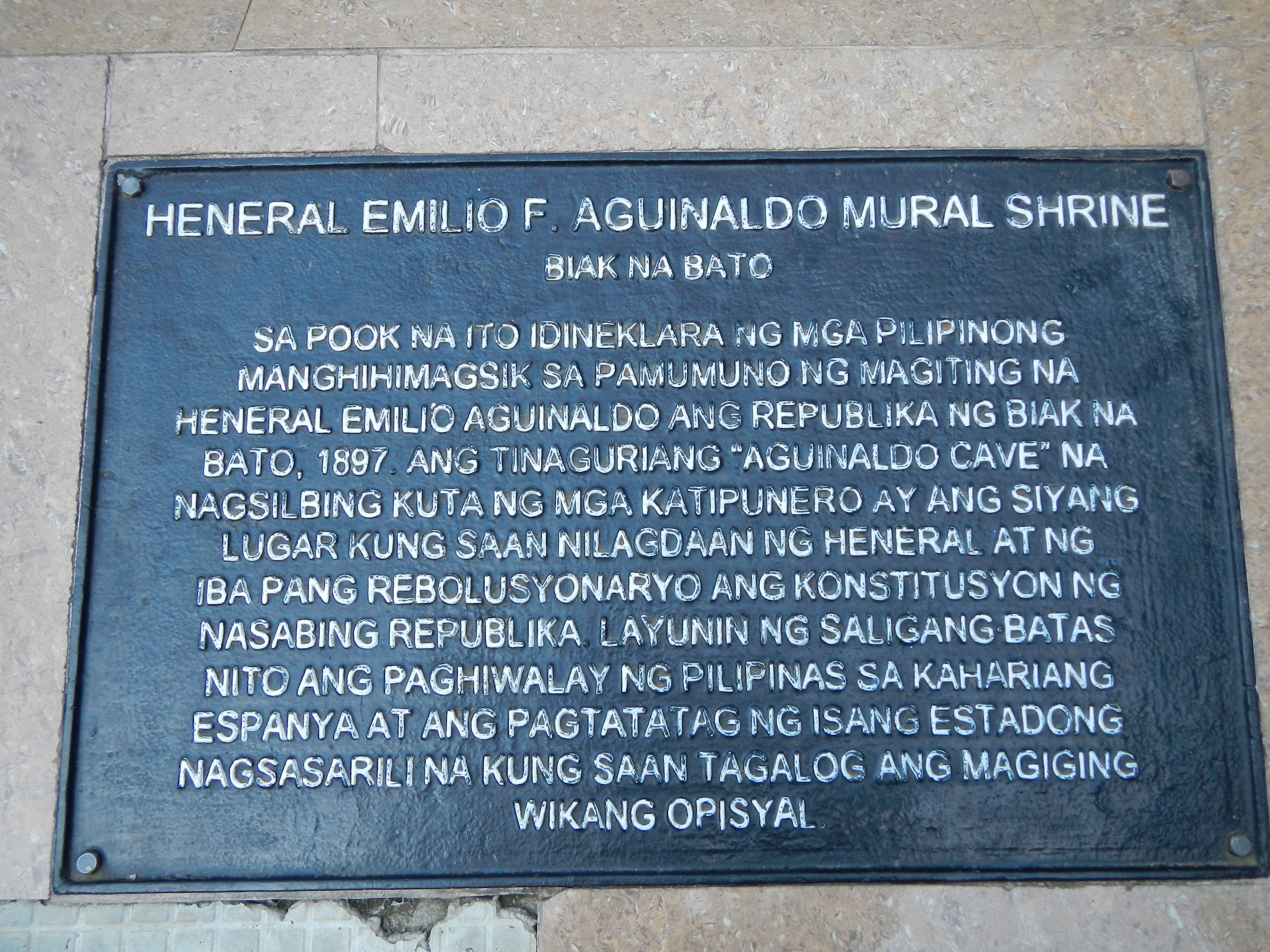
The Historical Marker

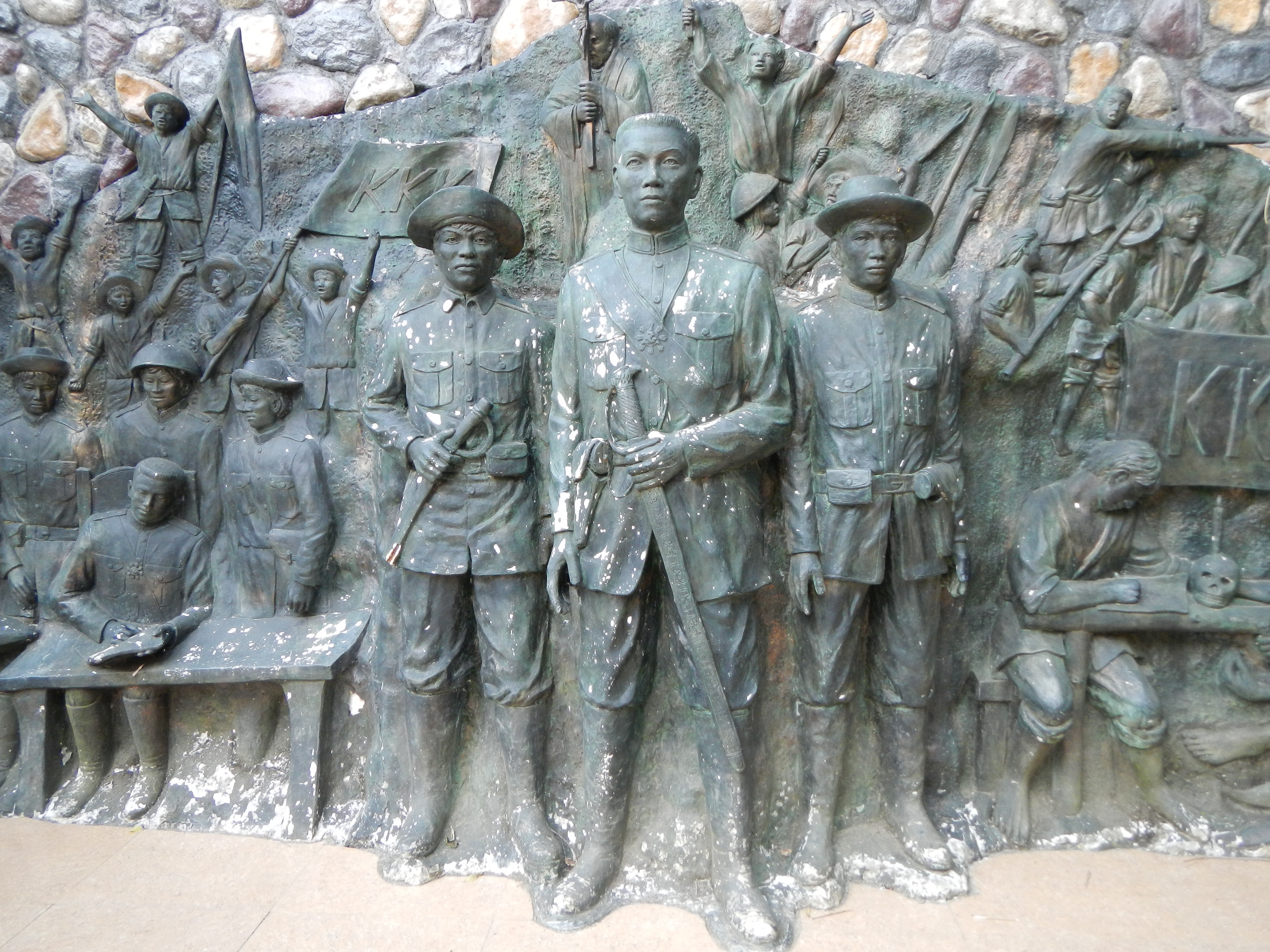
Aguinaldo Mural - Constitution of Biak-na-Bato (1897)

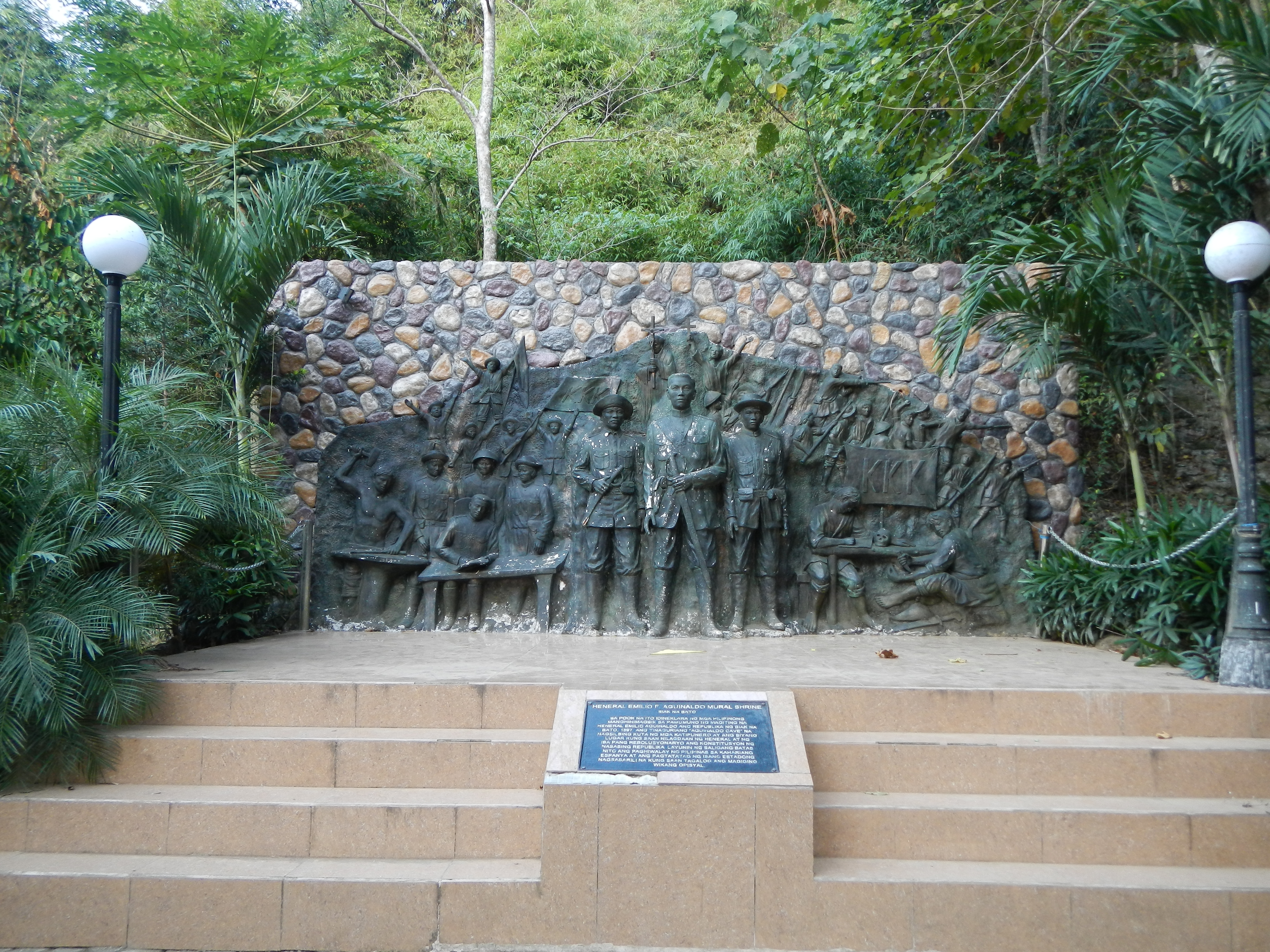
Mural facade - Shrine

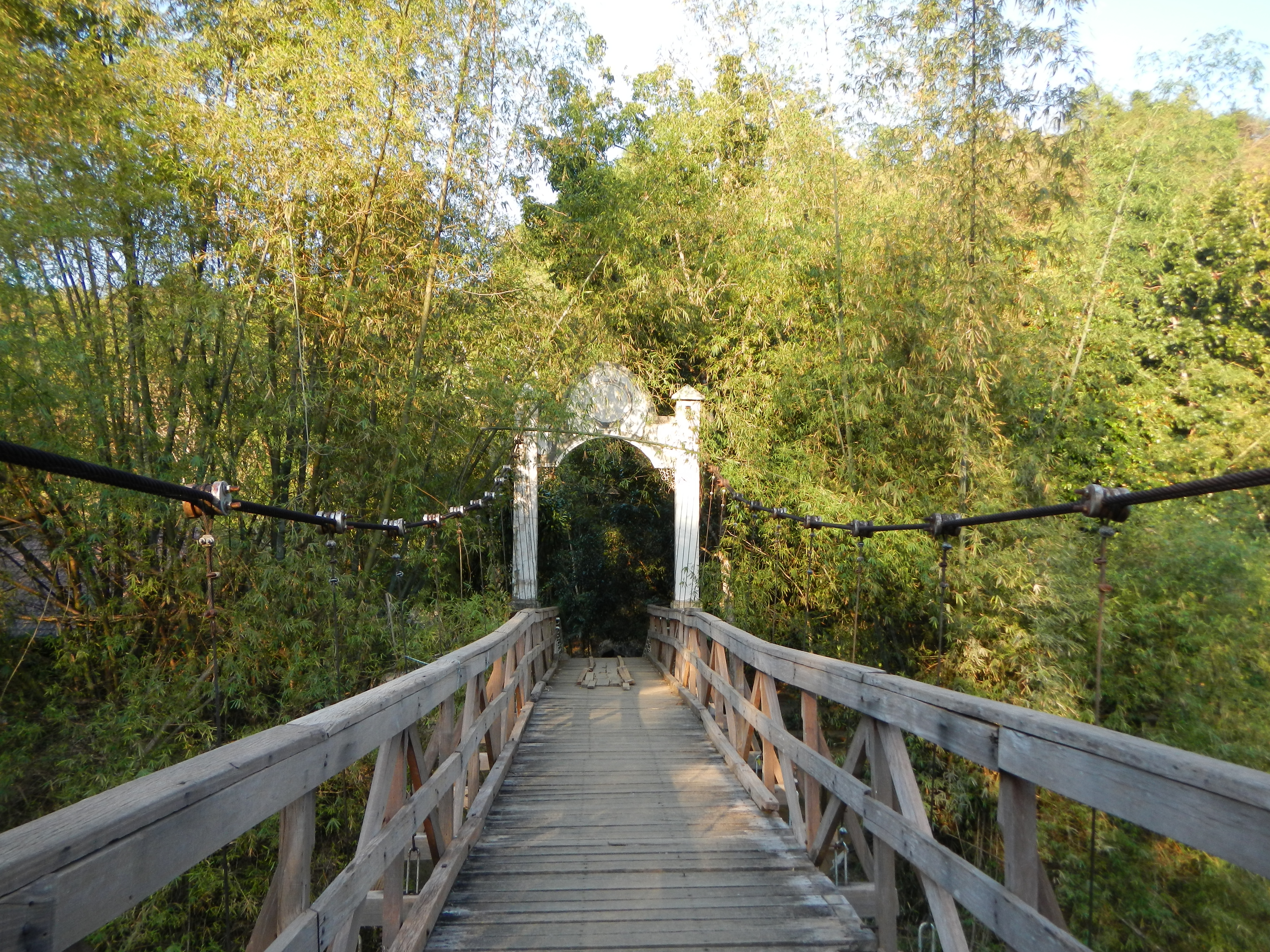
Aguinaldo passed the Hanging Bridge

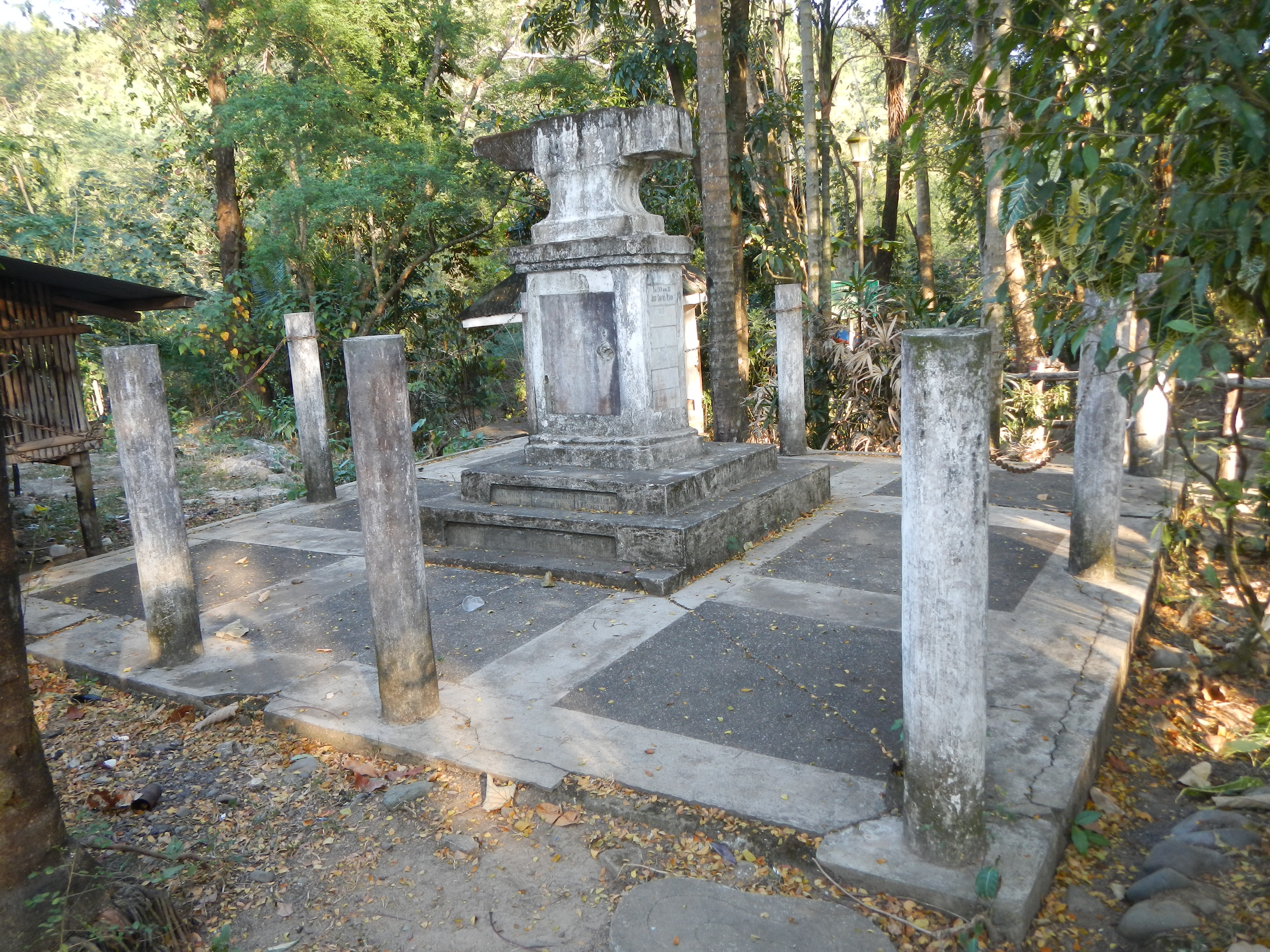
Memorial (Aguinaldo's men used the Pandayan (forge) for their weapons, arms)

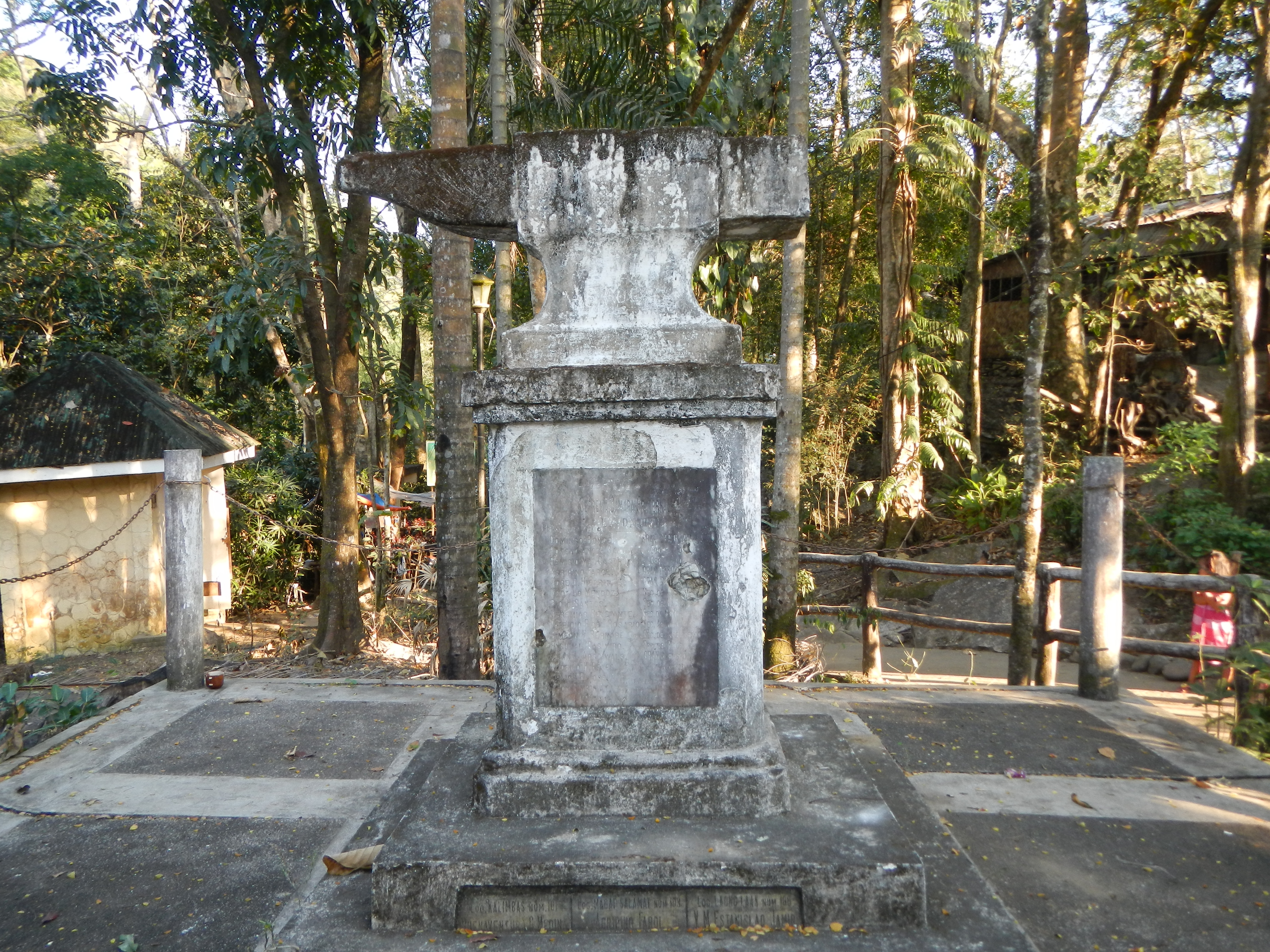
Facade

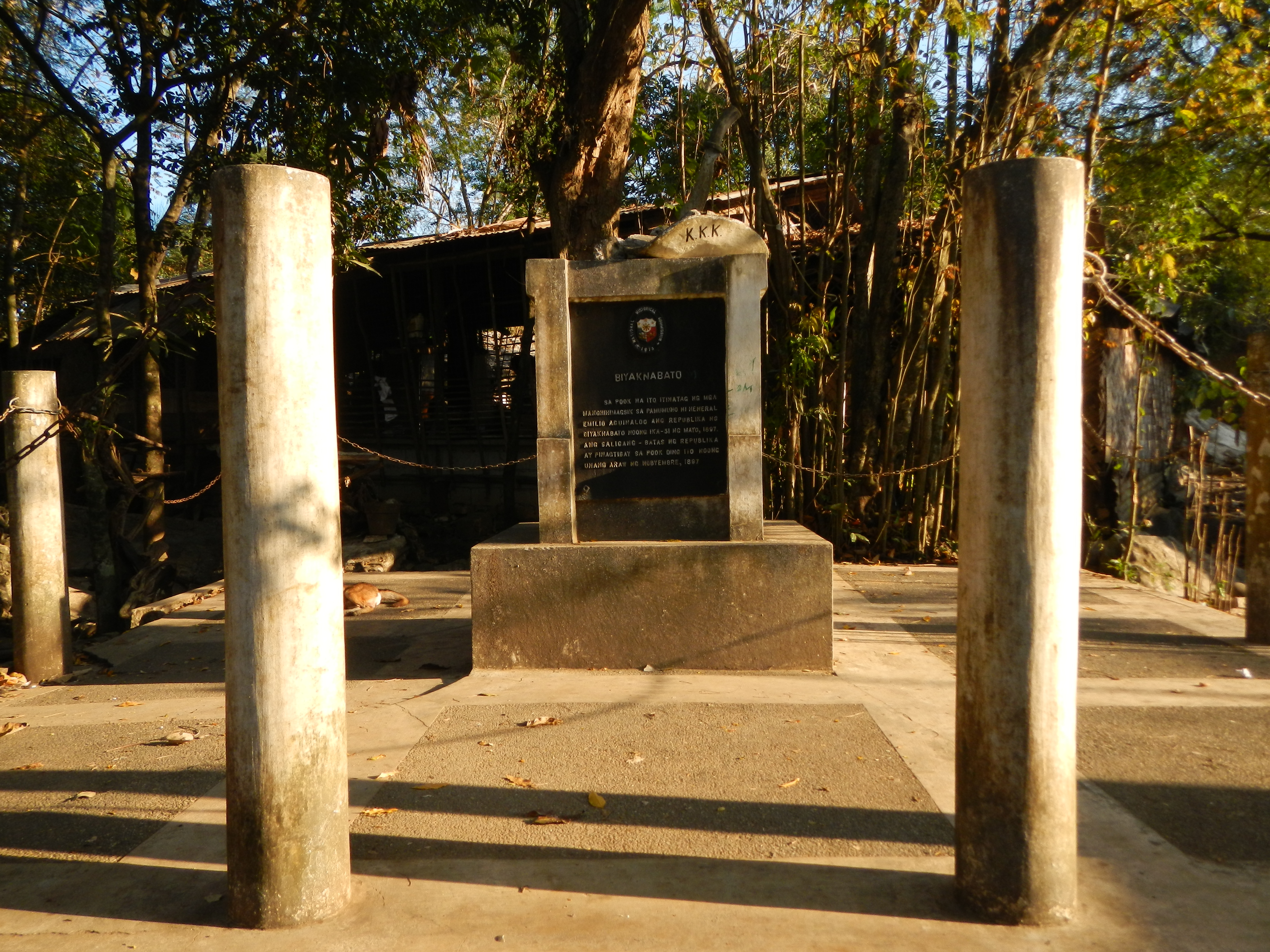
Facade of the Monument, Memorial-Marker of the Pact

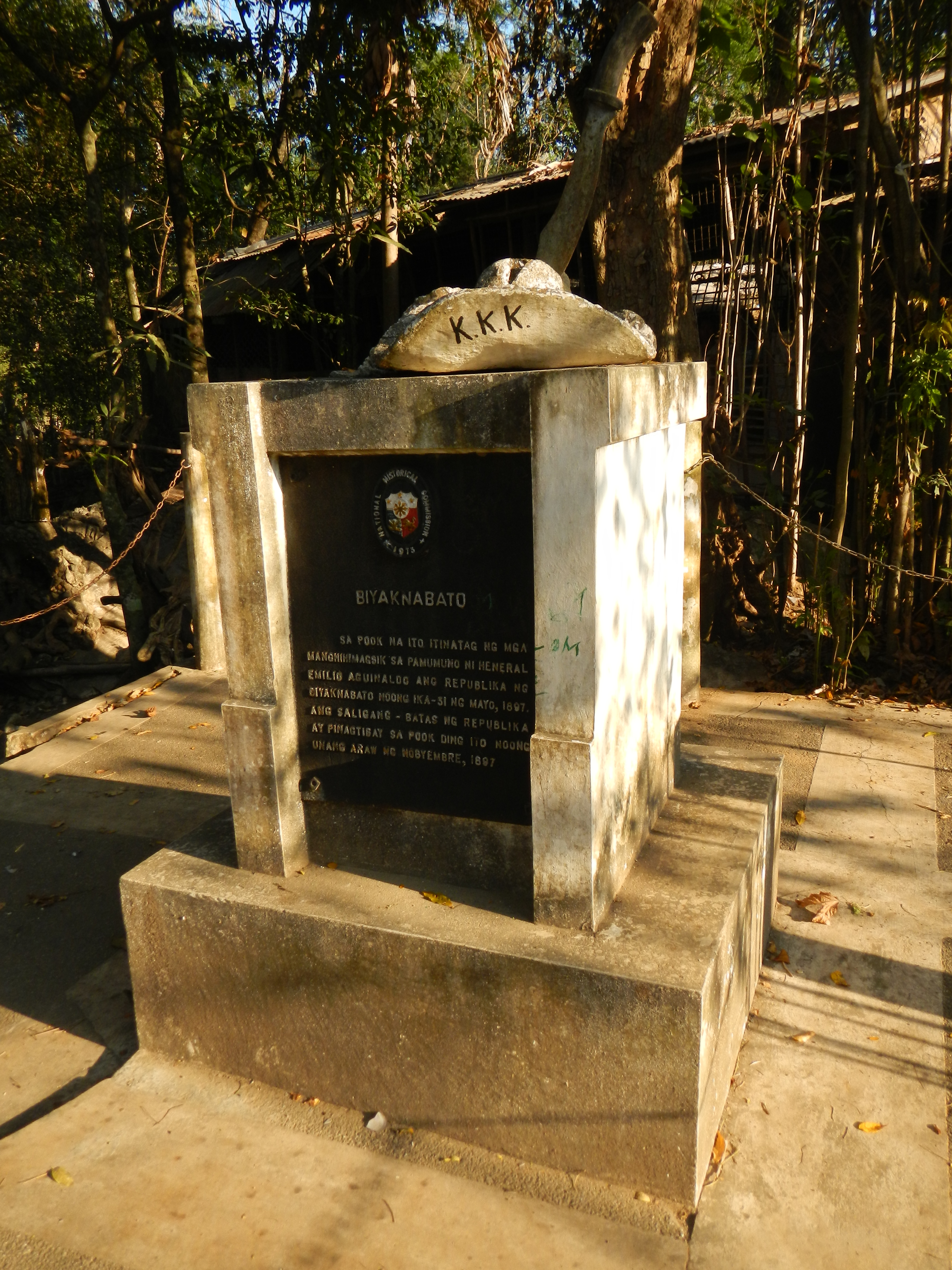
The Memorial

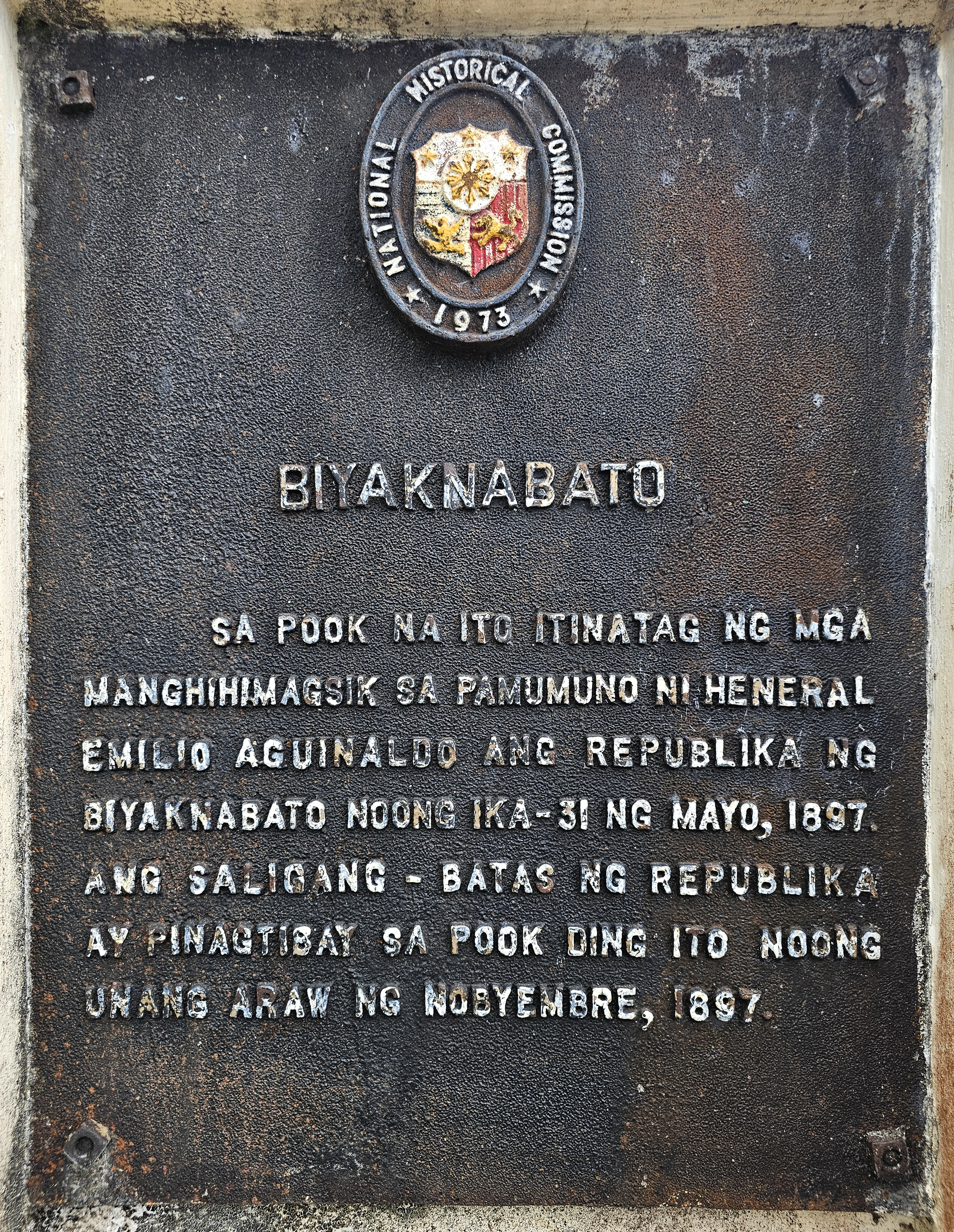
NHI Marker, 1973 Biak-na-Bato Memorial

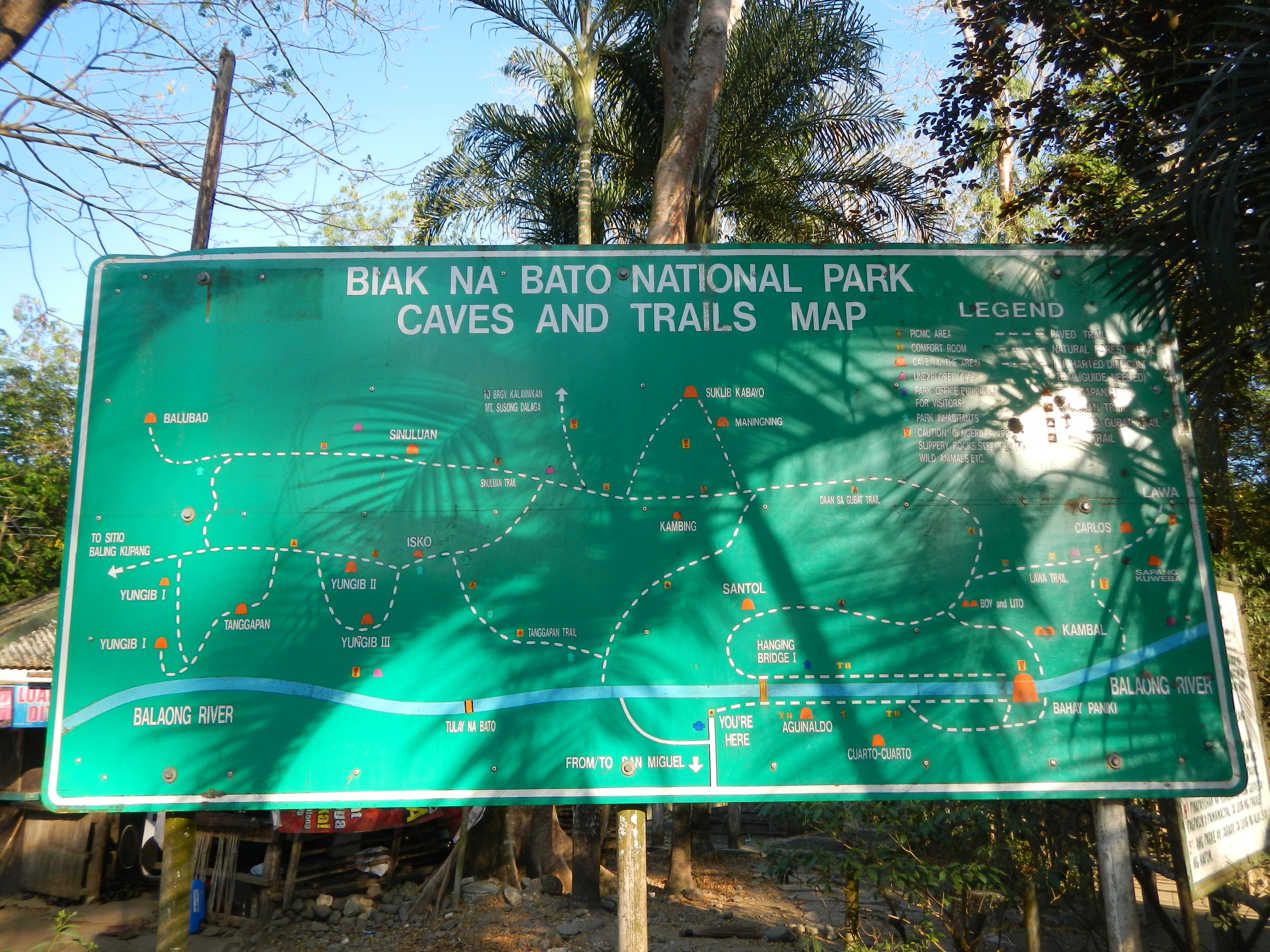
Biak-na-Bato National Park Map of Emilio Aguinaldo's Cave and protected areas

On November 16, 1937, a 2,117-hectare block in the Biak-na-Bato area was declared a national park by Manuel L. Quezon in honor of the republic. In the 1970s, Ferdinand Marcos issued orders guiding mineral prospecting and exploitation on government reservations, impacting the park's boundaries. On April 11, 1989, Corazon Aquino issued Proclamation No. 401, which re-defined the boundaries of the Biak-na-Bato National Park. The proclamation set aside 952 hectares (3.68 sq mi) as a mineral reservation, 938 hectares (3.62 sq mi) as a watershed reservation, and 480 hectares (1.9 sq mi) as a forest reserve.

== See also ==
- List of unofficial presidents of the Philippines
- Political history of the Philippines

== Notes and references ==
=== Sources ===
- Agoncillo, Teodoro C. (1990) [1960], History of the Filipino People (8th ed.), Quezon City: Garotech Publishing, ISBN 971-8711-06-6
- Aguinaldo, Emilio (1899), "True Version of the Philippine Revolution", Authorama Public Domain Books
- Zaide, Sonia M. (1994), The Philippines: A Unique Nation, All-Nations Publishing Co., ISBN 971-642-071-4
