= 1897 Philippine Supreme Council elections =

On November 1, 1897, the Republic of Biak-na-Bato was established in the cave of Biak-na-Bato, San Miguel de Mayumo, Bulacan. A special election was called for the new Supreme Council to oversee the newly established government on November 2, 1897 in the Philippines.

== Results ==
The election results were as follows:

Position	Name
President	Emilio Aguinaldo
Vice-President	Mariano Trías
Secretary of Foreign Affairs	Antonio Montenegro
Secretary of War	Emiliano Riego de Dios
Secretary of the Interior	Isabelo Artacho
Secretary of the Treasury	Baldomero Aguinaldo

== Pact of Biak-na-Bato ==
The official flag of the Biak-na-Bato government

On December 14, 1897, the Pact of Biak-na-Bato was signed. Under the pact, President Emilio Aguinaldo agreed to end hostilities and to exile himself and the revolutionary leadership, in exchange for amnesty and cash 'indemnities' in the amount of $MXN800,000. (Note: The Mexican dollar at the time was worth about 50 US cents, equivalent to about $19.35 today.) Aguinaldo took the money offered and, along with 34 other leaders of the rebellion, went into exile in Hong Kong. The 1897 Philippine Supreme Council elections were overseen by President Emilio Aguinaldo and Vice President Mariano Trias along with other Supreme Council officials, including Antonio Montenegro for Foreign Affairs, Isabelo Artacho for the Interior, Baldomero Aguinaldo for the Treasury, and Emiliano Riego de Dios for War.
