= Hazel Orencio =

Filipina character actress

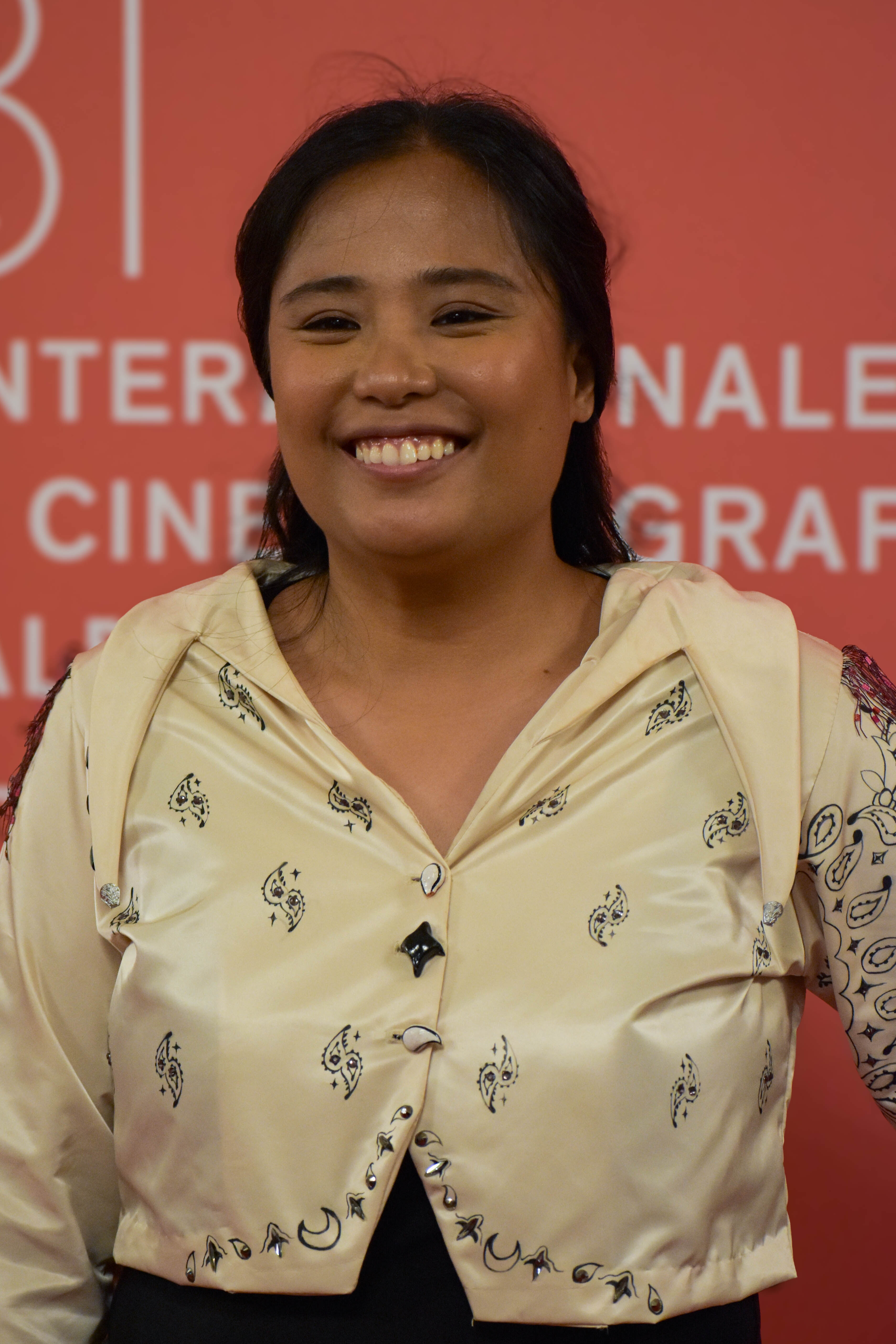
- Orencio at the 81st Venice International Film Festival in 2024
- Born: Hazel Tapales Orencio; September 21, 1986 (age 38); Antipolo, Rizal, Philippines
- Education: Polytechnic University of the Philippines
- Occupation: Actress
- Years active: 2010–present

Hazel Tapales Orencio (born September 21, 1986) is a Filipina character actress best known for her award-winning performances in Philippine New Wave films by director Lav Diaz such as Mula sa Kung Ano ang Noon (From What is Before, 2014), Elehiya sa dumalaw mula sa himagsikan (Elegy to the Visitor from the Revolution, 2011), and Ang Panahon ng Halimaw (Season of the Devil, 2018).
