= Rajah Tupas =

Tupas
- Rajah of Sugbu
- Reign: c. 1565
- Predecessor: Rajah Humabon
- Successor: Monarchy abolished Miguel López de Legazpi (as Governor-General of the Philippines)
- Born: c. 1497; Sugbu
- Died: 1568 (aged 70–71); Sugbu, Captaincy General of the Philippines

Rajah Tupas (baptized as Felipe Tupas; c. 1497 — 1568) was the last Rajah of Sugbu, succeeding Rajah Humabon. He is known to have been baptized under duress on March 21, 1568, at age 70, (Note: He had also been baptized when Magellan arrived together with his wife, her parents, his brother, two sisters in-law and ten nieces.) placing his birthdate at about 1497. He ruled Cebu with his peers. Miguel López de Legazpi arrived with his three ships at Sugbu's shores on April 27, 1565 and attacked three days later. Tupas' forces retreated and, on June 4, 1565, Tupas and Legaspi signed the Treaty of Sugbu, effectively giving Spain suzerainty over Sugbu. He died later in 1568.

== Bibliography ==
- Scott, William Henry (1992), Looking for the Prehispanic Filipino: and other essays in Philippine history, New Day Publishers, ISBN 978-971-10-0524-5.
