= Rajah Humabon =

One of the chiefs of Cebu involved in the Magellan expedition

Humabon

Rajah of Cebu
- Reign: 16th century, c. 1521
- Successor: Rajah Tupas
- Born: Cebu
- Died: before 1565
- Spouse: Juana

Rajah Humabon, baptized as Carlos, was a Sugbuanon (Cebuano) ruler who was one of the recorded chiefs in the historic polity of Cebu who encountered Ferdinand Magellan in 1521. Humabon, his wife whose original name is unknown but was baptized as Juana, and his subjects were the first known Christian converts in the Philippines.

There is no official record of Humabon's existence before the Spanish contact. The existing information was written by Magellan's Italian voyage chronicler, Antonio Pigafetta on Humabon and the indigenous peoples that existed prior to Spanish colonization. Rajah Humabon is cited as the reason for why Magellan fought in the Battle of Mactan, as the latter wanted to earn the trust of Humabon by helping him subdue his opponent Lapulapu, one of the oldest of four chiefs (or datus) of Mactan. Despite being referred to as "king" in the journal of Antonio Pigafetta, he was not one in the manner of a monarch in centralized societies. It is plausible that the title was mistakenly applied, as according to succeeding chroniclers, there were no kingdoms in the pre-colonial Philippines.

== Name variation ==
According to the book "Visayas en la Época de la Conquista" ("Visayas at the Time of Conquest") published in 1889 by Isabelo de los Reyes, his name was also pronounced as Hamabao which contains the Cebuano word, mabaw, "shallow" and the prefix ha-, which is added to adjectives referring to degree, or in poetic usage, gives formal flavor to the style. This is possible as it is common in Philippine languages wherein the sounds of /d/, tapped /ɾ/, and /l/ are sometimes identical to one another, case in point danaw and lanaw ("lake") as in Maguindanao, Maranao, and Lanao. Using this trend, it is possible that the sound shifted through either the /l/ sound shifting to /w/ or through /r/ to /l/ and then eventually /w/.

== Spanish contact ==
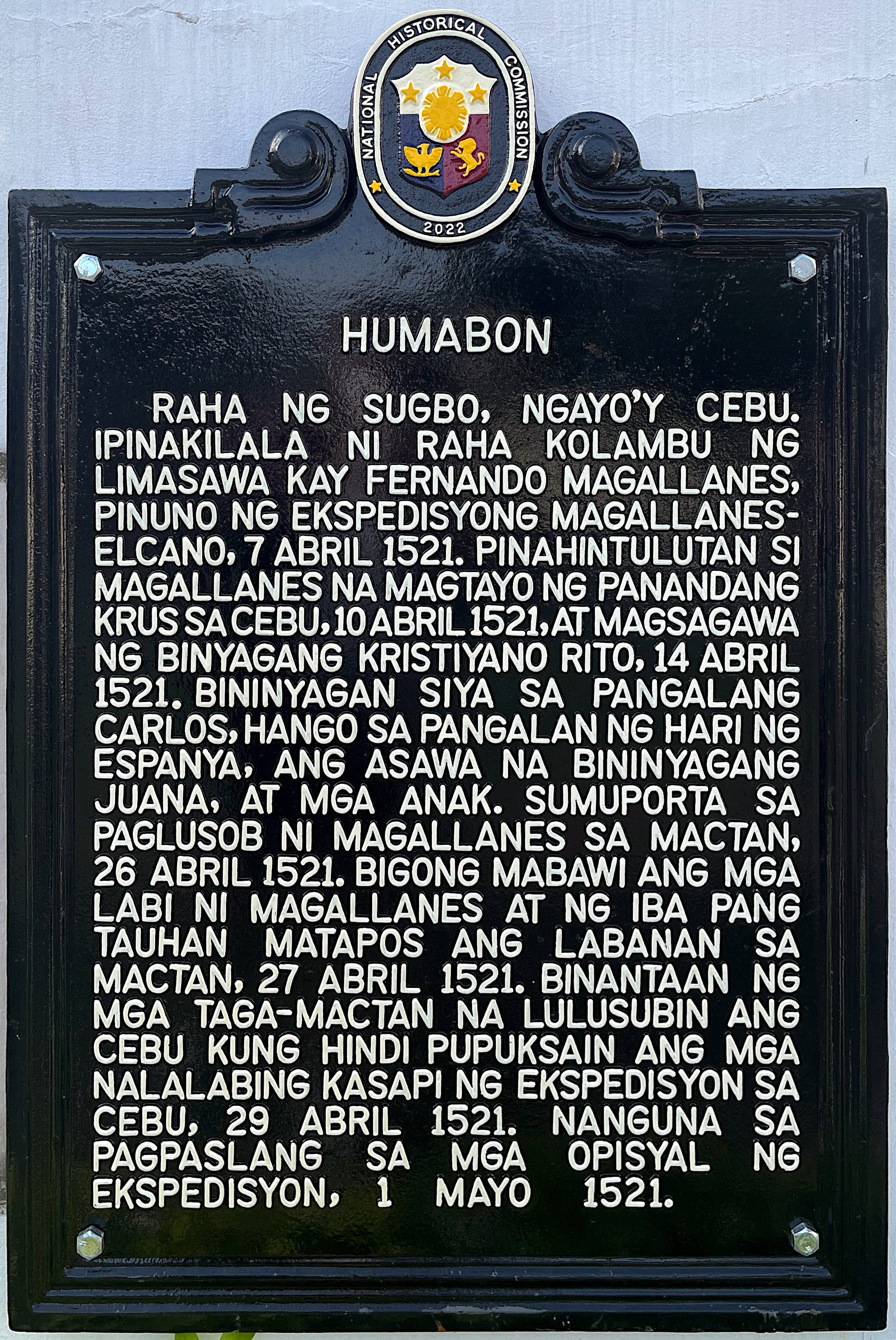
Historical marker installed by the National Historical Commission of the Philippines in 2022 at the Rajah Humabon monument in Cebu City

The phrase Cata Raya Chita was documented by historian Antonio Pigafetta to be a warning in the Malay language, from a merchant to the Rajah. Following Pigafetta's inscription, the phrase is creole Malay for "Kata-katanya adalah raya cita-cita". The phrase may mean "What they say is mainly ambitious": kata-kata ("words"), –nya (second person possessive), adalah ("is/are"), raya (great, main, large), cita-cita ("ambitious"). Another interpretation is that the phrase was spoken by merchants under the authority of Rajah Humabon was actually the Old Malay Kota raya kita, meaning "We are of the great fortress": Kota ("fortress"), Raya ("great"), Kita ("we"). The meeting between Rajah Humabon and Enrique of Malacca, the slave accompanying Magellan's voyage, was documented by Antonio Pigafetta and Spanish explorer Miguel López de Legazpi and is evidence that Old Malay was understood in parts of what is now the Philippines.

== Conversion to Catholicism, betrayal of Magellan's crew ==
According to historical accounts, Rajah Humabon was among the first indigenous converted to Catholicism after he, his wives, and his subjects were baptized by the expedition's priest, Pedro de Valderrama. On April 14, 1521, Humabon was christened Carlos in honor of King Charles I of Spain, while his chief consort was given the name Juana, after Charles' mother, Joanna of Castile. It is later presumed that his conversion to Catholicism was a ploy calculated to ensure that he had the support of the visiting Spaniards and to win their friendship.

He also made a blood compact with Magellan, as a sign of friendship; according to Pigafetta, it was Humabon who had requested Magellan to kill his rival, Lapulapu, the datu or chieftain of nearby Mactan Island.

After the death of Magellan at the Battle of Mactan and the consequent failure of the Spanish to defeat Lapulapu, Humabon's relationship with the Spanish deteriorated, and he eventually renounced Christianity and turned against the Spanish. Humabon and his warriors plotted to poison the remaining Spanish soldiers in Cebu during a feast. Several men were killed, including the then-leaders of the expedition, Duarte Barbosa and João Serrão.

According to the chronicler Pigafetta, Serrão, begging to be saved from the Cebuanos, allegedly referred to Enrique (Magellan's slave) as having instigated the massacre by claiming to Humabon that the Europeans planned to take over the kingdom.

Humabon's motivations for renouncing Christianity and turning against the Spaniards are not entirely clear, but it is believed that he was influenced by various factors, including dissatisfaction with Spanish rule, conflicts with other native groups, and his desire to maintain his autonomy and authority over his people.

== Aginid ==
The local academia is skeptical of supposed pre-colonial folk narratives about Humabon and Cebu as there is no official record of the origins of Rajah Humabon prior to the arrival of Magellan, and the provenance of such narratives is disputed, cannot be authenticated as genuine oral tradition, and dismissed as hoaxes at worst, well-meaning but misguided imaginative historical fiction at best.

According to Jovito Abellana's purported chronicle Aginid Bayok Sa Atong Tawarik, Humabon (also known as Sri Hamabar) was the son of Sri Bantug, and the grandson of Sri Lumay. His wife, unnamed in European sources until she was baptized Juana, is named as Humamai or Humamay with the title of Hara, purportedly the feminine of Hari, but this is considered as fabrication by linguists. His supposed ancestor, Sri Lumay, supposedly a half-Malay and half-Indian Tamil from Sumatra established Cebu as an Indianized monarchy, and sired at least four known sons, namely Alho, Ukob, Parang the Limp, and Bantug (father of Rajah Humabon). Sri Alho ruled a land known as Sialo which included the present-day towns of Carcar and Santander in the southern region of Cebu. Sri Ukob ruled a kingdom known as Nahalin in the north which included the present-day towns of Consolación, Liloan, Compostela, Danao, Carmen and Bantayan. He died in battle, fighting with the tribal group known as magalos from Mindanao. A third brother was Sri Parang the Limp, but could not rule because of his physical infirmity. Sri Bantug, the youngest, ruled a kingdom known as Singhapala (a variation of the Sanskrit Singha-Pura, "City of the Lion", which is also the root of Singapore), in a region which is now part of Cebu City, who later died of disease and was succeeded by his son Sri Hamabar, also known as Rajah Humabon. Because of his infirmity, Sri Parang handed Bantug's throne to Bantug's son Humabon as regent, and Humabon became the rajah (king) of Cebu. When Sri Bantug died, Sri Parang became his successor, but due to his limp he passed the throne to Humabon.

== Historical commemoration ==
The Rajah Humabon monument is located at Burgos Street in Cebu City.

== See also ==
- History of the Philippines
- Cebu (historical polity)

Regnal titles
Preceded by	Rajah of Sugbu c. late 1490s or 1500s–after 1521	Succeeded by Rajah Tupas
