= Siege of Biak-na-Bato =

- Part of Philippine Revolution
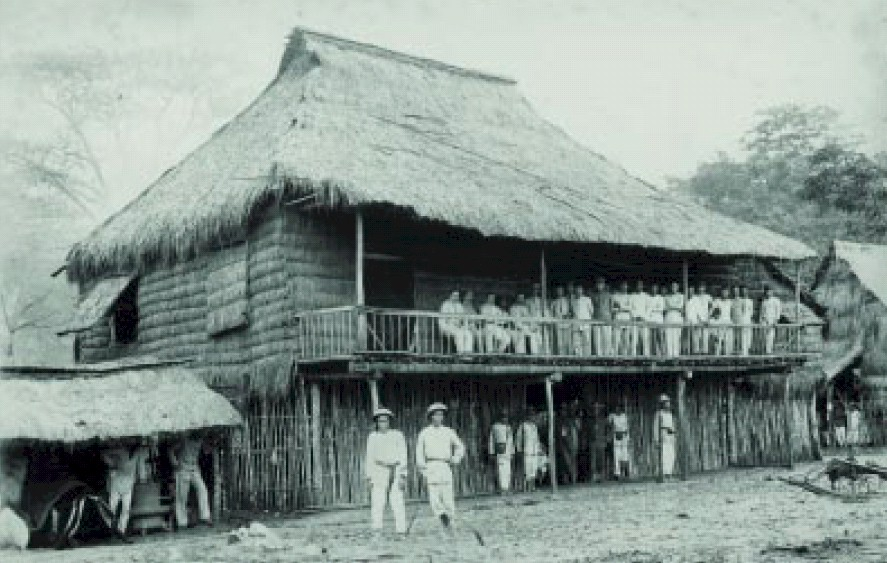
- The headquarters of Filipino forces at Biak-na-Bato
Date	December 1–17, 1897
Location	Biak-na-Bato Caves, San Miguel, Bulacan, Philippines 15.118879°N 121.085081°E
Result	Inconclusive: Signing of Pact of Biak-na-Bato
Territorial changes	Biak-na-Bato Republic is dissolved, but Filipino revolutionary cells in some areas in Luzon including at Biak-na-Bato itself remain.

Belligerents
Philippines	Spanish Empire

Commanders and leaders
Emilio Aguinaldo; Mariano Trias; Baldomero Aguinaldo; Gregorio del Pilar	Fernando Primo de Rivera; Ricardo Monet; Celestino Tejeiro; Bernardino Nozaleda; Miguel Primo de Rivera

Strength
1,000 men	8,000 army regulars, 25,000 native auxiliaries

Casualties and losses
Unknown	Unknown

The Siege of Biak-na-Bato was commenced by Spanish-led colonial forces against Filipino revolutionary forces stationed in and near the caves of Biak-na-Bato Mountain Range which is part of the town of San Miguel in the province of Bulacan, Philippines in December 1897. Biak-na-Bato served as the capital of the provisional Republic of Biak-na-Bato, officially called Republic of the Philippines, led by Emilio Aguinaldo and his staff. Deemed near-impregnable, the Spanish-led troops and auxiliaries failed to make headway into the mountain range and cave defended by Filipino forces, resulting to a stalemate until both sides settled for a ceasefire which led to the signing of Pact of Biak-na-Bato which implemented an armistice between two sides during the Philippine Revolution that lasted until May 1898.

== Background ==
The main Philippine revolutionary headquarters in Cavite was crushed by Spanish armies on early 1897, almost endangering the revolution. In a daring maneuver, Aguinaldo and his staff along with 500 handpicked men slipped through the Spanish blockade and relocated north to Biak-na-Bato in Bulacan, defeating a pursuing Spanish column along the way. Once word of Aguinaldo's arrival there reached the towns of central Luzon, men from the Ilocos provinces, Nueva Ecija, Pangasinan, Tarlac, and Zambales redoubled their efforts in their armed resistance against the Spanish. Biak-na-Bato then became the new headquarters of the Philippine revolutionary movement.

The Spanish colonial authorities presided over by Governor-General Fernando Primo de Rivera attempted to end the rebellion through several harsh security-related measures such as banning travel between the towns and cities, to no avail. Filipino revolutionary forces refused to lay down their arms and continued the fight. With no sufficient reinforcements to be expected from either Spain or Cuba as much of their forces are also engaged with the Cuban revolutionaries at the same time, Primo de Rivera resorted to recruiting and conscripting natives all over the Philippines from La Pampanga, Panay, and all the way south to Zamboanga and Cagayan de Misamis in Mindanao.

== Prelude ==
Between June to November 1897, successive offensives by Spanish forces across central Luzon resulted in mixed results. While the Spanish attack on Aliaga, Nueva Ecija failed, Mount Arayat, a key Filipino stronghold west of Biak-na-Bato, fell with the help of native Pampangueño auxiliaries after seven successive assaults. Meanwhile, a Republic of the Philippines was declared at Biak-na-Bato.

== Siege ==
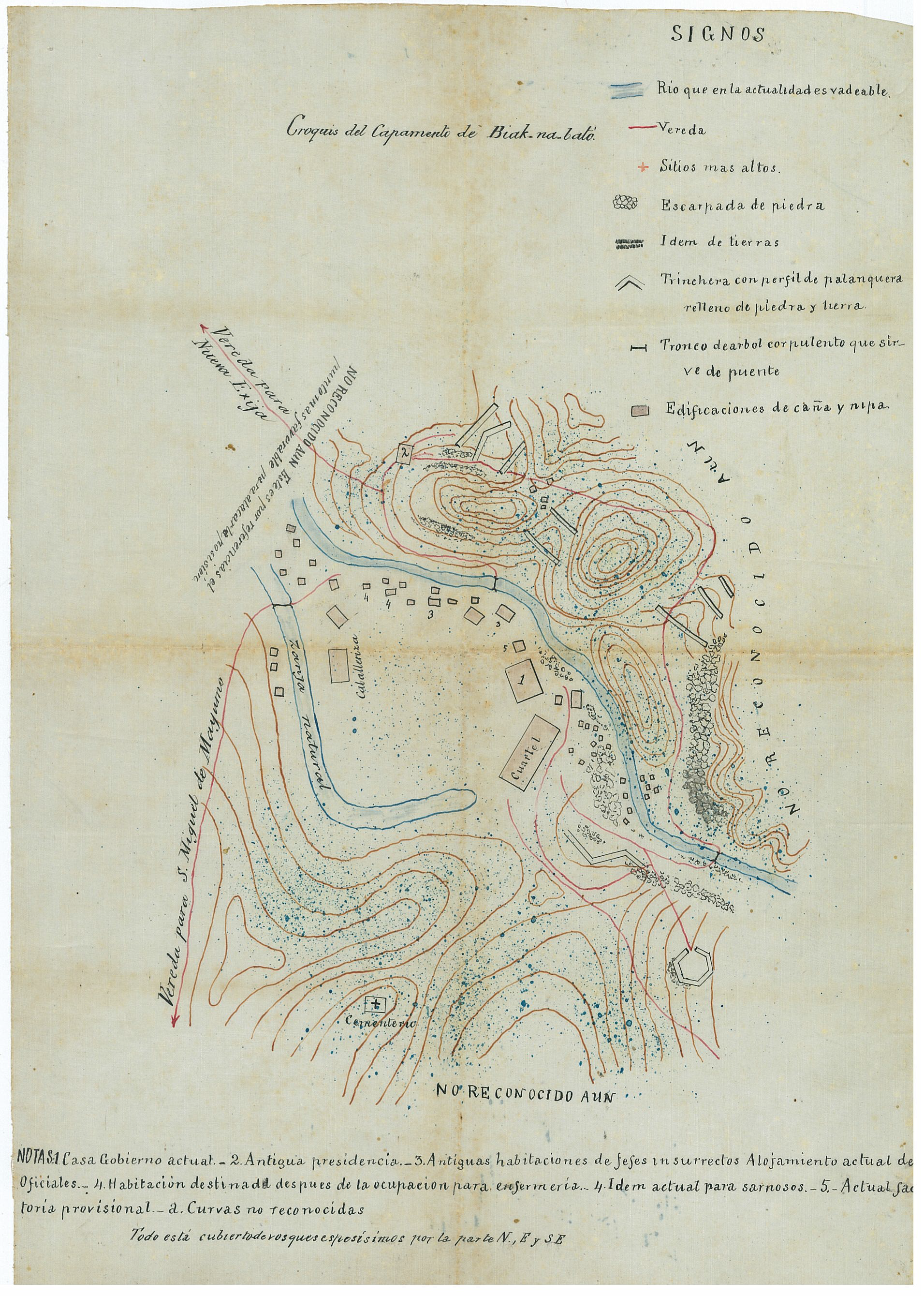
A hand-drawn Spanish military map of the Filipino revolutionary headquarters at Biak-na-bato during the siege.

In the first days of December 1897, under duress from the Cortes Generales in Madrid, Primo de Rivera ordered the Filipino revolutionary headquarters at the mountain range and caves of Biak-na-Bato to be taken. The regular Spanish Army numbered 8,000 men but he still deemed it insufficient for the operation given that much of central Luzon is still in open rebellion, so he requested assistance from Archbishop Bernardino Nozaleda y Villa in Manila. The latter obliged, mobilizing 20–25,000 native auxiliaries and laborers to aid with the logistics and siege works surrounding Biak-na-Bato; these were Catholic adherents all over the Philippines loyal to the Spanish Crown who volunteered to answer the archbishop's call of assistance.

Biak-na-Bato, being a mountain range only accessible through a narrow pass that only the locals knew of, was defended by roughly 1,000 armed revolutionaries with Aguinaldo himself and his staff ensconced within the area. Seeing the near-impregnability of the Filipino stronghold, Primo de Rivera confided back to the Cortes through a telegram that though he might be able to take the caves the rebellion will still continue. Primo de Rivera also ruled out a direct assault against the mountain range out of fear of suffering massive casualties. A stalemate thus ensued for two weeks wherein the Spanish were not able to break through nor subdue the Filipino revolutionaries while the outnumbered and less equipped Filipinos could not break the siege.

== Truce ==
The siege remained inconclusive due to the stalemate where no side was the clear winner. Both sides then finally agreed to a ceasefire on 14 December 1897. Pedro Paterno, a lawyer from Manila, served as the mediator. After intense discussion between both sides, the Pact of Biak-na-Bato was thus signed, temporarily ending the conflict. To make sure that the terms of the pact were to be followed by both sides, the Spanish generals Ricardo Monet and Celestino Tejeiro have to remain at the Filipino headquarters in Biak-na-Bato as hostages while Aguinaldo and his staff are escorted by Paterno and his father Maximo through the port town of Sual before they could start their exile in Hong Kong.

The pact, however, was never truly respected by both sides. While many Filipinos laid down their arms under the terms of the pact as amnesty, many still refused to lay them down. Likewise, the Spanish reneged on their promises of land and money to those who laid down their arms. Earlier the next year, in Pangasinan, a proxy revolutionary government was established by general Francisco Macabulos, thereby continuing the revolution there against the terms of the pact. Worse, the revolution is now also spreading as far as Visayas, where an attempt by Cebuano co-revolutionaries was made to take Cebu by force in April 1898. The next month, Aguinaldo and his staff finally ended their exile from Hong Kong as they returned to Kawit, Cavite as the dictator of the Philippine revolutionary government spearheaded by a newly formed regular Philippine army which proved itself at Imus and unfurled the Philippine tricolor for the first time in history.

== See also ==
- Pact of Biak-na-Bato

== Citations ==
- Zaide, Sonia M. (1994), The Philippines: A Unique Nation, All-Nations Publishing Co., ISBN 971-642-071-4
