= Battle of Aliaga =

1897 battle in Nueva Ecija, Philippines

- Part of the Philippine Revolution
Date	September 4–5, 1897
Location	Aliaga, Nueva Ecija
Result	Filipino victory

Belligerents
Revolutionary Government	Spain: Captaincy General of the Philippines

Commanders and leaders
Emilio Aguinaldo; Manuel Tinio; Mamerto Natividad; Casimiro Tinio; Pio del Pilar; Jose Ignacio Paua; Eduardo Llanera	Fernando Primo de Rivera; Ricardo Monet; General Nuñez

Strength
5,000 men	8,000 men

Casualties and losses
8 dead, 10 wounded	1 dead, 44 wounded

The Battle of Aliaga was fought on September 4–5, 1897, between the Philippine revolutionaries of Nueva Ecija and the Spanish forces of Governor General Primo de Rivera.

== Background ==
With his forces evacuating out of Cavite, Aguinaldo and his forces retreated to Puray, Montalban, winning a battle there and eventually found his way to central Luzon. He and his forces then relocated the revolutionary capital at Biak-na-Bato, San Miguel, Bulacan, on June 24, 1897. From there, he exercised his authority as the revolutionary president of the Republica Filipina and sent letters to all islands in the Philippine islands encouraging the natives to rise up against Spain.

== The battle ==
On September 4, with the principal objective of acquiring provisions lacking in Biac-na-Bato, President Emilio Aguinaldo directed orders to Gen. Natividad and Col. Manuel Tinio to unite their forces with those of Col. Casimiro Tinio, Gen. Pio del Pilar, Col. Jose Paua and Eduardo Llanera for a combined dawn attack on Aliaga. (Casimiro Tinio, popularly known as ‘Capitan Berong', was an elder brother of Manuel through his father's first marriage.) The following morning was described as "The most glorious battle of the rebellion". The rebel forces, numbering about between 4,000 and 5,000 men, took the church and convent, the Casa Tribunal and other government buildings. The commander of the Spanish detachment died in the first moments of fighting, while those who survived were locked up in the thick-walled jail. The rebels then proceeded to entrench themselves and fortify several houses. The following day, Sunday the 5th, the church and convent as well as a group of houses were put to the torch due to exigencies of defense.

=== Spanish counterattack ===
Alarmed by these sudden attacks, Governor General Primo de Rivera fielded 8,000 men under the command of Gen. Ricardo Monet and Gen. Nuñez. The latter commanded a column of reinforcements that arrived in the afternoon of the 6th, they were met with such a tremendous hail of bullets that the general, two captains and many soldiers were wounded, forcing the Spaniards to retreat a kilometer away from the town to await the arrival of Gen. Monet and his men. Even with the reinforcements, the Spaniards were overcautious in attacking the rebels there, and halted their attack for the rest of the day. The Filipinos held the town of Aliaga for the rest of the day up into the night of September 5 before withdrawing back to Biak-na-Bato under the cover of darkness, having achieved victory.

== Aftermath ==
The Filipinos transitioned to guerrilla warfare after winning the battle at Aliaga. In October the following month they went to the offensive again and attacked San Rafael, Bulacan to procure supplies for their headquarters at Biak-na-Bato, with the battle lasting several days before they won and gained control of the town. They then withdrew bringing the supplies with them and leaving a small detachment to stave off any potential Spanish effort to retake the town and make headway to Biak-na-Bato.

The Spanish were only able to besiege Biak-na-Bato nearly three months later in December 1897, going inconclusively until an armistice was signed between both sides.

== See also ==
- Battle of Binakayan
- Retreat to Montalban
- Cry of Nueva Ecija
