= Biak-na-Bato =

Biak-na-Bato is a barangay in San Miguel, Bulacan, Philippines.

Biak-na-Bato may also refer to:

- Biak-na-Bato National Park, a protected area in Bulacan, Philippines
- Republic of Biak-na-Bato, the first Philippine republic established in Bulacan, Philippines
- Pact of Biak-na-Bato, truce between Spanish and Filipino revolutionary forces
