= José Ignacio Paua =

Chinese-Filipino military officer (1872–1926)

- 劉亨賻 (Lâu Hing-pua̍h)
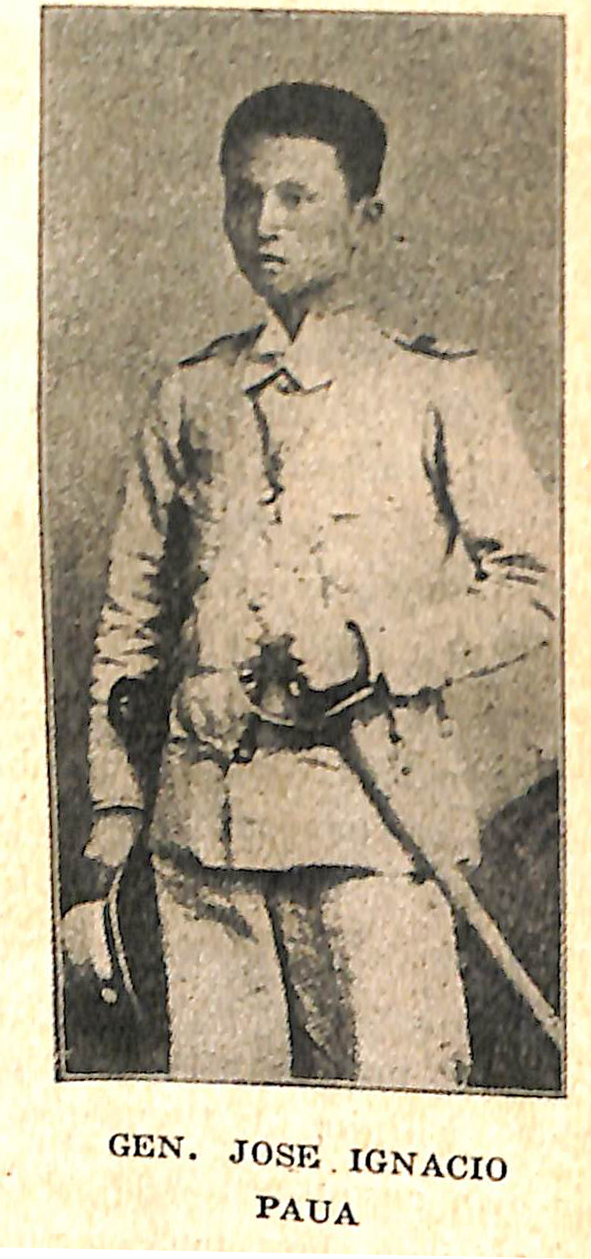
- Born: April 29, 1872; Nan'an, Quanzhou, Fujian, Qing Dynasty
- Died: May 24, 1926 (aged 54); Manila, Philippine Islands
- Burial place: Manila North Cemetery
- Military career
- Allegiance: First Philippine Republic; Republic of Biak-na-Bato; Katipunan (Magdalo)
- Branch: Philippine Revolutionary Army
- Rank: Brigadier General
- Nickname: "Intsik"
- Conflicts: Philippine Revolution: Battle of Binakayan-Dalahican; Battle of Imus; Battle of Zapote Bridge; Battle of Perez Dasmariñas; Battle of Tres de Abril; Battle of Aliaga; Philippine–American War: Battle of Guinobatan

José Ignacio Paua (Chinese: 劉亨賻; Tâi-lô: Lâu Hing-pua̍h; 29 April 1872 – 24 May 1926) was a Chinese-Filipino general who joined the Katipunan, a secret society that spearheaded the 1896 Philippine Revolution against the Spanish Empire. He later served in the Philippine Republican Army under General Emilio Aguinaldo, the first Philippine president.

== Biography ==
José Ignacio Paua was born to Chinese parents in Nan'an, Quanzhou, Southern Fujian, Qing China on April 29, 1872. And in 1890, he went to the Philippines with his uncle to seek his fortune and became a blacksmith's apprentice in Binondo, Manila.

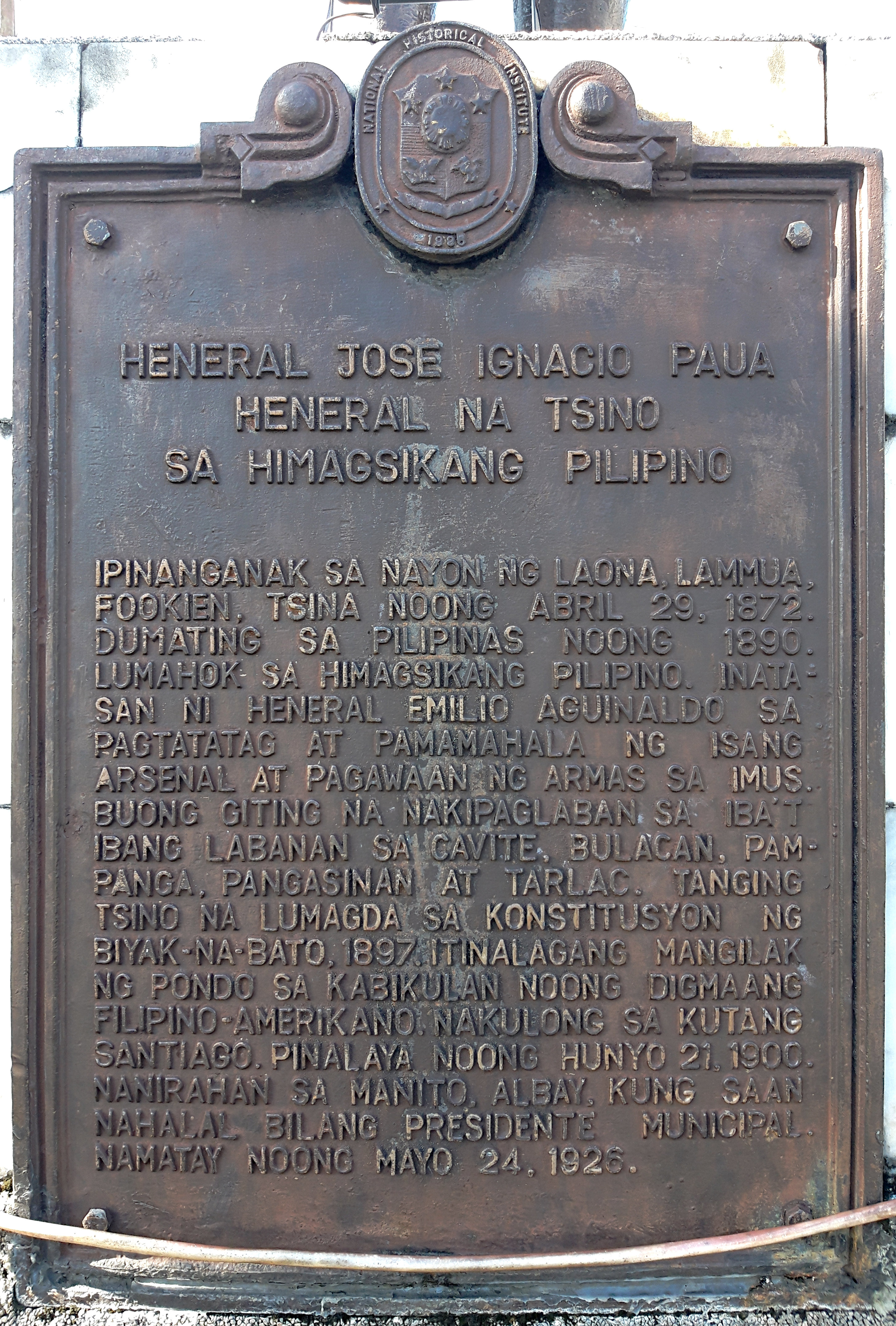
Historical marker installed in 1996 in Legazpi, Albay

During the Philippine Revolution, he repaired lantaka cannons and other weapons. Near to the closing days of the revolution, he later served in the Philippine Revolutionary Army under Philippine President Emilio Aguinaldo.

On April 25, 1897, he also led the capture of Andres Bonifacio and Procopio Bonifacio under orders of President Aguinaldo along with Agapito Bonzón. Paua has been said to be the one who stabbed Andres Bonifacio in the neck during his arrest.

When the revolution ended, Paua began to fight against the Americans during the Philippine–American War and on September 26, 1898, he became a full general. When the war ended, he married a Filipino girl and they settled in Albay. He died of cancer on May 24, 1926, in Manila at the age of 54.

== In popular culture ==
Paua was portrayed by Danilo Montes in the 1956 film Heneral Paua, directed by Felix Villar.
