= Battle of San Mateo (1899) =

Part of the Philippine–American War (December 19, 1899)

- Part of the Philippine–American War
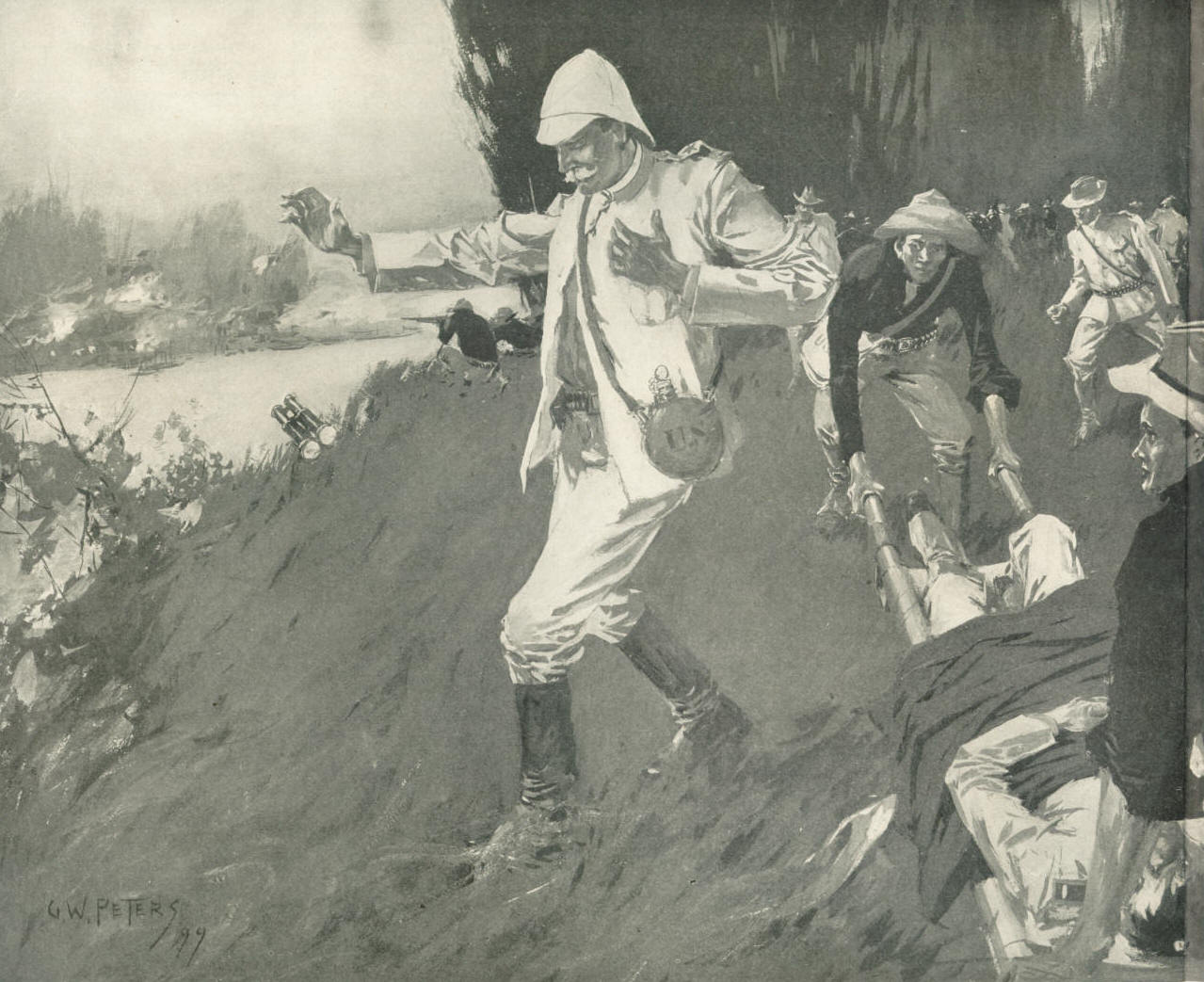
- Death of Major-General Henry Ware Lawton during the battle
Date	December 19, 1899
Location	San Mateo, Manila (now Rizal), Philippines
Result	Inconclusive
Territorial changes	Filipino forces retreat from San Mateo

Belligerents
Philippine Republic	United States

Commanders and leaders
Pio del Pilar; Licerio Gerónimo	Henry Ware Lawton †; James R. Lockett

Strength
1,000	Unknown

Casualties and losses
40 killed 125 wounded	14 killed 15 wounded

The Battle of San Mateo was a battle during the Philippine–American War between the United States and the Philippines. It was fought on December 19, 1899, near San Mateo in what was then Manila province (now a part of Rizal) between the forces of General Henry Ware Lawton, and General Licerio Gerónimo's Morong Command and a detachment of Tiradores de la Muerte. Lawton was killed in the battle, making him the highest-ranking American commander to die in the Philippine conflict.

On December 18, Lawton and his men were en route to San Mateo along the Marikina River in a punitive expedition against Brig. Gen. Pio del Pilar's 1,000 force, which threatened the Marikina waterworks and the Manila Wagon Road to the north. Lawton's force included Col. James R. Lockett's squadron of the 11th Volunteer Cavalry and Lt. Col. H.H. Sargent's 29th Battalion. A monsoon flooded the river and muddied the trail.

== Battle ==
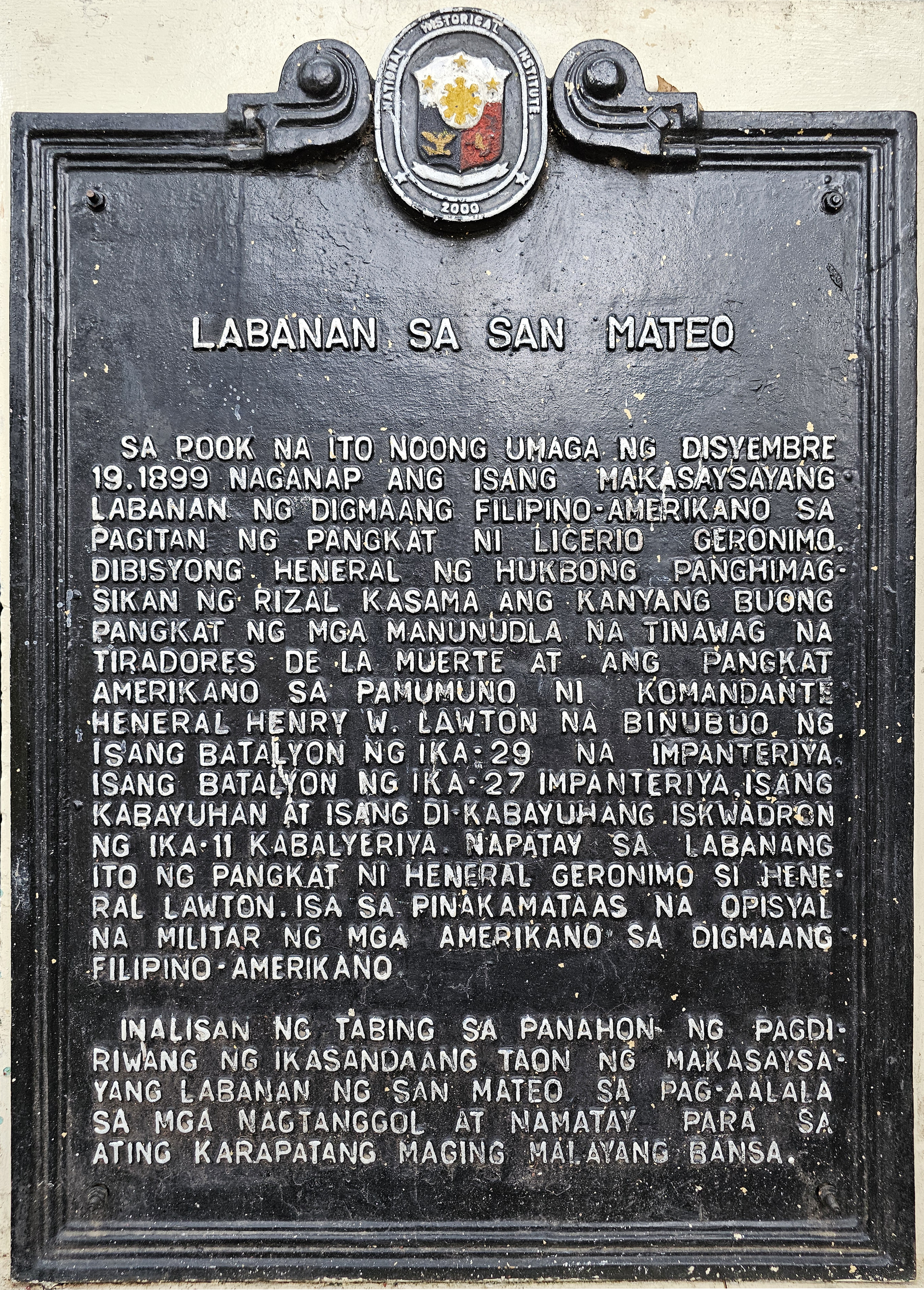
Historical marker installed in 2000 in Bagong Silangan, Quezon City

On December 19, the 11th captured Montalban, while Sargent's squadron made for San Mateo, approaching the Filipinos in rain and mist. The Filipinos forced Lawton's troops to scramble for cover in the rice fields.

Lawton walked up and down the line in a white rain coat and pith helmet, rallying his men even after his aide was struck. Lawton died from a bullet to the chest from a Filipino sniper by the name of Bonifacio Mariano.

Despite Lawton's death and heavy enemy fire, American troops faced additional challenges from the monsoon conditions, which made the nearby river nearly impassable. Two of Sargent's men located a ford and swam across the swollen river under fire and found a canoe, enabling them to ferry their comrades across.

As Filipino rifle fire subsided, the Americans used the canoe to move north. Nearly six hours after encountering resistance, the entire American contingent crossed the river. The Filipino forces, weary and having inflicted minimal casualties, eventually retreated. The galvanized American forces then drove them from San Mateo.

== Aftermath ==
The death of General Lawton proved to be a terrible blow to his soldiers' morale and the U.S. public. Lawton's body was taken to Manila's Paco Park.

Before his death, Lawton had written about the Filipinos in a formal correspondence, "Taking into account the disadvantages they have to fight against in terms of arms, equipment and military discipline, without artillery, short of ammunition, powder inferior, shells reloaded until they are defective, they are the bravest men I have ever seen ..."
