= Licerio Gerónimo =

Filipino general during the Philippine-American War

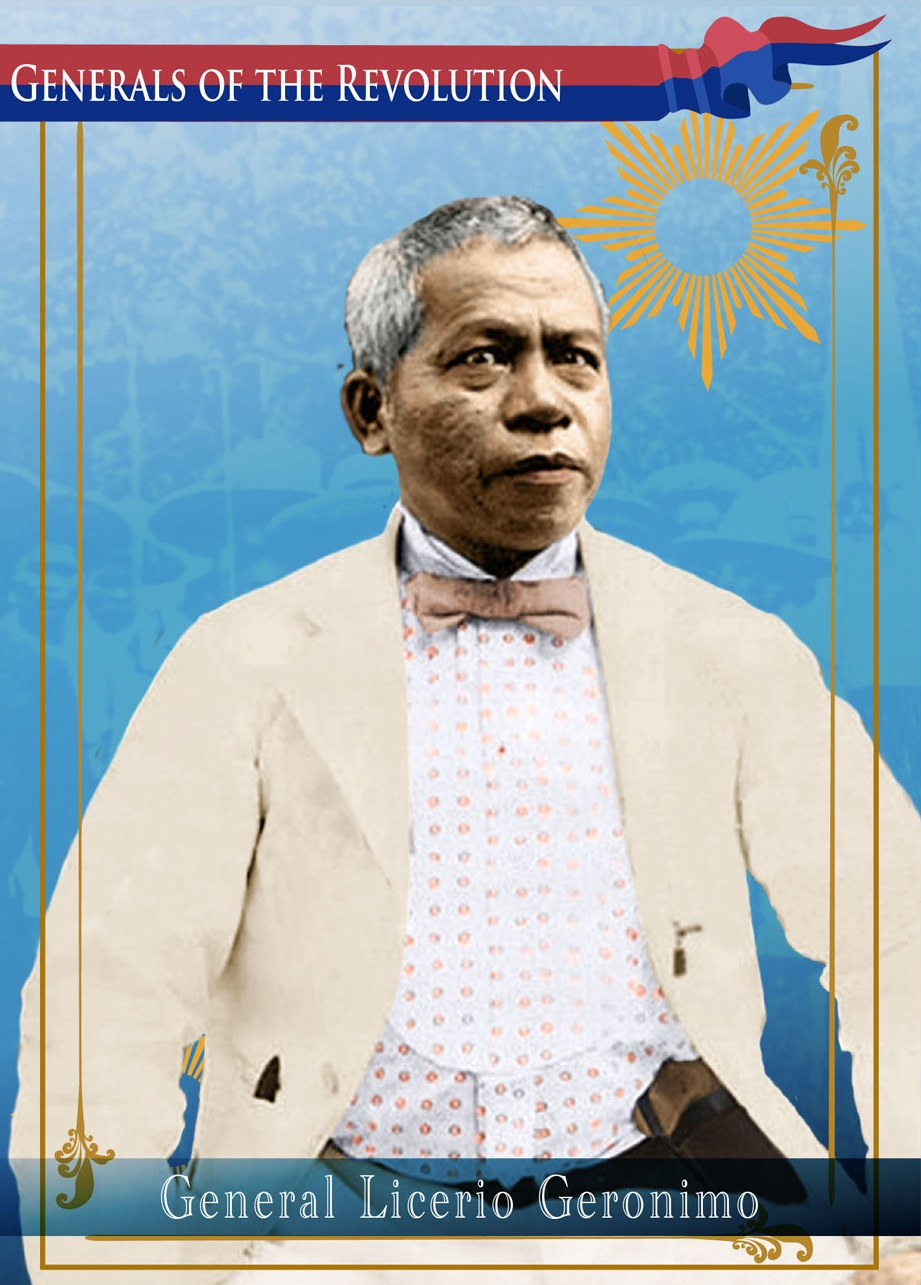
- Born: Licerio Gerónimo e Imaya; August 27, 1855; Sampaloc, Manila, Captaincy General of the Philippines
- Died: January 16, 1924 (aged 68) Montalban, Rizal, Philippine Islands
- Buried: Rodriguez, Rizal, Philippines
- Allegiance: First Philippine Republic; Republic of Biak-na-Bato; Katipunan
- Conflicts: Philippine Revolution: Battle of San Juan del Monte; Battle of Mount Puray; Philippine–American War: Battle of San Mateo (1899)
- Spouses: Francisca Reyes; Cayetana Linco

Licerio Gerónimo e Imaya (August 27, 1855 – January 16, 1924) was a general of the Philippine Revolutionary Forces under Emilio Aguinaldo. He is remembered in Philippine–American War annals as the opposing general to Major General Henry Ware Lawton at the Battle of San Mateo on December 19, 1899, where Lawton lost his life along with 13 other Americans. Lawton had been previously credited with the capture of the Apache leader Geronimo. Licerio Geronimo possibly possessed Native American descent himself as the Spanish used to send Indios (Native Americans), Mestizos, and Criollos, from the Spanish-Americas to the Philippines during colonial times.

== Early years ==
Gerónimo was born in Sampaloc, Manila on August 27, 1855, to Graciano Geronimo, a native of Montalban, District of Morong, and Flaviana Imaya, a native of Gapan, Nueva Ecija. He was the eldest of six siblings.

When he was nine, he lived with his grandfather in a farm in San Miguel de Mayumo, Bulacan. At 14, he joined his father in Montalban where he helped in farm chores. Due to poverty, Geronimo did not enjoy the benefits of formal education but he learned how to read and write with the help of a friend who taught him the alphabet.

He married twice; his first marriage to Francisca Reyes ended with her death. His second wife was Cayetana Lincaoco of San Mateo, who bore him five children. He earned a living by farming, and by working as a boatman on the Marikina and Pasig rivers, transporting passengers to and from Manila.

== Philippine Revolution ==
Geronimo was recruited into the secret revolutionary society Katipunan by his godfather, Felix Umali, alguacil mayor of barrio Wawa, Montalban.

A member of the Katipunan, Gerónimo was part of the rebel group that assaulted the San Juan del Monte gunpowder magazine on August 30, 1896, and organized forces under his command in Montalban, San Mateo, and Marikina.

In 1897, he took part in the Battle of Mount Puray, and was designated as Division General in charge of Morong after the death of Andres Bonifacio. After the defeat of the Spanish, he was then appointed by General Antonio Luna as the commanding general of the third military zone of Manila, and it was in this capacity that he served in the Battle of San Mateo. It was in this battle that General Henry Ware Lawton, the highest-ranking officer of the US expeditionary forces in the Philippines was killed in action. Private Bonifacio Mariano, a member of Tiradores de la Muerte, shot the lethal round that hit the general right through the lungs.

By 1900, he was appointed as the superior chief of the second and third zones of Manila, and he also held the commands of Morong and Marinduque. On March 29, 1901, Gen. Licerio Gerónimo, 6 officers, and 40 soldiers surrender at San Mateo, Manila to Col. J Milton Thompson and the 42nd Regiment of Infantry. Col Thompson informed Gen. Gerónimo of Emilio Aguinaldo's capture 6 days prior. He remained skeptical until Col. Thompson produced a newspaper headlining Aguinaldo's capture. Shortly afterwards, Gen. Licerio Gerónimo, along with his troops, took the Oath of Allegiance to the United States. On 21 May 1901, El Comercio reported and described the anticipated presentations of the revolutionary leaders Licerio Gerónimo, Lacuna, and Pablo Astilla as significant because of the number of officers and soldiers under their influence and the quality and quantity of their war materials.

== Later years ==
Gerónimo later worked for the United States and enlisted for the Philippine Constabulary on June 1, 1902, as an inspector, successfully bringing in bandits and former soldiers roaming the countryside. He was also part of the search party that brought down General Luciano San Miguel and his followers on March 27, 1903.

He left the constabulary on May 16, 1904, and returned to work at his farm in Barrio San Rafael, Montalban.

Gerónimo died on January 16, 1924, and his remains were interred at the Mausoleo de los Veteranos de la Revolución in Manila North Cemetery, Manila. His remains were then reinterred in the base of the Licerio Geronimo Memorial in Rodriguez, Rizal on February 20, 1993.

== Legacy ==
Barangay Geronimo and General Licerio Gerónimo Memorial National High School in Rodriguez, Rizal, and General Licerio Gerónimo Public Elementary School and a street in his hometown of Sampáloc, Manila were named in his honor.

Under Republic Act No. 11296 signed on April 17, 2019, The Hilltop Rizal PNP Command in Taytay, Rizal was renamed to Camp Licerio Geronimo.

== Gallery ==
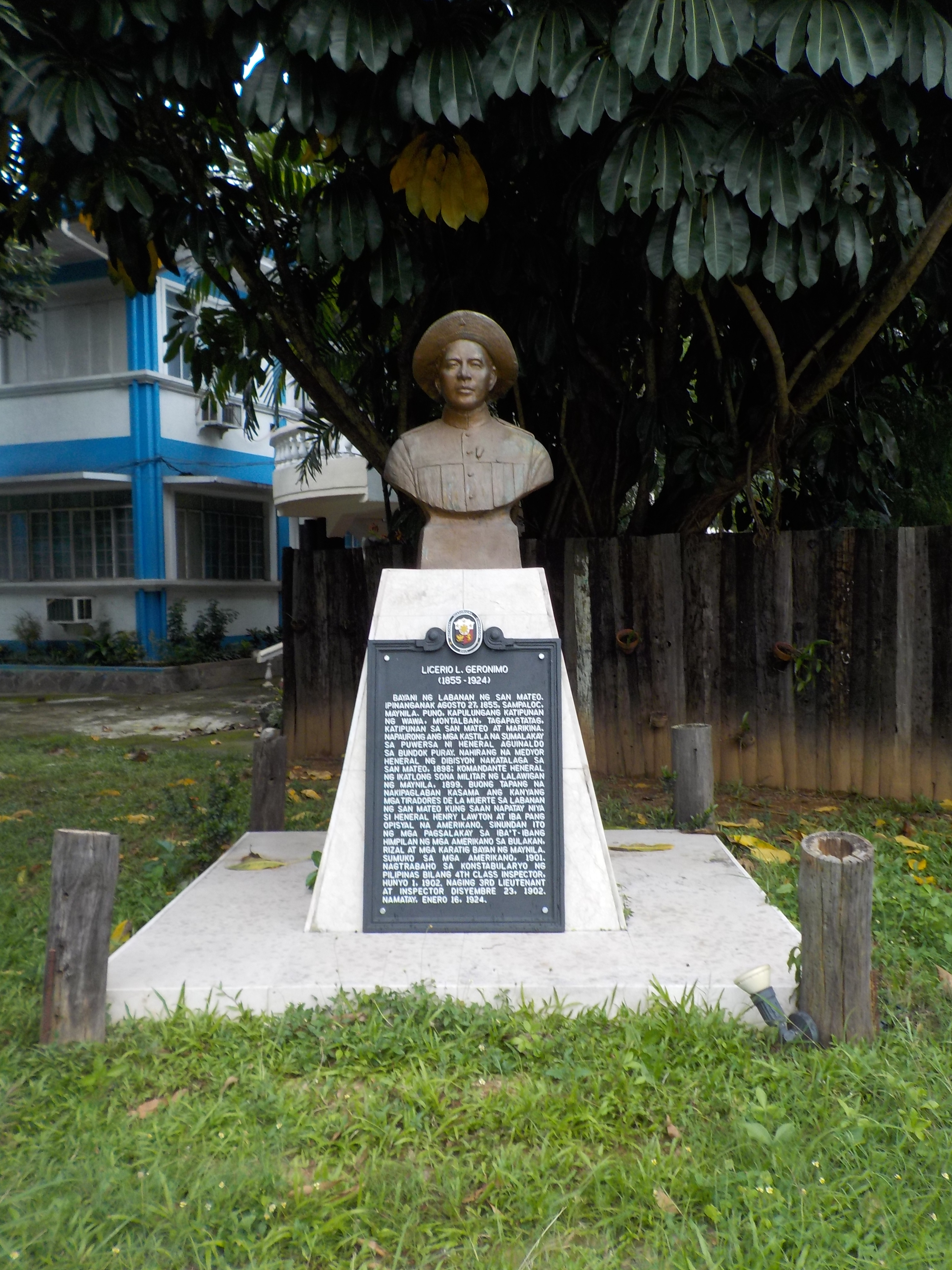
Monument at Camp Geronimo, Taytay, Rizal

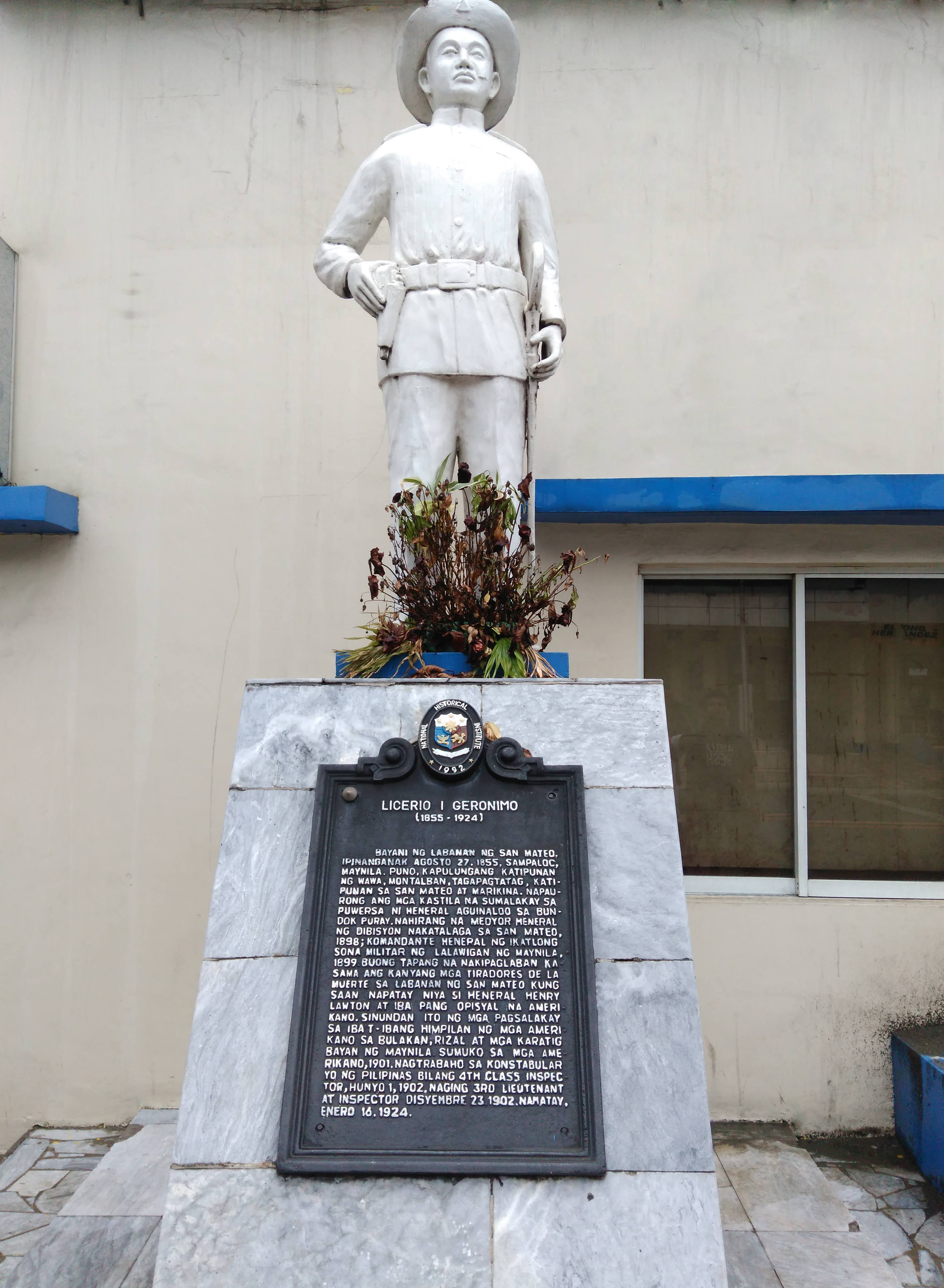
Licerio Geronimo Memorial, Rodriguez, Rizal

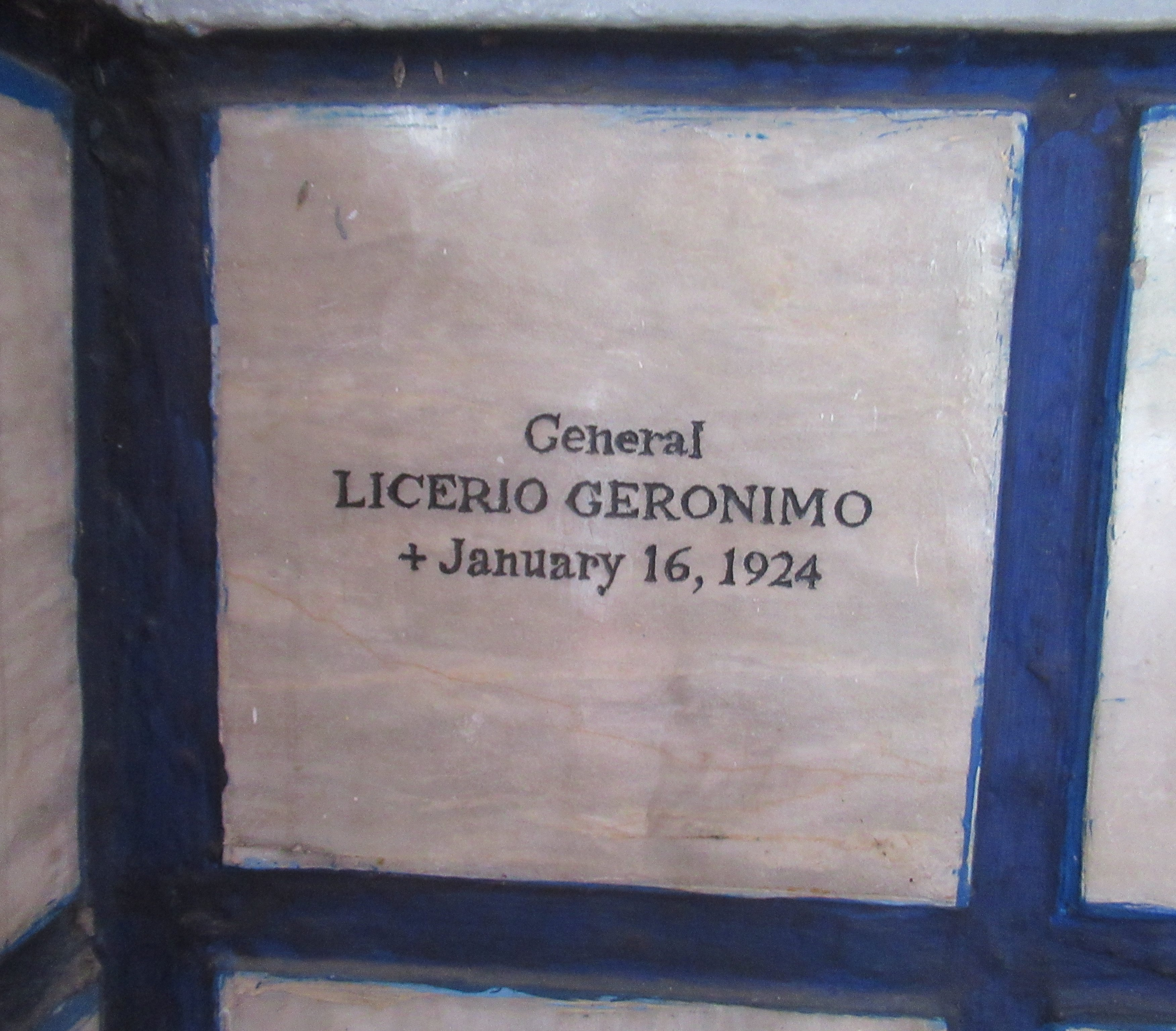
Gerónimo's grave at Mausoleum of the Veterans of the Revolution (Manila North Cemetery)

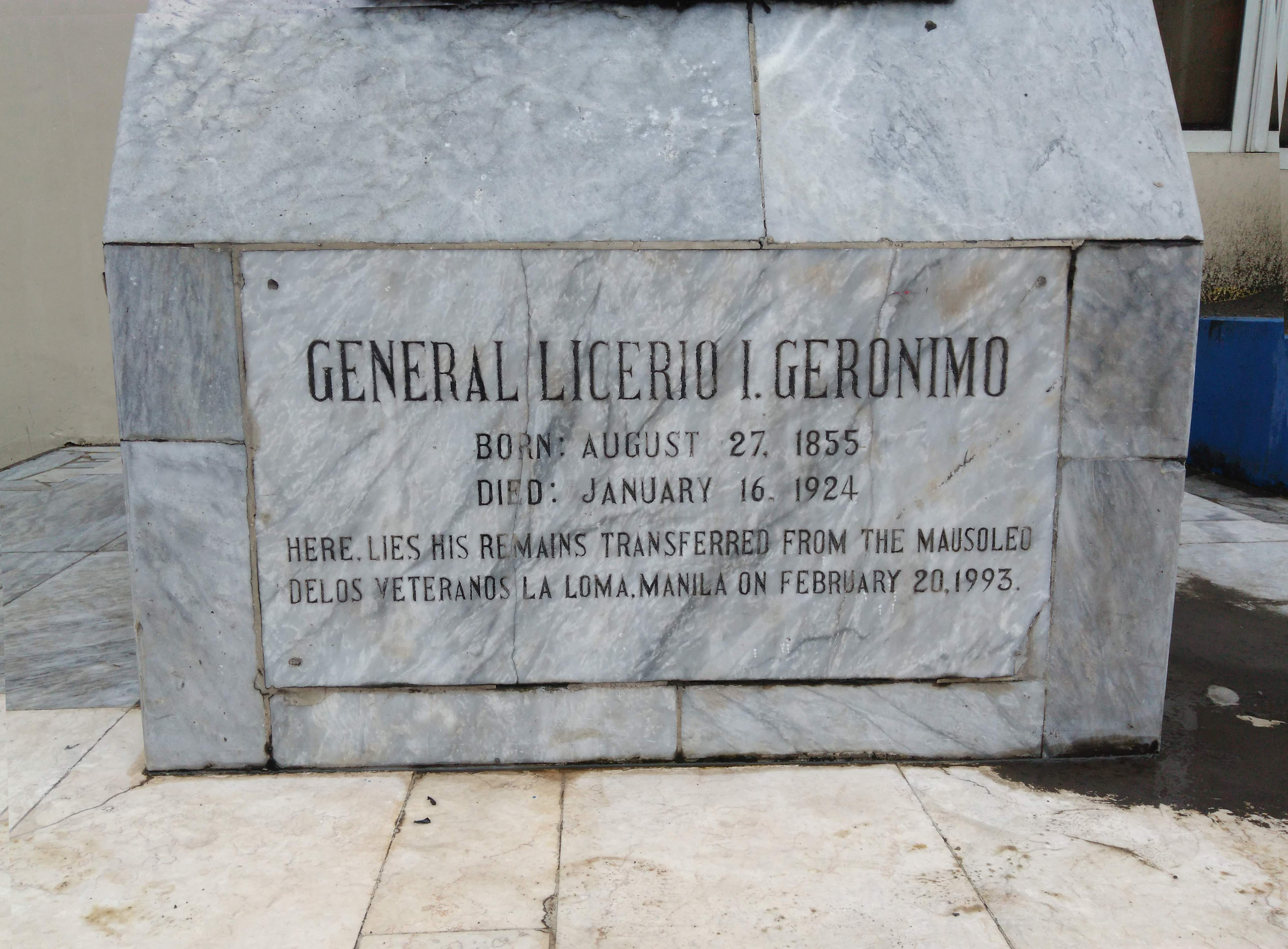
Inscription on the memorial marking the final resting place of his remains

== Footnotes ==
1. "General Geronimo, The Guerrilla Chieftain, Has Surrendered."- New American newspaper, Manila, March 30, 1901.
