= Retreat to Montalban =

- Part of the Philippine Revolution
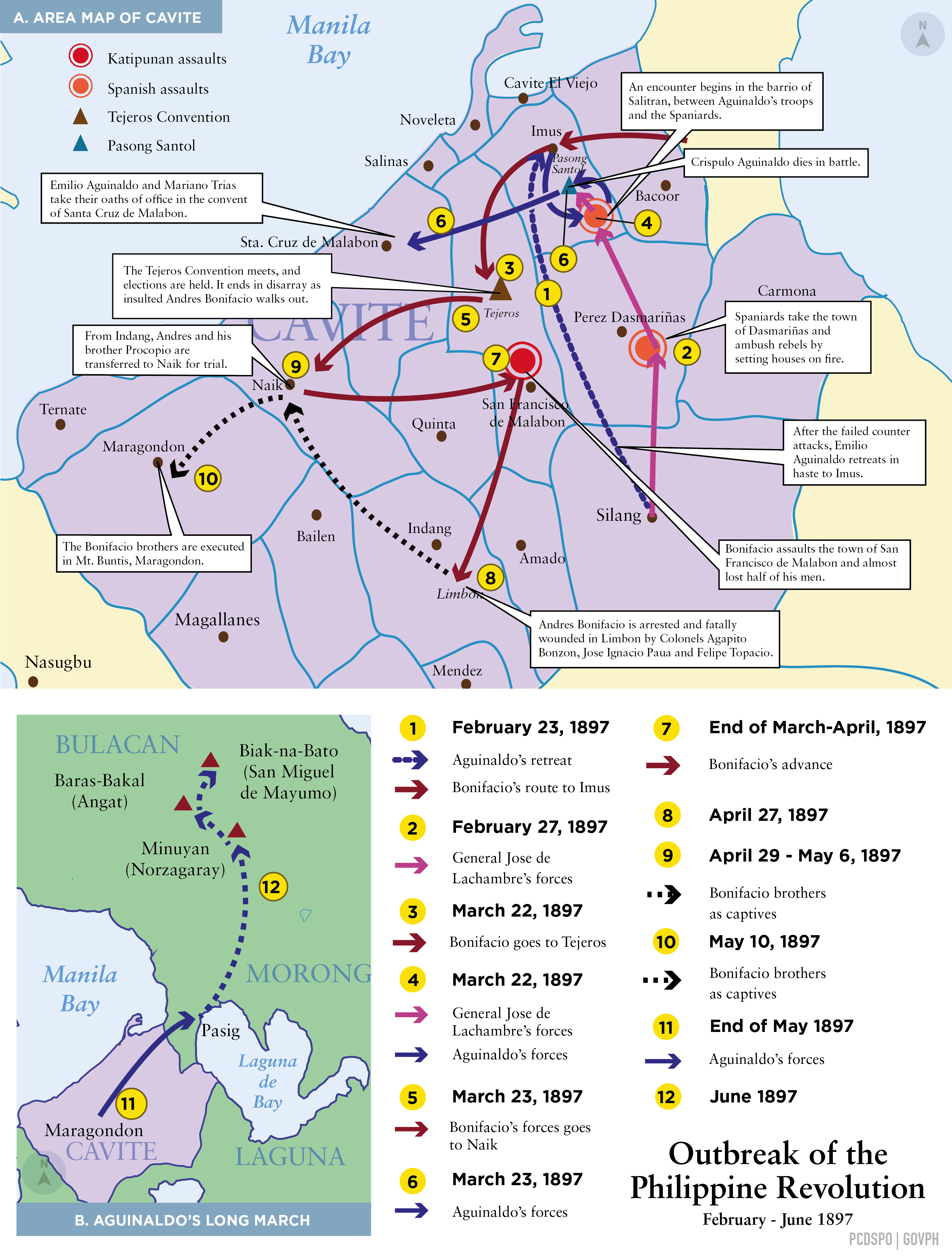
Date	May 3, 1897 – June 14, 1897
Location	Cavite, Laguna and Morong (now Rizal) Philippines
Result	Tactical Spanish victory Strategic Filipino victory: Spanish forces capture most of Cavite; Filipino forces that evacuated Cavite successfully reached Montalban; End of the retreat at the Battle of Mount Puray and eventual relocation of revolutionary headquarters to Biak-na-Bato in Bulacan

Belligerents
Filipino Revolutionaries	(Spain) Spanish Empire

Commanders and leaders
Emilio Aguinaldo; Manuel Tinio	Primo de Rivera; Ricardo Monet; Andrés Jaén Núñez

Strength
400 men	24,875 men

The Retreat to Montalban occurred during the Philippine Revolution after the 1897 Battle of Naic southwest of Cavite when Philippine General Emilio Aguinaldo's and his forces retreated to Puray, Montalban on June 14. The Spanish pursued the Katipunero forces retreating towards central Luzon, killing many of the revolutionaries. However, the retreat finally ended when Aguinaldo and the Filipinos won the Battle of Mount Puray, from which he would make his temporary headquarters, relocating it again to Norzagaray and Angat, until finally reaching the caves of Biak-na-Bato on June 24, 1897, and making it the new revolutionary headquarters.

== Prelude ==
The revolutionary forces in Cavite were exhausted and failing against the freshly reinforced Spanish troops that went from Manila to Laguna. After numerous defeats in Imus and Silang, along with the execution of Andres Bonifacio, the Filipino revolutionaries have lost their morale and their willingness to fight, causing some to surrender to the Spanish.

== The retreat ==
According to the memoir Aguinaldo wrote called "The True Version of the Philippine Revolution", he stated that the Battle of Naic on May 3, 1897, was fought successfully by his troops on a river in Naic which held the Spanish forces at bay before the retreat on mid May. After the battle, they then proceeded to their headquarters on Talisay, Batangas before being approached by Spanish forces on May 30 which made the revolutionaries retreat. The retreat was made from Paliparan, a village belonging to Perez Dasmariñas, and then went through Malapad-na-Bato and Mariquina, and by June 10 they were spotted to be near Mount Puray. They encountered Spanish troops while they were camping on June 14 and were attacked. However, the revolutionaries were successful in this battle, and hence the long retreat finally ended. They then proceeded on a long march towards their hill bases in Bulacan, namely Norzagaray, Angat and then finally the cave at Biak-na-Bato in San Miguel in the province of Bulacan by June 24, where the place was deemed far away from the front lines. From then on they made Biak-na-Bato as the new headquarters of the revolution, setting up a republican government and handing out orders across the Philippine islands, extending the revolution from just the original eight provinces first to revolt against Spain to include all of the Philippines.
