= Battle of Mount Puray =

- Part of the Philippine Revolution
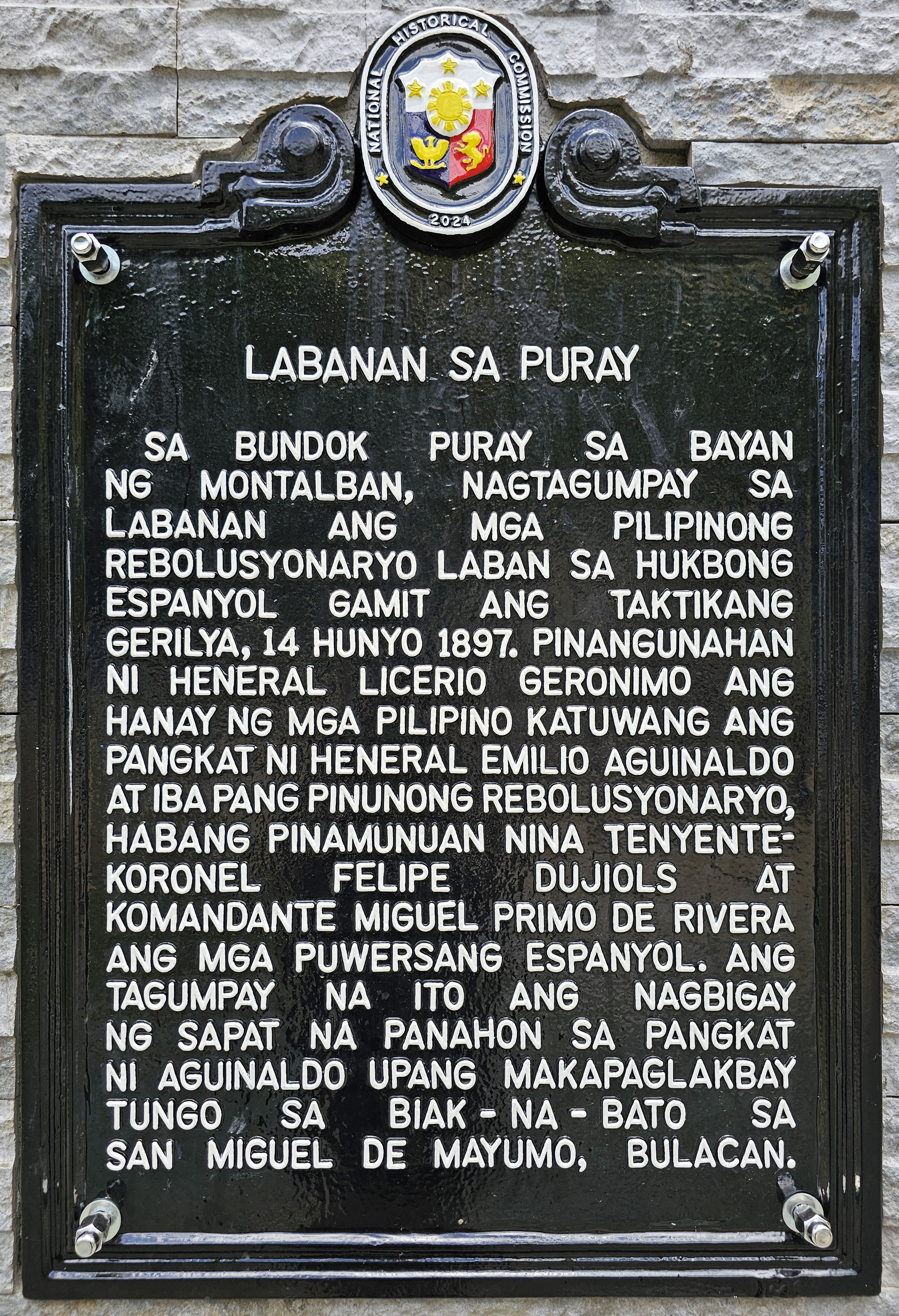
- National Historical Commission marker
Date	June 14, 1897
Location	Mount Puray, Montalban, Captaincy General of the Philippines (now Barangay Puray, Rodriguez, Rizal, Philippines)
Result	Filipino victory End of the Cavite-Morong Retreat

Belligerents
Filipino Revolutionary Government	Spanish Empire

Commanders and leaders
Emilio Aguinaldo; Licerio Geronimo	Fernando Primo de Rivera; Felipe Dujiols; Miguel Primo de Rivera

Strength
500 men	1,500 men

Casualties and losses
Light	Heavy

The Battle of Mount Puray (Filipino: Labanan sa Bundok ng Puray, Spanish: Batalla de Monte Puray), sometimes known as Battle of Mount Purog (Filipino: Labanan sa Bundok ng Purog, Spanish: Batalla de Monte Purog) was a significant engagement fought on June 14, 1897, during the Philippine Revolution. It took place between the Philippine revolutionary forces led by Revolutionary President Emilio Aguinaldo and the Spanish colonial forces acting under the command of Governor-General Fernando Primo de Rivera.

The Filipino revolutionaries, commanded by General Licerio Gerónimo, along with Pío del Pilar, Hermogines Bautista, Mariano Salvador, and Pablo Astilla, achieved a significant victory after a bloody six-hour battle. The Spanish army, which had been pursuing Aguinaldo’s forces from Cavite, was crushed and routed. This victory marked a turning point for the revolutionaries, as it ended their arduous retreat from Cavite to Morong. It also allowed them to establish a new revolutionary headquarters in the vicinity of the battlefield.

Eventually, it led to the creation of the Biac-Na-Bato headquarters in Bulacan, where the Republic of Biak-na-Bato would later be proclaimed.

In 2024, the National Historical Commission installed a marker for the battle.

== Prelude ==
Filipino revolutionaries who joined Aguinaldo and his staff evacuated Cavite after the fall of most of its territory to the Spanish. The retreat commenced from a remote village in Dasmariñas, and it took via Laguna until they reached the hills of Mount Puray which was in the hilly eastern part of the town of Montalban. From there they were met by a Morong-based army led by Licerio Geronimo, and thence set up temporary camp until word reached that a huge Spanish column led by Colonel Felipe Dujiols was on its way to meet them.

== Battle ==
With the oncoming Spanish attack, Aguinaldo then commanded his troops to dig temporary trenches facing downwards from Mount Puray. Filipino units led by sub-commander Licerio Geronimo were positioned at their appropriate areas of defense. The thick forest of the hills also helped the Filipino defenders from the firepower of Spanish machine guns and artillery present. The Spanish column which is several times larger than that of the Filipino force present, had now arrived at the foot of the hill and encamped themselves there. Once in position, they were then ordered by Dujiols to promptly attack the hill which they did, although he was under express orders by Primo de Rivera not to engage until he and his reinforcements arrive in the field. For six hours the Spanish though more numerous predictably suffered heavy losses under Filipino enfilade fire coming from the dugouts and thickets, and they retreated back towards their camp. Hours later, when Aguinaldo finally felt the initiative passed to his, he ordered some Filipinos to steal and wear the uniforms of the dead Spaniards and had them pretend to be among them, before sending them to infiltrate the Spanish camp where they caused confusion and then promptly ambushed the camp, suffering even more losses of dead and wounded upon the Spanish who then retreated from the field back as far away as into the town center of San Mateo in disorder.

== Aftermath ==
The Filipinos won their first battle in months, and the battle at Mount Puray proved to be a much-needed morale raiser for them and the revolutionary endeavor. News of Aguinaldo's victory in battle spread to other provinces, as a result by early August the province of Cavite, despite being reverted to Spanish control some months earlier, is once again in open revolt, seriously jeopardizing efforts to pacify the province.

Aguinaldo then set up his temporary headquarters in Mount Puray, and from there revolutionary commanders from across different provinces, including Mariano Llanera of Nueva Ecija and Francisco Macabulos of Tarlac, convened there for a time. The area was deemed too close to the front, however, and the revolutionary headquarters eventually had to be moved out to Norzagaray and then Angat until it was finalized at Biak-na-Bato in Bulacan by June 24 some distance north. Geronimo's force of Morong rebels had to stay behind Mount Puray to check any effort of Spanish pursuit while the revolutionary government relocates to a more secure location up north. From thence, it became the new capital of the Filipino revolutionary government, from which he, as the revolutionary president, would issue orders to be spread across the whole Philippine archipelago for the locals to rise up against the Spanish yoke, thereby extending the revolution from just eight of the original provinces who first rose up in revolt to include all of the Philippines.

== See also ==
- Republic of Biak-na-Bato
- Battle of Aliaga
