= Biak-na-Bato National Park =

National park in the Philippines

- IUCN category V (protected landscape/seascape)
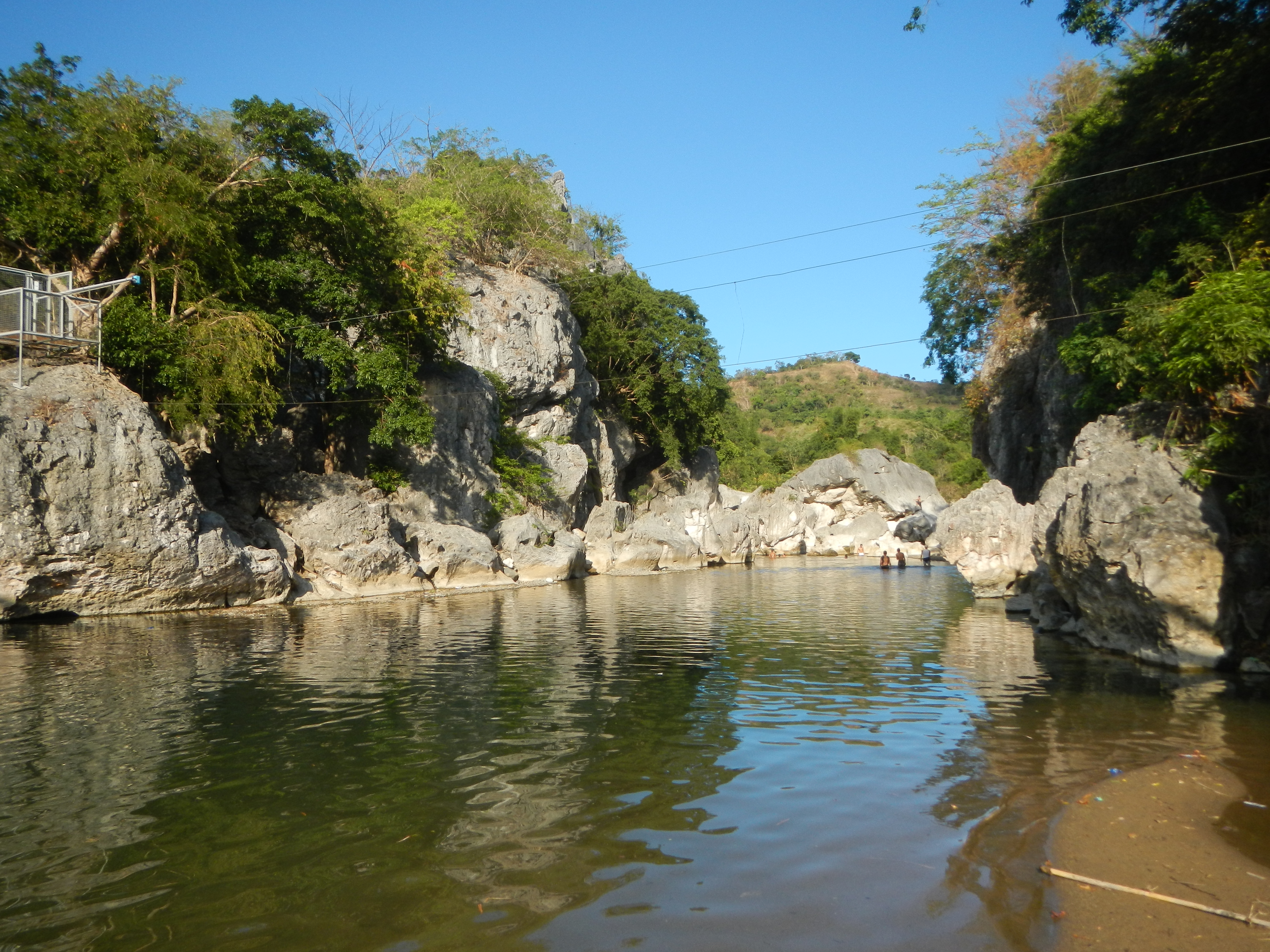
- Madlum River

- Location within Philippines
- Location: San Miguel, Bulacan, Philippines
- Coordinates: 15.118879°N 121.085081°E
- Area: 2,117 hectares (5,230 acres)
- Established: November 16, 1937
- Governing body: Department of Environment and Natural Resources

Biak-na-Bato National Park is a protected area of the Philippines located almost entirely within Barangay Biak-na-Bato in San Miguel, Bulacan from where it derives its name. The park also extends to the nearby municipalities of San Ildefonso and Doña Remedios Trinidad covering a total area of 2,117 hectares (5,230 acres). It was declared a national park in 1937 by President Manuel L. Quezon by virtue of its association with the history and site of the Republic of Biak-na-Bato. The park consists of a cave network and a system of rivers and trails of both historical and ecological importance. Situated only 80 kilometers (50 mi) northeast from Manila, it is fast becoming a popular weekend eco-adventure destination for the city dwellers.

== Topography and ecology ==
Biak-na-Bato National Park is centered on a mountain gorge sliced by the Balaong River in the Sierra Madre mountain range. More than a hundred caves of varying sizes and crystalline mineral formations are spread across the park. Among the most explored caves are the Aguinaldo Cave, once the headquarters of President Emilio Aguinaldo, and the Bahay Paniki or Bat Cave. The latter cave, in particular, is named because of the many bats that reside in the cave, with the surroundings smelling of bat feces. The feces or guano are noted to be used as a fertilizer by the locals. Orchids, trees, shrubs, ferns, bushes and bokawe (buho) are some of the flora than can be found in the park.

Observation outposts of the former republic as well as ruins of stone fortifications also abound within the park, including a stone cliff with carvings, possibly over a hundred years old.

Mount Susong Dalaga and Tilandong Falls are also popular attractions inside the park.

There are also a few other popular places, like caves, to tourists such as the "Yungib Cave" where you'll find some human bones and "Tanggapan Cave" which is derived from the Tagalog word tanggapan (response). There are more caves like "Ambush Cave", and "Pahingahan Cave".

== Recent events ==
In September 2004, eight people, seven of which were children and teenagers, drowned in Madlum River in Biak-na-Bato National Park. The official report tells that the victims were swept away by flash floods while picnicking in the area. According to then-Governor Josie dela Cruz, illegal logging and mining operations were to blame for such incidents.

On a memorandum dated December 28, 2010, a 6-year struggle by the people of Bulacan to halt the quarrying and mining operations in Biak-na-Bato National Park has come to an end when DENR decided that the permit given to Rosemoor Mining and Development Corp violated the Philippine Mining Act of 1995. The appeal to repeal the mining permit was due to fear of the desecration of the historical site and continued loss of life due to flash floods and land slides.

Joselito Mendoza, the then-representative of Bulacan's 3rd district, filed House Bill No. 2713 on September 3, 2013, that sought to reinstate the original 2,117-hectare (5,230-acre) land area of the National Park.

On August 19, 2014, seven people, all tourism college students of the Bulacan State University who had their field trip at the area, were killed by raging floodwaters at the Madlum River. The flood might have been caused by a heavy downpour on Mount Manalmon.

== Facts ==
- Trinidad Tecson, so called "Mother of Biak na Bato", was born here.

== Gallery ==
Biak-na-Bato National Park
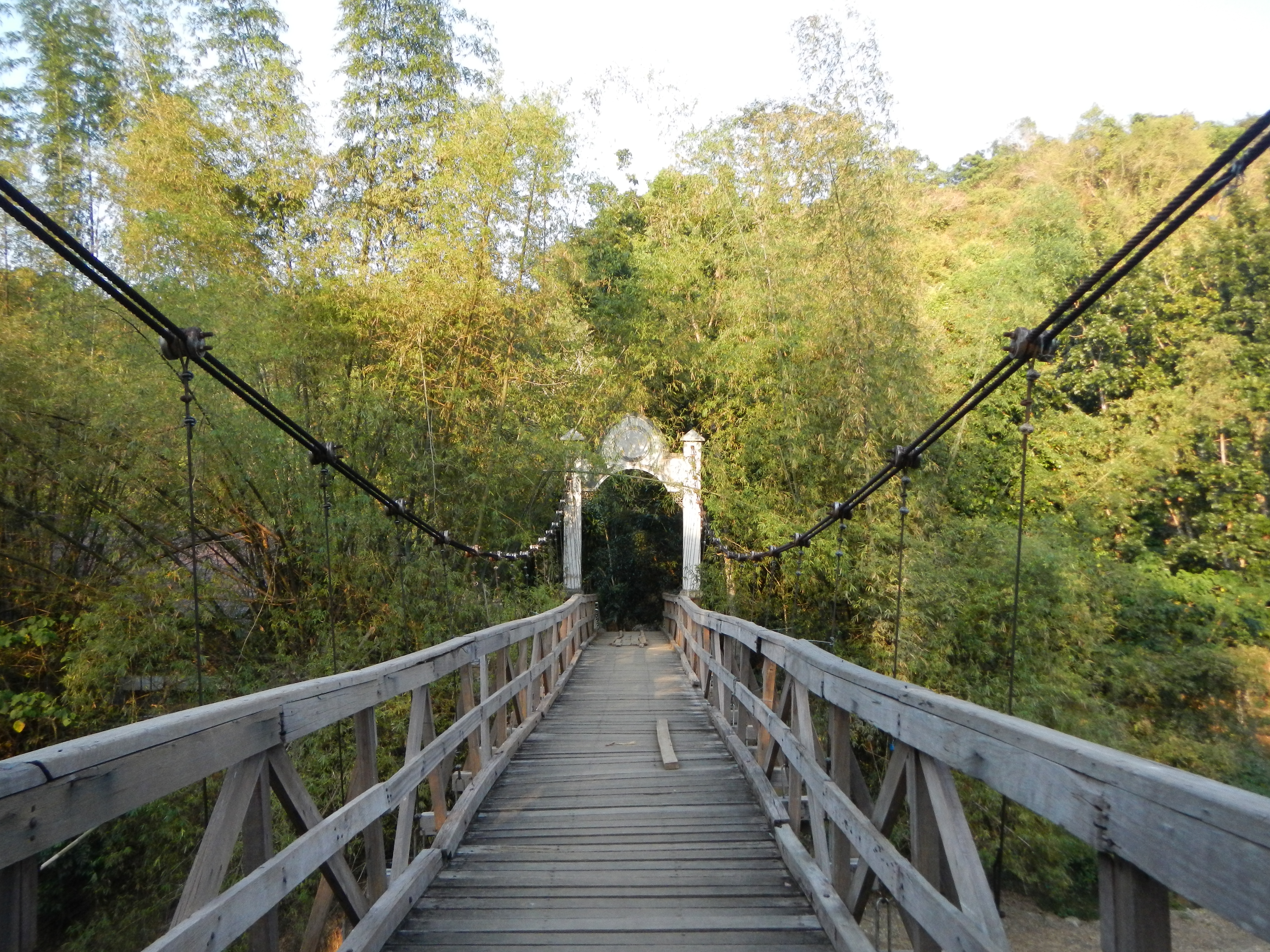

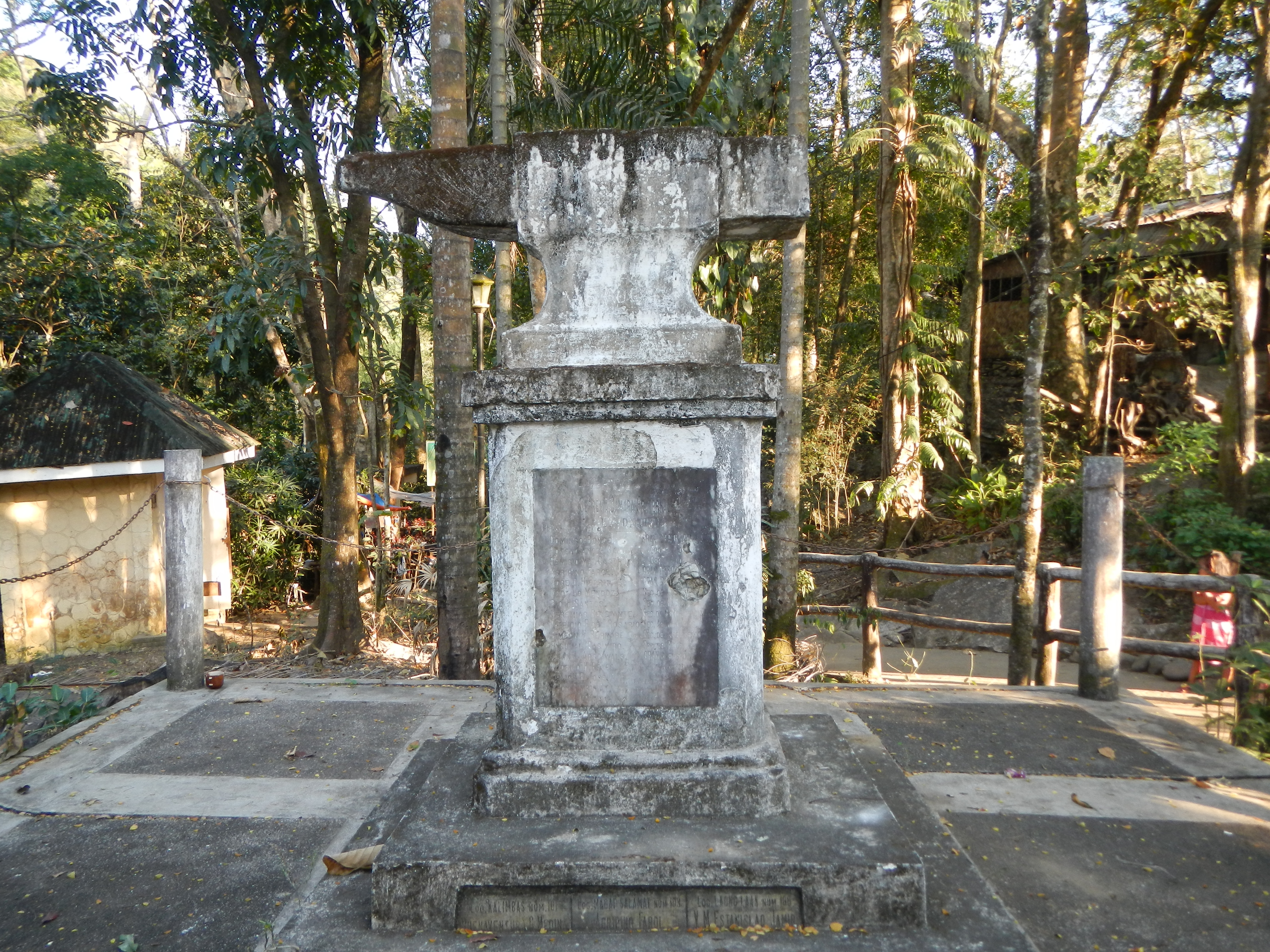

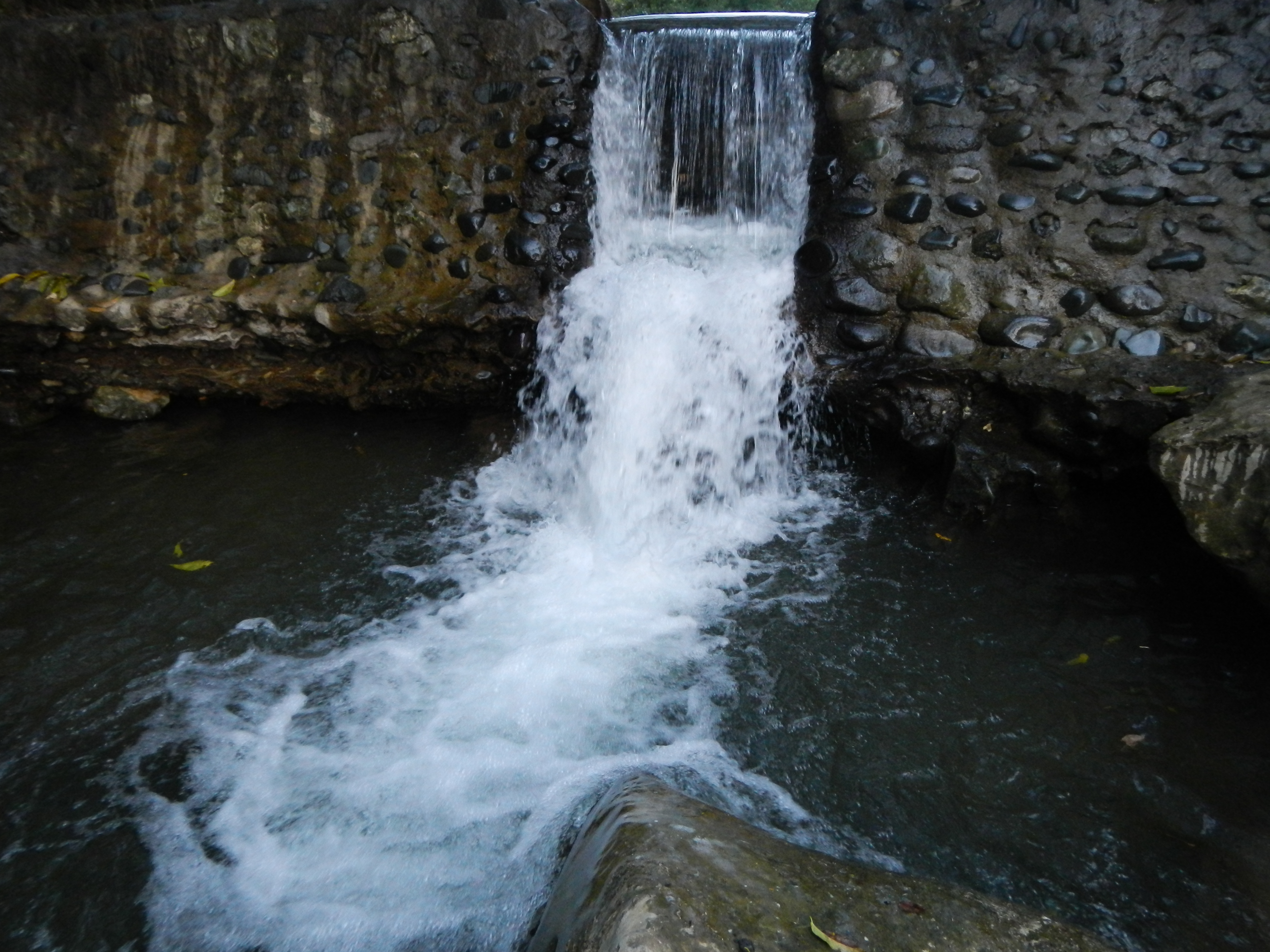

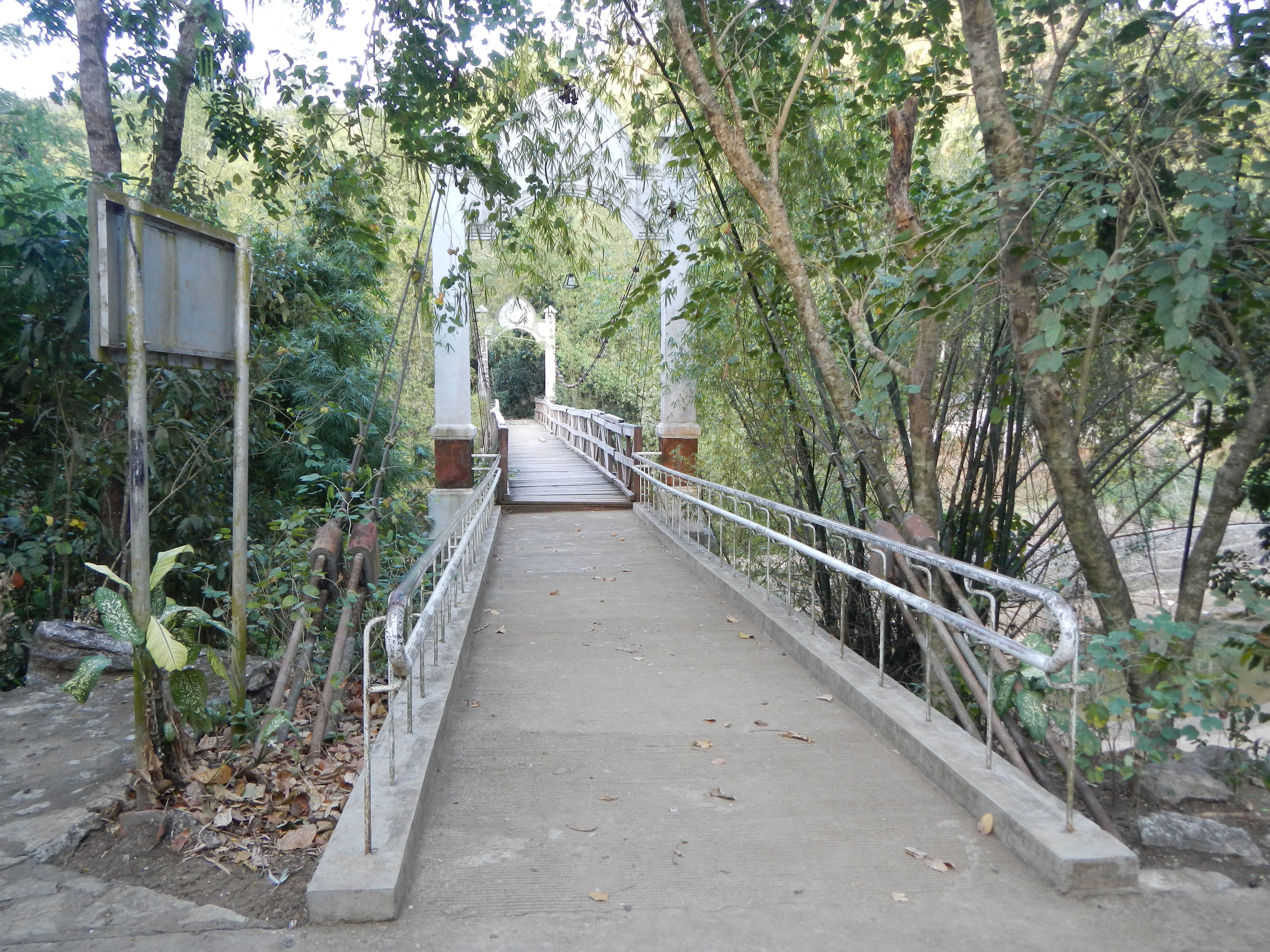

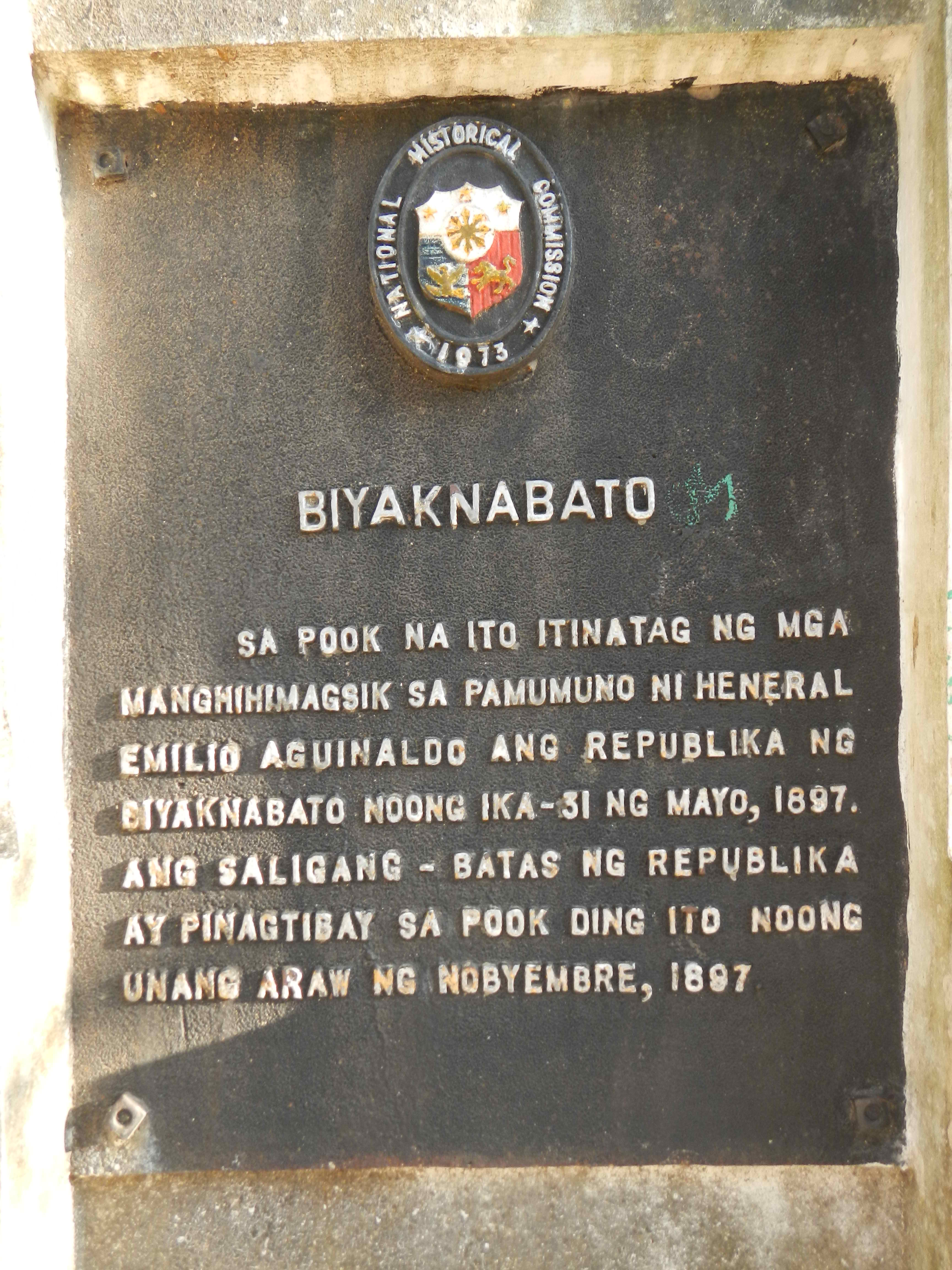

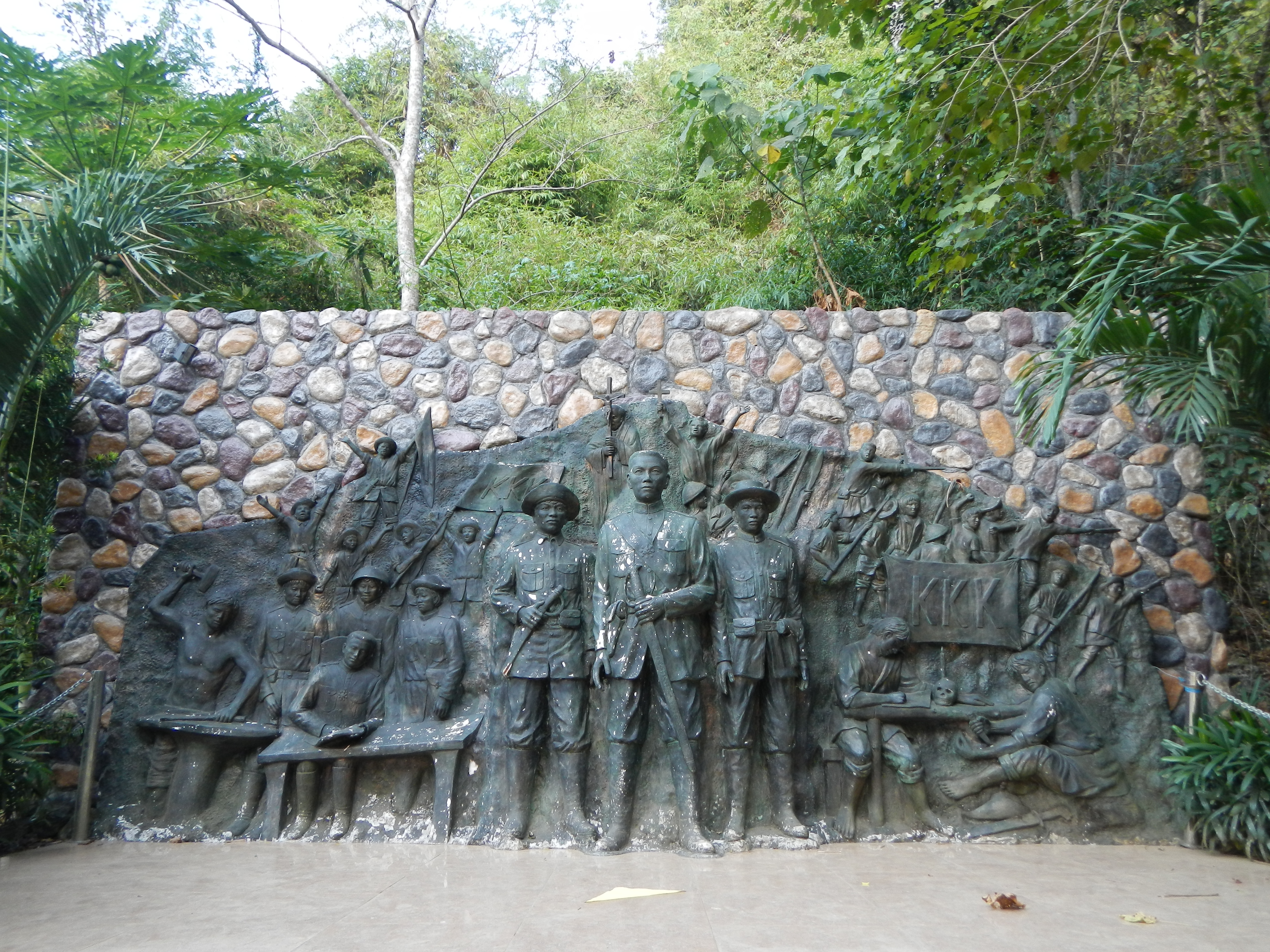

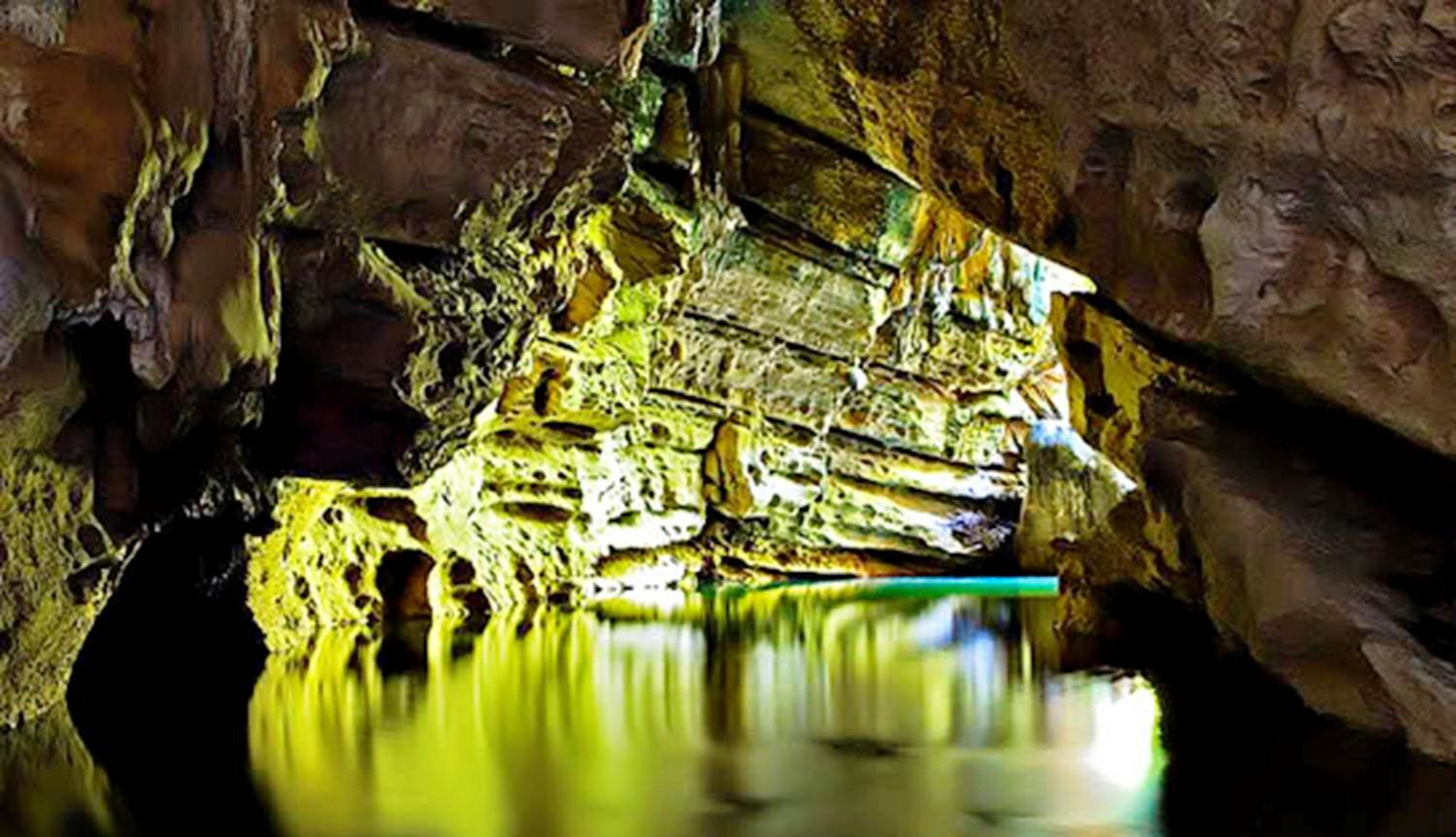

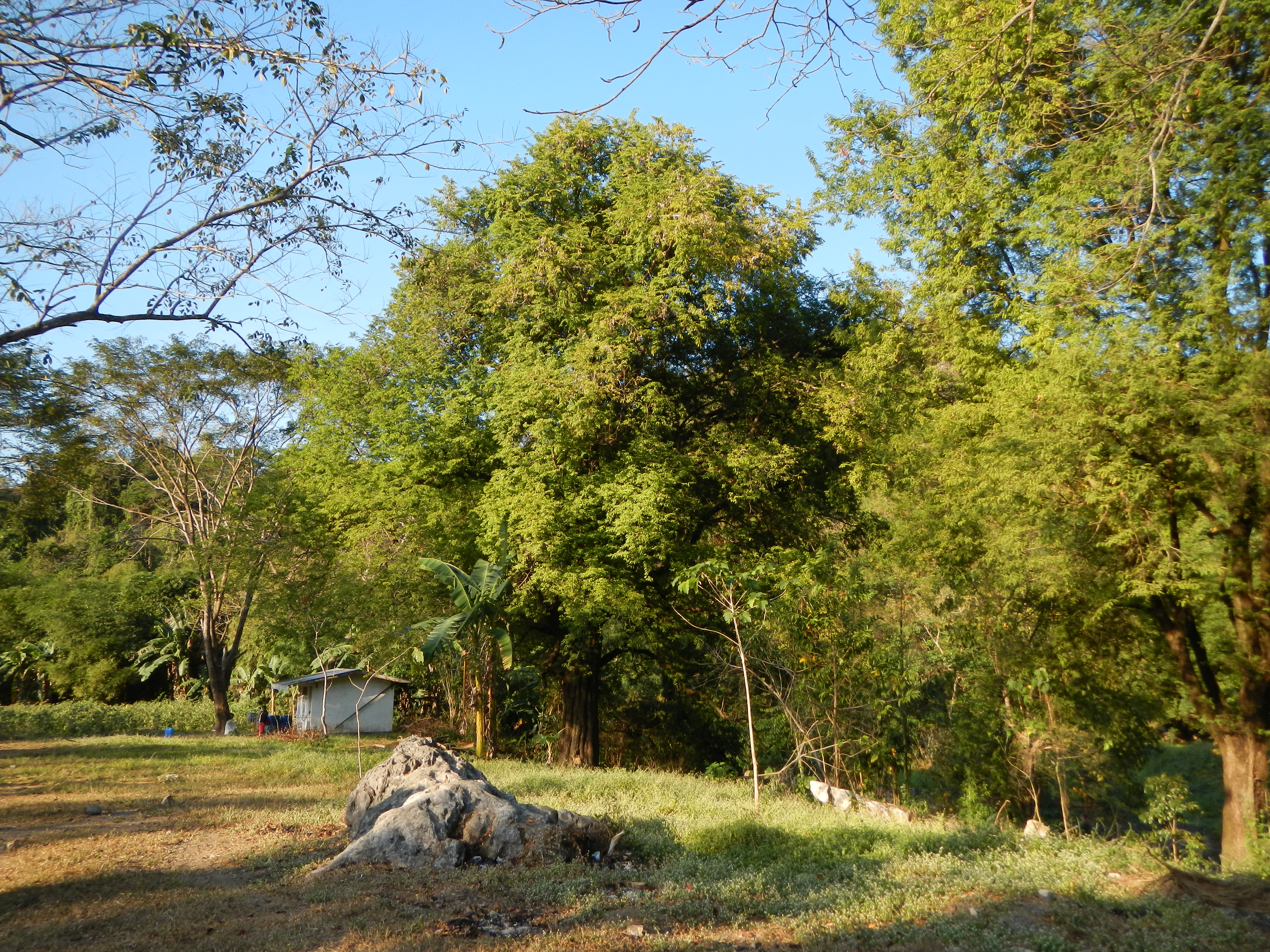

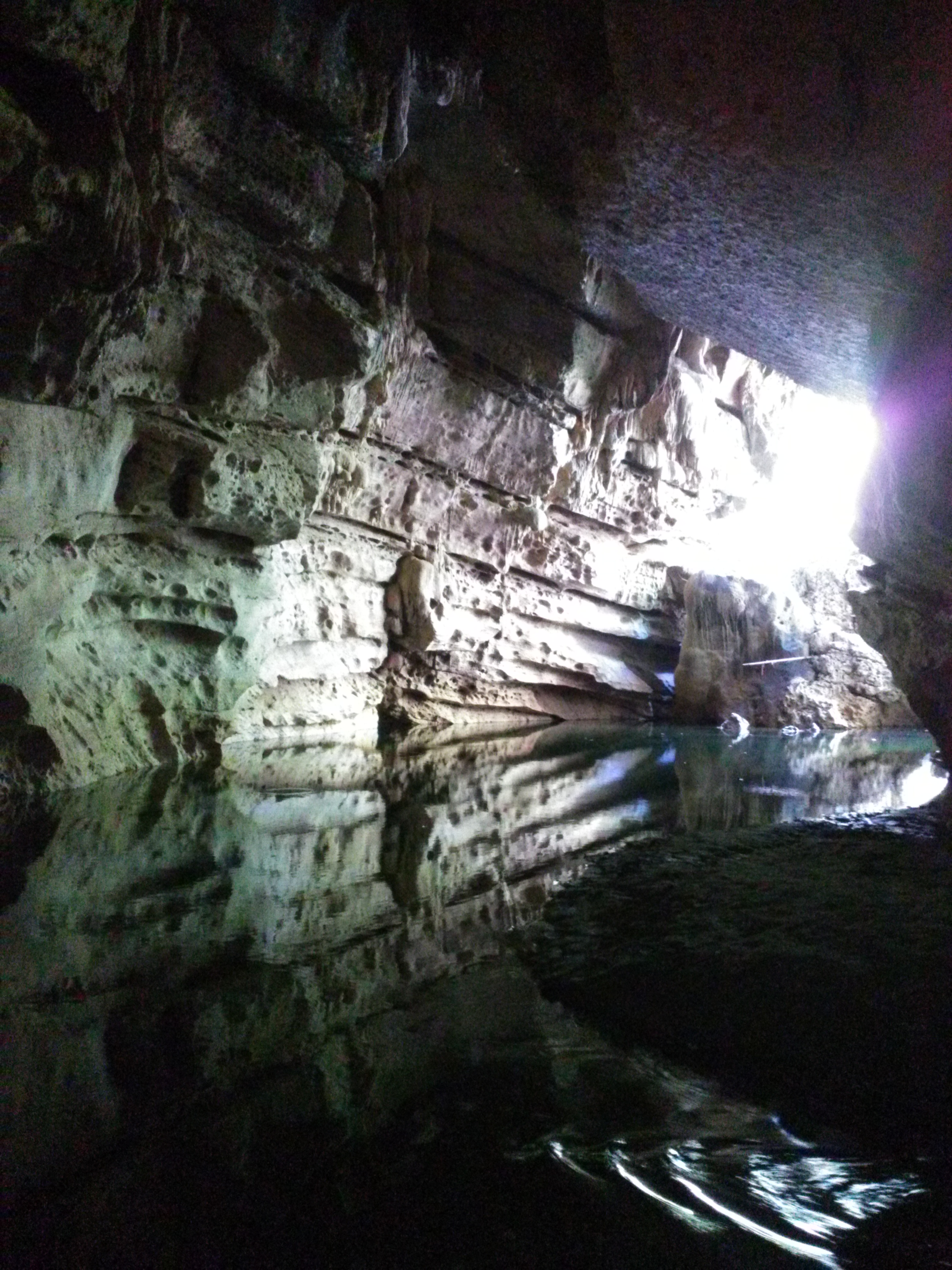

== See also ==
- List of national parks of the Philippines
