= General Aguinaldo =

General Aguinaldo may refer to:

- Baldomero Aguinaldo (1869–1915), Philippine Revolutionary Army general
- Críspulo Aguinaldo (1863–1897), Philippine Revolutionary Army lieutenant general
- Emilio Aguinaldo (1869–1964), Philippine Revolutionary Army general
