= On-Foot =

Television series

- Created by: Tim Tayag
- Developed by: Burger Bacon Production
- Directed by: Tim Tayag, Allan Manalo, Theodore Gonzalves
- Starring: Tim Tayag
- Country of origin: Philippines
- No. of episodes: 20

Production
- Executive producers: Tim tayag, Katrina Holigores, Leo Udtohan
- Running time: 3 times a day

Original release
- Network: LAC
- Release: September 2001 – present

On-Foot (Travel show) is a travel show on the Living Asia Channel. The show follows the comic and upbeat television host Tim Tayag around the Philippine and Asian countries.

The program is a co-production of Bacon Burger Productions and CCI Asia Group Corporation and is being aired in the Philippines via The Living Asia Channel. It is also being aired simultaneously in North America via The Filipino Channel Direct. In Asia, the channel can be seen in Singapore, Malaysia, Vietnam and Laos as well via The Mabuhay Satellite Corporation.

In the Philippines, The Living Asia Channel is currently aired on major cable networks such as Home, Dream, Destiny and Sky. On-Foot is everyday three times a day on an eight-hour loop seen simultaneously in the other countries with broadcast partners.

== Objectives ==
According to Tayag's official website, On-Foot is aimed at young independent travelers; a sort of streetwise cookbook for traveling alone. When you travel on foot and interact with the locals, you penetrate the veneer of the guidebooks and maps and mine the grit of real life. Self-proclaimed traveltologist, Tayag, provides a comic element while the show highlights concise information and thorough coverage of the destination via humorous pop up graphics and animation. The program explores unusual places, samples unusual dishes and purchases unusual gift items. The show is targeted to Filipinos both here and abroad who want to encounter the lighter side and offbeat experiences of traveling in the Philippines and other Asian countries. On-Foot is an indispensable resource with practical information that can be used by every traveler.

In the course of each show, Tayag tours each place and interacts with the town's locals occasionally with the use of subtitles for the viewers from other countries).

== History ==
The show's initial seed was planted in Tayag's mind back when he was living in San Francisco circa 2000. He came back to the Philippines and met Katrina Holigores, a female mover and shaker in the film industry. The idea man and cinematographer woman build a partnership that involved a lot of meetings.

Holigores used her vast connections to form the proper production team to produce this show. So the band of three was formed: Tim as the host and writer, Holigores as the director and half-time cinematographer, and a fellow by the name of Alan Bengzon to bring in steadicam operation and other useful equipment.

Tayag met Leo Udtohan in 2006, a journalist from Bohol who produced four episodes on Bohol and Siquijor, Tayag in an interview said, "Bohol is the best episode so far on On-Foot."

== Episodes ==
• Quiapo

• Baguio (2008)

• Cebu (2008)

• Siquijor (2007)

• Baguio 1 (2007)

• Baguio 2 (2007)

• Boracay (2007)

• Batangas (2008)

• Bohol 1 Bizarre Bohol(2007)

• Bohol 2 Bizarre Bohol(2007)

• Bohol 1 Bizarre Bohol(2006)

• Bohol 2 Bizarre Bohol(2006)

• Malaysia (2007)

• Malaysia 2 (2007)

• Nature Spa: Tagaytay (2008)

• Off the Wall 1 (2007)

• One Foot in Iloilo (2007)

• One Foot on Iloilo 2 (2007)

• Palawan (2007)

• Sagada (2007)

• Sagada 2

• Siargao (2007)

• Siargao 2 (2007)

== Sources ==
- http://timtayag.com/
- http://livingasiachannel.net/onfoot/index.html
- http://www.philstar.com/Article.aspx?articleId=356963
