= Immaculate Conception Parish Church (Dasmariñas) =

Roman Catholic church in Cavite, Philippines

Dasmariñas Church
- Immaculate Conception Parish Church
- Parokya ng La Inmaculada Concepcion (Filipino)
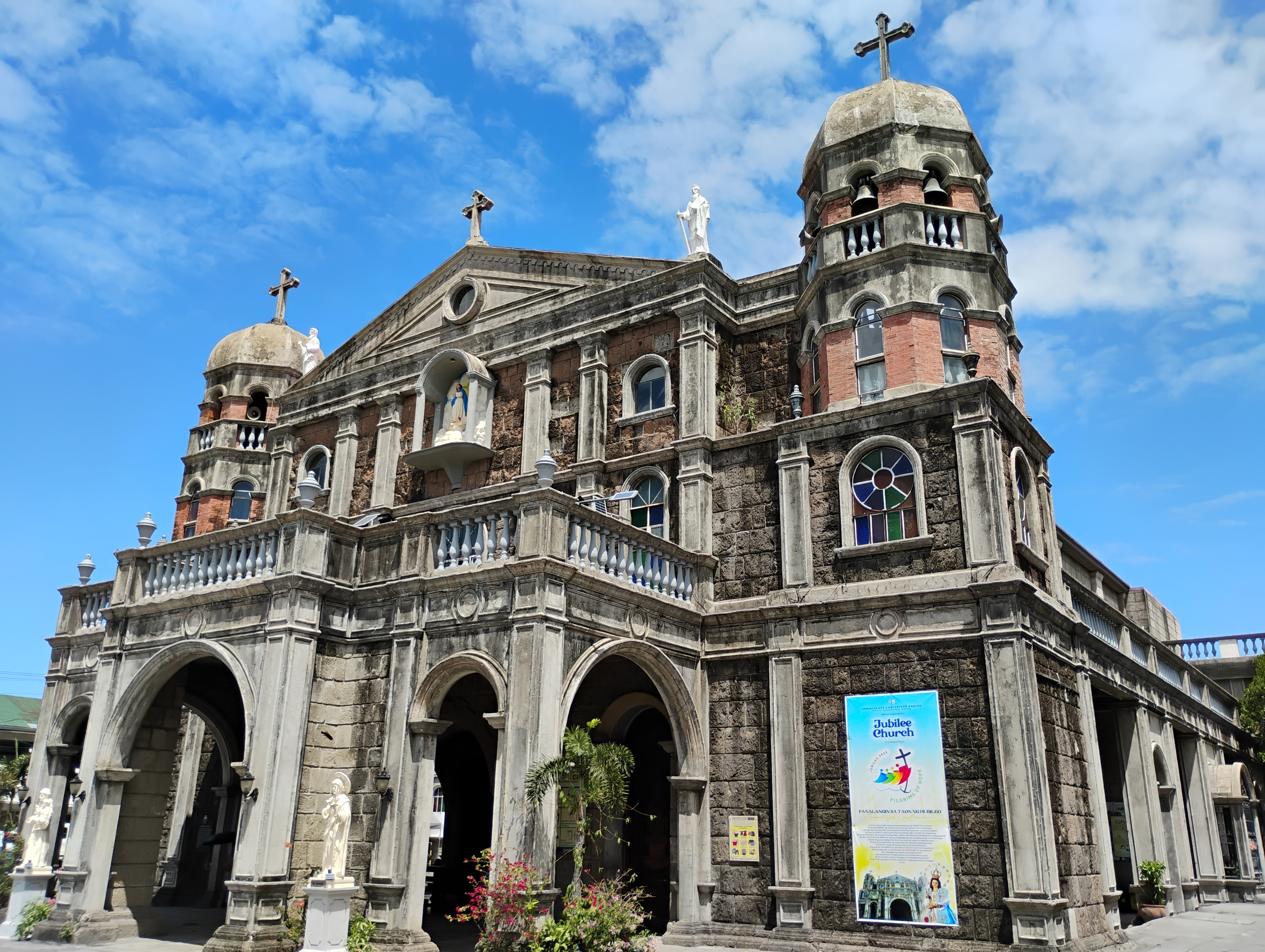
- Church facade in 2025

- Location in Luzon Location in the Philippines
- 14°19′37″N 120°56′10″E
- Location: Dasmariñas, Cavite
- Country: Philippines
- Denomination: Roman Catholic

History
- Status: Church building
- Founded: October 21, 1866
- Founder: Augustinian Recollects
- Dedication: Immaculate Conception
- Dedicated: 1867
- Events: Battle of Perez Dasmariñas

Architecture
- Functional status: Active, Under renovation
- Heritage designation: Marked Historical Structure of the Philippines
- Designated: 1986
- Architectural type: Church building
- Style: Neoclassical Baroque
- Groundbreaking: 1867

Specifications
- Length: 180 feet (55 m)
- Width: 80 feet (24 m)
- Materials: Stone, bricks and wood

Administration
- Province: Ecclesiastical Province of Manila
- Archdiocese: Roman Catholic Archdiocese of Manila
- Diocese: Roman Catholic Diocese of Imus

The Immaculate Conception Parish Church, also known as Dasmariñas Church, is the first Roman Catholic parish church in the city of Dasmariñas, province of Cavite, Philippines. It is under the jurisdiction of the Diocese of Imus. The stone church was constructed right after the establishment of Dasmariñas as a separate parish in 1866. The church and convent was the site of bloodshed during the Battle of Perez Dasmariñas as of the Philippine revolution against Spain. It was declared as an important historical structure by the National Historical Institute (now National Historical Commission of the Philippines) with the placing of a historical marker in 1986.

On December 7, 2002, the Venerated and Miraculous Image of the Patroness of the City of Dasmariñas—the Lady of Immaculate Conception—was Episcopally Crowned by the Bishop Emeritus of Imus Most Rev. Manuel Sobreviñas D.D.; the next day, on the Occasion of The Solemnity of the Immaculate Conception, the Parish Church was Dedicated to God by then Bishop of Imus Most Rev. Luis Antonio G. Tagle SthD. It celebrated its 150th Jubilee Year on July 5, 2017.

== History ==
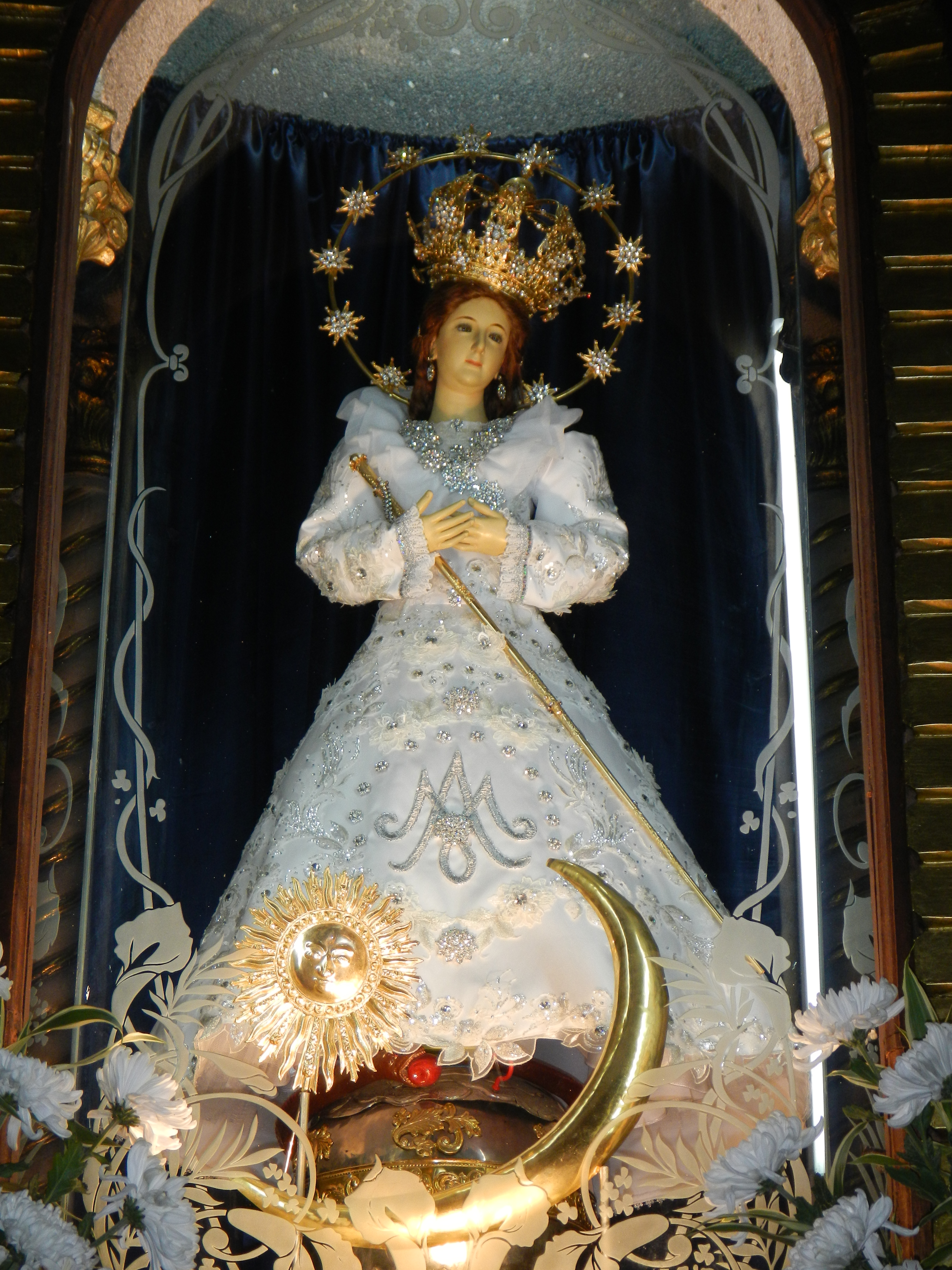
The image of the Virgin Mary as the Immaculate Conception at the Dasmariñas Church

The parish of Dasmariñas, then known as Perez-Dasmariñas, started as a chapel of parish of Imus, its former mother town, during the Spanish colonial period. Perez-Dasmariñas then was a barrio and part of the Hacienda de Imus (Imus Estate) owned and administered by the Augustinian Recollects. After the establishment of Perez-Dasmariñas as a politically separate town on May 12, 1864, a petition was sent to Madrid by the Recollects for the creation of a new parish for the sake of the people of a growing town and for their own interests. Hence, on October 21, 1866, Her Most Catholic Majesty Queen Isabella II signed the Royal Order creating the new parish of Perez-Dasmariñas. The Royal Order states:

"Her Majesty, the Queen, conceded to approve by a Royal Order last October 21, 1866, the erection of a new parish in the new town of Perez-Dasmariñas, independent from Imus, its origin, in the province of Cavite. With previous instructions from the proceedings where the interested parties were and for reason of convenience and need that the said town should constitute an independent parish...with the use of all corresponding authority because of its sacredness and furthermore, in accordance with the Council of Trent, Chapter IV Section XXIV about Reformation which is in accord with Law No. XXX first book on Recopilacion de las Indias, we have established jurisdiction separate from Imus, her origin. The limits of this new parish shall be Religious Order of the Augustinian Recollect Fathers."

However, Royal Orders took some time before it reached the Islands and its actual implementation did not start till the following year, 1867. The new parish of Perez-Dasmariñas was placed under the patronage of the Virgin Mary as Our Lady of the Immaculate Conception with the Archbishop of Manila and the Recollect Prior Provincial as its main proponents. The same year, Recollect priest Valentin Diaz was installed as the first parish priest of Perez-Dasmariñas.

=== Construction of the church ===
The stone church of Perez-Dasmariñas was built with the establishment of the parish. Don Esperidion Arevalo of Santa Cruz, Manila, a famous sculptor, was commissioned by the Recollect Provincial to carve the image of La Purisima Concepcion (Immaculate Conception) in 1867. Arevalo was the same artist who made the classical type of retablo of Church of Imus in 1851.

Very little information are available regarding the architectural design of the church. Old photographs taken towards the end of the Spanish rule showed that the church had a very simple facade without a belfry. The convent is nicely built with a spacious veranda. The parish of Maragondon lent the sum of $1,000 (Mexican) for the repairs and renovation of the church of Perez-Dasmariñas in 1874. Later in 1880, San Francisco de Malabon (now General Trias) lent $500 (Mexican) to Perez-Dasmariñas for the same purpose.

Church exterior features

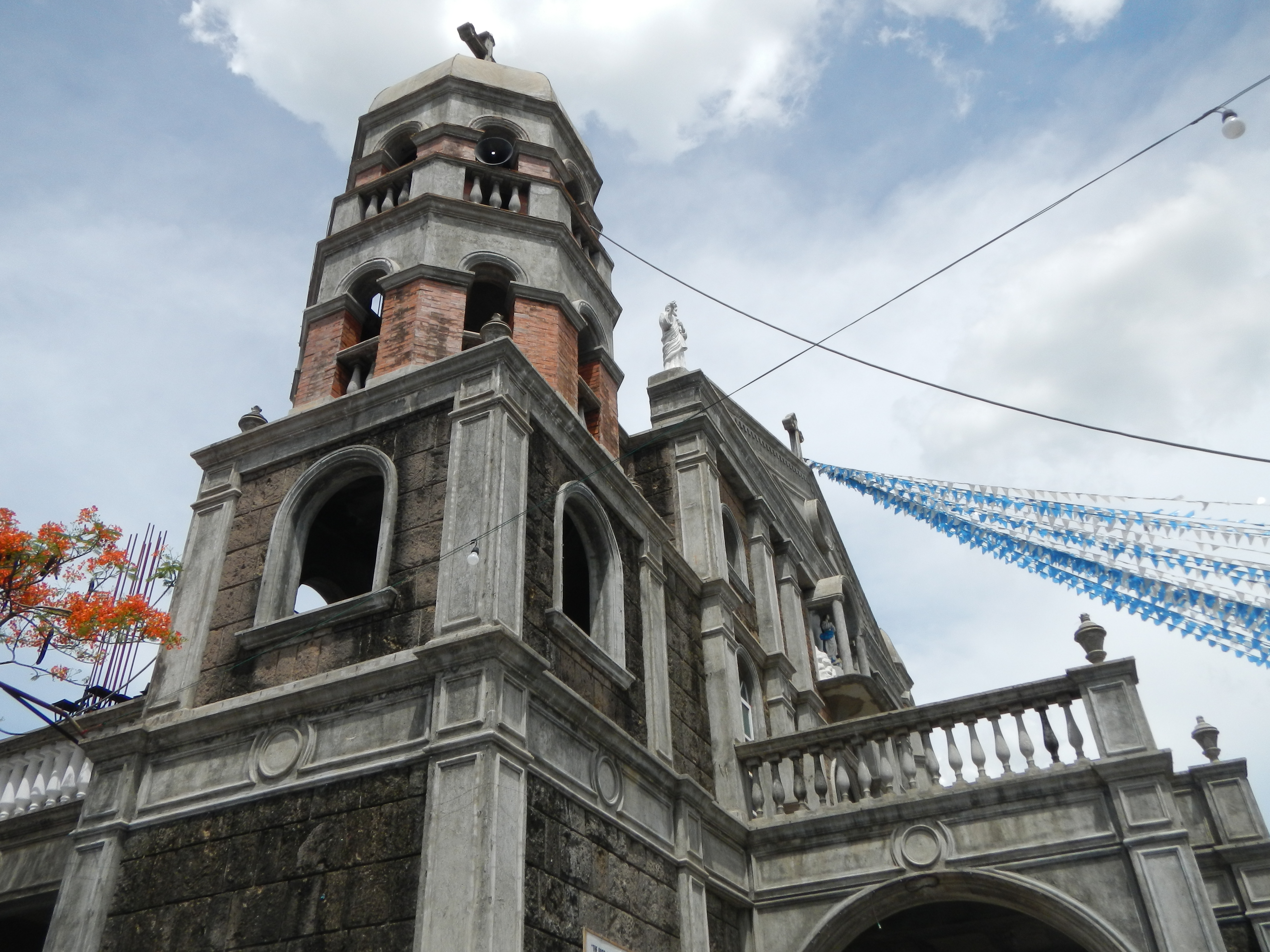
One of the bell towers of the church

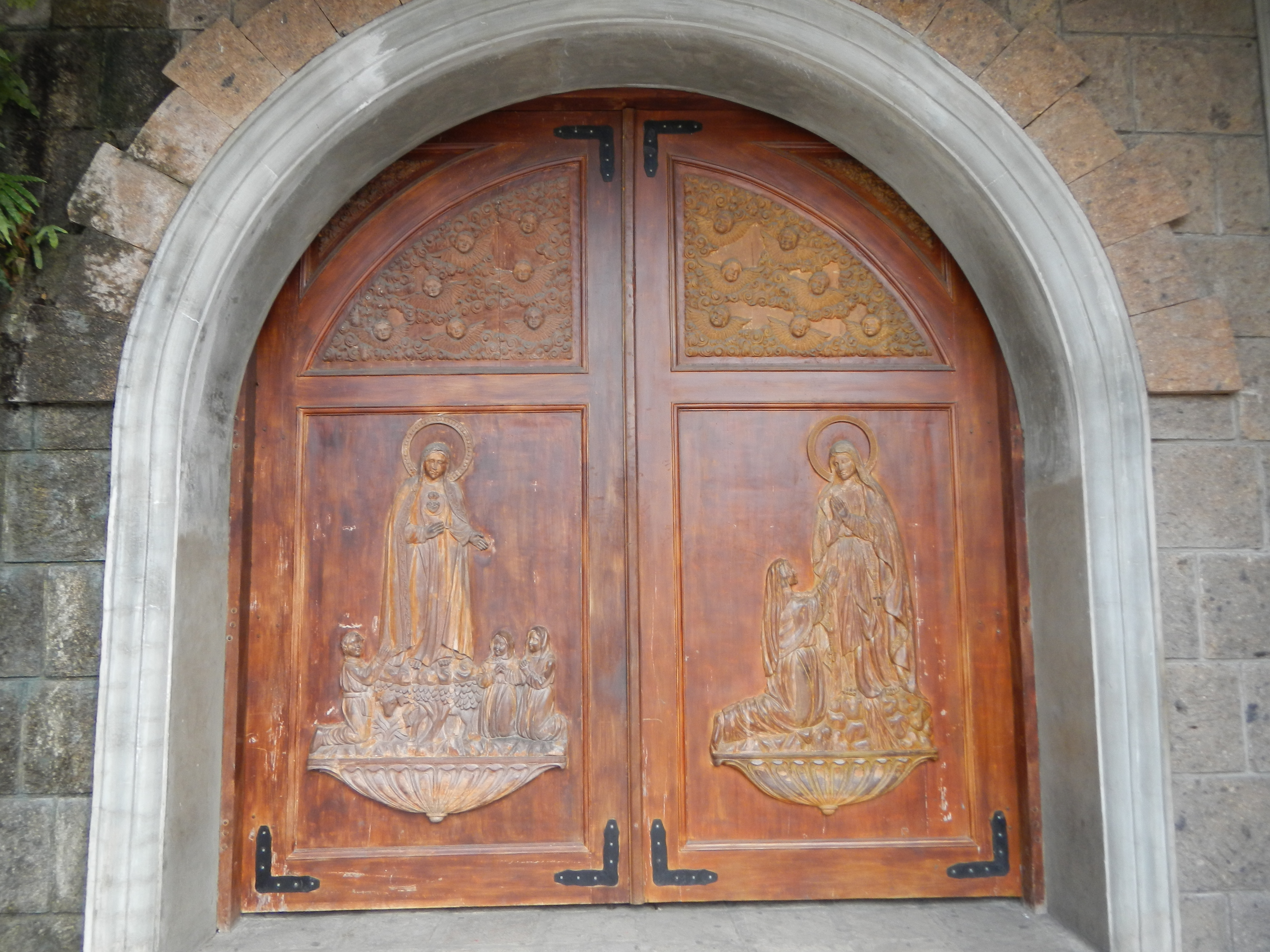
One of the front doors of the church

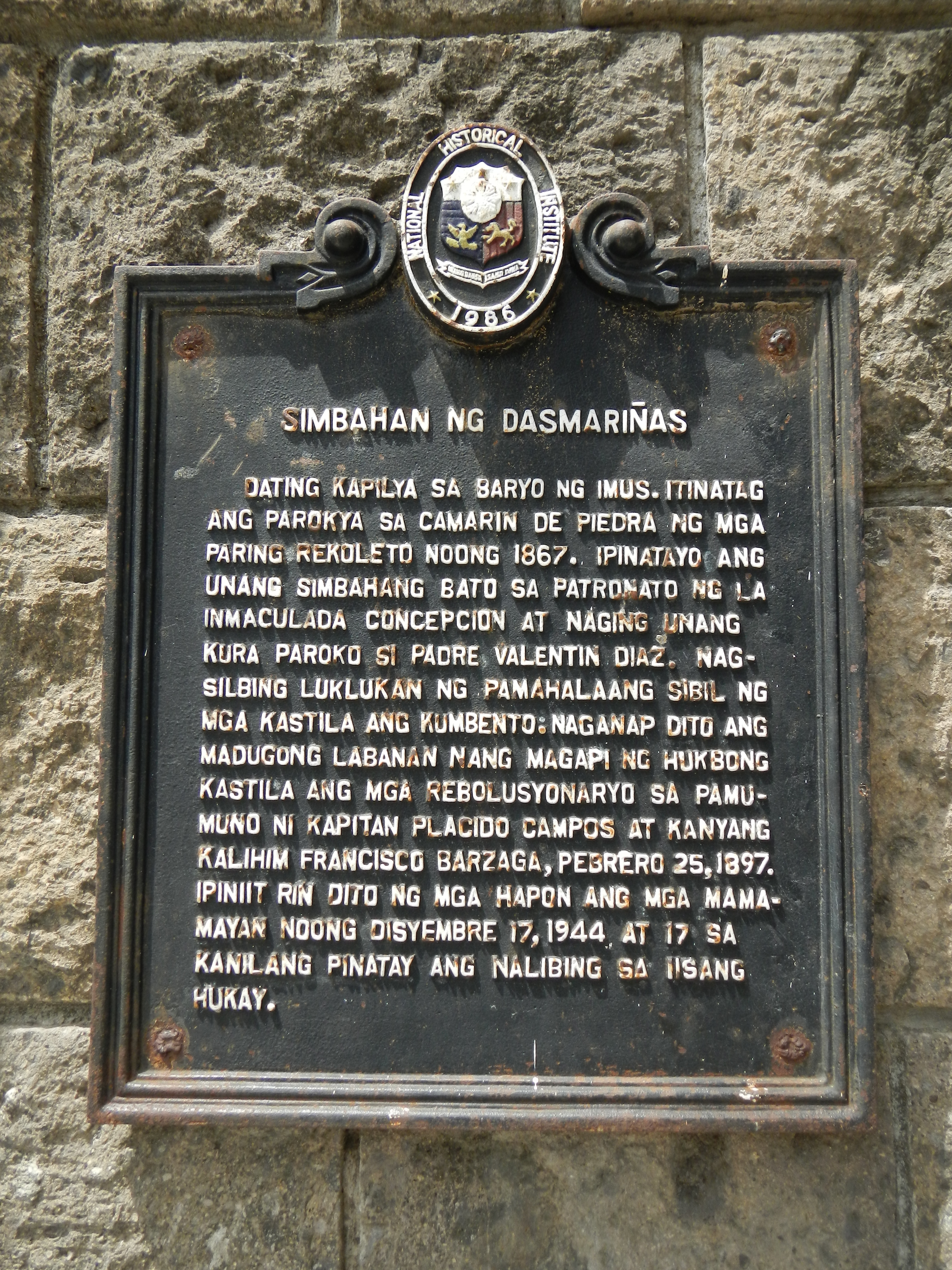
Church NHI historical marker installed in 1986

The present church has a neoclassical design with a portico covering the front door of the church. The facade is flanked on both sides by bell towers, each four-story tall. The parish church had two old bells. One was acquired upon the erection of the parish. This bell, which is small, has the inscription "Perez Dasmariñas año 1867 approx. 14 libras". The second one was donated by the local principalias (upper class) of the town. It was founded in 1890 by the famous Fundicion de Hilario Sunico (Hilario Sunico Foundry) in Manila. The side walls of the structure are flanked by thick buttresses to strengthen the walls from earthquakes.

A school was also established by the Recollects next to the church. The children of Perez-Dasmariñas were taught the basic tenets of the Christian faith and the basic knowledge of counting, reading and writing by the friars. They were required to train and pay good teachers and ensure that basic necessities for teaching purposes were provided. Later, the school was subsidized by the local fund of the town.

The church underwent constant renovations through the years, altering much of the church's original design. At present, the church is undergoing another major renovation which involves the raising of its ceiling.

=== Early curate of the church ===
The first parish priest of Perez-Dasmariñas, Valentin Diaz, was born on November 3, 1837, in Rincon de Soto, Logroño, Spain and was ordained in November 1860. This young missionary was immediately sent to the Philippines and one of his first assignments was Perez-Dasmariñas. He died in Manila on November 20, 1877.

Interior of the Immaculate Conception Parish Church

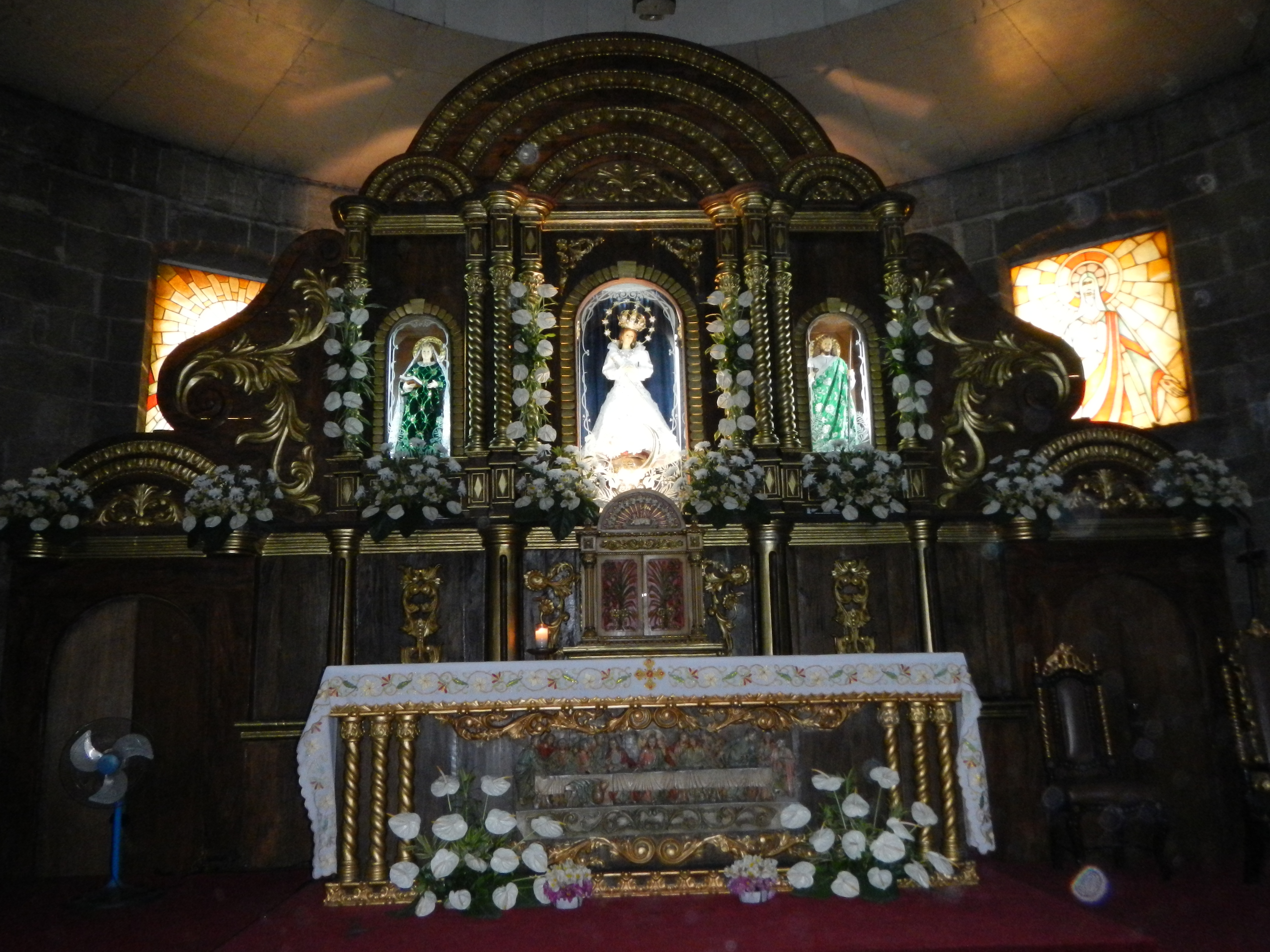
The retablo and main altar

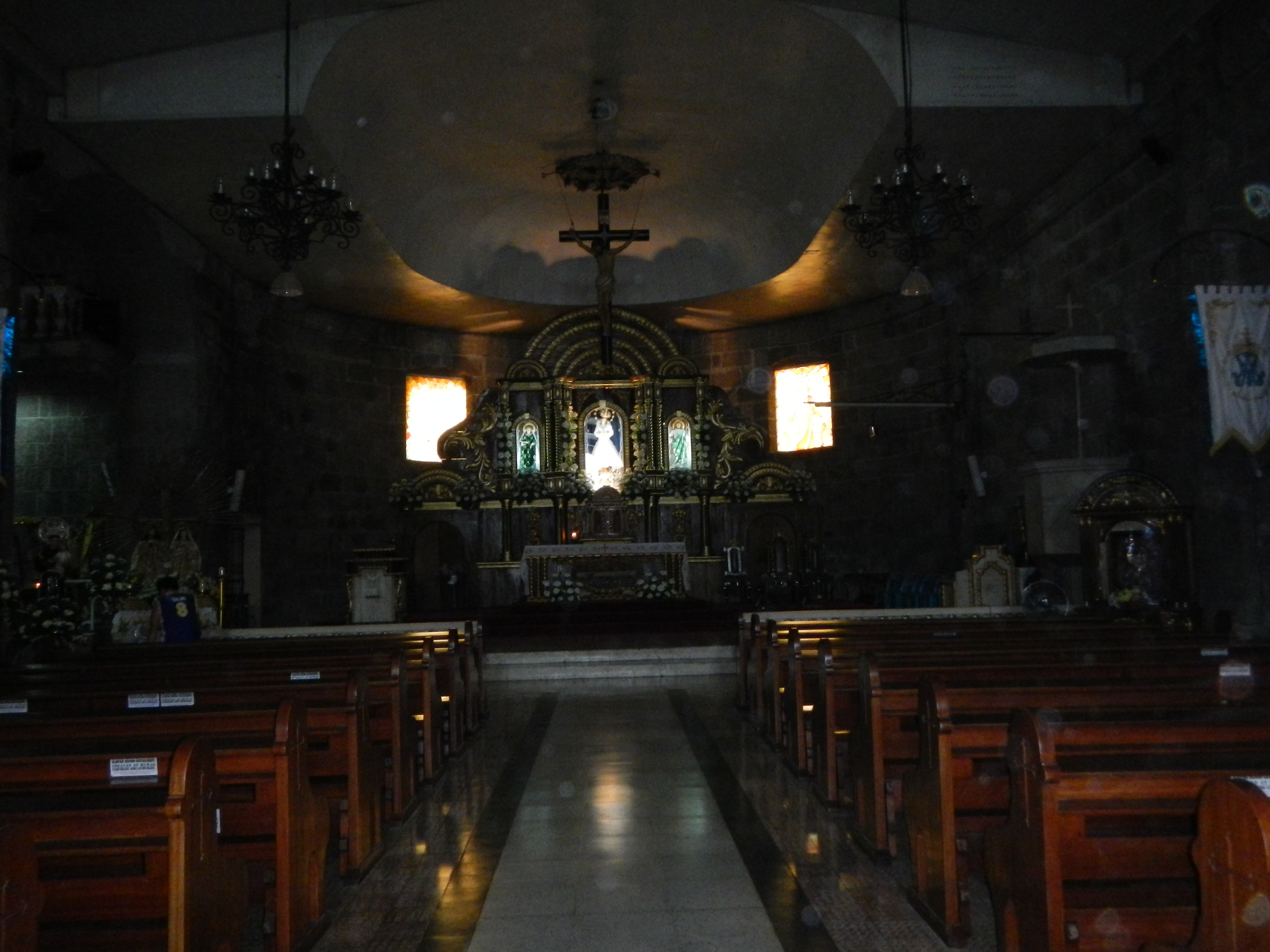
View of the sanctuary from the nave

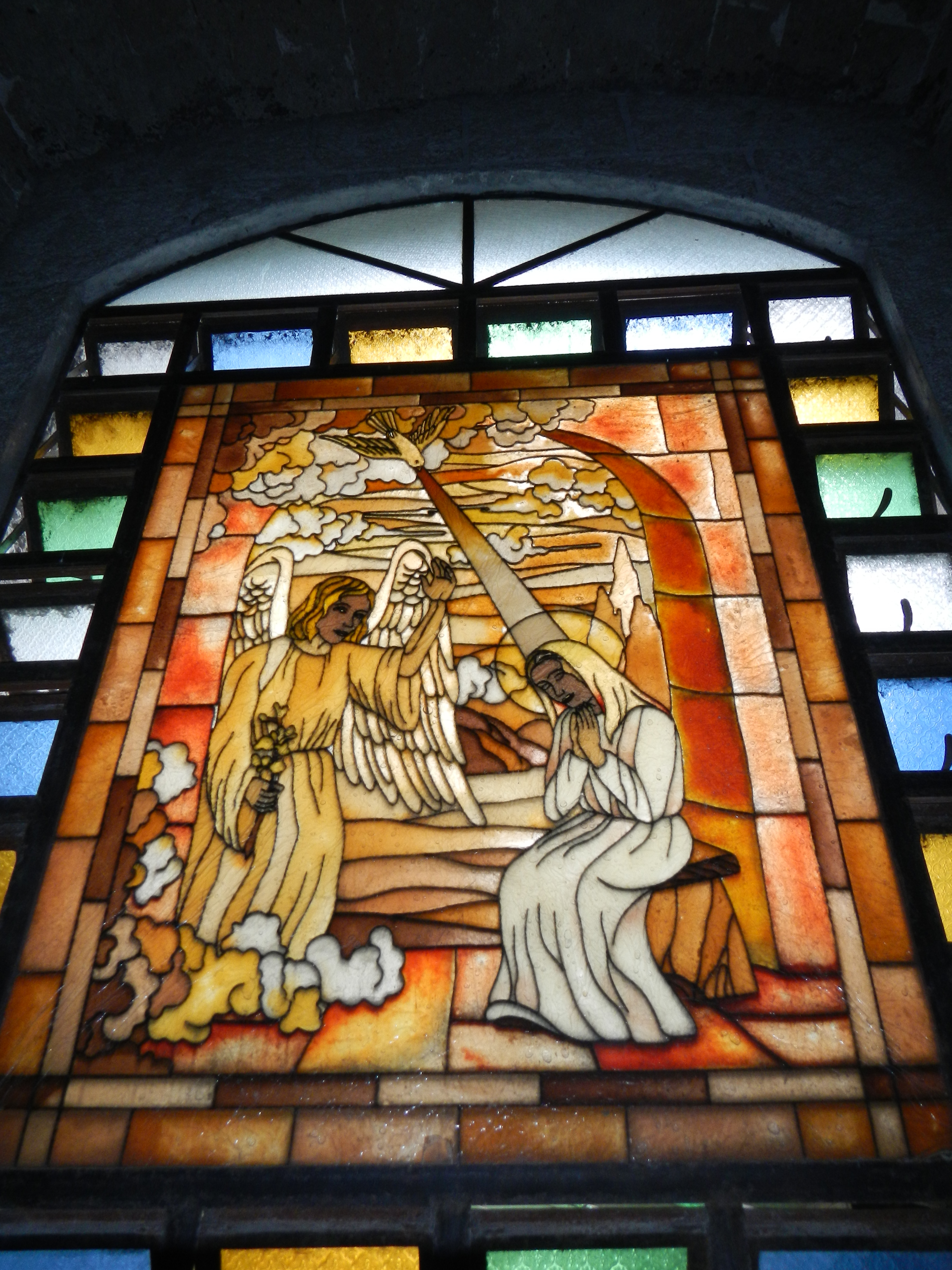
Stained glass window of the church

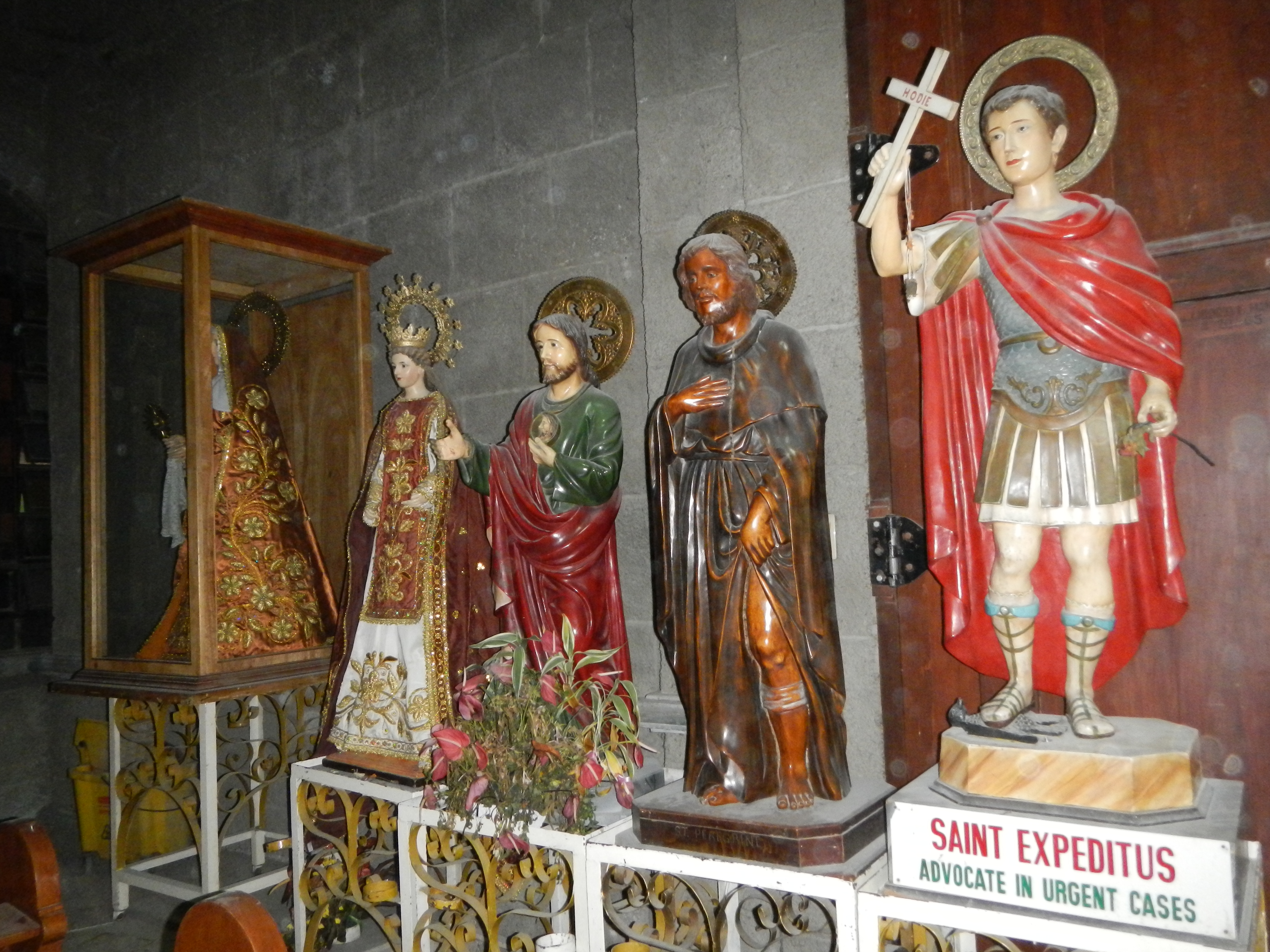
Other religious relics of the church

Pedro Mollar succeeded Diaz. He was born in Huesca, Spain, on April 5, 1838, and was assigned as missionary to various parts of the Philippines before he became the parish priest of Perez-Dasmariñas. He died in 1886 while he was at Suez Canal on his way back to Spain.

Candido Puerta of Villanueva de la Torre, Guadalajara, Spain came to the town without parish assignment but just to learn the Tagalog language. However, he later became the parish priest from 1887 to 1894. Toribio Mateo of Corella, Navarre, Spain. He was born on April 16, 1846. He too was assigned in various missions before and after his assignment in Perez-Dasmariñas. He had two separate terms as parish priest. He was the parish priest during the outbreak of the revolution and was killed by the revolutionaries in September 1896. With his death, Perez-Dasmariñas lost its resident parish priest. Victor Oscoz, the parish priest of Imus simultaneously administered the parish of the town. After the Philippine revolution, the parish was given to the Filipino secular clergy.

=== Spanish Revolution ===
During the Philippine Revolution, gobernadorcillo Don Placido Campos and his secretary Francisco Barzaga led the uprising against the Spaniards which eventually freed their town in 1896. The Spaniards tried to recapture Perez Dasmariñas from the revolutionaries. On February 25, 1897, Filipino revolutionaries took refuge in the convent that was later set on fire by the Spaniards. These men were shot as they emerged from the church. Others had shut themselves up in the church. With the church surrounded, the mountain artillery was brought out into position and from a distance of 35 metres (115 ft), the strong doors of the church were bombarded and the troops went in through the breach. Many died in the sanctuary. The event was known as the Battle of Perez Dasmariñas. During the battle, the Spaniards burned all structures in the town proper except the Catholic Church which was later used as a garrison.

=== Japanese Occupation ===
On December 17, 1944, following a similar incident in the nearby town of Imus the previous day, Japanese forces detained 15 guerilla members and 8 civilians in Dasmariñas who were suspected of being members of the guerrilla units under Col. Estanislao M. Carungcong of the 4th Infantry Regiment, Fil‑American Cavite Guerrilla Forces (FACGF). The Immaculate Conception Parish Church was converted into a temporary garrison, and the town underwent a zonification operation conducted by the Kempeitai, the Japanese military police, with assistance from local Sakdalista and Makapili collaborators.

During this operation, fifteen identified guerrilla members were tortured and executed, and their remains were interred in a mass grave. The event formed part of a broader pattern of Japanese counter‑insurgency actions in Cavite during the occupation, aimed at suppressing guerrilla activity throughout the province
