= Tim Tayag =

- Born: Timothy Tayag; November 15, 1973 (age 51)
- Occupation(s): Comedian, writer, travel show host
- Years active: 2000–present
- Website: www.timtayag.com

Timothy Tayag (born November 15, 1973) is a Filipino and American comedian, writer, director, travel show producer and host and TV personality.

== Career ==
Tayag is pioneer of point of view standup comedy in the Philippines. He has been performing his brand of humor to audiences from all over the world except in Germany, where they frown upon Nazi jokes.

Tayag first performed comedy career in 1997, in San Francisco, California to an audience of 4 people, including the homeless bum he paid to keep the audience real. He quickly got work in prestigious clubs such as the Punch Line and Cobb's after helping the waitstaff move furniture at closing. After the dot-com bubble burst in 2002, Tim sold his belongings and packed his bags to explore the world on his unemployment checks from Uncle Sam. Inspired by his travel adventures, which are documented in his quirky international television program On-Foot (which airs on the Living Asia Channel), Tim's material covers his experiences from growing up in the Philippines, living in the States, and the absurd things he finds every day. Aside from performing standup comedy, Tim writes for travel and lifestyle magazines, and hosts television shows and corporate events. Tim was the official comedian of the 2006 Asian Games in Doha, Qatar but was not an athlete despite his prowess in "dama", the barber's version of chess.

== Performances ==
Tayag performed in: Punch Line Comedy Club (San Francisco and Sacramento), Cobbïs Comedy Club (San Francisco), Rooster T Featherïs (SunnyVale), San Francisco State University, University of California, Cultural Center of the Philippines, Music Museum (Greenhills, Philippines), Comfort Room Comedy Bar (Makati, Philippines), University of the Philippines, Ateneo de Manila, ABS CBN (Quezon City), Dish (Quezon City, Philippines), BMW Autohaus (Libis, Philippines), Casino Filipino, Waterfront Hotel (Cebu, Philippines), The TakeOut Comedy Club Hong Kong (Hong Kong, China).

== Personal life ==
Tayag just got married in December 2008 to a long-time girlfriend.
