= Marcela Marcelo =

Filipina revolutionary

- Born: 1869; Malibay, Manila, Captaincy General of the Philippines
- Died: 21 March 1897 (aged 27–28); Perez-Dasmariñas, Cavite, Captaincy General of the Philippines
- Cause of death: Killed in action
- Organization: Katipunan
- Movement: Philippine Revolution
- Spouse: Quirico Lugo

Marcela Marcelo (1869 – March 21, 1897) was a Filipina general who fought during the Philippine Revolution against Spanish colonial rule. She was dubbed as Selang Bagsik (Fierce Sela) for her bravery.

== Personal life ==
Marcela was born in 1869 in the town of Malibay, which is now part of the present-day Pasay. She belonged to an upper-class family that owns an areca nut farm. She married Quirico Lugo, a man from Aguho, Pateros, and bore him a son. As the Spanish offensive against Filipino revolutionaries escalated in the area, the people of Malibay, including Marcela, had no choice but to relocate to the Filipino controlled Cavite.

== A Woman in Revolution ==
Marcela's husband was a member of the Katipunan and was apprehended then killed by the Spanish. When Marcela's husband was being taken away by the Spanish Guardia Civil, she quietly watched, without wailing nor protesting. Right after Quirico's capture, she entrusted her son to her sister and sought for revolutionaries to attack the Spaniards on their trenches. Marcela had been an active member of the Katipunan and was promoted to the rank of general, leading her own platoon through skirmishes. It was rare and unexpected for a woman, but as opponents saw her fight, she was hailed as Selang Bagsik.

Marcela gathered and trained young members of the Katipunan ranging from 14 to 18 years old. She also managed and organized the nursing of wounded Katipunan members in Bulacan.

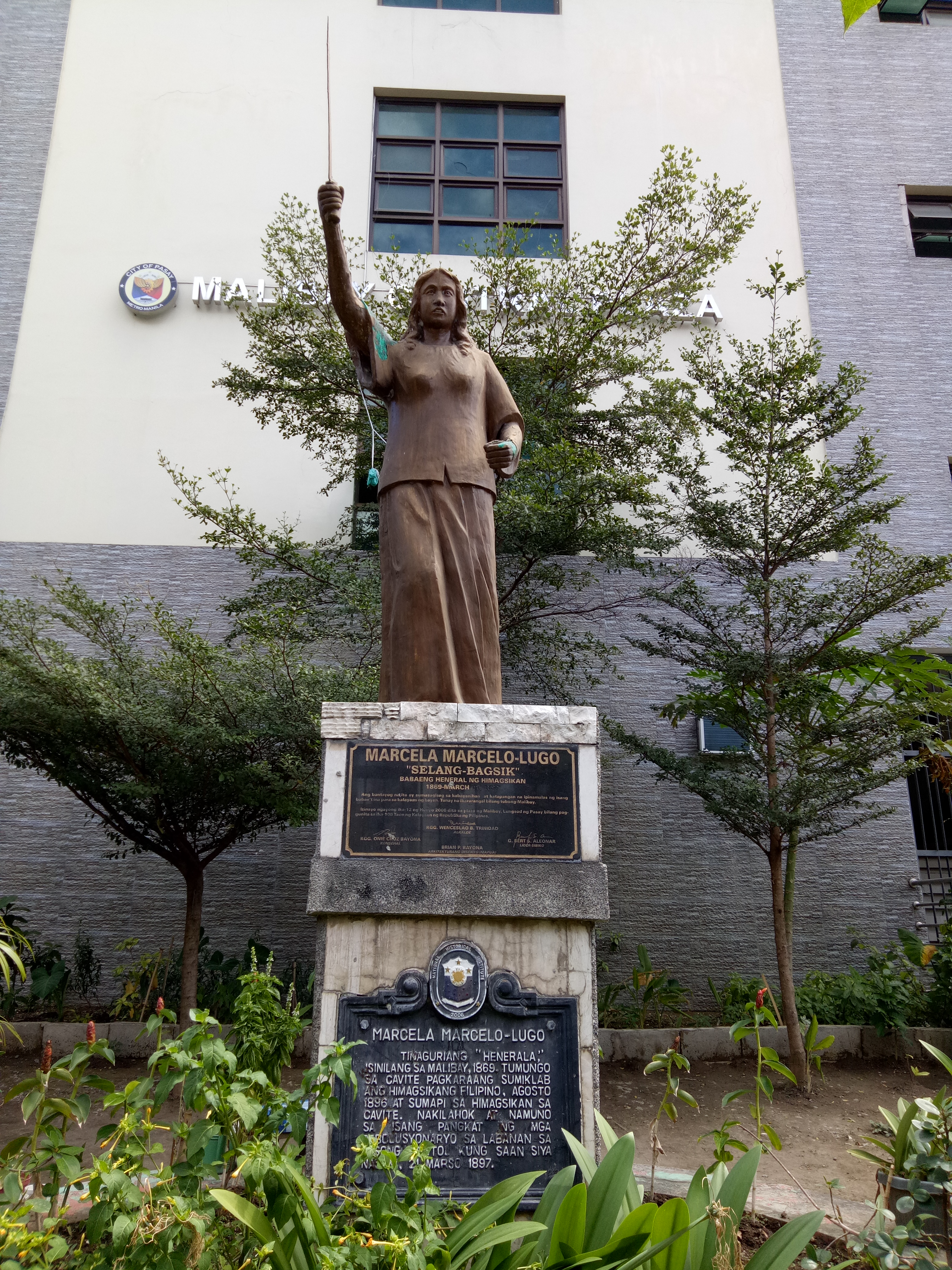
Marcela Marcelo–Lugo monument in Malibay, Pasay

== Death ==
In 1897, Marcela died at the Battle of Pasong Santol in Perez-Dasmariñas. She led a troop to rush towards the center of the Spanish army, but the Spaniards were able to shoot Marcela in the head.

Former president Emilio Aguinaldo's private secretary, Carlos V. Ronquillo, described Marcela as:

One of our platoons was led by a woman of great courage: a middle-aged married woman who had a child, a woman from Pasay (if we were not mistaken), who was always in the heat of the battle, with no weapons but a bolo. She died a heroine when the Spanish trenches were taken in Pasong Santol. This action so frightened the Spaniards that they ran and was driven by the infantry and Tagalog volunteers...

— Carlos V. Ronquillo, Some Minutes of the Revolution of 1896 – 1897

== Memorials ==
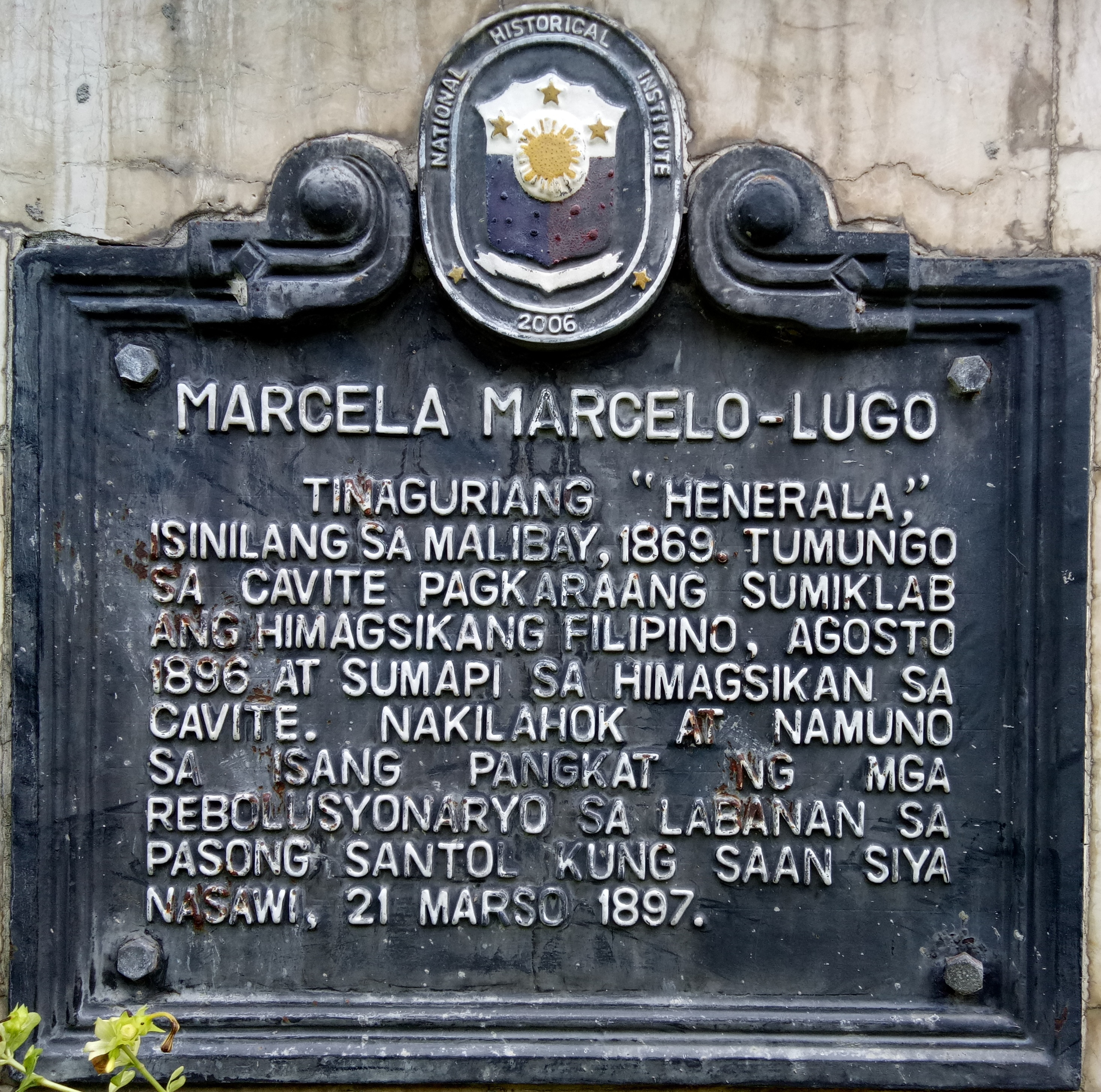
Marcela Marcelo–Lugo historical marker in Malibay, Pasay

A bust of Marcela was built in the plaza of Malibay, Pasay, in memory of her. It is situated in front of the principal road, C. Jose Street.

A school is also named after Marcela: Marcela Marcelo Elementary School, which is also located in Malibay.
