= Katipunan (TV series) =

2013 Philippine television drama series

- Title card
- Also known as: The Aggregation
- Genre: Historical drama
- Created by: Jaileen Jimeno
- Written by: Ian Victoriano
- Directed by: King Mark Baco
- Starring: Sid Lucero
- Country of origin: Philippines
- Original languages: Tagalog; Spanish
- No. of episodes: 10

Production
- Executive producer: Jayson Bernard Santos
- Cinematography: Rommel Sales; Marvin Reyes
- Camera setup: Multiple-camera setup
- Running time: 35–41 minutes
- Production company: GMA News and Public Affairs

Original release
- Network: GMA Network
- Release: October 19 – December 28, 2013

Katipunan (transl. assembly) is a 2013 historical Philippine television drama series broadcast by GMA Network. The series is based on the history of the Philippine society Katipunan. Directed by King Mark Baco, it stars Sid Lucero. It premiered on October 19, 2013. The series concluded on December 28, 2013, with a total of 10 episodes.

The series is streaming online on YouTube.

== Cast and characters ==
Cast

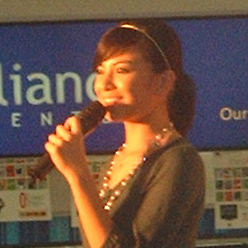
Glaiza de Castro

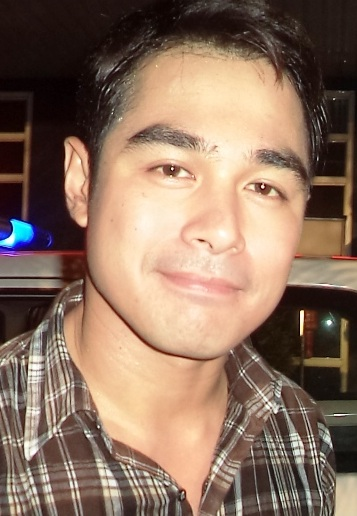
Benjamin Alves

Lead cast

- Sid Lucero as Andres Bonifacio

Supporting cast

- Glaiza de Castro as Gregoria de Jesus
- Roi Vinzon as Villalon
- Benjamin Alves as Sebastian
- Dominic Roco as Pacquing
- Nico Antonio as Emilio Aguinaldo

Guest cast

- Jill Palencia as Juanita
- Mercedes Cabral as Teresa Magbanua
- Nasser as Jose Rizal
- Christian Villete as Crispulo Aguinaldo
- Gexter Abad as Baldomero Aguinaldo
- RJ Agustin as Emilio Jacinto
- Jerald Napoles as Macario Sakay
- Earle Figuracion as Daniel Tirona
- Raffy Atar as Troadio Bonifacio
- Alchris Galura as Procopio Bonifacio
- John Prinz Strachan as Deodato Arellano
- Bernard Carritero as Deogratias Fojas
- VJ Mendoza as Aurelio Tolentino
- Jack Love Pacis as Mariano Álvarez
- Allen Edzfar as Santiago Alvarez
- Giovanni Baldesseri as Figueroa
- Justin Candado II as Artemio Ricarte
- Raul Morit as Nicolas de Jesus
- Yuwin Cruz as Pío Valenzuela
- John Relucio as Sancho Valenzuela
- Lourdes Serrano as Trinidad Fojas
- Celeste dela Cruz as Trinidad Rizal
- Vic Romano as Tata Pinong
- Angelita Loresco as Tandang Sora
- Edgar Ebro as Raymundo Mata
- Gio Emprese as Tagausig
- Juan Rodrigo as older Sebastian

== Episodes ==
A primer episode, Anak ng Bayan: The Katipunan Primer (transl. Offspring of town: the assembly primer) aired on October 12, 2013.

Katipunan episodes
No.	Title	Original release date
1	"Unang Kabanata: Teresa" (transl. first chapter: Teresa)	October 19, 2013
2	"Ikalawang Kabanata: Sebastian at Pacquing" (transl. second chapter: Sebastian and Pacquing)	November 2, 2013
3	"Ikatlong Kabanata: Oriang" (transl. third chapter: Oriang)	November 9, 2013
4	"Ika-apat na Kabanata: Trahedya at Pagtataksil" (transl. fourth chapter: tragedy and betrayal)	November 16, 2013
5	"Ika-limang Kabanata: Haring Bayan" (transl. fifth chapter: king municipality)	November 23, 2013
6	"Ika-anim na Kabanata: Karsel" (transl. sixth chapter: cellblock)	November 30, 2013
7	"Ika-pitong Kabanata: Tejeros" (transl. seventh chapter: Tejeros)	December 7, 2013
8	"Ika-walong Kabanata: Ang Paglilitis" (transl. eighth chapter: the proceeding)	December 14, 2013
9	"Ika-siyam na Kabanata: Ang Simula" (transl. ninth chapter: The beginning)	December 21, 2013
10	"Ika-sampung Kabanata: Hatol at Kamatayan" (transl. tenth chapter: verdict and death)	December 28, 2013

== Ratings ==
According to AGB Nielsen Philippines' Mega Manila household television ratings, the pilot episode of Katipunan earned a 13.7% rating. The final episode scored a 13.4% rating.

== Accolades ==
Accolades received by Katipunan
Year	Award	Category	Recipient	Result	Ref.
2014	Asia Image Apollo Awards	Best Cinematography - Long Form	"Teresa"	Won	
2014	Asia Image Apollo Awards	Best Cinematography - Long Form	"The Trial"	Nominated	
2014	Asia Image Apollo Awards	Sound Design - Long Form	"Teresa"	Nominated	
2015	New York Festivals	Best Camerawork	"Teresa"	Finalist	
