= Aurelio Tolentino =

Filipino playwright (1869–1915)

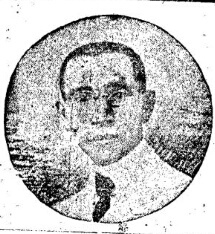
- Aurelio Tolentino depicted in a 1915 publication of "Ang Buhok ni Ester"
- Born: Aurelio Tolentino y Valenzuela; October 15, 1869; Guagua, Pampanga, Captaincy General of the Philippines
- Died: July 5, 1915 (aged 45); Manila, Philippine Islands
- Occupations: Poet, journalist and playwright
- Spouse: Natividad Hilario

Aurelio Tolentino y Valenzuela (October 15, 1869 – July 5, 1915) was a Filipino playwright, poet, journalist, and revolutionary. His works at the turn of the 20th century depicted his desire for Philippine independence from its colonizers. He was arrested on several occasions between 1896 and 1907, by the Spaniards and later by American authorities. He wrote and directed the anti-imperialist play Kahapon, Ngayon at Bukas (Spanish: Ayer, Hoy, y Mañana; English: Yesterday, Today and Tomorrow), which led to his arrest in 1903.

== Early life and career ==
Tolentino was born in Santo Cristo, Guagua, Pampanga, he was the third and youngest child of Leonardo Tolentino and Patrona Valenzuela. Tolentino, in his autobiography, described his life as "poor and unhappy". He received his Bachelor of Arts degree from Colegio de San Juan de Letran, and read law at the University of Santo Tomas. He stopped his education after his father's death.

Later in his life, Aurelio Tolentino moved to Tondo, Manila, where he became a court desk official in 1896.

=== Confusion on his birth date ===
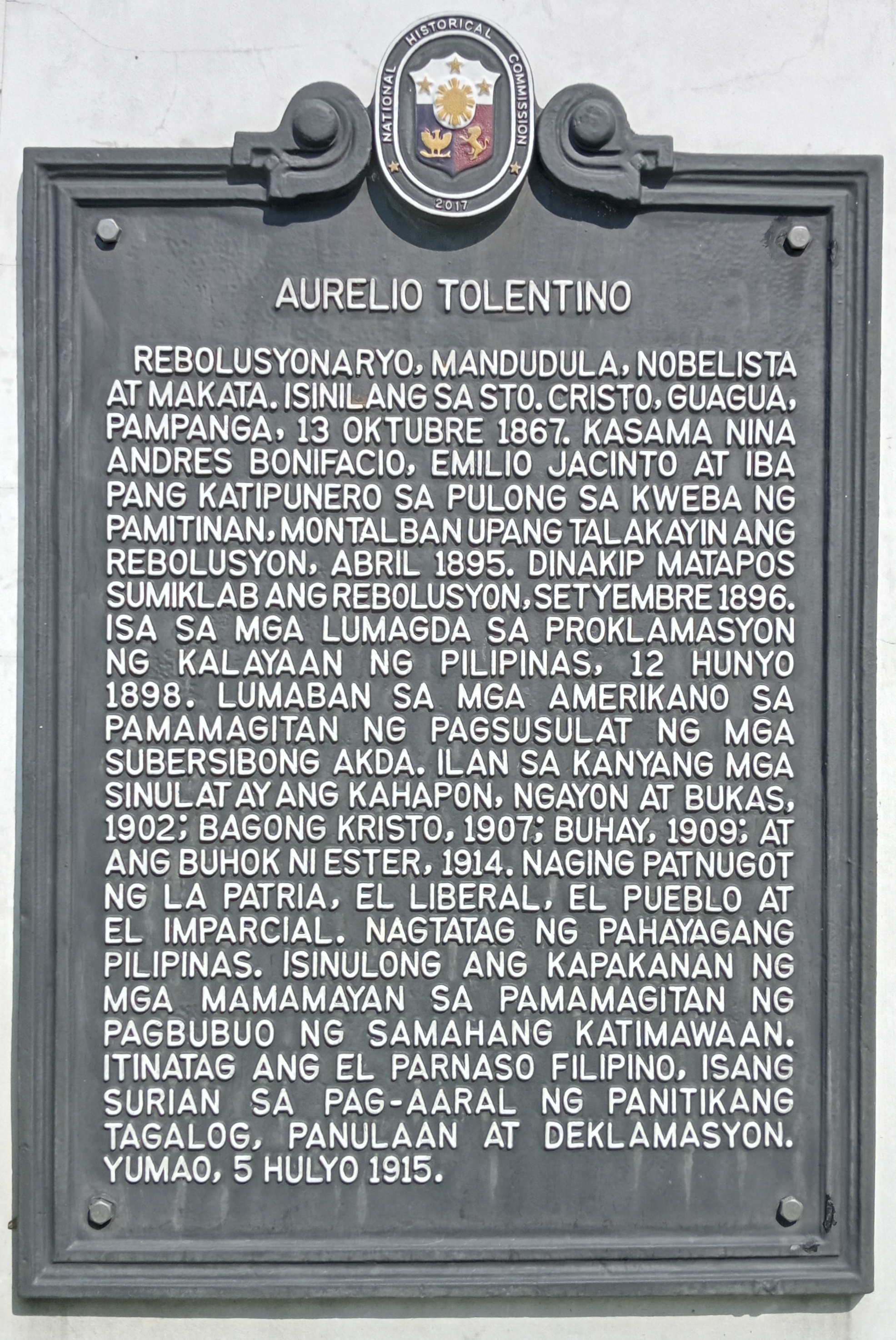
Historical marker installed in 2017 in front of the Guagua Municipal Hall

Much has been written about Aurelio Tolentino, but the exact date of his birth is unclear. Written literature of him in the early 1980s state October 15, 1875, while literature during the 1970s suggest October 13, 1867. The National Historical Commission used the 1970s birth date during his 150th birthday in 2017 at Guagua. Historian Ambeth Ocampo claimed Tolentino was born on October 15, 1869, citing an unpublished autobiography in 1908, and died in July 1915.

== Later career ==
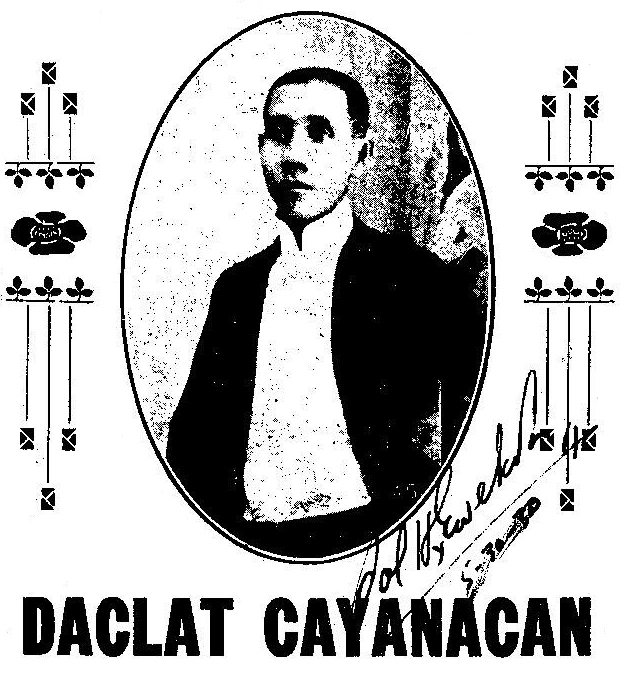
Tolentino depicted in a 1921 publication of his work written in the Kapampangan language, Daclat Cayanacan

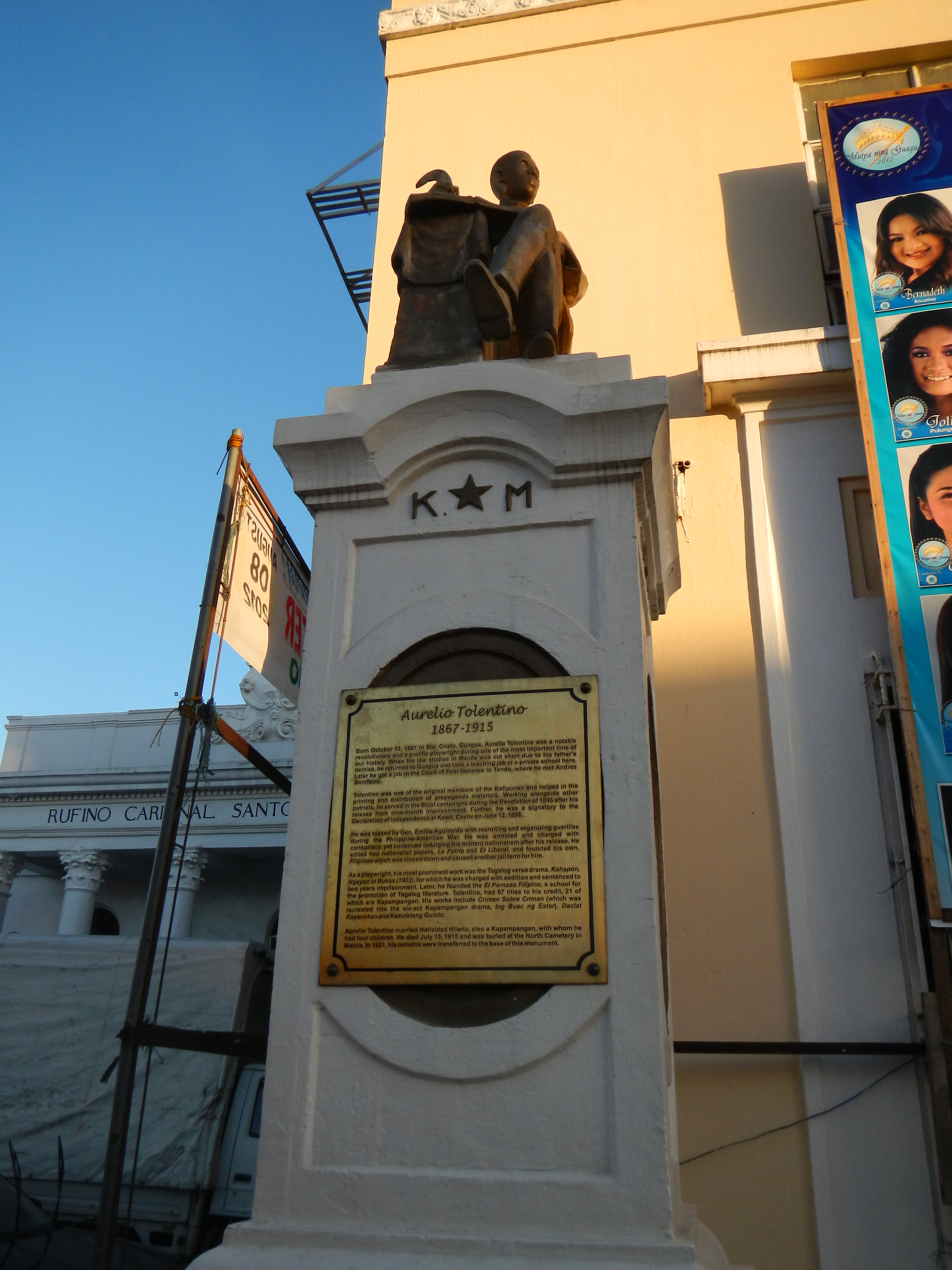
Monument of Aurelio Tolentino (1869-1915) at the Guagua, Pampanga Town hall in 2017.

=== Philippine Revolution ===
In Tondo, he met Andres Bonifacio, one of the founders of Katipunan and eventual leader of the Philippine revolution against Spain. Tolentino would eventually become an early member of the Katipunan. He accompanied Bonifacio in their search for a secret headquarters in the mountains of Morong province (now Rizal) in preparation for the start of the Philippine Revolution.

Tolentino was arrested shortly after the start of the war and was detained for nine months. He took part in the revolutionary campaigns of Gen. Vicente Lukban after his release. He continued to support the cause for Philippine sovereignty and became one of the signatories of the Declaration of Independence in Kawit, Cavite, in 1898.

=== Arrests during American rule ===
When Spain ceded the Philippines to the United States, Tolentino formed Junta de Amigos, a secret organization composed of former Katipuneros to fight for independence from the Americans. Later, he attempted to reorganize the Revolutionary Army but was unsuccessful, in part due to the surrender of Emilio Aguinaldo. This led Tolentino to shift his focus from warfare to propaganda. He edited several anti-US newspapers in Tagalog and Kapampangan, some of which were closed down by the American authorities.

According to Tolentino's unpublished handwritten autobiography in 1908, he was arrested on May 14, 1903 after his presentation of a three act drama Ayer, Hoy, y Mañana (translated to Tagalog as Kahapon, Ngayon, at Bukas) at Manila's Teatro Libertad. He was bailed out of prison in December 1903 at the cost of 7,000 pesos. Other scholarly literature claimed that Tolentino was sentenced to life imprisonment and was subsequently shortened by Governor-General William Cameron Forbes.

I was processed in the Office of the Chief of Police [of Manila], conducted to Bilibid prison, and much later sentenced to two years of hard labor, and a fine of 2,000 dollars for the crime of sedition. I appealed this sentence and in December of the same year 1903 I was released on bail of 7,000 pesos.

— Aurelio Tolentino (1908)

Later, he made connections with some Filipino insurgents and attempted to create a dictatorial revolutionary government where he was elected head. He was later arrested again in June 1904, sentenced to six years in prison, fined over US$5,000 and subjected to hard labor, and released on parole on February 5, 1907. However, he was required to report his activities to American authorities for the next five years.

On February 8, 1904, I knew I was to be arrested again because I was implicated with Artemio Ricarte who arrived from Hong Kong. I was subjected to water cure, I walked in the forests searching for Ricarte and other insurgent chiefs and we formed a new Revolutionary Dictatorial Government. Being unanimously elected Dictator in this Government, I addressed various communications to the Insular Government, calling for certain reforms in its administration, offered definitive peace in the whole Archipelago, and promised to mediate legal guarantees for all the chiefs, officials, soldiers and armed forces of the Revolution. On June 14, 1904, during these negotiations, I was captured...

— Aurelio Tolentino (1908)

Reflecting on the arrests made against him, he wrote: "I was convinced that it was impossible to live the life of a journalist."

=== Later years ===
After his release, he continued to write for the theater. Among his later works is Ang Bagong Cristo, a proletarian interpretation of the story of Christ. Some of his Kapampangan works were later translated to Tagalog, thereby reaching a wider audience. Kapampangan works include novels Ing Buac Nang Ester, published in three parts from 1911 to 1915, later translated to Tagalog as Ang Buhok ni Ester. His novel Buhay (1909), which was previously titled as Mutya, was originally written in Kapampangan.

Tolentino had been assumed to have been married somewhere between 1907 and 1908. He was married to Natividad Hilario and had four children.

Tolentino also founded the first worker's cooperative in the Philippines, Samahang Hanapbuhay ng Mahihirap, as well as El Parnaso Filipino, a school for the promotion of Tagalog literature.

==== Financial difficulties ====
After his first imprisonment in 1896, Tolentino had been suffering financially and made it even more complicated by his arrests in 1903 and 1904. His financial suffering is reflected on his novels. In his work Maring (1913), Maring only received a meager wage as a housemaid from his American employer while in Ang Buhok ni Ester, Gerardo, as an estate administrator, only received a hundred-peso monthly salary which the character considered as generous from his uncle-employer.

To ease his financial burden, he ventured into a printing press business. He named it as Limbagang Noli, named after Jose Rizal's Noli Me Tangere.

== Death ==
Tolentino died on July 5, 1915, in Manila. He was buried in the Manila North Cemetery. His remains were transferred to his hometown in Guagua in 1921, where it is interred under a commemorative monument.

In 1973, Tolentino's heirs donated volumes of his works to the University of the Philippines Library. A book about his life was published two years later, but full access of his novels were still unavailable. Project Gutenberg digitized some works, making two novels available since 2013.

== In popular culture ==
- The Little Theater of the Cultural Center of the Philippines is named after Aurelio Tolentino.
- Tolentino was portrayed by Francis Magalona in the 1997 TV series, of ABS-CBN's Bayani
- Tolentino was portrayed by VJ Mendoza in the 2013 TV series, Katipunan.
- Tolentino's life was the subject of the 2017 rock opera Aurelio Sedisyoso, staged by Tanghalang Pilipino at the Cultural Center of the Philippines.
