= Críspulo Aguinaldo =

Filipino general and revolutionary

- Born: June 10, 1863; Cavite El Viejo, Captaincy General of the Philippines
- Died: March 24, 1897 (aged 32); Imus, Cavite, Captaincy General of the Philippines
- Military career
- Allegiance: Katipunan (Magdalo)
- Service years: 1896–1897
- Rank: Lieutenant General
- Conflicts: Philippine Revolution: Battle of Binakayan–Dalahican; Battle of Perez Dasmariñas

Críspulo Aguinaldo y Famy (June 10, 1864 – March 24, 1897) was a native of Kawit, Cavite the older brother of Emilio Aguinaldo and lieutenant general who heroically defended in the Battle of Pasong Santol.

== Early life ==
Críspulo, was the son of Kapitan Carlos Aguinaldo and Trinidad Famy. He had five brothers namely (Primo, Benigno, Esteban, Ambrosio, and Emilio) and two sisters (Tomasa and Felicidad). He was known as 'Pulong' by his family members, he finished his early studies in his hometown and took up a Bachelor of Arts degree at Colegio de San Juan de Letran. He was married to Irenea Arazaso of Kawit, and had one child named Crispulo. He was a freemason and a Capitan Municipal of Kawit, Cavite before the revolution.

== Revolutionary ==
He joined the Katipunan, and his troops participated in the Battle of Binakayan on November 11, 1896. They were assigned at the rear position together with his cousin Baldomero Aguinaldo. They had defeated the Spanish forces headed by Governor General Ramon Blanco and Colonel Marina. He was also responsible in the insurgents in attacking the Spanish forces in Muntinlupa, Taguig and Pateros in Rizal Province. In February 1897, he joined his brother, Emilio, who was defending the town of Dasmariñas, Cavite, from the troops of General Lachambre of the division of Captain-General Camilo Polavieja. The Spaniards were victorious in this battle, after which the Filipino forces evacuated the town after days of fighting. General Lachambre and General Antonio Zabala who was the commander of the Spanish forces in Dasmariñas led the attack on Salitran, it was where Gen. Zabala and Críspulo met in a hand-to-hand combat which resulted in the death of Gen. Zabala.

== Tejeros Assembly and death ==
Críspulo attended the Tejeros Assembly on March 22, 1897, in San Francisco de Malabon (now General Trias), where his brother Emilio was voted as the president of the reorganized revolutionary government. Colonel Vicente Riego de Dios was sent by the assembly to fetch General Emilio Aguinaldo who was then in Pasong Santol. The General refused to come, so Críspulo was then sent to talk to his brother. He greeted his brother and explained his purpose, but Emilio was hesitant to leave because of the pending attack of the Spanish forces in Dasmariñas and Imus. Críspulo didn't want to return to Tejeros without his brother, so he volunteered himself to stay behind in the area and promised that no Spaniard will take over Pasong Santol; that they would only take it over his dead body. On March 24, two days after Emilio left Pasong Santol, the Spaniards defeated the outnumbered Filipino defenders. Although wounded, Crispulo fought gallantly and was killed during the battle at the age of 33.

== In popular culture ==
- Portrayed by Gerard Ejercito in the 2012 film, El Presidente.
- Portrayed by Christian Villete in the 2013 TV series, Katipunan.
