= Living Asia Channel =

- Country: Philippines
- Broadcast area: Worldwide
- Headquarters: Quezon City

Programming
- Language: English
- Picture format: 720p/1080i HDTV

Ownership
- Owner: CCI Asia Group Corp.
- Sister channels: FilAm TV; MindaNow Network; Vegas Life TV

History
- Launched: June 6, 2004; 22 years ago (original); 2023; 3 years ago (relaunch)
- Closed: July 9, 2020; 6 years ago (original)

Links
- Website: www.livingasiachannel.tv

Living Asia Channel is a 24-hour Asian travel and lifestyle channel. Launched on June 6, 2004, this channel is owned by CCI Asia Group Corp. and operated by CCI Asia Television. Its head office is located in Quezon City, Philippines. In Asia, Living Asia Channel is available through the communications satellite Agila II of Mabuhay Satellite Corp. (MSC), which has a C-band footprint encompassing Bangladesh, Bhutan, Brunei, Cambodia, China, Hong Kong, India, Indonesia, Japan, Korea, Laos, Malaysia, Mongolia, Maldives, Indonesia, Myanmar, Nepal, East Timor, Singapore, Sri Lanka, Taiwan, Thailand, India, Macau, Vietnam, and Hawaii.

Living Asia Channel is seen on PCTV is available in Americas, Africa, Greater Middle East, North America, Chile, Brazil, Kenya, Europe, the Middle East, and Asia Pacific. In the Asia Pacific region, PCTV is seen in Cambodia; Guam; Hong Kong; Japan; Indonesia; Singapore; New Zealand and in Sydney, Australia.

Living Asia programs are also available 24/7 over IPTV through live video streaming on JumpTV.com and through video-on-demand through Images Asia on ABS-CBNNow! (now iWant), an ABS-CBN Interactive service.

Living Asia Channel is available in Cable Operators: SkyCable & Destiny Cable (Metro Manila) Channel 113 (Digital), Cablelink (Metro Manila) Channel 102 (Metro Manila), G Sat (Nationwide) Channel 88, Cignal TV, and other affiliate cable stations within the Philippines.

In the Philippines, Living Asia Channel is also a dual channel served for the Manila Jockey Club sports feed which is only for SkyCable, Destiny Cable and Sky Direct subscribers.

The channel temporarily ceased broadcast on July 9, 2020 due to the COVID-19 pandemic. However, the channel resumed its broadcast in 2023 following the ease of COVID-19 restrictions and coinciding with the launch of its newest sister channel, MindaNow Network. CCI Asia Group later expanded the channel into the United States through its newest streaming partner VegasPlus.

The programming block is also broadcasting via the MindaNow Network Hour programming block on IBC on free-to-air television.

== Programming ==
- Travel Guide
- Cuisine Asia
- Asian Specials
- Windows
- Celebration
- Our Asia
- Trade Asia
- Glimpses
- Gentrip
