= Battle of Perez Dasmariñas =

1897 Philippine Revolution battle

Battle of Perez Dasmariñas Cavite Counter-Offensive of 1897
- Part of the Philippine Revolution
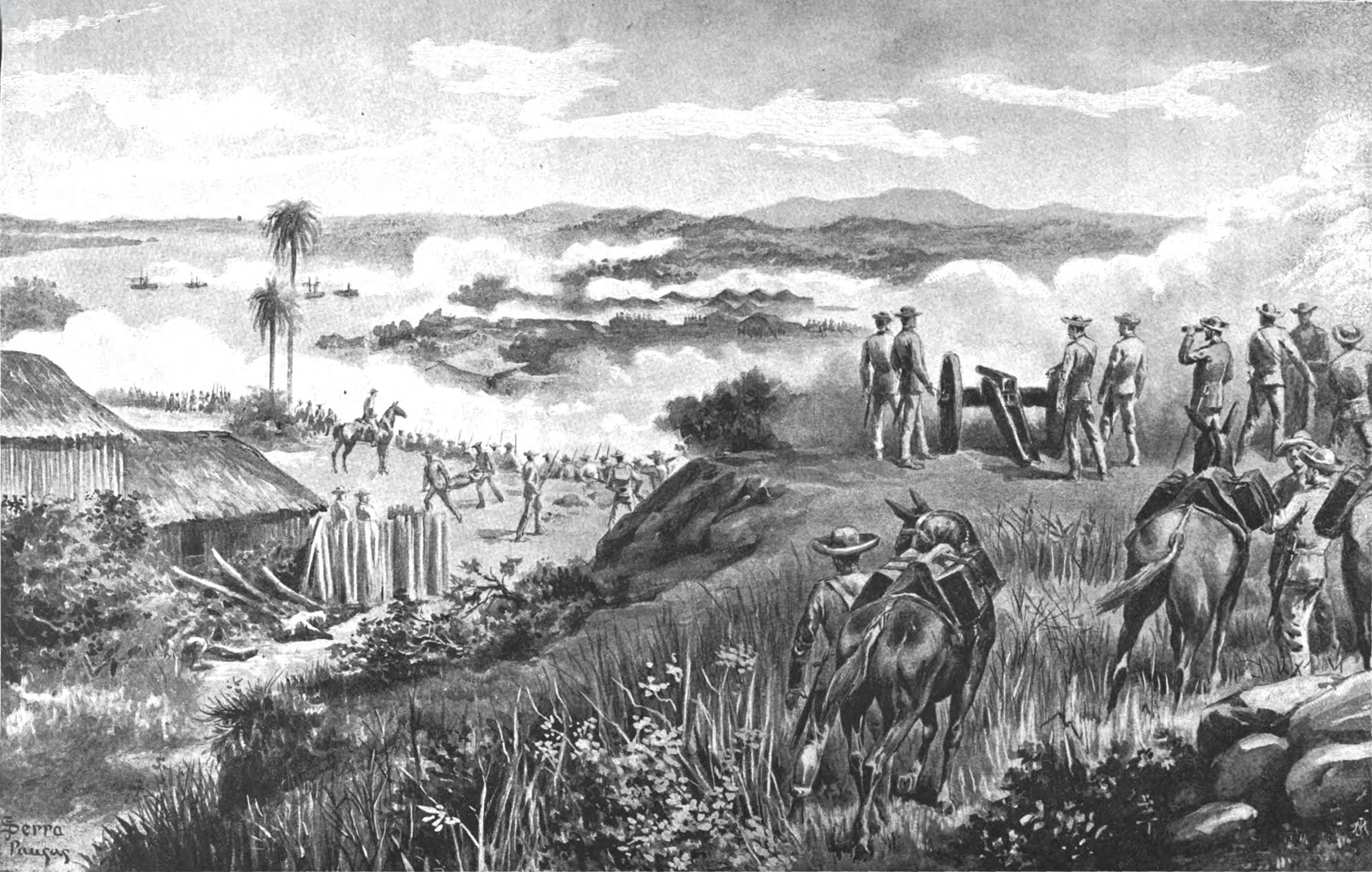
- Capture of Silang by the troops of the Lachambre division (illustration by J. Serra y Pausas, 1897)
Date	February 15 (Start of the Cavite Offensive) to March 24, 1897
Location	Perez-Dasmariñas (and nearby vicinities of the town), Cavite, Philippines
Result	Decisive Spanish victory

Belligerents
Katipunan: Magdalo	Spain

Commanders and leaders
Emilio Aguinaldo; Crispulo Aguinaldo †; Flaviano Yengko †; Placido Campos; Marcela Marcelo †	Camilo de Polavieja; Jose de Lachambre; Antonio Zabala †

Strength
60,000+ men	23,000 infanterias and cazadores 100+ guns and mortars

Casualties and losses
~10,000 (estimated)	~3,000
- 20,000 civilian deaths

The Battle of Perez Dasmariñas (Filipino: Labanan sa Perez Dasmariñas, Spanish: Batalla de Pérez Dasmariñas) was a battle of the Philippine Revolution. It occurred during the Cavite Offensive of 1897, commanded by Maj. Gen. Jose de Lachambre under Governor-General Camilo de Polavieja, as the Spanish aimed to recapture Cavite from Katipunan rebel control. Both the battle and the offensive was a success for the Spanish, and the retreat to Montalban occurred several weeks after the battle.

== Prelude ==
The offensive began on February 15 at the town of Pamplona in Cavite. The Spaniards recaptured the town of Silang with heavy losses on February 19, 1897. and the revolutionaries retreated to Perez Dasmariñas. The Spaniards aimed to retake the rebel center town of Imus and had to take the town of Perez Dasmariñas first.

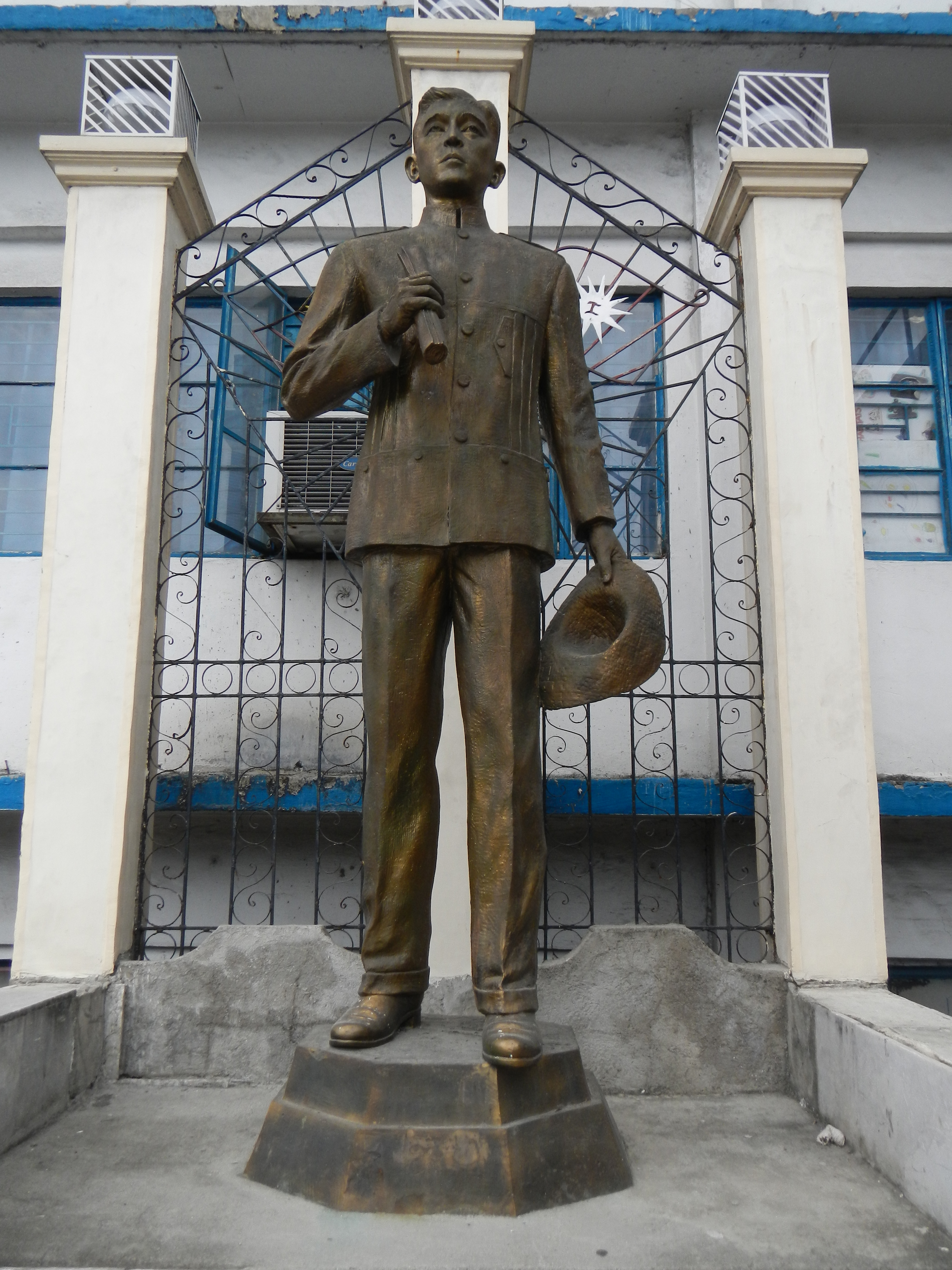
Placido Campos Y Nave

== Battle ==
On February 27, the Spaniards began their assault on Perez Dasmariñas and its vicinities. The Katipuneros intercepted the advancing Spaniards in Salitran, between Imus and Perez Dasmariñas, starting March 7. Meanwhile, at the Tejeros Convention, Aguinaldo was voted in absentia as the president of a reorganized revolutionary government on March 22. The next day, Colonel Vicente Riego de Dios was sent by the assembly to fetch Aguinaldo, who was then in Pasong Santol. The newly elected president refused to come because of the pending attack, so his brother Crispulo Aguinaldo was then sent to fetch him. Crispulo said that the Spanish would only retake the town over his dead body. Aguinaldo thus left and took his oath of office at Santa Cruz de Malabon (now Tanza) that day, Emilio realizing the danger, sent a reinforcement detachment but was intercepted on the way by Captain General Artemio Ricarte under the order of Supremo Andres Bonifacio thus leaving the Pasong Santol front weakened, Crispulo was killed the following day at Pasong Santol and the rebels were routed with heavy losses, with combat reaching the town of Perez Dasmariñas itself. Some survivors managed to get back to Imus.

== Outcome ==
The battle signaled the advent of the Spanish recapture of Cavite province until by 1898 when aguinaldo returned the town was liberated by Filipino forces and raised flag there and would hold on by Filipino forces until the Americans captured it in 1899

== See also ==
- Battle of Binakayan-Dalahican
- Ramon Blanco y Erenas
- Silang, Cavite
