= Distrito de La Infanta =

Former administrative division of the Philippines

District of Infanta Distrito de La Infanta (Spanish)
- Former district of the Philippines
- 1858–1902
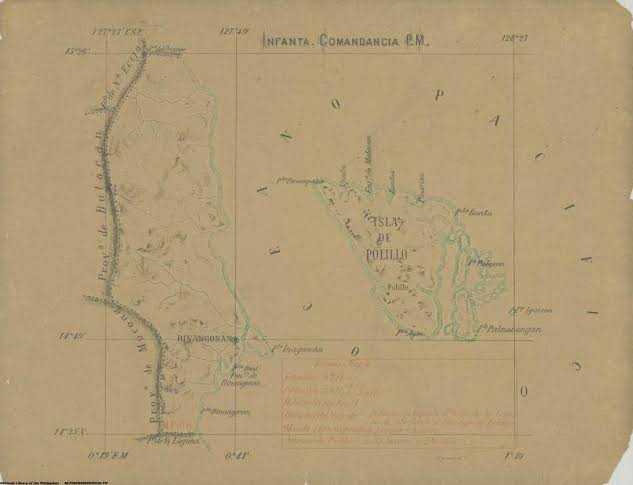
- Map of District of Infanta
- Capital: Binangonan de Lampon
- Area
- 1,900 km^{2} (730 sq mi)
- Historical era: Colonial period
  - Established: 1858
  - Disestablished: 1902
- Today part of: Province of Quezon

Distrito de La Infanta was a politico-military district established during the late Spanish colonial period in the Philippines. Created in 1858, it was situated at the eastern coast of Luzon. It covered a portion of what was known as 'contracosta'—the pueblo of Binangonan de Lampon (today collectively referred to as Metro Reina—comprising the municipalities of Real, Infanta, and General Nakar), and the islands of Polillo (now the municipalities of Polillo, Panukulan, Patnanungan, Burdeos, as well as the island municipality of Jomalig). The capital of the Distrito de La Infanta was located in Binangonan de Lampon, where the 'Politico-Militar Comandante' resided and exercised authority over the entire district. All of the area that was formerly part of Distrito de La Infanta are now part of the Province of Quezon.

== Background ==
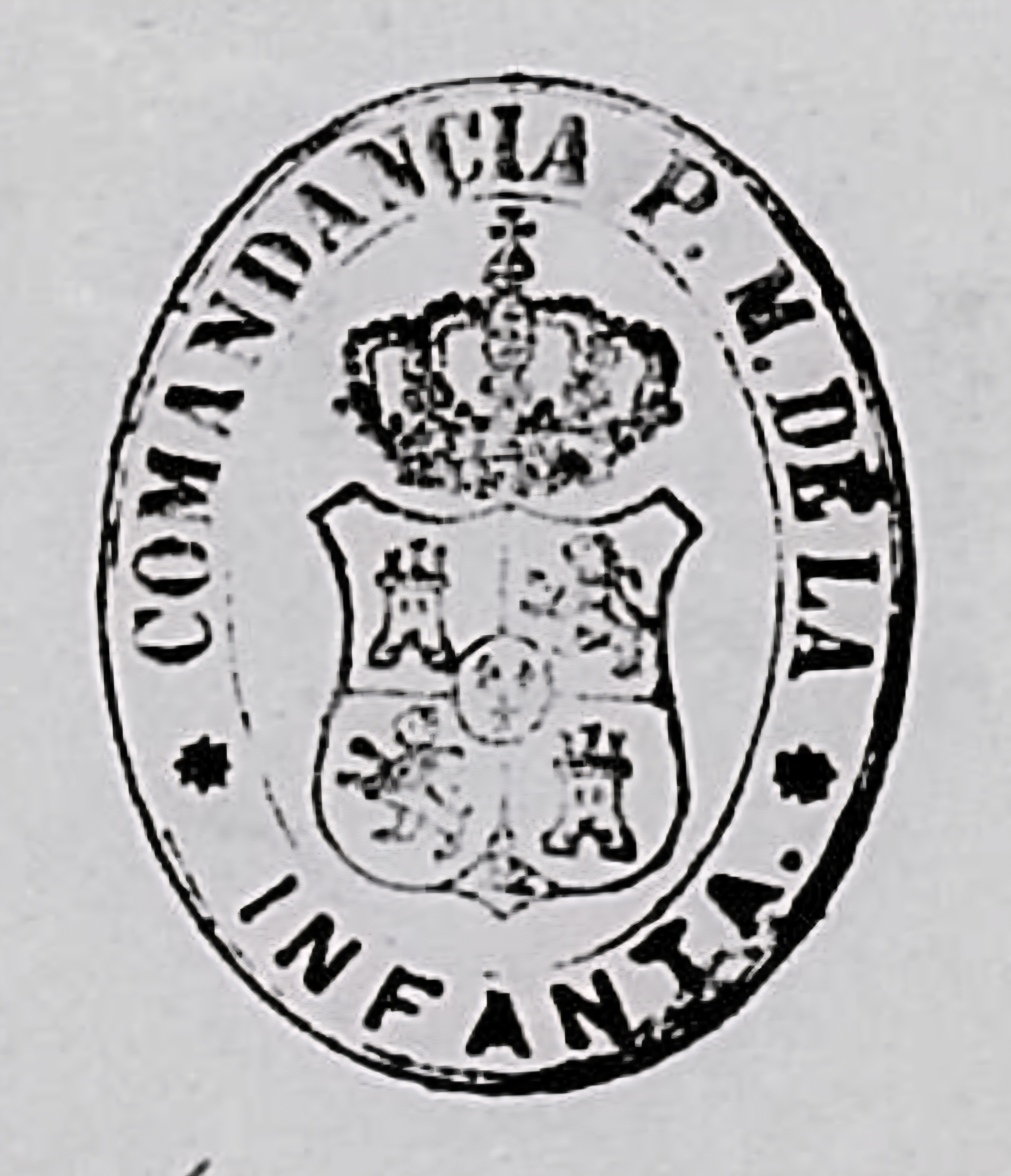
Seal

On May 23, 1855, the alcalde mayor of Nueva Ecija wrote to the Gobernador General of the Philippines, proposing the division of the towns of contracosta to their respective provinces. He cited the considerable distances of these towns from their provincial capitals, which made it difficult for government authorities to effectively administer and promote development in the area.

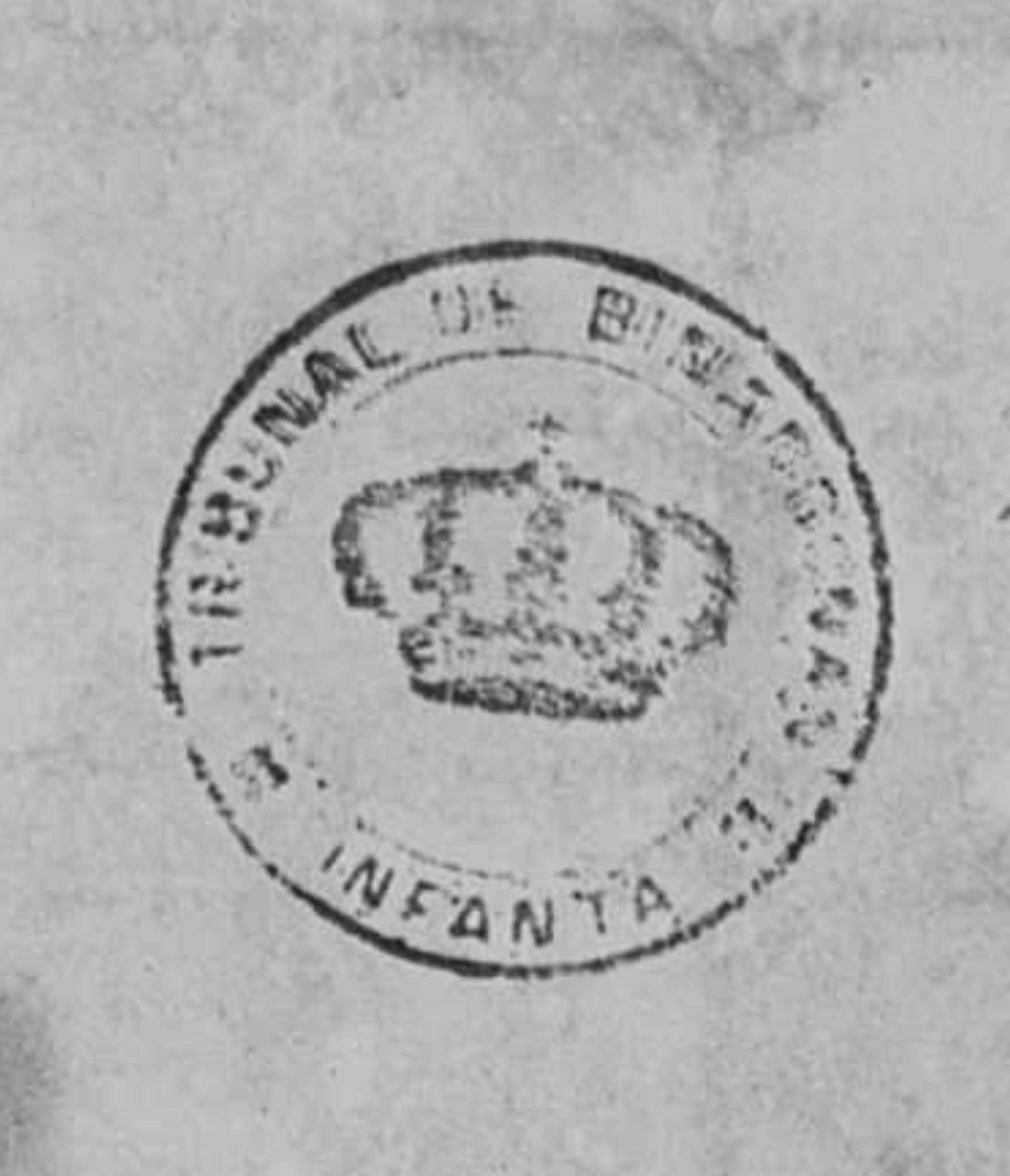
Tribunal Stamp of Infanta

Subsequently, on March 18, 1858, the Superior Government, under the direction of Governor-General Fernando de Norzagaray, issued a decree creating two military commandancies in the eastern Luzon. The first commandancy, El Príncipe, was carved out of territory that formerly belonged to Nueva Ecija. The second, La Infanta, was organized within the jurisdiction of La Laguna.

Further administrative clarification came on July 2, 1858, with an agreement proposing to grant judicial powers to the leaders of both El Príncipe and La Infanta. This agreement was officially sanctioned by a higher decree on July 23, 1858. Felix Huerta's book Estado, refers to the creation of the district as having taken place in 1856.

== Description ==
According to the Estado geográfico, topográfico, estadístico, histórico, the District of Infanta occupies an estimated area of 1,900 square kilometers, encompassing within its jurisdiction the Polillo Archipelago, consisting of twenty-six islands. Though separated from the mainland district by a distance of approximately twenty-four miles, these islands are administratively attached to it.

The district is bounded as follows: to the north, by Nueva Ecija; to the east, by the Pacific Ocean; to the south, by the province of Laguna; and to the west, by both Laguna and Bulacan.

The population, at the time of reporting, does not exceed 9,000 inhabitants. Of these, approximately 8,700 are Tagalogs, while the remainder are Dumagat Negritos, indigenous peoples who inhabit the mountainous interior regions, particularly in the environs of Binangonan de Lampon. The Banatangan mountain range, running from west to south, forms a formidable natural barrier between Infanta and its neighboring provinces. The range is characterized by steep precipices, torrential ravines, and a complete lack of developed infrastructure. As of the date of the report, there exists no road worthy of the name. The only passage is a treacherous and rugged trail traversing deep ravines and fast-flowing rivers—some over twenty fathoms deep—making communication with the town of Siniloan (Laguna) extremely difficult and perilous.

Economically, the primary agricultural product of the district is palay (rice), while its principal industry is the distillation of nipa wine. On Polillo Island, there is limited timber exploitation, along with a more significant trade in balate (sea cucumber) and beeswax, both of which are found in relative abundance.

The capital of the district is Binangonan de Lampon, located approximately three kilometers inland from the coast. Here lies Puerto Real, a port of historical significance that, during the 16th century, was highly esteemed by Spanish galleons as one of the finest harbors for trans-Pacific communication with New Spain. Binangonan de Lampon and the town of Polillo, located on the island of the same name, are the only notable settlements within this modest yet strategically situated province.

== Development ==
According to an article published in El Estado on July 12, 1859—, as well as reports from various newspapers of the time, the district capital, the town of Binangonan de Lampon, had undergone a complete transformation. What was once a disordered and forest-like settlement had been thoroughly renovated and systematically arranged to resemble a proper colonial town.

The streets, formerly irregular and overgrown, were neatly aligned, following a deliberate urban plan. Each plot of land was enclosed with elegant hedges made of mangrove wood, all constructed in uniformity according to an established model.

Significant improvements in local infrastructure were also noted. Sturdy wooden bridges had been erected to replace the former makeshift crossings made merely of coconut or palm trunks, greatly enhancing both accessibility and safety.

In the vicinity of Puerto Real de Lampon, extensive works were also carried out. These included land clearing, the systematic spacing of terrain, and the extraction of stone from nearby quarries as part of the Spanish colonial government's commitment to developing the eastern frontier of Luzon.

== List of District Politico-Militar Comandante ==
No.	Image	Comandante	Year
1		Francisco Guido y Perez	1858 - 1861
2		Rafael Ripoll y Marquesta	1861 -
3		Antonio Garcia y Ferriz	1868 - 1870
4		Carlos Gonzales Rodriguez	1870 -
5		Manuel Lopez	1875 -
6		Antonio Seco y Velarde	1877 - 1882
7		Jose Nunez y Nunez	1882 - 1884
8		Juan Sierra	1884 - 1887
9		Eduardo Lopez	1887 - 1888
10		Jose Ramirez de Alba	1888 - 1889
11		Salvador Cayuela Diaz	1890-1891
12		Jose Martinez Pedreira	1891 - 1892
13		Juan Tiscar y Croquer	1892
14		Jose del Pozo Morales	1892-1893
15		Miguel Clavito	1894
16		Pedro Miras Trias	1895
17		Rafael Luna Modelo	1896 - 1897
18		Ildefonso Parras Serradel	1897 - 1898

== Philippine Revolution ==
The Philippine Revolution, which erupted in August 1896, quickly spread beyond the central provinces of Luzon. By September 1896, signs of unrest had already reached the Distrito de La Infanta. During that month, Rafael Luna, the District Politico-Militar Comandante, issued a public announcement indicating concern over the presence of revolutionary activity in the area.

"I consider it appropriate, in accordance with the rights granted to me by the Law for the surveillance of public order in this district while the current circumstances through which we are passing, to confer broad powers and authorize the Reverend Parish Priest of Polillo, Fr. Román Prieto, to act as the delegate of my authority. Accordingly, I grant him the authority to issue whatever orders he considers necessary concerning the maintenance of public order and the peace of the community, and to proceed with the full rigor of the law against those who fail in their duties or violate the existing institutions. He is likewise authorized, whenever necessary, to conduct searches of the homes of any resident. All persons are to obey his orders as though they were issued directly by me in that locality. Likewise, should there be any resident considered suspicious, he shall cause such person to be arrested and brought before my authority. He is also empowered, in my name, to suspend from office any gobernadorcillo, justice of the peace, teniente mayor, or cabeza de barangay whom he finds failing faithfully to perform the duties of his office, sending such official under arrest to my authority.

He shall report to me in writing on all political and military matters in which he acts as my representative, so that I may inform my superiors. To make this authority known, I issue this document so that no resident, civil authority, or member of the principalia of that town may plead ignorance as an excuse for failing to obey my representative, the Reverend Parish Priest, in which case I am prepared to enforce the full rigor of the law.

Given in Binangonan de Lampón, on the twelfth of September, eighteen hundred and ninety-six.

RAFAEL LUNA. - There is a stamp to say Comandacia P. M. of La Infanta."

By mid-1898, the situation in the district had deteriorated significantly. On 28 June 1898, Spanish clergy in Binangonan de Lampon, Fr. Félix Ángel, received a warning from a schoolteacher from Anoling regarding an imminent uprising.

On 1 July 1898, the same informant discreetly delivered a written note identifying the structure of the local Katipunan organization. The note named Rafael Rutaquio (president), Rufino Ortiz (vice-president), Tomás Ramírez (treasurer), and Manuel Rutaquio. Pablo Astilla was identified as jefe del distrito (district chief) and expected to arrive in the district with approximately 100 rifles purchased through locally collected funds.

Spanish authorities attempted to respond by reinforcing the convent as a defensive position, concentrating troops, and conducting arrests.These efforts proved ineffective, as many of the identified individuals had already fled.

On 2 July 1898, the extent of local support for the revolutionaries became evident when townspeople refused to assist in the construction of fortifications around the convent. As a result, the work had to be carried out by soldiers alone.

On July 4, 1898, in the town of Polillo, Filipino revolutionaries apprehended Father Félix Pinto, a Spanish priest, along with his coadjutor, Father Anastasio Gutiérrez. Later that month, on July 20, Pinto and Gutiérrez were taken to the district capital of Binangonan de Lampon. According to the account of Fr. Félix Ángel, they were sent to the convent under orders to confer with Spanish authorities. The revolutionaries delivered a letter demanding surrender, stating that resistance was futile. Following deliberations, Spanish officers agreed to capitulate and drafted formal terms of surrender.

On 20 July 1898, Spanish forces in Binangonan de Lampon formally capitulated following negotiations with Katipunan forces. The surrender effectively transferred authority in the district to revolutionary leadership, marking the end of Spanish politico-military control in the region.

Following the surrender, Spanish clergy— Fr. Félix Ángel and Fr. Eduardo de la Torre—together with the priests from Polillo and members of the Spanish military detachment, were held in custody under revolutionary supervision.

After the surrender, the entire town served a farewell dinner to the members of the detachment. They remained at Binangonan de Lampon until August 9 before heading to Malolos.

The 20th of July 1898, signified the end of Spanish colonial rule in the Distrito de La Infanta. In recognition of this momentous occasion, the main street of Binangonan de Lampon capital (now part of Infanta, Quezon) was named "20 de Julio"—a name that remains in use to this day, serving as a lasting tribute to the dates historical significance. For over four decades, the date was commemorated annually by the local community, with celebrations continuing until 1941.

=== Revolutionaries from District of Infanta ===
Although the identities of many revolutionaries from the Distrito de la Infanta remain undocumented, several individuals associated with the revolutionary movement have been identified in surviving archival records and contemporary accounts.

Revolutionaries identified in the narrative of Fr. Félix Ángel as participants in the Philippine Revolution of 1898 include:

- Pablo Astilla, District Chief (Jefe del distrito)
- Rufino Ortiz
- Rafael Rutaquio
- Tomas Ramirez
- Manuel Rutaquio
- Isidro Meraña
- Catalino Mercado
- Lucino de la Cruz

== Revolutionary Government and First Philippine Republic ==
No.	Portrait	Political-Military Governor	Year
1		Pablo Astilla y Huertasuela	1898 - 1901

After the events of 20th July 1898, Pablo Astilla assumed leadership of the district. Infanta was later recognized as a province under the Revolutionary Government and the First Philippine Republic, as reflected in several surviving Philippine Revolutionary Government documents.

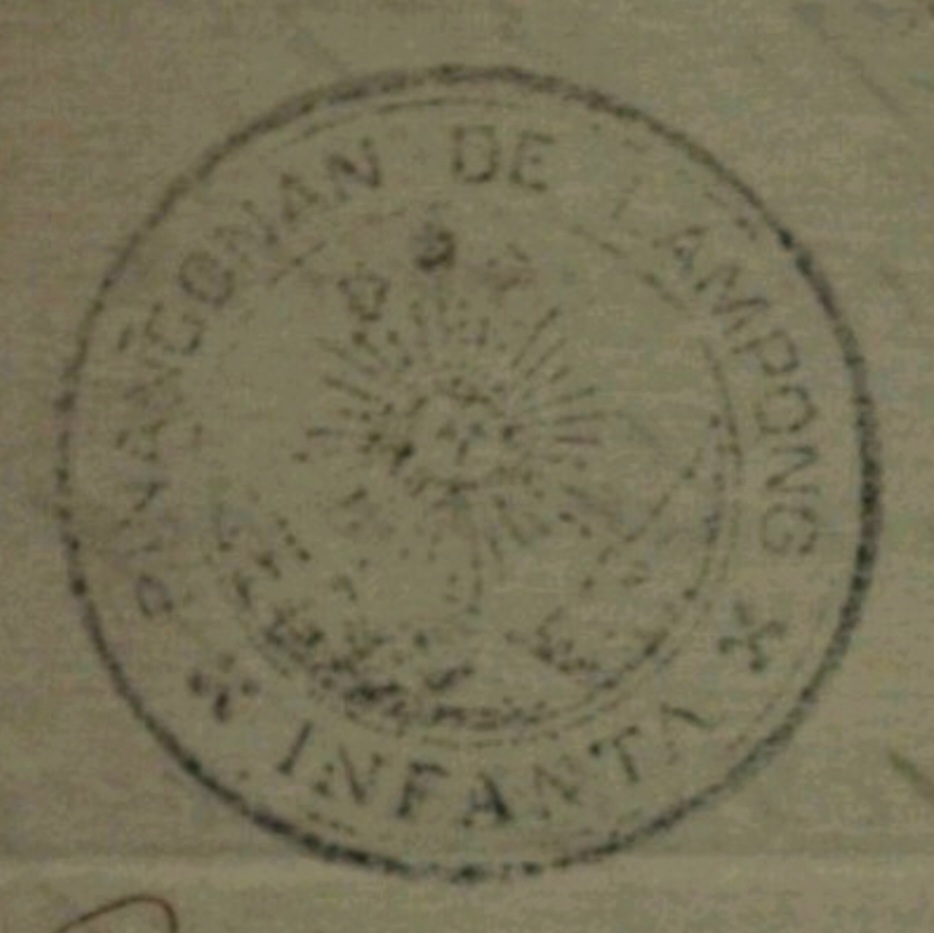

The town of Anoling was also formalized during this period, as evidenced by the existence of a municipal seal used during the revolutionary era.

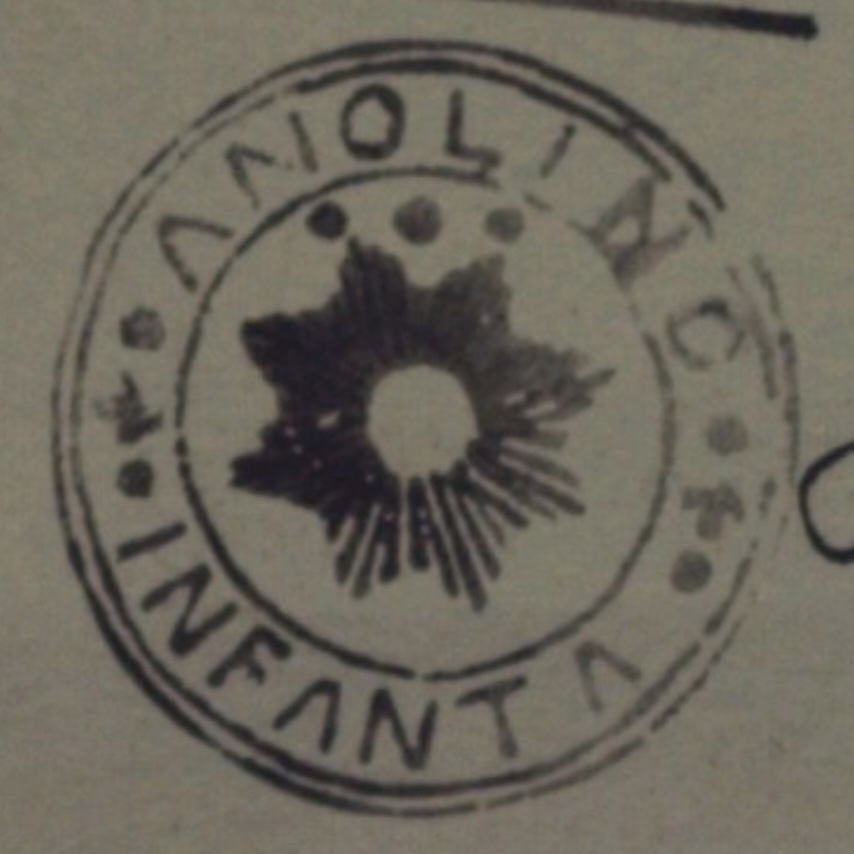

To strengthen the province’s revolutionary army, former members of regiments that had previously served under Spanish authority were recruited alongside local volunteers.

=== Philippine–American War, 1900–1901 ===
During the Philippine–American War, the provincial regiment answered the call to arms and marched to Laguna in an effort to halt the advancing American forces, taking part in the Battle of Mabitac on 14 September 1900.

Following the American setback at Mabitac, U.S. authorities organized a major expedition against the Province of Infanta. According to an official report dated 27th October 1900, the expeditionary force assembled at Siniloan consisted of “two companies of the Second U.S. Infantry; two companies of the Eighth U.S. Infantry; one battalion (four companies) of the Thirty-seventh Infantry, U.S.V.; and one troop of the squadron Philippine cavalry,” totaling 30 officers and 773 enlisted men.

The provincial capital, Binangonan de Lampon, fell to American forces on 9 October 1900, forcing the Infanta nationalists to withdraw into the mountainous interior of the province. The town of Polillo subsequently fell on 12 October 1900.

Individuals identified in Philippine Insurgent Records (P.I.R.) during the Philippine–American War

- Pablo Astilla, Colonel
- Rufino Ortiz, Major
- Mariano Portales
- Estevan Juntereal
- José Garin
- Ascárraga

== Dissolution ==
Following the end of the Philippine-American War and the establishment of American sovereignty, the new colonial administration undertook a reorganization of provincial and district boundaries.

One such change came with the passage of Act No. 417 by the United States Philippine Commission on June 11, 1902. This act formally dissolved the Politico-Military Districts of Infanta, as well as the administrative separation of the Islands of Polillo. These areas, once semi-autonomous under the Spanish colonial system—and whose status was retained during the Revolutionary Government and the First Philippine Republic—were annexed under the jurisdiction of the Province of Tayabas (now Quezon Province). The act was enacted June 12, 1902.

Subsequently, on December 16, 1902, the civil commission approved a law changing the name of the town of Binangonan de Lampon, located in the Province of Tayabas, to Infanta.

== News and Events ==
October 13, 1860: Boletín Oficial de Filipinas

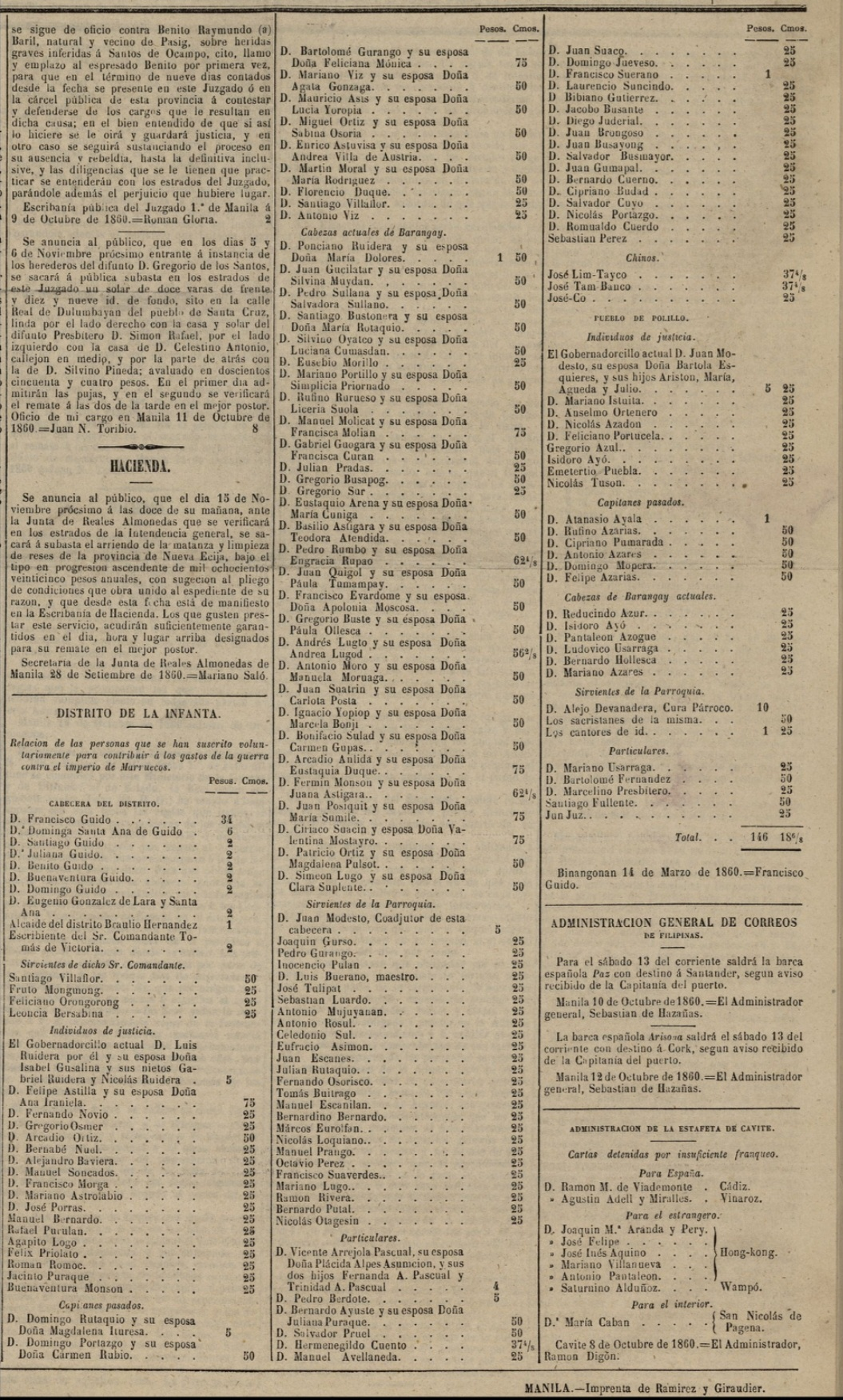
Boletín Oficial de Filipinas, October 13, 1860

A fundraising campaign was organized among the residents of Distrito de La Infanta, in support of the Spanish war effort against the Moroccan Empire.

January 10, 1870: Simon de Anda Monument

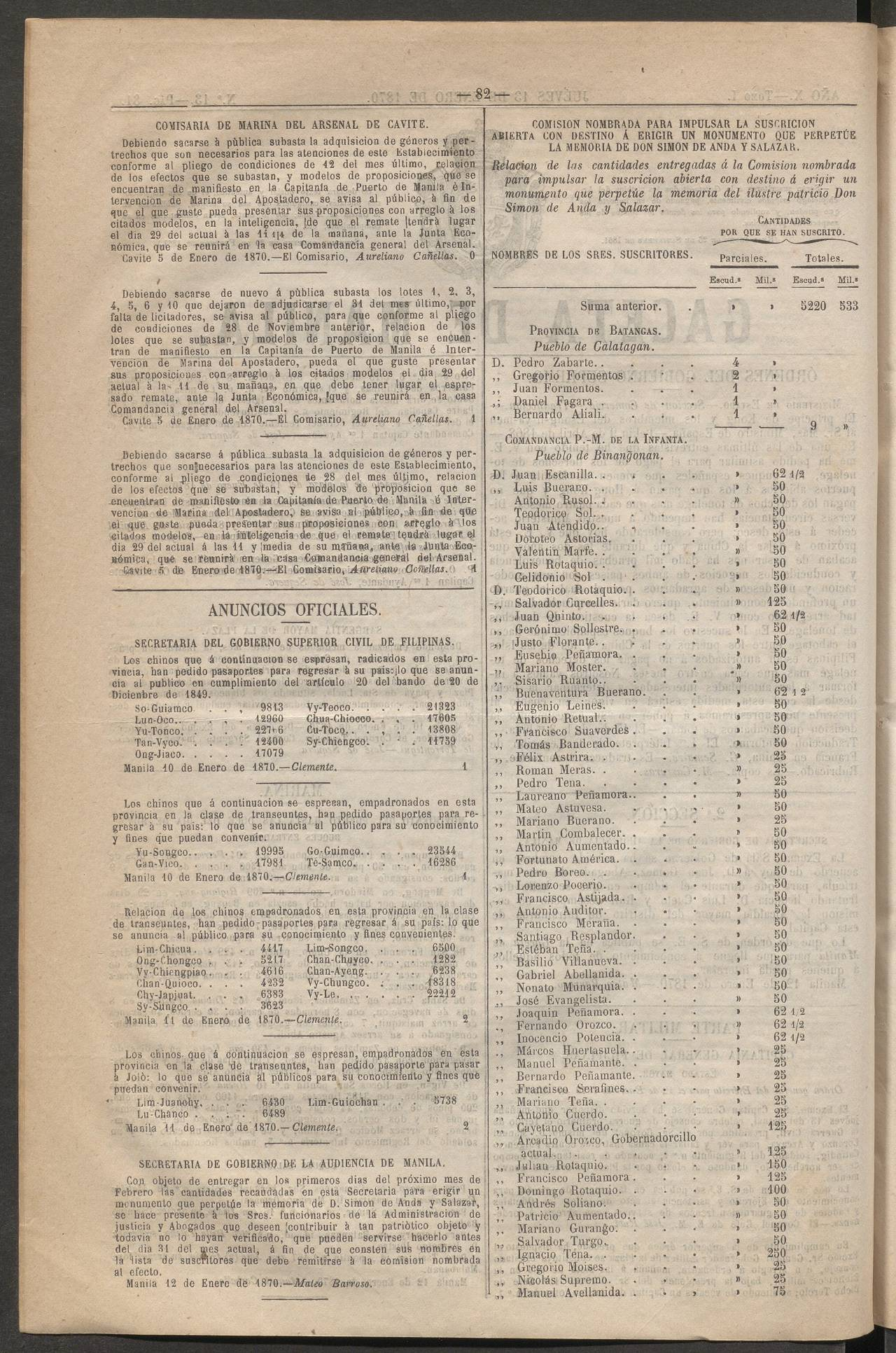
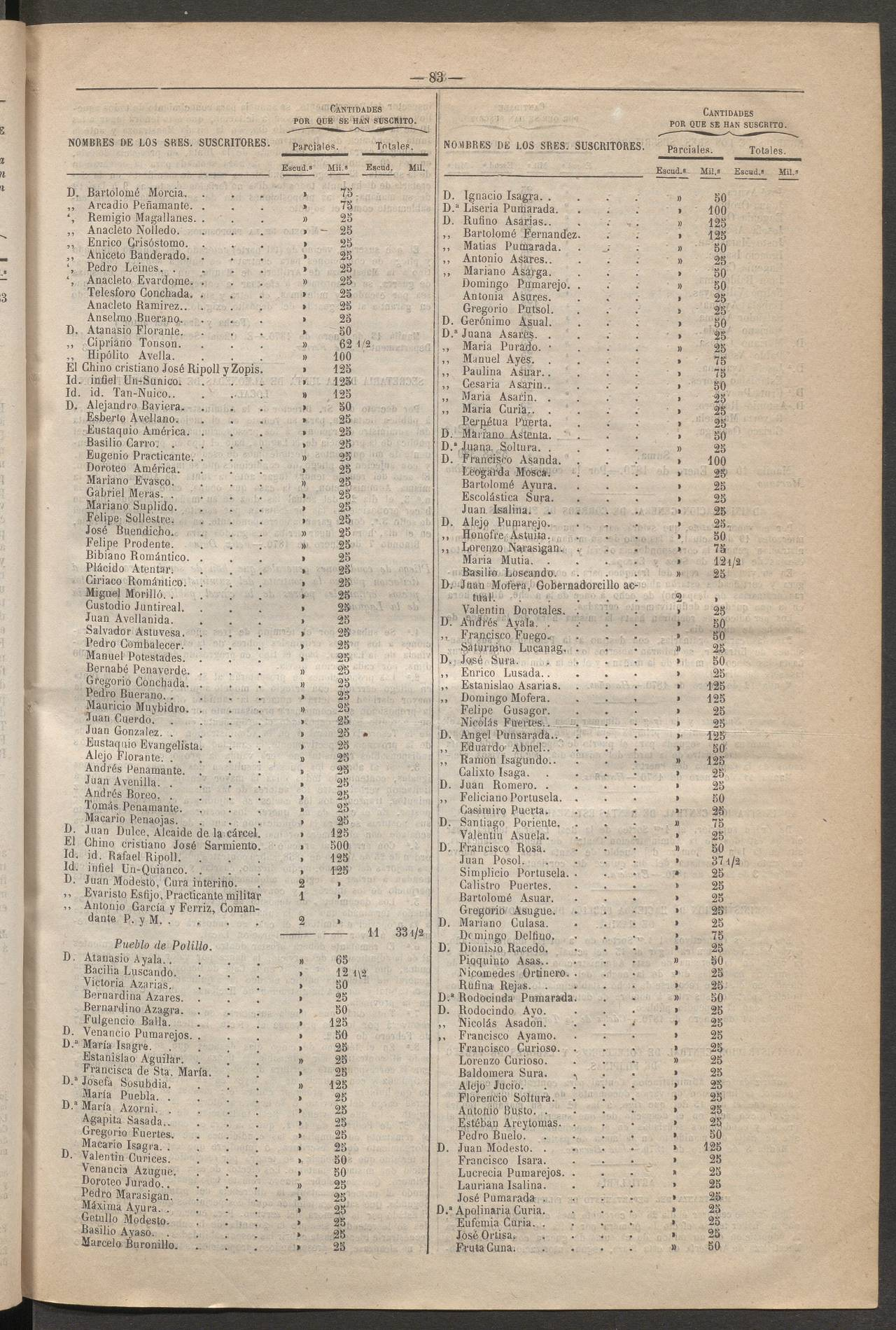
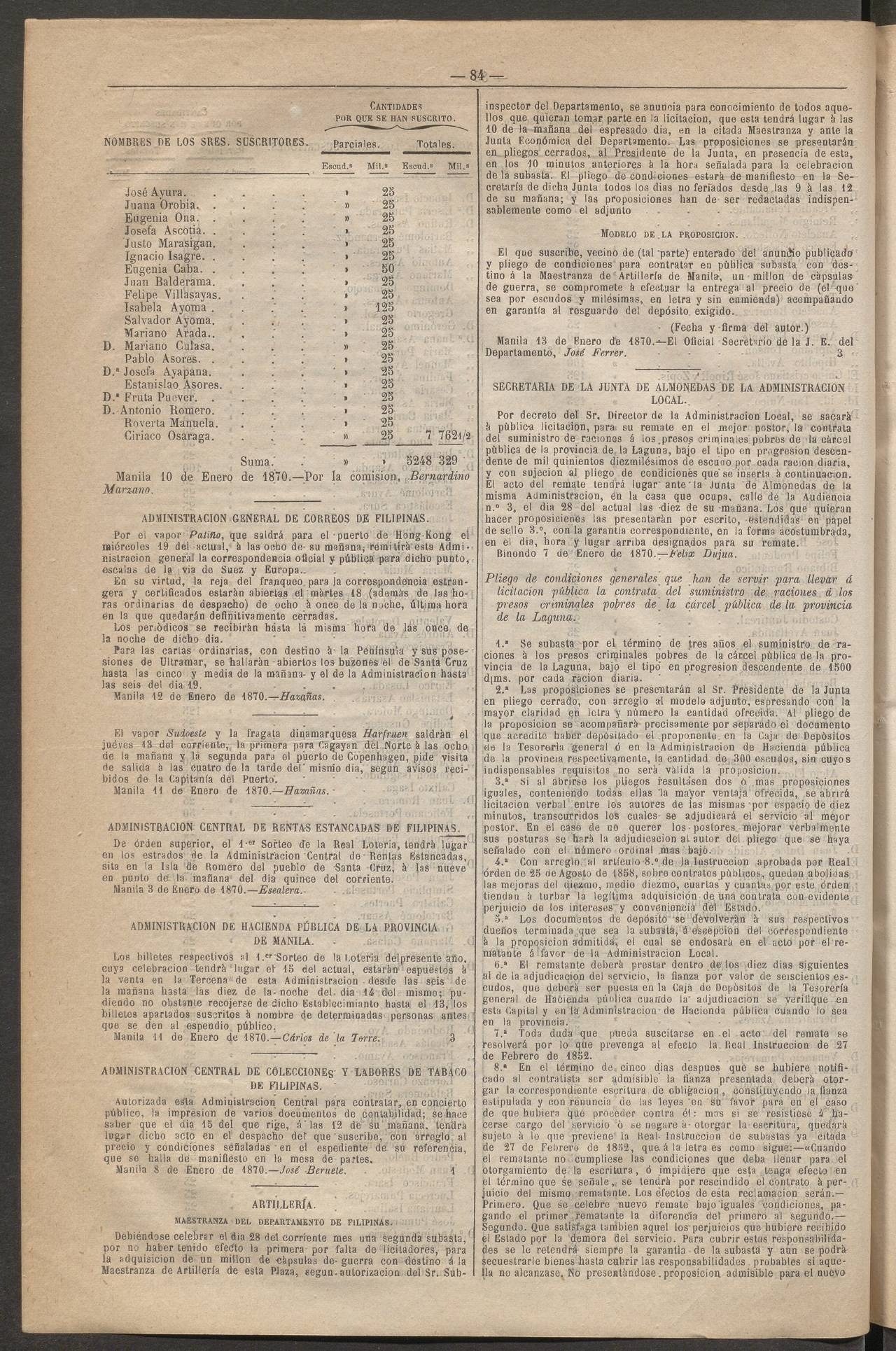
Gaceta de Manila, January 13, 1870

List of amounts donated to the Commission appointed to promote open subscription for the purpose of erecting a monument to perpetuate the memory of the illustrious patrician Don Simon de Anda y Salazar.

1877:

There is still no royal house but the court, convent and church of stone, board and nipa have already been built.

January 23-31, 1880: Visit and report of French Naturalist and Explorer Alfred Marche at Binangonan de Lampon

"The town of Binangonan de Lampon is the central point of the Contra-Costa, which has 10,000 inhabitants, 2,500 of whom pay taxes.

The main crops are rice and coconut oil, followed by cocoa and coffee. The latter grow on the edges near the huts."

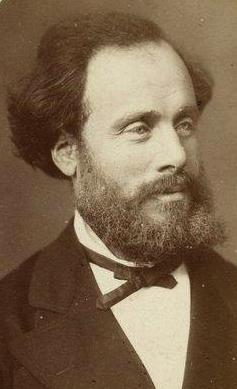
Antoine-Alfred Marche (1844–1898)

"Thanks to Commander Seco, I was able to conduct some anthropological studies; some Negritos summoned by him decided to let themselves be studied, and I took measurements of ten of them, men and women.

Small and stocky, these Negritos are generally brachycephalic; their lips, not pendulous, are rarely thick; their nose is flat along its entire length; their eyes are yellow-brown, and their ears, of average size, deviate only slightly from the head. Purebred subjects have little hair, and their frizzy hair is arranged in tufts.

Their only weapons are the bow and arrow. The bow is made from the rib of a palm leaf and the arrow from rattan. The point varies in shape and size; it is coated with a layer of very violent poison. A rolled palm leaf serves as a quiver.

As ornaments, they wear buffalo leather rings on their arms, through which they pass fragrant flowers."

— Alfred Marche, Rapport General sur une Mission a la Presqu'ile Malacca et aux Iles Philippines

July 14-20, 1880: Luzon Earthquake of 1880

"...On the night of July 14, the first tremor, which was much, much more intense than in the capital, to the point that the inhabitants of Binangonan claimed to be the biggest they had felt since the year 63. That same night, until nine in the morning of the 15th, the shaking was repeated nine times. On the 15th, 16th, 17th and 18th, the repetitions were so frequent that, according to several people assured us, not an hour passed without some commotion being felt, with the particularity that most of them were preceded by subterranean noise. Shortly after noon on the 18th, the great tremor occurred, which ended the one that caused all the damage to the buildings and accidents in the terrain of which we will speak later. After this, the earth ceased to move perceptibly until the 20th, when four more tremors were felt during the afternoon and night, and it was not possible for us to ascertain the precise hours, even though it is logical to suppose that they were the same as in Manila. The intensity of the tremors of the 20th was, according to those people, incomparably less than that of the 18th.

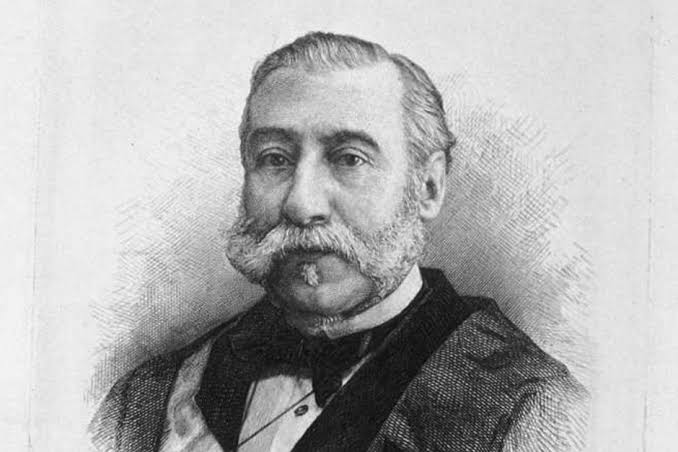
Jose Centeno y Garcia

In the following days small unimportant shocks were felt with some frequency, which were weaker and weaker until they were completely extinguished.

On the island of Polillo, as the Governor of the district assured us, the only tremor on the 18th was felt, which caused slight damage to the church."

— Jose Centeno y Garcia, Memoria sobre los temblores de tierra ocurridos en julio de 1880 en la isla de Luzon

December 22, 1880: Jose Centeno y Garcia arrived at Infanta District capital- Binangonan de Lampon.

"...at the time of our arrival at the Infanta (December 22) it is absolutely impossible to make the crossing (to Polillo) without imminent danger of shipwrecking.

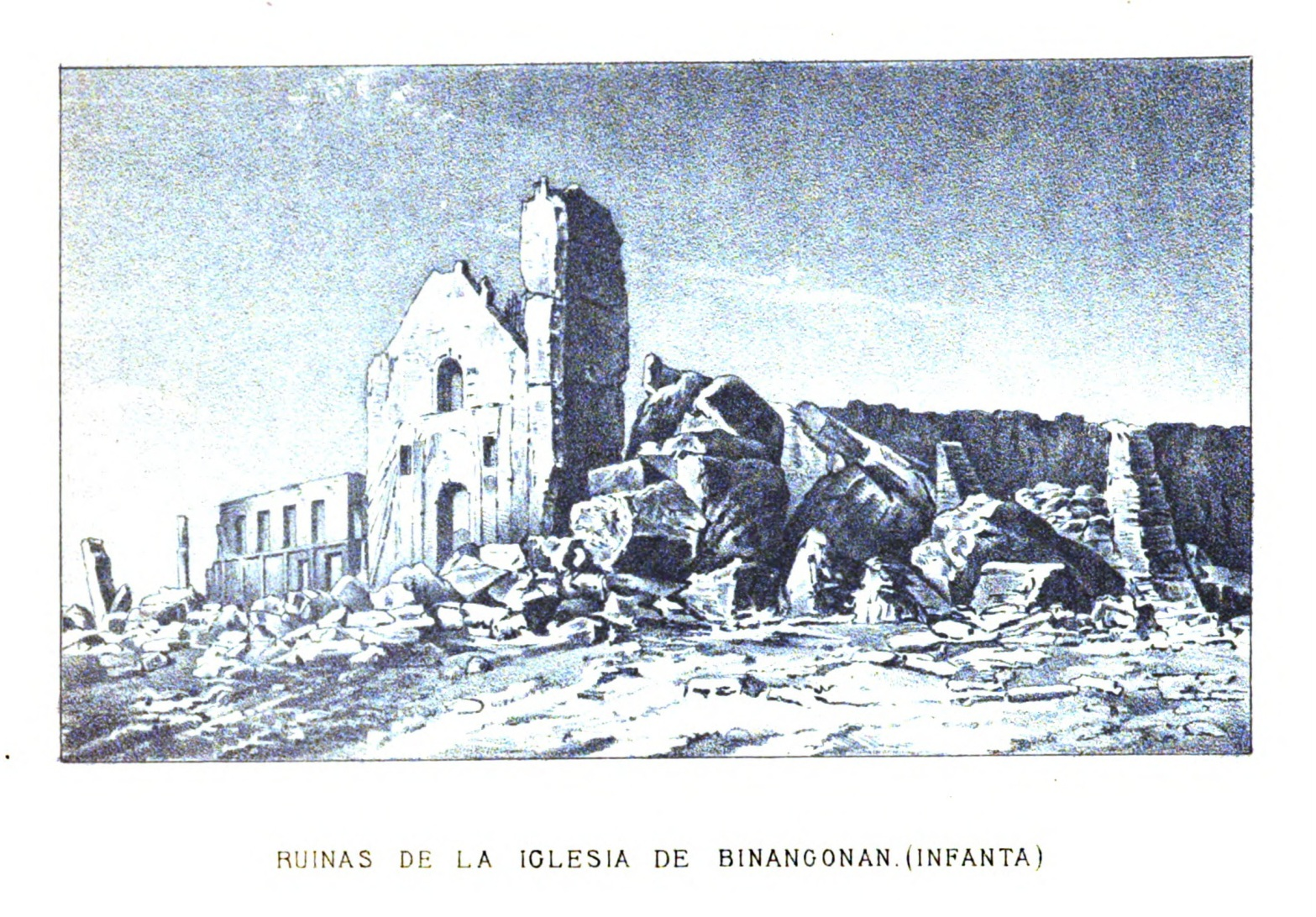
Ruins of Binangonan de Lampon Church

The effects produced in the buildings by the earthquake of 18 in Binangonan were the following: the church, the tower and the convent, the only masonry constructions in the town, which according to what we were assured were not in good condition, they fell to the ground. The church had concrete walls and a nipa roof. The tower was entirely made of concrete, and the convent was made of concrete with a tile roof. The fall was total, especially that of the tower, whose foundations were 'removed' to the point of raising the ground that surrounded them.

— Jose Centeno y Garcia, Memoria sobre los temblores de tierra ocurridos en julio de 1880 en la isla de Luzon

August 13, 1884:

It is known from a telegram received yesterday that the infantry captain who held that P.M. Command, D. José Nuñez y Nuñez, has died in Binangonan de Lampon (Infanta).

August 23, 1884: La Oceania Española

By the Hon. Mr. Captain General, the infantry captain D. Juan Sierra has been appointed military-political commander of the Infanta district.

June 18, 1891: La Oceanía Española

File promoted by several Barangay heads of the town of Binangonan de Lampon, head of the lnfanta district, requesting that a new town be created on the site of San Rafael or Puerto Real.

1895:

File on the creation of a 2nd class assistant position for the girls' school in the town of Polillo, in the Infanta District

July 11, 1896: El Comercio (Manila)

By the General Government, at the proposal of the General Inspection of Public Works, the following agreements have been signed: Approving the budget presented by P. M. Comandante of La Infanta for the repair of schools at Binañgonan de Lampon for the amount of $281-87
