= Pablo Astilla =

Filipino revolutionary colonel, nationalist and former Governor

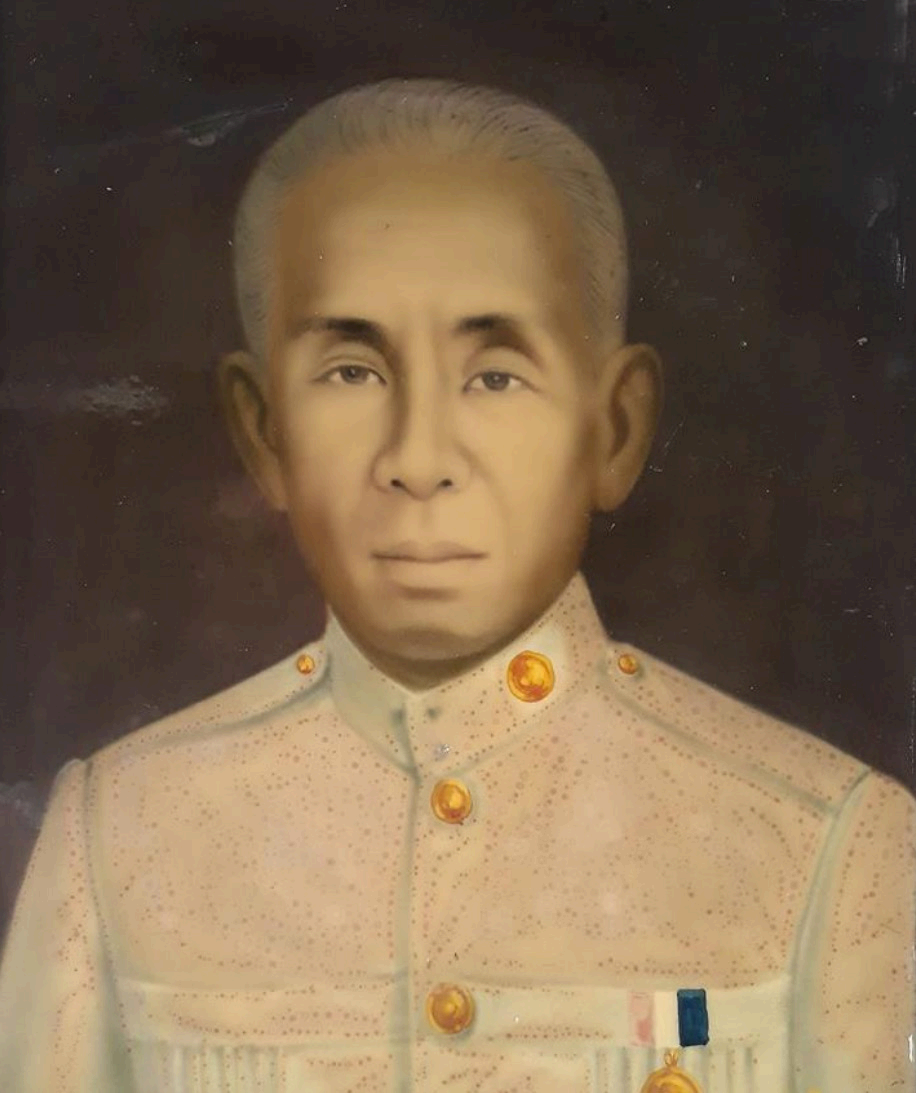
- Born: Pablo Astilla y Huertasuela c. 1853/1854
- Died: c. 1945/1946; Infanta, Quezon, Commonwealth of the Philippines
- Burial place: Astilla Cemetery (Now part of Infanta Municipal Cemetery)
- Spouse: Agripina Orozco
- Military career
- Allegiance: First Philippine Republic; Katipunan
- Branch: Philippine Revolutionary Army
- Rank: Colonel
- Conflicts: Philippine Revolution; Battle of Mount Puray; Philippine-American War; Battle of Mabitac

Politico-Military Governor of Distrito de La Infanta
- In office 1898–1901

Signature
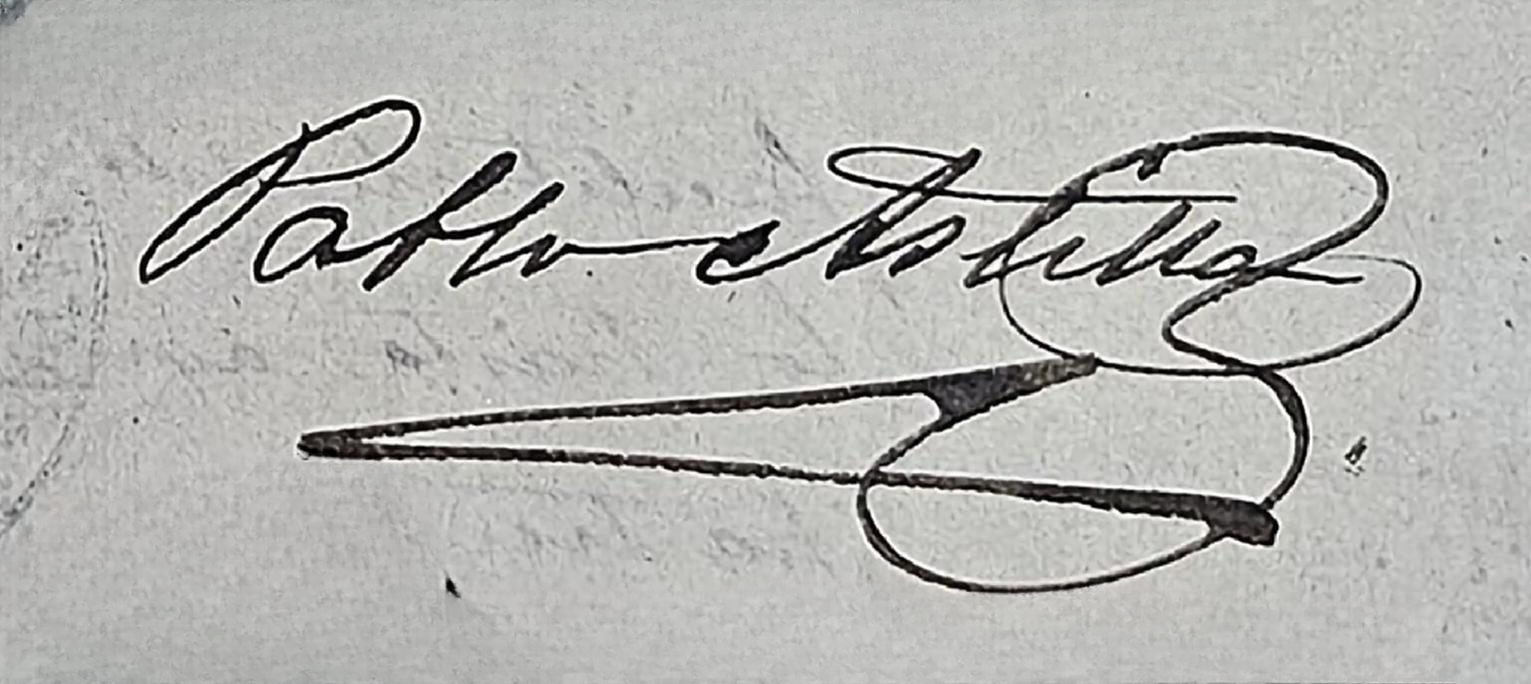

Pablo Astilla y Huertasuela was a Filipino revolutionary and military officer who served as politico-military governor of the Distrito de La Infanta during the Philippine Revolution and Philippine–American War.

== Public Office ==
Before his documented involvement in the revolutionary movement, Pablo Astilla served as gobernadorcillo of Binangonan de Lampon (present-day Infanta, Quezon) in 1896 and 1897. An official record of the Tribunal de Binangonan de Lampon, dated 6 April 1896, identifies Astilla as the town's incumbent gobernadorcillo. The record concerns an inspection of the local school and teachers' quarters which he signed in his official capacity. A separate certification dated 31 August 1896 likewise identifies him as “Gobernadorcillo actual” (incumbent gobernadorcillo) and bears his signature. In that document, Astilla certified the prevailing price of white rice and the corresponding ration in the town. In 26 February 1897, El Comercio reported that the Spanish colonial government had awarded Pablo Astilla a Medal of Civil Merit. The notice identified him as the gobernadorcillo of the cabecera of La Infanta. These records provide documentary evidence of Astilla's service as the municipal gobernadorcillo during the final years of Spanish colonial administration, prior to his subsequent involvement in the revolutionary government.

Under the Revolutionary Government and First Philippine Republic, he was the Politico-Military Governor of District of Infanta where he led the Infanta resistance against the invading American forces during the Philippine-American War

After the war, Colonel Pablo Astilla continued his public service as the Town President (Mayor) of Infanta, Tayabas from 1908 to 1910.

In 1935, Astilla was listed as a delegate to the Constitutional Assembly representing the municipality of Infanta in Tayabas.

== Philippine Revolution ==
Pablo Astilla is reported to have participated in the Battle of Mount Puray on June 14, 1897, a significant engagement between Filipino revolutionaries and Spanish forces. The battle was a turning point in the revolution, as it enabled Emilio Aguinaldo to retreat safely and eventually reach Biak-na-Bato where he established a stronghold.

In a narrative written by Fr. Felix Angel, Astilla served as Jefe del Distrito within the local Katipunan organization. On July 20, 1898, he led the Infanta Katipuneros in an uprising against Spanish forces, resulting in Spanish surrender. This victory effectively ended Spanish political and military authority in Distrito de La Infanta.

== Revolutionary Government and First Philippine Republic ==
Following the collapse of Spanish colonial authority, Pablo Astilla emerged as the political and military leader of the Infanta district under the Revolutionary Government. By August 1898, the Revolutionary Government of the Philippines listed Infanta among the provinces under its administration. Contemporary revolutionary records subsequently identify Pablo Astilla as a politico-military governor of Infanta. By 1900, Astilla was serving as Colonel and Politico-Military Chief of the District of Infanta. Astilla undertook the reorganization of local military forces, drawing both on volunteers and on former members of the colonial militia, to form a provincial regiment aligned with the Revolutionary Army.

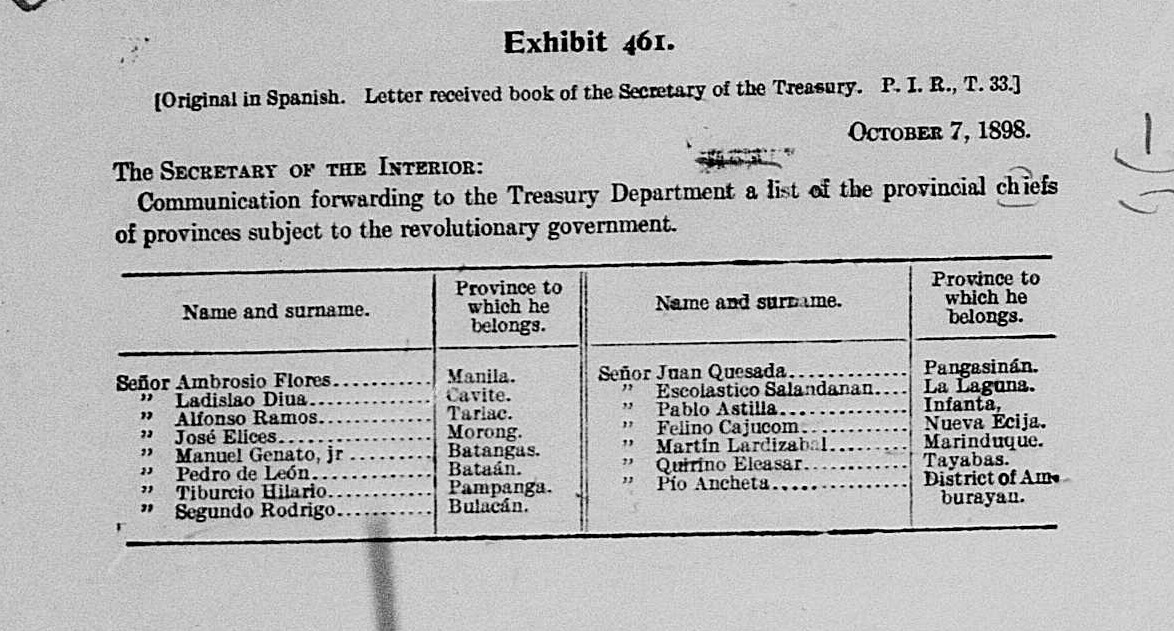
(Note: "Exhibit 461: Philippine Insurgent Records, T33, Communication forwarding to the Treasury Department a list of the provincial chiefs of provinces subject to the revolutionary government.". , October 7, 1898. National Archive Microfilm Publications, Image Group Number 008888142.) Exhibit 461: Communication forwarding to the Treasury Department a list of the provincial chiefs of provinces subject to the revolutionary government.

== Philippine–American War ==
In a revolutionary document dated 19 March 1900 and issued at Binangonan, Pablo Astilla signed a military communication as colonel and commanding officer of his regiment. He transmitted to the regiment's officers a message attributed to revolutionary commander-in-chief Mariano Trías, which urged continued resistance against American forces through guerrilla warfare. The document provides contemporary evidence of Astilla's command of a revolutionary regiment during the Philippine–American War.

A revolutionary document dated June 30, 1900 provides direct evidence of Astilla's governmental role. The record identifies him as 'Politico-Military Governor' and places him at the government house in Binangonan, where he participated in discussions concerning revolutionary funds being transferred from Camarines to revolutionary forces in Laguna.

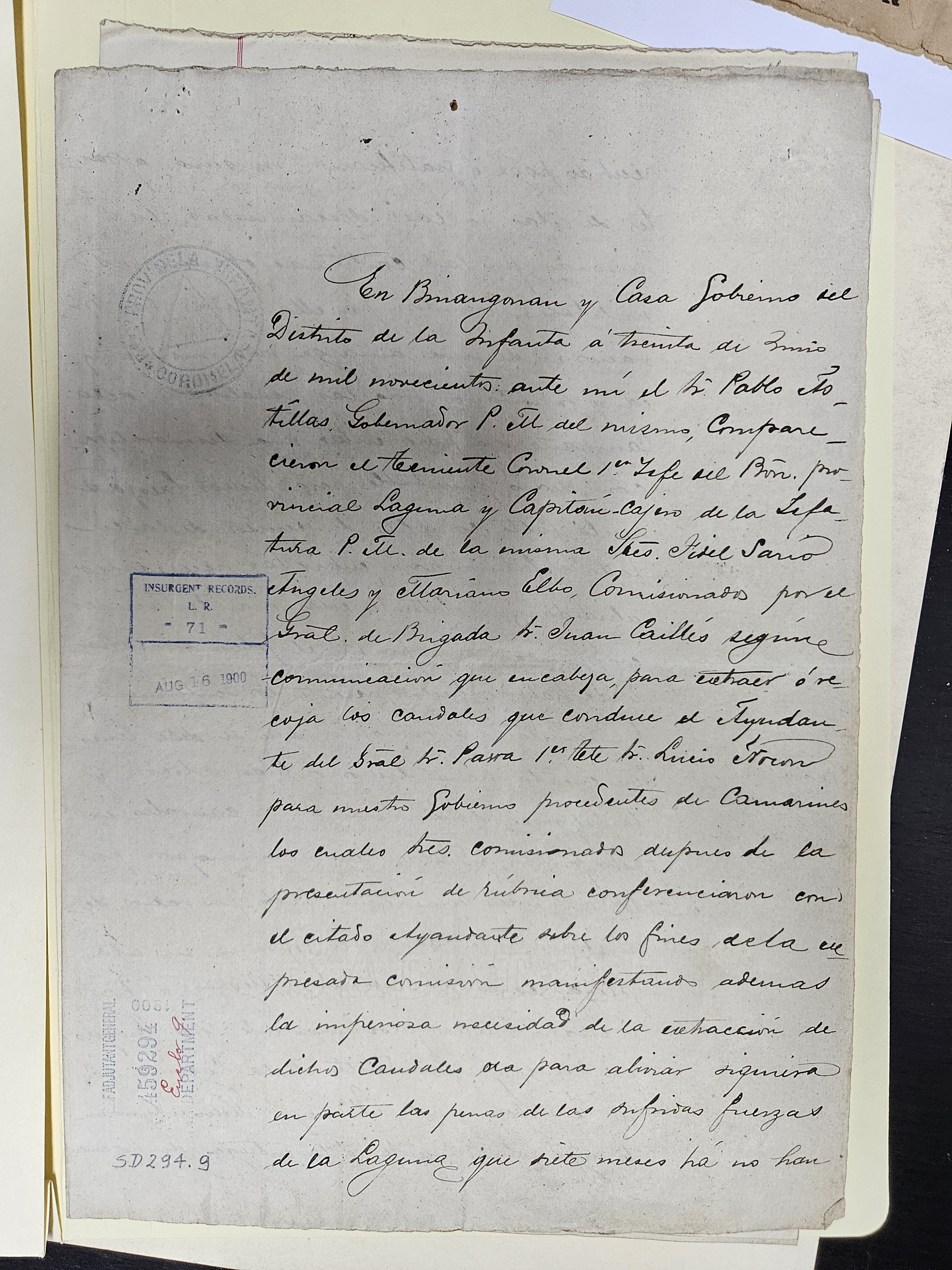
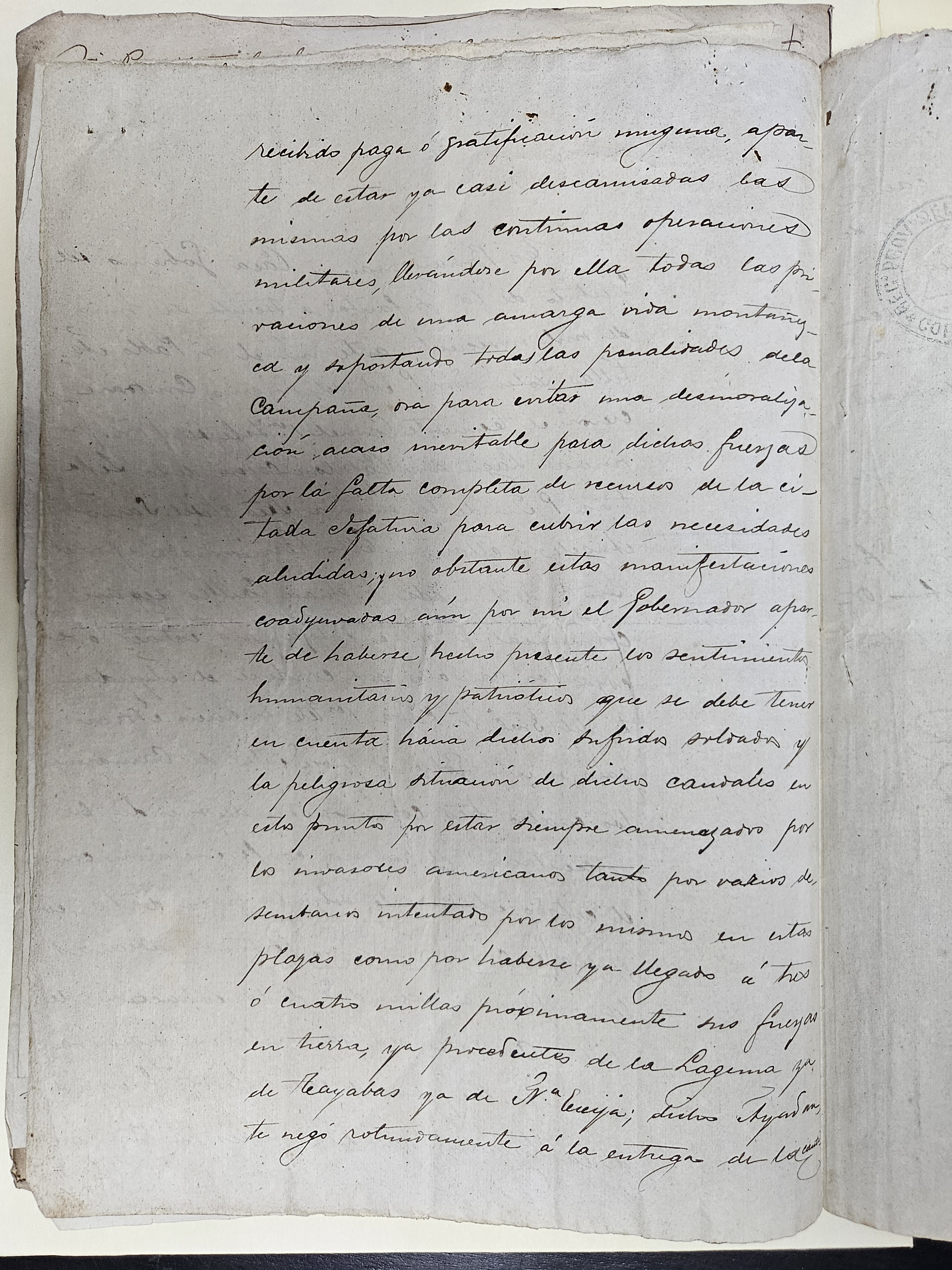
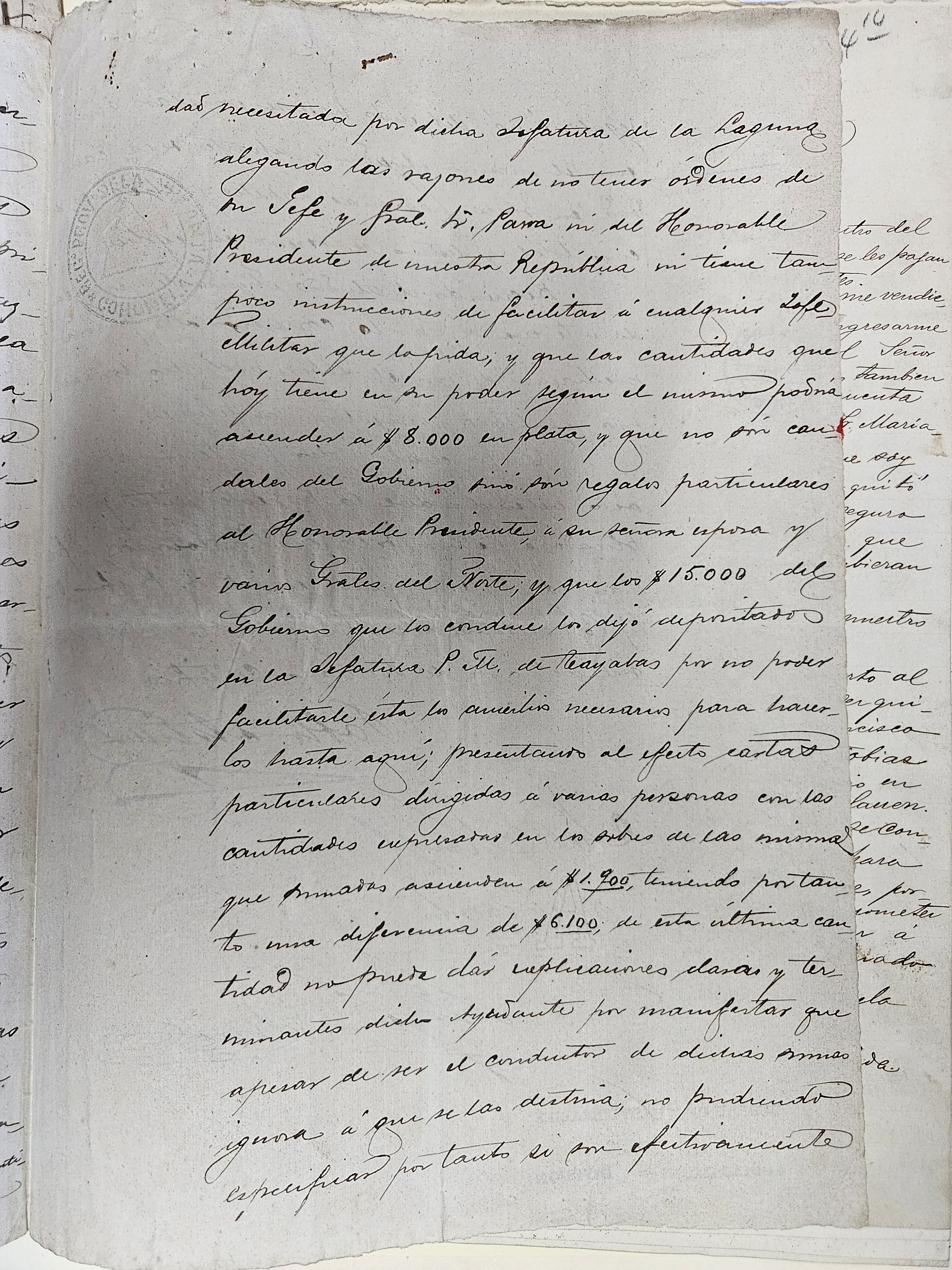
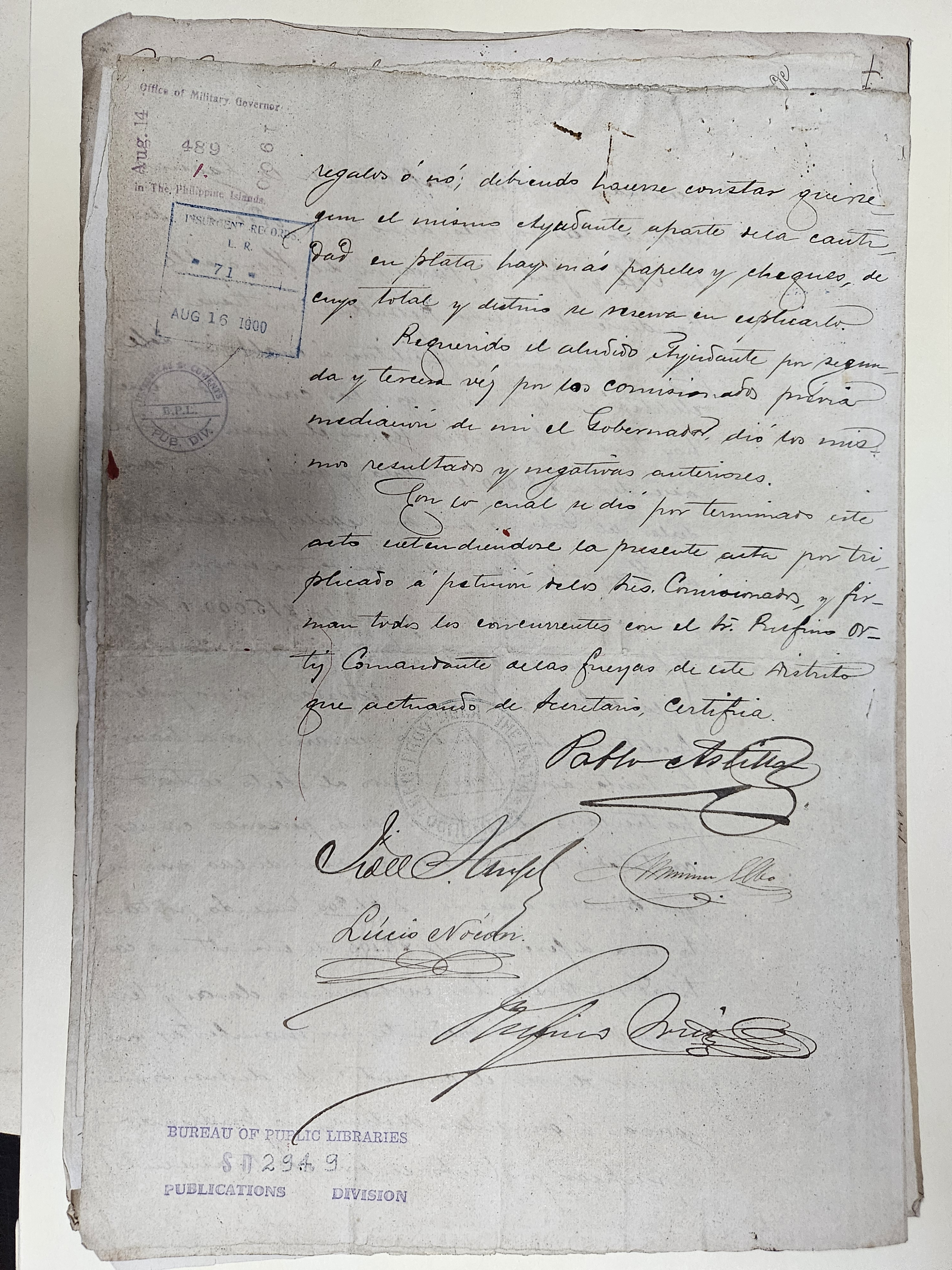
Philippine Insurgent Record (P.I.R.), SD 294.9

"In Binangonan and the Government house of the District of the Infanta, on the 30th of June, 1900, before me Sr. Pablo Astilla. Politico-Military Governor of the same appeared the Lieut.-Col, commanding the provincial battalion of Laguna and Captain Treasurer of the Politico-Military Headquarters of the same. Sres. Fidel Sario Ángeles, and Mariano Elbo, commissioned by the Brigadier Gen'l Sr. Juan Cailles according to the annexed communication to receive or collect the funds which the Adjutant of Gen. Paua, 1st Lt. Sr. Lucio Nocon, is conveying for our Government from Camarines, which commissioners, after the presentation of their signatures, conferred with the said adjutant regarding the intention of the said Commissioners, showing furthermore the Imperative necessity of the withdrawal of said funds for the alleviation, at least in part, of the affliction of the suffering forces of Laguna who have received no pay or gratuity of any kind for the past six months, and in addition, are at the present time almost shirtless from the continuous military operations in which they have been engaged, and the bitter privations of the mountain life to which they have been in consequence subjected by the hardships of the campaign, so as to avoid perhaps the inevitable demoralization of said forces on account of the complete lack of resources at the aforementioned headquarters to meet the necessities alluded to; and notwithstanding that these facts were represented by me, the Governor, apart from the humanitarian and patriotic sentiments which should be considered, in view of the destitute condition of the soldiers and the danger in this locality of said funds being taken by the American invaders..." - (P.I.R.), SD 294.9

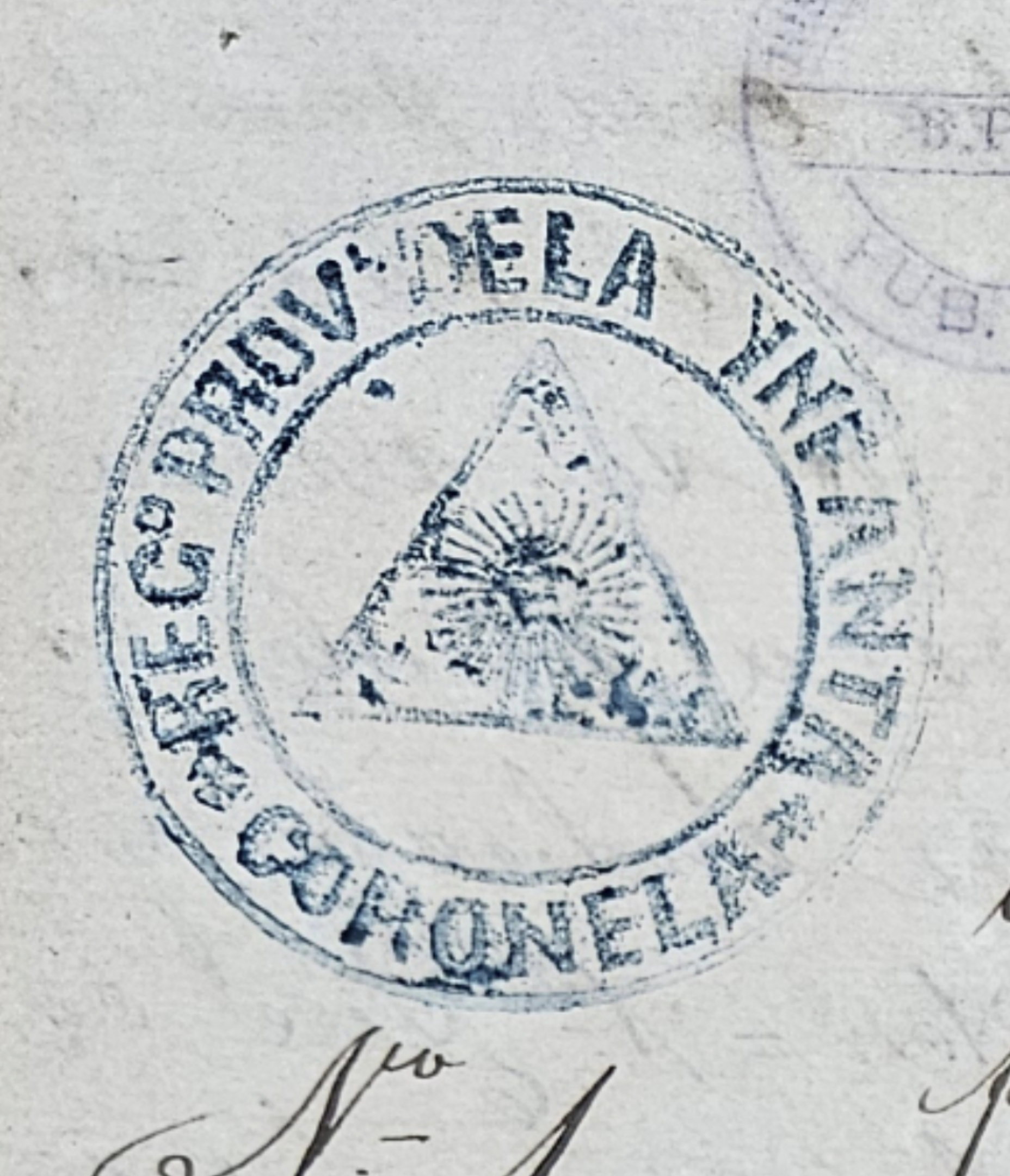
Regimental seal used by Colonel Pablo Astilla in his letters.

On August 6, 1900, General Juan Cailles wrote a correspondence to Pablo Astilla, requesting him to join forces and launch a coordinated attack against the advancing American forces in Laguna. He also requested several thousand Mauser cartridges and indicated that a representative of Lieutenant Colonel Fidel Angeles of Cailles's brigade would present himself to Astilla concerning the request. The correspondence provides contemporary evidence of Astilla's recognized political-military authority and his role in coordinating military supplies with other revolutionary forces. Responding to this call, on September 14, 1900, Astilla led the Infanta column into Mabitac, where he joined forces with Cailles. On September 17, 1900, their combined forces—along with the Baybay column— engaged and defeated the American forces commanded by Colonel Benjamin F. Cheatham, Jr. in the Battle of Mabitac.

Following the American defeat at Mabitac, on September 21, 1900, General Robert H. Hall was ordered to launch an expedition to assert control over revolutionary-held territories in the Infanta District. As part of this campaign, on October 9, 1900, American forces occupied the town of Binangonan de Lampon, then the district capital (now part of Quezon Province). Following American occupation of Infanta District's capital, revolutionary forces led by Colonel Astilla withdrew to the mountainous interior of the district, where they continued to mount guerilla resistance against American control. American military authorities referred to Astilla as the “insurgent governor” of the Province of Infanta. However, on November 23, 1900, Astilla's forces suffered a significant defeat when American troops under Captain Francis P. Fremont attacked the revolutionary headquarters at San Cristobal, a remote mountain area of Infanta. The assault disrupted local resistance, though it did not entirely extinguish the revolutionary movement in the region.

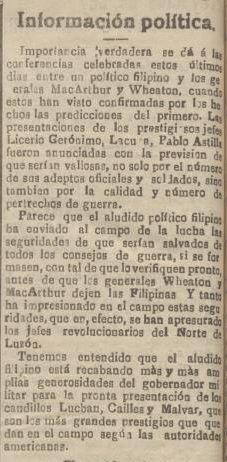
News about the capture of Licerio Geronimo, Lacuna and Pablo Astilla - El Comercio (Manila. 1869). 21/5/1901

On May 5, 1901, Colonel Pablo Astilla surrendered at Binangonan to American authorities. A U.S. War Department report identified him as “Colonel Astilla, insurgent governor, province of Infanta” and recorded that he surrendered with 10 officers and 180 men, 170 rifles, 10 revolvers, 20,000 rounds of ammunition, and 17 bronze cannon. His surrender was significant because of the number of men under his command and the quantity of arms, ammunition, and artillery surrendered with his force.

== Personal life ==
Pablo Astilla was born in either 1853 or 1854. A notarized affidavit dated 26 June 1906 recorded his age as 52, placing his birth approximately within this period. Pablo Astilla's birth record has not yet been located.

He was the son of Felipe Astilla and Ana Huertasuela. He was a farmer and producer of lambanog, a traditional Filipino distilled spirit. He married Agripina Orozco, with whom records identify at least seven children.

The date of his death is uncertain. A notarized affidavit concerning the division of his assets was filed on 31 December 1946, indicating that his estate was being settled by that date. Family testimony places his death around the period of the liberation of Infanta from the Japanese.

Colonel Pablo Astilla was a maternal grand-uncle of General Guillermo Nakar, a World War II guerrilla leader and national hero.
