= José Centeno y García =

Mining Engineer and Civil Governor of Manila

José Centeno García
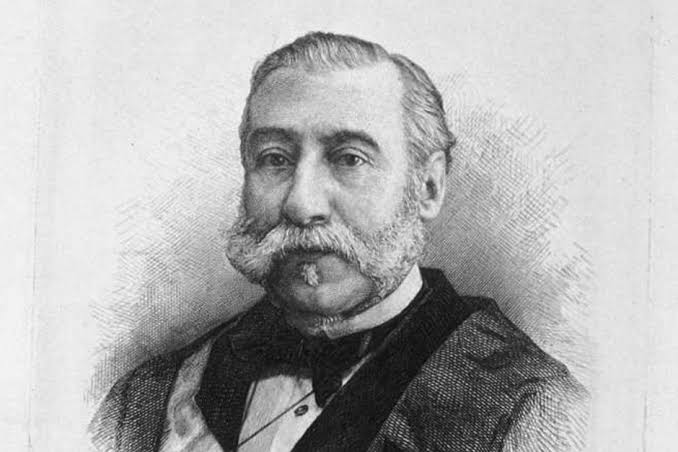
- Born: José Centeno y García; 1841; Leon, Spain
- Occupation: Mining engineer
- Notable work: Memoria Geológico-minera De Las Islas Filipinas Escrita Por El Ingeniero Inspector General Del Ramo En El Archipiélago

José Centeno y García (1841–?), was a mining engineer and liberal politician whose career bridged the technical and political arenas of 19th-century Spain and its colonies.

== Mining engineer ==
After completing his studies at the Escuela Especial de Ingenieros de Minas in Madrid in 1864, Centeno held various technical positions in mainland Spain before being appointed as a mining inspector in the Spanish colony- Philippines.

Centeno's arrival in the Philippines marked the beginning of a prolific period of scientific inquiry. He conducted extensive geological and mineralogical research across the archipelago, work that would later underpin a number of significant publications in his field.

== Philippines and politics ==
He supported the secularization of institutions such as the Dominican-run University of Santo Tomás and was openly critical of the power wielded by the religious orders. His anticlerical views made him a target of conservative elements within the colonial establishment, particularly the clergy.

In 1888, Centeno was appointed civil governor of Manila. His tenure would be short-lived but historically significant. That same year, he faced a peaceful demonstration organized by leading Filipino nationalists and municipal officials. The demonstrators demanded the exile of Archbishop Pedro Payo and the dissolution of the powerful religious orders. Rather than suppress the protest, Centeno received the activists calmly—and even went so far as to correct spelling mistakes in their manifesto. His sympathetic response caused a political scandal.

The incident alarmed conservative sectors and provoked the ire of high-ranking officials in Manila. In response, Governor General Emilio Terrero y Perinat convened the Board of Authorities, the colony's highest advisory council. The board ultimately decided to remove Centeno from his post, prompting his return to Spain. The same controversy contributed to Governor General Terrero's replacement by the hardline General Valeriano Weyler, who would later become infamous for his brutal campaigns in both the Philippines and Cuba.

== Publications ==
- Apuntes sobre las industrias minera y metalúrgica de la provincia de Oviedo, (1866)
- Memoria Geológico-minera De Las Islas Filipinas Escrita Por El Ingeniero Inspector General Del Ramo En El Archipiélago, (1876)
- Memoria sobre los Temblores de Tierra ocurridos en Julio de 1880 en la Isla de Luzon, (1882)
- Estudio Geológico del Volcán de Taal, (1885)
- Noticias acerca de los manantiales termo-minerales de Bambang y de las salinas del Monte Blanco en la provincia de Nueva Vizcaya (Filipinas), (1885)
- Memoria descriptiva de los manantiales minero-medicinales de la isla de Luzón presentada por la Comisión creada por Joaquín Jovellar y Soler, (1890)
- Las Islas Filipinas y las órdenes monásticas (conferencia), (1894)
