= Imus Assembly =

- Host country: Philippines
- Date: December 31, 1896
- Cities: Imus, Cavite
- Participants: Katipunan factions: Magdalo; Magdiwang

Key points

The Imus Assembly was the meeting held between the Magdalo and Magdiwang factions of the Katipunan at Imus, Cavite, Philippines, on December 31, 1896, the day following the execution of José Rizal. This was convened in order to settle the leadership dispute between the two factions.

The assembly, presided by Andres Bonifacio, was to discuss whether to retain the current Katipunan government or to set up a new revolutionary government. The Magdalo supported the idea of having a revolutionary government while the Magdiwang favored the old Katipunan government. The assembly, however, failed to have a firm resolution. According to Santiago Alvarez and Artemio Ricarte, the assembly agreed to appoint Bonifacio as the head of a legislative committee and to authorize him to appoint members he considers worthy. It is, however, uncertain whether Bonifacio did appoint members of the committee. At this meeting also, a Magdalo engineer and general named Edilberto Evangelista submitted a draft of a constitution requested by the two factions. Bonifacio ignored the constitution since the Katipunan already had its own laws.

Contention at the assembly further deepened the rift between Bonifacio, who favored the Magdiwag faction and Aguinaldo, who favored the Magdalo faction. This was exacerbated by Aguinaldo proposing Evangelista as President of the revolutionary government on the basis that he was the best educated. With nothing definite having been decided, another meeting of leaders, later to be known as the Tejeros Convention was called at San Francisco de Malabon (now General Trias).
