= Acta de Tejeros =

1897 historical document during the Philippine Revolution

Acta de Tejero
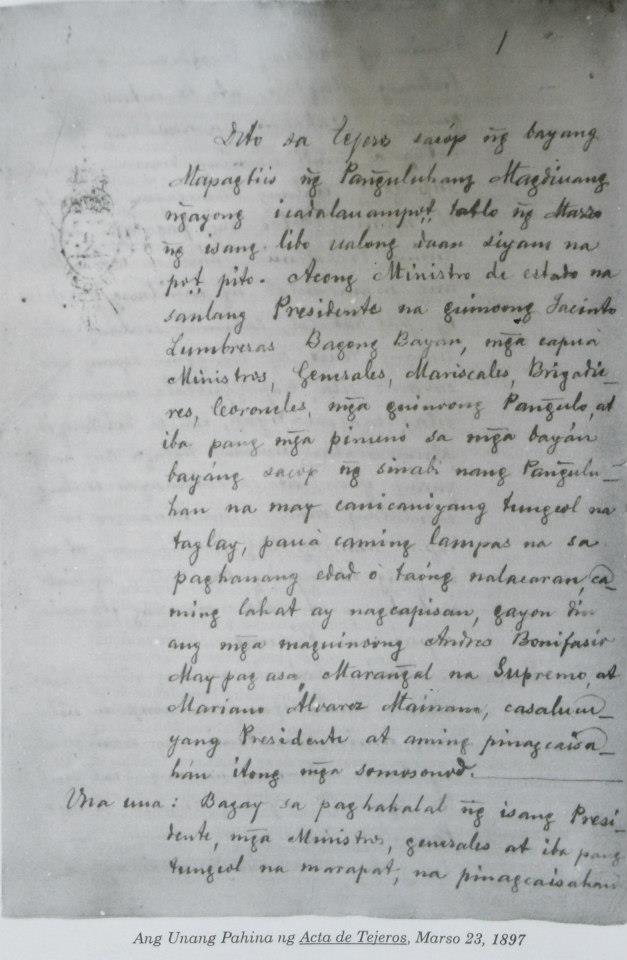
- The Acta de Tejeros

The Acta de Tejeros was a document prepared on March 23, 1897 which proclaimed the events at the Tejeros Convention on March 22 to have been disorderly and tarnished by chicanery. Signatories to this petition rejected the insurgent government instituted at the convention and affirmed their steadfast devotion to the ideals of the Katipunan. This and the later Naic Military Agreement repudiating the Tejeros Convention results would later cost Andres Bonifacio his life. He would be tried for treason at Maragondon, Cavite on May 10, 1897 and sentenced to death.

== English translation ==
Here at Tejeros, within the jurisdiction of the town of Mapagtiis of the Magdiwang Presidency, this twenty-third of March one thousand eight hundred ninety seven

I, Minister of State and Acting President, Mr. Jacinto Lumberas, Bagong Bayan, fellow Ministers, Generals, Marshals, Brigadiers, Colonel, Presidents and other leaders from the town within the jurisdiction of the said Presidency having offices which they are vested, each of us of legal age and competent, have convened together and also with messengers: Andres Bonifacio (Maypagasa), esteemed Supremo; and Mariano Alvarez (Mainam), the present President, and our agreement as follows:

First: As regards the election of a President, Ministers, Generals and other necessary officers, we came to an agreement with the other Presidency, the Magdalo Presidency, and [the election] was accordingly held yesterday at the aforementioned Tejeros, but we are not content because it was not well conducted. We discovered that our Presidency in truth was wronged, because almost all their ballot papers were written by just one person, and [issued to] unqualified people so as to give them a majority. We have learned that they conspired together, and for this reason we consider that what happened there was invalid. No document, in fact, was prepared to formalize the new arrangements, which needed our signed endorsement. Yet another major deficiency was that some of our brother chiefs were elsewhere and unable to attend.

Second: We have discovered their secret moves, audacious and improper, to place our Presidency under their control. For some reason not known here in our Presidency, General Emilio Aguinaldo invited the presidents in our jurisdiction to consider a matter not mentioned in the printed letter.

Third: Two towns under their jurisdiction, Silang and Marinas, were captured by the Spanish enemy, and very many of our soldiers died as a result, and in addition to our having made contributions of cash, animals and rice, we had many wounded and suffered other great losses. But thanks to the mercy of God, not one of the towns under our jurisdiction has been captured by the said enemy.

Fourth: Not once have we solicited any kind of aid from them, whereas they have from us.

Fifth: Our people have been fighting practically day and night in order to defend them, as well as contributing greatly in other ways, and the reward has been an attempt to take our Presidency away from us by fraud.

Sixth: We began the rebellion and they came later. In this regard, we have realised that their actions towards us are not those of true brothers, and we have agreed to distance ourselves from them so that our Presidency cannot be made subordinate, whatever happens. But they are the ones who should submit and be put to right, because they caused all the trouble. We ratify this document under a binding oath to commit our lives and wealth to the defence and support of our said Presidency. All of us, other affiliates and those who wish to become affiliates, will abide by this document. Should any amongst us come to suffer misfortune, openly or secretly, or be wickedly killed, we shall all investigate and shall not rest until the perpetrator, if such there be, is found and duly punished. We resolve also that should any amongst us betray this compact, we shall all turn upon him without mercy. We shall likewise act vigorously to track down individuals who presume to commit some vile treason against the K.K.K. and the Presidency, or against any of our brethren. We shall pursue them relentlessly and despatch them to the Presidency as soon as possible for punishment. We conclude this compact in the name of the revered Catipunan, all signing with our names, surnames and names in the said Catipunan. Although we are many, we are united as one in our sentiment, courage, solidarity, unworthiness and life. This resolution will be kept securely in the Presidency, and printed copies will be despatched to towns of the same accord to be likewise safely kept by brother Presidents or other leaders. This was done on the month, day and year above written.

The Sovereign Nation

J. Lumbreras
And. Bonifacio - Maypagasa
Mariano Alvarez - Mainam
Artemio Ricarte - Vibora
Santiago Alvarez - Apoy
Santos Nocon - Buhat
Diego Moxica - Katibayan
Andres Villanueva -Gumamela
Jose Coronel - Alimbuyuguin
Nicols P. Ginicu - Mangyari
Marcelo Lumbreras - M/Batangbago [?]
Ricardo Garcia - Tanauin [?]
Alfonso Siacon [?]
Lucio Riel [?] Kapayapaan
A. Villanueva - Kampupot

L. San Miguel Maon [?]
Damaso [?] - Mag-patay [?]
Dioncio Kases [?] - Mabuti
Nicolas Ricafrente - Saklolo [?]
Bernardo Espineli [?] - Angkiko [?]
Isabelo Borromeo [?] Guiami [?]
Adriano Olaez
Epifanio Malia
Macario Calalang
Mariano Alvarez
P. Villana [?] - Buan [?]
Jacinto Angkiko - Maagap
Gregorio Ricafrente

Note: Signatures in the above where spelling is uncertain are indicated by [?].
