= Battle of Noveleta =

Philippine revolution battle (1896)

- Part of the Philippine Revolution
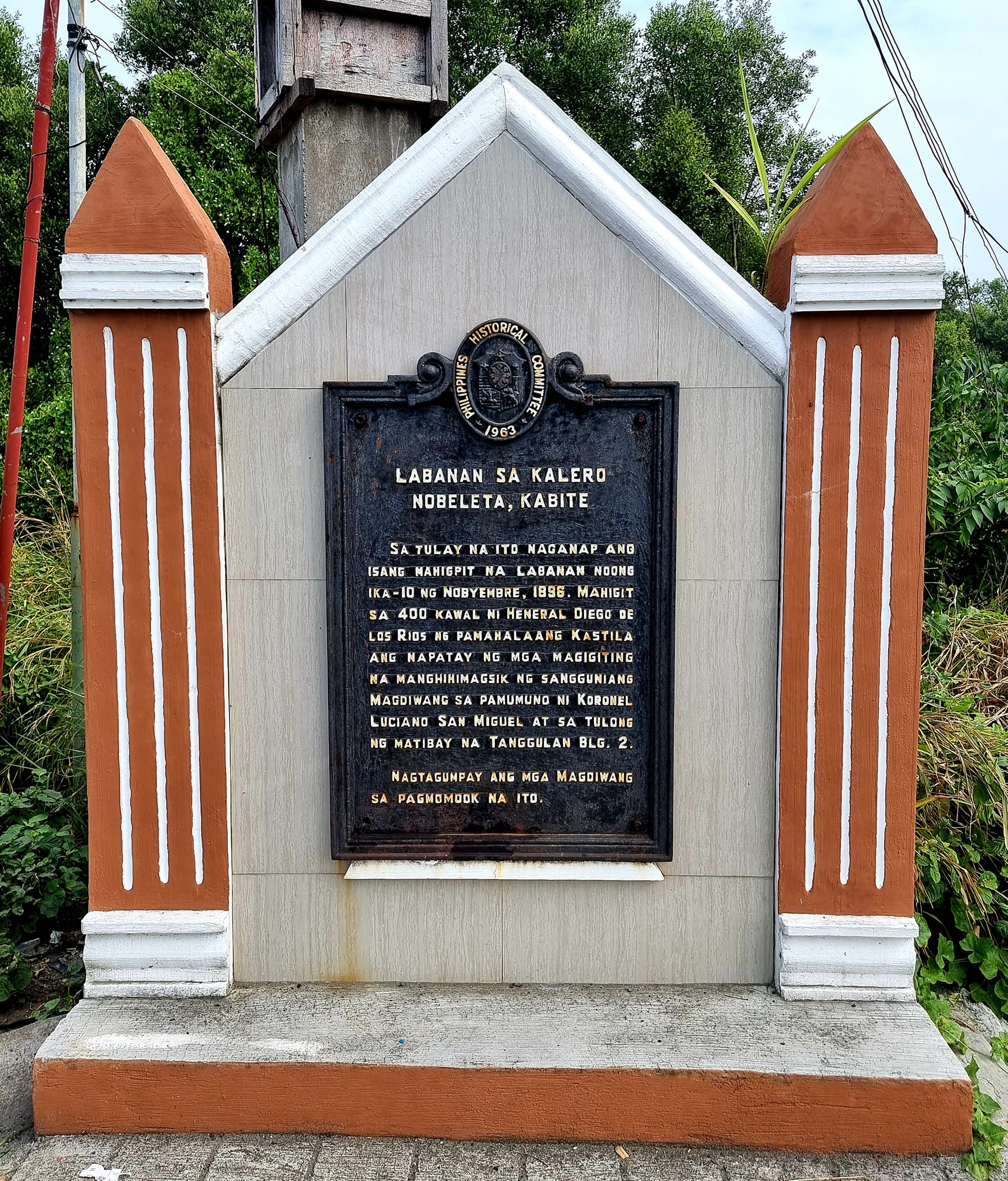
- Historical Marker of the Battle of Noveleta
Date	August 30, 1896
Location	Noveleta, Cavite, Philippines
Result	Filipino victory

Belligerents
Katipunan: Magdiwang	Spanish Empire: Guardia Civil

Commanders and leaders
Santiago Alvarez; Pascual Alvarez	Ramón Blanco; Diego de los Ríos

Strength
10,000 men	22,000

Casualties and losses
~500+	~500+ (Several captured)

The Battle of Noveleta known as Battle of Calero Bridge was a major battle during the Philippine revolution and was one of the first engagements of the revolution in Cavite. In the latter part of the revolution, Noveleta played a key role for the Magdalo and Magdiwang factions. From its capture by the Magdiwang at the start of the revolution, various battles were fought and won by Filipino rebels in Cavite. Noveleta became the seat of the Magdiwang faction of the Katipunan.

== Background ==
After the Revolution exploded in the north, under Andres Bonifacio, the generals of Cavite took up arms as early as August 28, and was one of the eight provinces who were put under martial law after the outbreak of the Revolution. Cavitenos first officially joined the revolution on the 31st of August, when Emilio Aguinaldo took his hometown of Kawit and with Santiago Álvarez taking Noveleta.

=== "First Cry of Cavite" ===
At ten o'clock in the morning of August 31, 1896, Diego Mojica, Mariano Trías, and Nicolas Portilla attacked the town hall of San Francisco de Malabon (now General Trias) and Pasong Kalabaw. The attacks of Noveleta and Kawit soon followed, these first three battles are known as the "first cry of Cavite", starting with the attack at Pasong Kalabaw. The first official victory in Cavite as well as the first victories of the revolution occurred in these hours.

== Battle ==
The battle began early on August 30, 1896, at around noon, a number of revolutionaries led by Santiago Álvarez and Mariano Álvarez attacked and quickly captured the town, guarded by a few Spanish troops under the command of Diego De Los Rios and Ramon Blanco. The town was quickly captured and declared the seat of the Magdiwang council. During the battle, two Spanish officers were killed while the rest of the garrison was captured, The revolutionary forces also seized 29 firearms. Similar battles occurred in Noveleta fought by both factions and Santiago Álvarez eventually became the hero of the battle of Calero bridge in November of the same year. This is because of its strategic position near the Puerto De Cavite, the capital of Spanish Cavite and the second most important city to capture for the Revolutionaries. Upon capturing Noveleta, the Magdiwang were reinforced and under the orders of Gen. Alvarez, the Magdiwang built a number of entrenchments outside of the city better known as Bateria numbers 1, 2 and 3, and used some captured emplacements (a small redoubt, trenches and a fortification) to prepare for the Spanish counterattack. The Spaniards set up camp near rebel forts in Dalahican and attacked Noveleta again in early November, near The heavily fortified shores of Dagatan and Dalahican.

=== Spanish counterattack ===
Four days later, the Spaniards tried to recapture the town with a contingency of at least 3,000 troops stationed at fortifications put up by Gen. Blanco to retake parts of Cavite. Outnumbered, the Spaniards were overpowered, and the attacks failed and once again, the Filipino revolutionaries defended Noveleta from Spanish troops using captured defenses and arms. Both sides suffered moderate casualties and Filipino troops managed to take some more arms to improve the defenses at Noveleta.

== Legacy ==
Noveleta was one of the first major triumphs of the Katipuneros in Cavite and it proved the military prowess of the Magdiwang faction, this played a crucial role in affecting Bonifacio's decision on whom to favor at the Tejeros Convention. After an almost bloodless triumph, the townspeople under the Magdiwang flag, would eventually see far more action than anywhere else in Cavite, witnessing 4 major battles and engagements.

== References and external links ==
1. Cavite Gov't on the battle.
2. Gen. Santiago Alvarez

Specific
