= Santiago Álvarez =

Santiago Álvarez may refer to:

- Santiago Álvarez (general) (1872–1930), Filipino revolutionary general
- Santiago Álvarez (filmmaker) (1919–1998), Cuban filmmaker
- Santiago Álvarez (writer) (born 1973), Spanish writer
- Santiago Álvarez (rugby union) (born 1994), Argentine rugby sevens player
