= Pascual Álvarez =

General during the Philippine Revolution

The Honorable General Pascual Álvarez
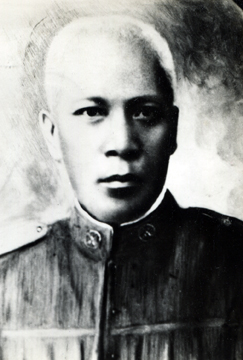
- Pascual Álvarez in c. 1900

Director of the Interior of the Tejeros Revolutionary Government
- In office April 17, 1897 – October 31, 1897
- President: Emilio Aguinaldo
- Preceded by: Position established
- Succeeded by: Isabelo Artacho

Municipal President of Noveleta
- In office 1902–1903
- Preceded by: Mariano Alvarez
- Succeeded by: Andres Ner

Vice Mayor of Noveleta
- In office 1904–1907
- Preceded by: Position established
- Succeeded by: Inocencio Salud

Personal details
- Born: May 17, 1861 Tierra Alta, Cavite, Captaincy General of the Philippines, Spanish Empire
- Died: March 8, 1923 (aged 61) Noveleta, Cavite, Insular Government of the Philippine Islands, United States
- Spouse(s): Marciana Villanueva (died 1890) Ildefonsa Angkiko
- Occupation: Government official, general

Military service
- Allegiance: First Philippine Republic; Republic of Biak-na-Bato; Katipunan (Magdiwang)
- Branch/service: Philippine Revolutionary Army
- Years of service: 1896–1900
- Rank: General
- Battles/wars: Philippine Revolution: Battle of Noveleta; Battle of Binakayan-Dalahican; Philippine–American War

Pascual Álvarez y de Jésus (May 17, 1861 – March 8, 1923) was a Filipino general during the Philippine Revolution and member of the Magdiwang revolutionary organization. He was a nephew of Mariano Álvarez and the second Municipal President of Noveleta.

Born to Sebastian Álvarez and Juana de Jésus, Álvarez was a self-made man and had no formal education. He only did self-study and was employed as a clerk in the municipal office of Tierra Alta, Cavite (present-day Noveleta). Later, he was elected cabeza de barangay, then teniente mayor, juez de paz ("Justice of the Peace"), and eventually elected as capitan municipal from 1893 to 1894. Álvarez was later named general secretary of the Katipunan's Magdiwang Council of Noveleta. He, together with his cousin Santiago and uncle Mariano, led the recapture of the Noveleta Tribunal (municipal hall) from Spanish forces on August 31, 1896. Álvarez later accepted the inaugural post of secretary of the interior in the revolutionary cabinet of General Emilio Aguinaldo. He was also present during the Pact of Biak-na-Bato as a truce to end the Philippine Revolution.

Álvarez was captured by the Americans in 1900 during the Philippine-American War. He was later appointed municipal president of Noveleta from 1902 to 1903 and was elected vice mayor from 1904 to 1907.

He married twice: first with Marciana Villanueva, a cousin of Magdiwang's General Ariston Villanueva, who died on October 20, 1890, and later with Ildefonsa Angkiko. Alvarez died on March 8, 1923, at the age of 61.
