= Battle of Noveleta (disambiguation) =

Battle of Noveleta may refer to:

- First Battle of Noveleta, an 1896 clash between Philippine independence fighters and Spanish Empire forces
- Second Battle of Noveleta, an 1899 clash between Philippine independence fighters and U.S. Marine forces under Lt. Col. George F. Elliott
