= Battle of San Francisco de Malabon =

Battle of San Francisco De Malabon First Cry of Cavite
- Part of the Philippine Revolution
Date	August 31, 1896
Location	San Francisco De Malabon, Cavite, Philippines
Result	Filipino victory
Territorial changes	Katipuneros capture San Francisco De Malabon

Belligerents
Katipunan: Magdiwang	Spanish Empire: Guardia Civil

Commanders and leaders
Diego Mojica; Artemio Ricarte; Nicolas Portilla	Ramón Blanco

Strength
3,200−4,000	900−1,100

Casualties and losses
Unknown	Unknown

The Battle of San Francisco De Malabon (Filipino: Labanan sa San Francisco De Malabon) was the first attack staged by revolutionaries in Cavite. The battle occurred at approximately 10 in the morning (local time) on 31 August 1896 near Pasong Kalabaw (Now known as Sta. Clara) and the town tribune. The uprising was fought by Magdiwang faction of the Katipunan led by Diego Mojica which signaled the start of the revolution in Cavite. Numerous uprisings occurred later that day.

General Artemio Ricarte composed the literary piece "Alaala sa 31 ng Agosto ng 1896" for the newspaper publication "Ang Bayang Kahapis-hapis" in memory of the victory achieved during the battle. The literary piece was published on the August 24, 1899 edition of the said newspaper publication.
