= Magdiwang =

Magdiwang may refer to the following:

- Magdiwang (Katipunan faction), a faction of the 19th century Philippine revolutionary group Katipunan.
- Magdiwang, Romblon, a Philippine municipality
- Magdiwang Party, a political party in 21st century Philippines
