= Tejeros Convention =

Philippine elections of 1897

- March 22, 1897
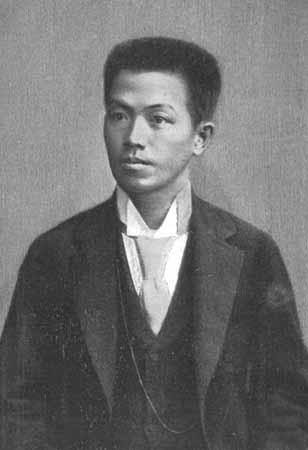

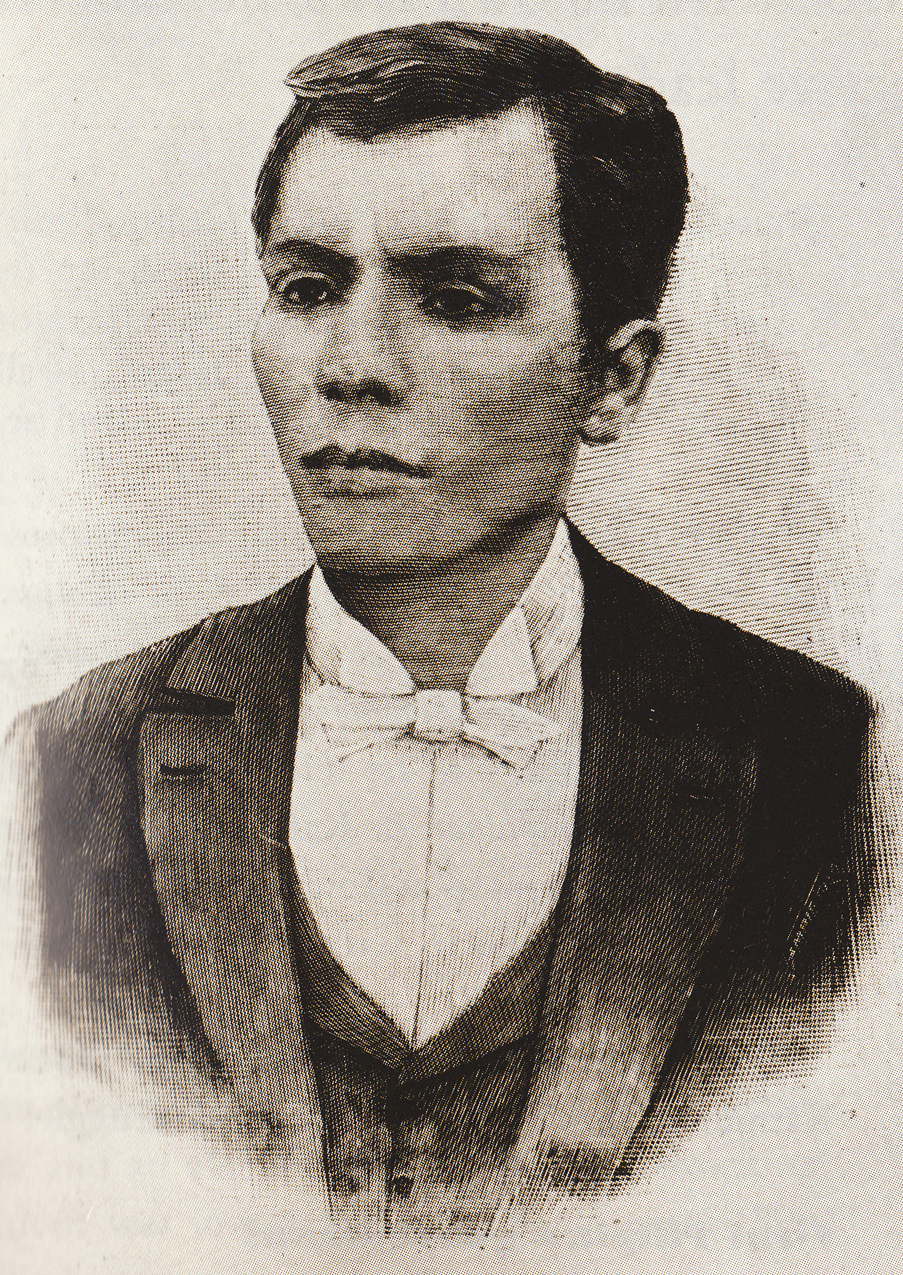

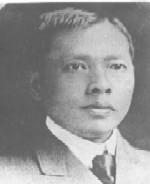
Nominee	Emilio Aguinaldo	Andrés Bonifacio	Mariano Trías
Alliance	Magdalo	Katipunan Supreme Council; Magdiwang ally	Magdiwang
Electoral vote	146 / 256	80 / 256	30 / 256
Percentage	57.03%	31.25%	11.72%
President before election
None
Elected President
Emilio Aguinaldo
Magdalo

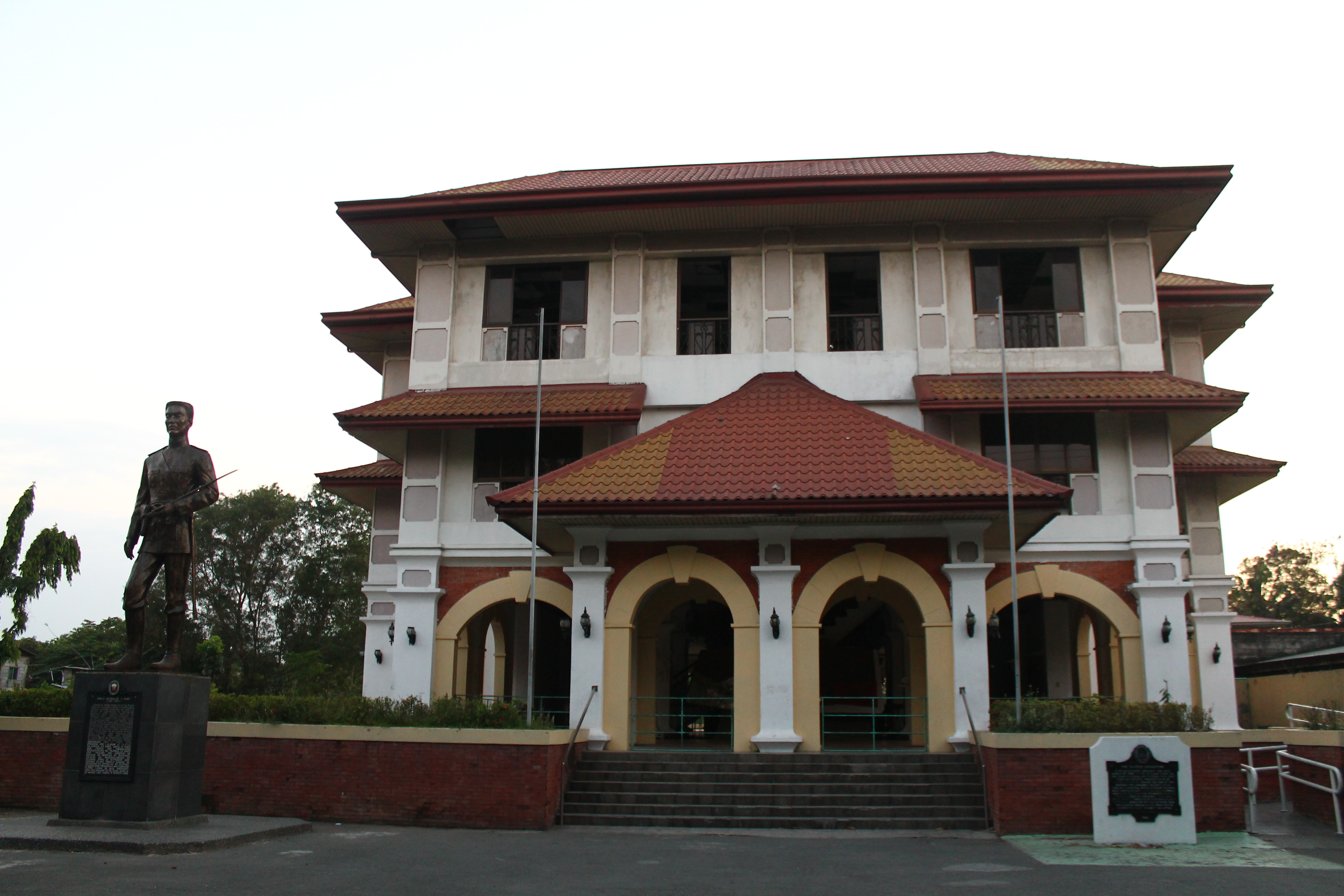
Site of the Tejeros Convention in present-day Rosario, Cavite, which was formerly part of San Francisco de Malabon

The Tejeros Convention (Spanish: Convención de Tejeros; Tagalog: Kapulungan sa Tejeros), also referred to as the Tejeros Assembly or Tejeros Congress, was a meeting held on March 22, 1897, in San Francisco de Malabon (now General Trias), Cavite, Philippines. This gathering brought together factions of the Katipunan, namely Magdiwang and Magdalo, and led to the establishment of a new revolutionary government that took over leadership of the Philippine Revolution, replacing the Katipunan. It followed the earlier Imus Assembly. Filipino historians regard this event as the first presidential and vice presidential elections in Philippine history, although only Katipuneros (members of the Katipunan) participated, not the general public.

== Convention ==
=== Purpose ===
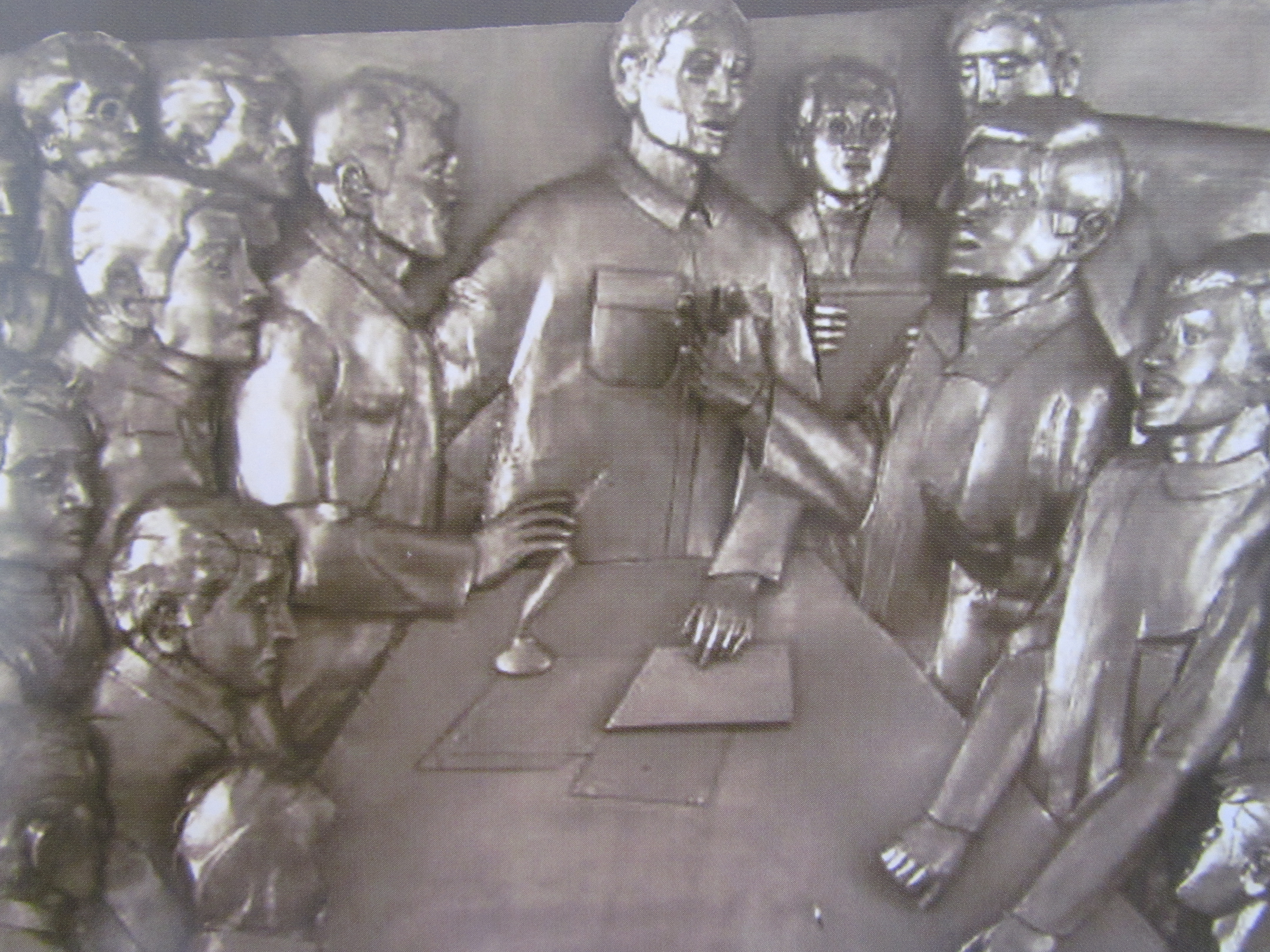
Tejeros Convention Mural, Municipality of Rosario, Cavite.

The revolutionary leaders convened the assembly at a friar estate in Tejeros, originally with the intent of discussing the defense of Cavite against Spanish forces, as Governor General Camilo de Polavieja had regained much of the province. However, the meeting shifted focus from defense to an election aimed at deciding the leadership of the revolutionary movement. This election sought to resolve the governance issues within the Katipunan and the broader revolutionary effort, which were fueling tensions between the Magdalo and Magdiwang factions in Cavite. It also aimed to bypass the existing Supreme Council of the Katipunan, led by Andrés Bonifacio, the "Supremo" (or Pangulo), who had been invited to Cavite months earlier to mediate the conflict and had sided with the Magdiwang. Bonifacio and his allies in the Magdiwang faction argued that the Katipunan already functioned as a government, while the Magdalo faction and some Magdiwang sympathizers believed the need for a new government was urgent.

Amid the discussions, Severino de las Alas raised questions about the nature of the Katipunan, wondering if it resembled a democracy or a monarchy, given its lack of formal government structure. Bonifacio, in defense, argued that the Katipunan was a republican and democratic entity. He emphasized that all members were united against Spanish rule to establish a free and sovereign government, grounded in the principles of liberty, equality, and fraternity. He argued that the Katipunan's government represented the sovereignty of the people, rather than that of a single leader or a small elite.

The assembly became contentious as debates continued throughout the day, culminating in a disruption when the Magdalo side disparaged the revolutionary efforts, likening them to those of bandits or wild animals. This insult was taken personally by Bonifacio's Magdiwang supporters. After some chaos, the situation was brought under control, and though some advocated for adjourning the convention, Bonifacio insisted on continuing. Jacinto Lumbreras, the Magdiwang chairman, who had been presiding over the assembly, then stepped down, suggesting that Bonifacio, as the "father of the Katipunan and the Revolution," should take over the chairmanship if they were to discuss replacing the existing government. Bonifacio reluctantly accepted the role of chairman, despite concerns about the absence of officials and representatives from other provinces and Katipunan councils. However, he bowed to the majority's wishes and proceeded with the elections.

=== Election results ===
Bonifacio presided over the election as chairman of the convention. He secured the unanimous approval of the assembly that the decisions would not be questioned, and the winners be respected regardless of their stations in life or educational attainment.

Candidate	Party	Votes	%
Emilio Aguinaldo	Magdalo	146	57.03
Andrés Bonifacio	Katipunan Supreme Council, Magdiwang ally	80	31.25
Mariano Trias	Magdiwang	30	11.72
Total		256	100.00
Valid votes		256	100.00
Invalid/blank votes		0	0.00
Total votes		256	100.00
Registered voters/turnout		256	100.00

The results of the election:

Position	Name	Faction
President	Emilio Aguinaldo	Magdalo
Vice-president	Mariano Trías	Magdiwang
Captain-general	Artemio Ricarte	Magdiwang
Director of war	Emiliano Riego de Dios	Magdiwang
Director of the interior	Andrés Bonifacio	Katipunan Supreme Council, Magdiwang ally

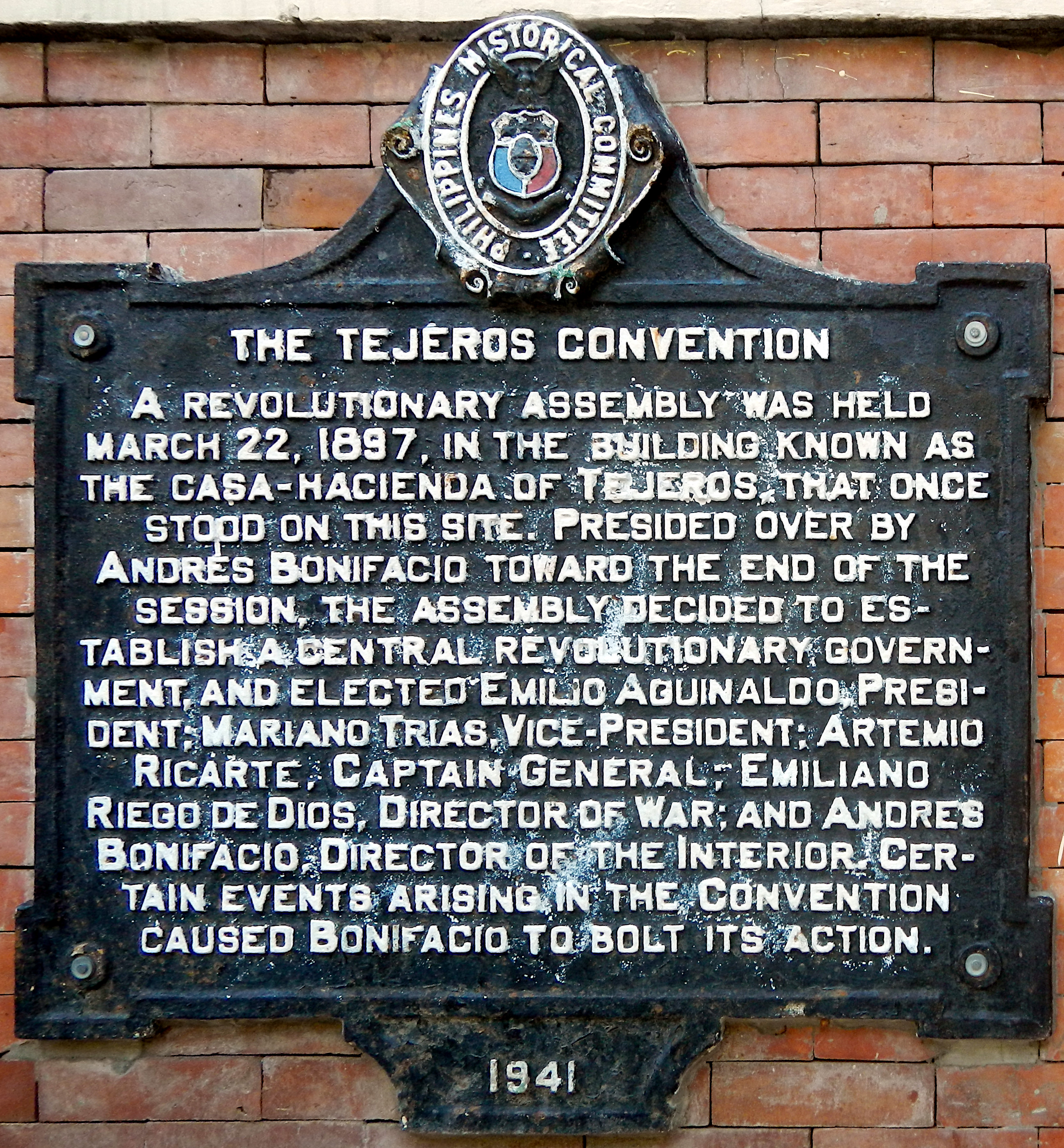
Historical marker installed in 1941 at the site of the convention in Rosario, Cavite

After Aguinaldo was elected president, Severino de las Alas of Magdiwang proposed that Bonifacio automatically be considered vice president since he had received the second highest number of votes. Nobody seconded or contested the motion, so Bonifacio as chairman ruled that the elections should continue. Mariano Trias of Magdiwang was then elected vice president over Mariano Alvarez, the president of Magdiwang, and Bonifacio. Artemio Ricarte of Magdiwang was then elected Captain-General over Santiago Alvarez (son of Mariano), also of Magdiwang. Ricarte, aka "General Vibora", tried to demur and concede to Alvarez aka "General Apoy", but Alvarez himself insisted that he accept it and vouched for him. Then Baldomero Aguinaldo, cousin of Emilio and president of Magdalo, suggested that people stand in groups to make the voting faster so they could finish before it got too dark. This was followed, and Emiliano Riego de Dios of Magdiwang was elected Director of War over Santiago Alvarez and Ariston Villanueva of Magdiwang and Daniel Tirona of Magdalo. Finally, Bonifacio was elected Director of the Interior over Mariano Alvarez.

However, after Bonifacio was elected, Daniel Tirona loudly objected that the post should not be occupied by a person without a lawyer's diploma. He instead nominated a lawyer, Jose del Rosario (of Magdiwang), as qualified for the suitable position. Bonifacio was greatly embarrassed, and demanded that Tirona retract the remark and apologize to the assembly. When Tirona made to leave instead, Bonifacio drew a pistol and was about to fire at Tirona, but stopped when Ricarte tried to disarm him. Bonifacio then invoked his role as the chairman of the assembly and the supreme president of the Katipunan and declared all proceedings that day to be null and void, and left with his supporters.

=== Allegations of fraud ===
In addition to Bonifacio's statement voiding the outcome, the probity of the election held was questioned, with allegations that many ballots distributed were already filled out and that the voters had not done this themselves.

In their memoirs, Santiago Álvarez and Gregoria de Jesús both alleged that many ballots were already filled out before being distributed, and Guillermo Masangkay contended there were more ballots prepared than voters present. Álvarez writes that Bonifacio had been warned by a Cavite leader Diego Mojica of the rigged ballots before the votes were canvassed, but he had done nothing.

== Post-convention events ==
Historical markers

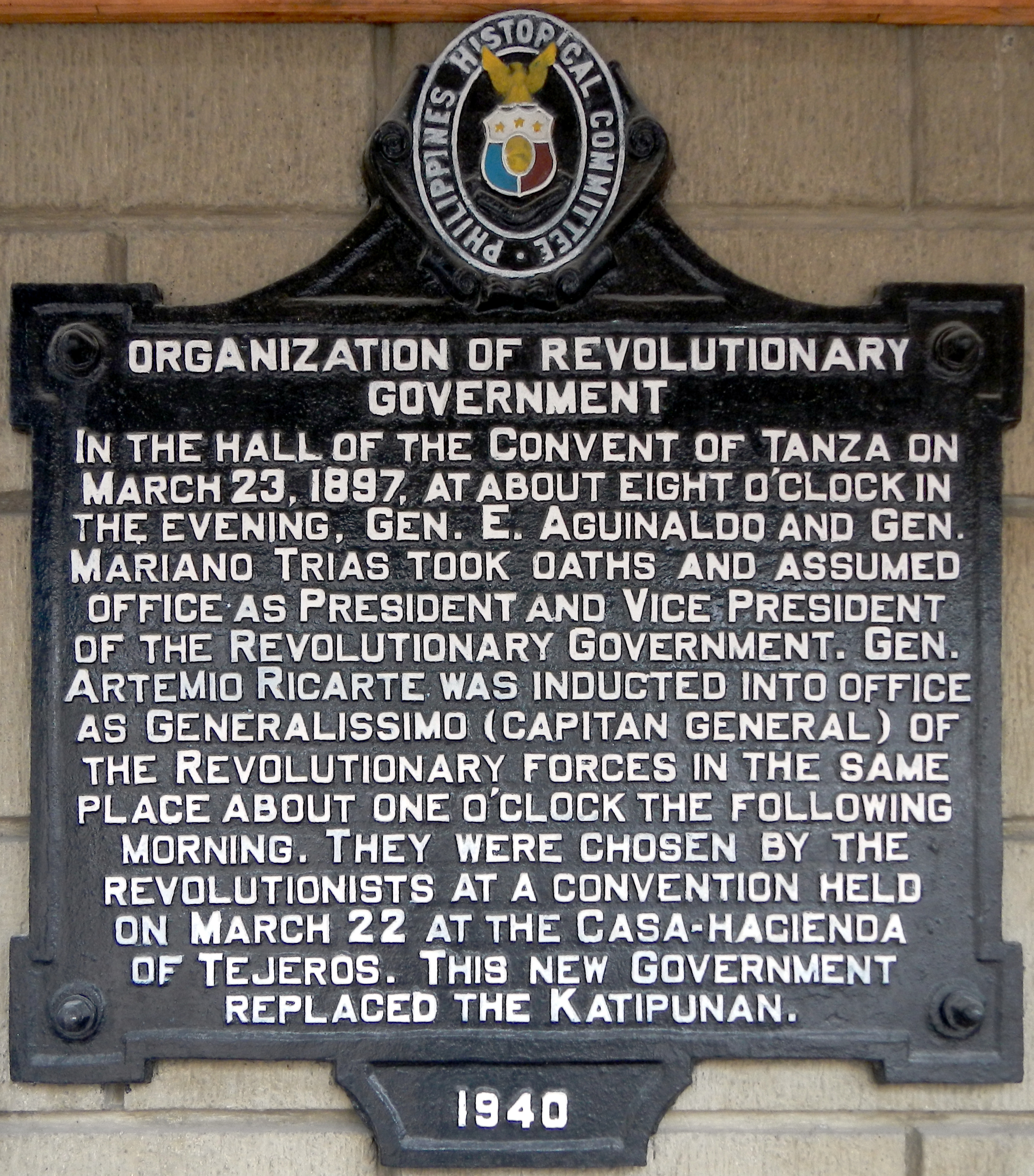
1940 Philippines Historical Committee marker installed at the facade of the Tanza Convent

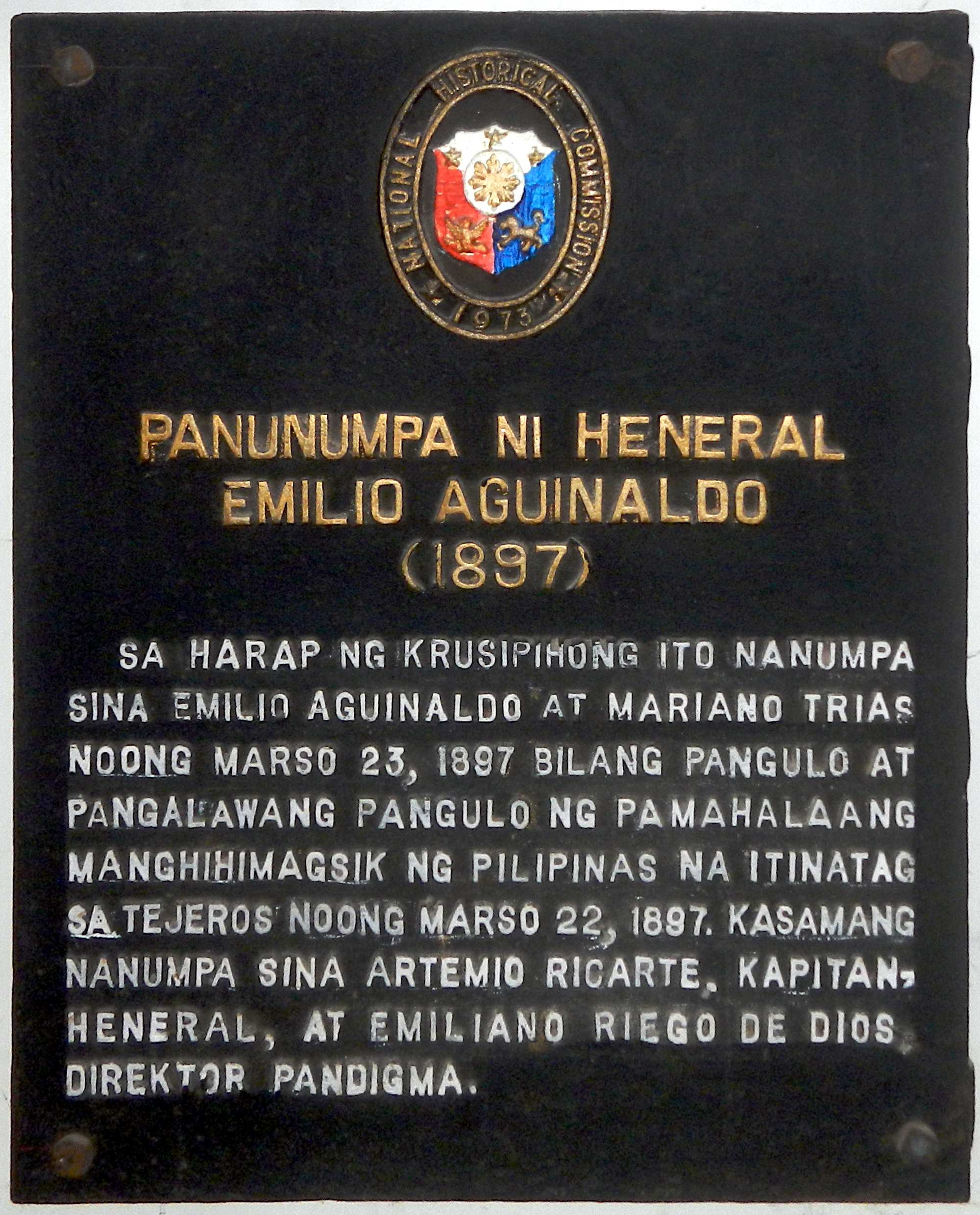
1973 National Historical Commission marker installed at the room inside the Tanza Convent where the oath-taking of Aguinaldo and others took place

Emilio Aguinaldo was not present at the convention, but was at a military front at Pasong Santol, a barrio of Dasmariñas, Cavite. He was notified of his election to the Presidency the following day, and his elder brother, Crispulo Aguinaldo, persuaded him to travel to take the oath of office. Leaving Crispulo in command, Aguinaldo traveled to Santa Cruz de Malabon (now Tanza, Cavite), where he and the others elected, with the exception of Bonifacio, took their oath of office. Crispulo Aguinaldo was among those killed in the Battle of Pasong Santol on March 24, 1897, which ended with a Spanish victory. Aguinaldo surreptitiously took his oath of office as president in a chapel officiated by a Catholic priest, Cenon Villafranca, who was under the authority of the Roman pope. According to Gen. Santiago Álvarez, guards were posted outside with strict instructions not to let in any unwanted partisan from the Magdiwang faction while the oath-taking took place. Artemio Ricarte also took his office "with great reluctance" and made a declaration that "dirty or shady" practices in the Tejeros elections had "not been in conformity with the true will of the people."

After leaving the convention, Bonifacio met on March 28 with 45 of his followers. Convinced that the election at the convention had been invalid, they drew up a document titled Acta de Tejeros giving their reasons for having rejected the convention results. They then proceeded to Naik and drew up another document on April 19, sometimes referred to as the Naic Military Agreement, repudiating the insurgent government established at Tejeros.

Aguinaldo did not at first fully or openly assume the office of president, though he had secretly taken the oath of office, and first managed to secure support among Magdalo and Magdiwang alike. He sent a delegation to contact the increasingly isolated Bonifacio and persuade him to cooperate. The delegation was able to contact Bonifacio, but was unable to persuade him as he resolved to move out of the province. Some Magdiwang leaders, led by Pio del Pilar and Mariano Alvarez, eventually recanted their previous insistence that the result of the Tejeros convention was null and void, thereby recognizing the validity of the elected leaders there, and some others later occupying the five vacant positions upon appointment from Aguinaldo. The newly appointed officials took their oath of office on April 24, 1897, when Aguinaldo fully and openly assumed the office of president. On the same day, he convened the first session of the cabinet and issued an official circular informing the town presidents of all municipalities that he was duly elected by the convention and was assuming his position as president.

Several complaints against Bonifacio, notably from Severino de las Alas and Jose Coronel, were then presented to Aguinaldo. He then ordered Bonifacio's arrest before he could leave Cavite, and dispatched a force to Bonifacio's camp at Limbon, Indang. The unsuspecting Bonifacio received them cordially on the 25th, but was arrested along with his brother Procopio early the next day. In the resulting exchange of gunfire and scuffles, despite Bonifacio ordering his men not to fight and not putting up resistance himself, he was wounded and his other sibling, Ciriaco, was killed. Andres and Procopio Bonifacio were tried on charges of treason by members of the war council of Aguinaldo's government. On May 10, 1897, the brothers were executed.

== Finalized government ==
Tejeros Revolutionary Government: Philippine Republic (March 1897) Republic of the Philippines (April 1897) Government of All Tagalogs (May 1897)
- Pamahalaang Panghimagsikan ng Tejeros: Republica Filipina (March 1897); Republica de Filipinas (April 1897); Pamahalaan ng Sangkatagalugan (May 1897)
- Flag

Overview
- Established: March 22, 1897
- Dissolved: November 1, 1897
- State: Philippines
- Leader: President
- Main organ: Cabinet
- Headquarters: San Francisco de Malabon, Cavite

Official Cabinet of the Tejeros Revolutionary Government
Position	Name	Term	Political Faction
President	Emilio Aguinaldo	April 24, 1897 [ oath of office taken March 23 ] - November 1, 1897	Magdalo
Vice-president	Mariano Trías	April 24, 1897 [ oath of office taken March 23 ] - November 1, 1897	Magdiwang
Captain-General	Artemio Ricarte	April 24, 1897 [ oath of office taken March 23 ] - November 1, 1897	Magdiwang
Director of War	Emiliano Riego de Dios	April 24, 1897 [ oath of office taken March 23 ] - November 1, 1897	Magdiwang
Director of State	Jacinto Lumbreras	April 24, 1897 - November 1, 1897	Magdiwang
Director of Finance	Baldomero Aguinaldo	April 24, 1897 - November 1, 1897	Magdalo
Director of Welfare	Mariano Alvarez	April 24, 1897 - November 1, 1897	Magdiwang
Director of Justice	Severino de las Alas	April 24, 1897 - November 1, 1897	Magdiwang
Director of the Interior	Pascual Alvarez	April 24, 1897 - November 1, 1897	Magdiwang

The finalized revolutionary government lasted from April 24, 1897, to November 1 of the same year, when it was replaced by the "Republic of the Philippines" (Republica de Filipinas), commonly known today as the "Republic of Biak-na-Bato", which was led by some of the same people including Aguinaldo as president. During its tenure, the whole of Cavite fell under Spanish control again and Aguinaldo retreated to Bulacan.

While today Aguinaldo is considered by the Philippine government and conventional Philippine historiography to be the first President of the Philippines, this is not based on his office established at Tejeros but upon his being the president of the later "First Philippine Republic" or "Malolos Republic" in 1899.

Unlike the aforementioned later governments, Filipino historians do not have a standardized name for the earliest revolutionary government headed by Aguinaldo, the Tejeros government. During the elections, the name Republica Filipina (Philippine Republic, also the formal name of the "First Republic" of 1899) was mentioned. After Aguinaldo had secured his position among the Magdalo and Magdiwang alike, it was proclaimed and named in documents as Republica de Filipinas (Republic of the Philippines, akin to the official name of the present-day Philippine government). During Bonifacio's trial, the court referred to their government as the Pamahalaan ng Sangkatagalugan (roughly "Government of all Tagalogs" or "Government of the [whole] Tagalog Nation/People"). This last term is akin to the earlier terms Haring Bayang Katagalugan or Republika ng Katagalugan ("Sovereign Tagalog Nation/People" or "Republic of the Tagalog Nation/People", called in Spanish sources Republica Tagala) which describes Bonifacio's concept of a Philippine nation and revolutionary government spanning the entire archipelago, with "Tagalog" serving as a synonym/replacement for "Filipino", as realized through the Katipunan with him as president ("Pangulo ng Haring Bayan"), and predating but superseded by Tejeros.
