= Dino Reyes Chua =

Vice Mayor of Noveleta, Cavite

The Honorable Dino Reyes Chua

Vice Mayor of Noveleta
- Incumbent
- Assumed office June 30, 2025
- Preceded by: Arlynn Torres

Mayor of Noveleta
- In office June 30, 2016 – June 30, 2025
- Preceded by: Enrico Alvarez
- Succeeded by: Davey Reyes Chua

Member of the Cavite Provincial Board from the 1st district
- In office June 30, 2010 – June 30, 2016
- Preceded by: Romel Enriquez
- Succeeded by: Davey Reyes Chua

Personal details
- Born: Dino Carlo Reyes Chua; September 28, 1980 (age 46) Cavite City, Cavite, Philippines
- Party: Lakas (2012–2015; 2024–present); Magdalo (local party; 2009–present)
- Other political affiliations: UNA (2015–2018; 2021–2024); Nacionalista (2009–2012; 2018–2021)
- Spouse: Azenith Paredes
- Domestic partner: Bernice Angeles
- Children: 2
- Education: De La Salle University; San Beda College of Law; Stanford University

Dino Carlo Reyes Chua (born September 28, 1980) is a Filipino businessman and politician and the former mayor and current vice mayor of Noveleta, Cavite. He is the president of SkyJet Airlines, and also the owner of El Palacio Resort in Coastal Bay, Noveleta, Cavite and One Greenbelt Hotel in Ayala Center, Makati. He is also the president of The Dome Hotels & Resorts with branches in Caylabne Bay, Puerto Princesa City, El Nido, Palawan and soon in Siargao and Boracay. In 2016, he was elected as the youngest mayor of Noveleta, Cavite at the age of 35. In 2004, he became the youngest Vice Mayor of Cavite City at the age of 23. In 2010, he also served as No. 1 Provincial Board Member representing the 1st Congressional District of Cavite (Cavite City, Kawit, Noveleta, Rosario). He also became one of the youngest majority leaders of Cavite Province at the age of 29. He often assumes the position of Acting Vice Governor whenever the Governor or Vice Governor is on-leave.

== Biography and career ==
Chua is the eldest son of Danilo Chua (a businessman and philanthropist) and Corazon Reyes, both natives of Cavite province. Chua traced his political roots from the Reyes family being the great-grandson of former Congressman Augusto Reyes Sr., a lawyer who later became Justice during the American regime before he was elected as Representative of Cavite Province in the 1925 Congress. His first cousin, Augusto "GuGu" Reyes III also served as Cavite City Councilor up to 1998. His younger brother, Denver Chua, was also elected as Cavite City Mayor in the May 2022 elections. In 2013, his other brother Davey Reyes Chua served as Vice Mayor of Noveleta, Cavite and was also elected as provincial board member of the First District of Cavite.

Chua finished his high school at San Sebastian College de Cavite in 1996 and graduated his bachelor's degree in Business Administration from De La Salle University -CSB in Taft Avenue, Manila. He also earned units of Bachelor of Law at San Beda College of Law. He also finished his Executive Education at Stanford University, California, U.S.A. He also completed the Municipal Leadership & Governance Program at University of the Philippines. He was awarded as one of the Ten Outstanding Young Men of the Philippines (TOYM Awards) in 2019 and awarded as Most Outstanding Mayor in 2018 and Best Mayor of the Year by Asia Leaders Award in 2020.

After his graduation from college, Chua became the youngest Vice Mayor of Cavite City at the age of 23. He first entered politics when he was elected as the Topnotch City Councilor of Cavite City in the 2004 elections. In that election, he received the highest number of votes ever cast in the history of Cavite City. He became one of the youngest Vice Mayors who served in the whole country. He also topped the 2010 Provincial elections, not only in his district but in the whole province of Cavite, making him the No. 1 Provincial Board Member or Senior Board Member of Cavite Province. He often assumed the position of Acting Vice-Governor and Presiding Officer while the Governor or the Vice-Governor of the province was on leave. In May 2016, Chua ran for Mayor of Noveleta, Cavite and won as the newly elected Mayor of Noveleta with a margin of almost 10,000 votes over his rival, making it the highest margin in the history of the Noveleta elections.

== Business ==
Dino Reyes-Chua is also a businessman and the president of SkyJet Airlines (Magnum Air, Inc.), the country's first boutique airline company. SkyJet launched the first and only jet service to unique island destinations like Batanes (Basco), direct flights to Siargao Island, daily flights to Coron in Palawan (Busuanga) and Boracay (Caticlan). He is also the president and owner of El Palacio Hotel in Coastal Bay, Noveleta, Cavite City. He is also the Owner and Founder of One Greenbelt Hotel, located in Ayala Center, Makati (across Greenbelt Mall). His latest venture is serving as the president and CEO of The Dome Hotels & Resorts, a hotel chain with branches in Caylabne Bay, Ternate, Cavite, Puerto Prinsesa City, El Nido, Palawan, and upcoming branches in Siargao & Boracay.

At the age of 21, he founded Cavite's first FM radio station, 91.9 The Bomb FM, in 2002. He is also the co-founder of another FM radio station in Metro Manila, Blazin' 105.9 FM (which is now 105.9 True FM in partnership with TV5 Network, Inc.). During his younger days, He also became the franchise owner of Padis Point Restaurant and Bar in Cavite City, co-owner of Culture Club in Eastwood City, Libis, co-owner of ClubV Ultimate bar in Mile Long, Makati, executive producer of Delta Records Corp. and developer/President of DeltaLand Realty Corporation. Today, He is also a co-owner of Algeria Restaurant in Singapore, Bulalo World Food Chain with 50 branches nationwide, King Sisig (40 branches nationwide), and Butcher Boy in Makati City with Singaporean Michelin Star Chef Andrew Walsh.

== Affiliations ==
Chua is also the founder of Manny Pacquiao's Party-list, the PBA Partylist also known as Pwersa ng Bayaning Atleta, which focuses on the empowerment of youth and sports development in the Philippines. The PBA party list also elected and won a seat in the 15th Congress to represent the sports sector.

Chua is well-affiliated with various non-governmental organizations (NGOs), having served as the past president of Cavite "Magiting" Jaycees, charter president of the Rotary Club of Cavite Central, charter president of the Kiwanis Club of Noveleta, and a member of the Freemason Bagong Buhay Lodge 17. He is also a member of Lex Leonum Fraternitas, a law-based fraternity in San Beda College of Law.

In 2010, he was elected as the Topnotch Provincial Board Member of Cavite representing the 1st District, making him the youngest elected provincial official and member of Sangguniang Panlalawigan at the age of 29. He is the majority floor leader and the chairman of the powerful committee on rules and the committee on public works.

== See also ==
- Partido Magdalo
- Jerry Codiñera of PBA Partylist
