= Santiago Álvarez (writer) =

Spanish writer, musician and theatre practitioner

Santiago Álvarez is a Spanish writer, musician and theatre practitioner. He was born in Murcia in 1973. He has published a number of short stories and two novels: La Ciudad de la Memoria (2015) and El Jardín de Cartón (2016). He has also written, directed and acted in stage plays and musicals, and recorded several albums. He is a specialist in the history of Valencia. He is also regarded as the first tutor in Spain of Scrivener, the software programme for writers.
