= Santiago Álvarez (general) =

Revolutionary general

Santiago Virata Álvarez
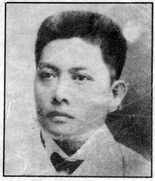
- General Santiago Alvarez
- Born: Santiago Álvarez y Virata; July 25, 1872; Imus, Cavite, Captaincy General of the Philippines
- Died: October 30, 1930 (aged 58); San Pablo, Laguna, Philippine Islands
- Burial place: Noveleta Public Cemetery; Noveleta, Cavite
- Relatives: Mariano Álvarez (Father); Pascual Alvarez (Cousin)
- Military career
- Allegiance: First Philippine Republic; Republic of Biak-na-Bato; Katipunan (Magdiwang)
- Branch: Philippine Revolutionary Army
- Service years: 1896–1901
- Rank: Brigadier General
- Nickname: Spanish: Rayo de Fuego / Tagalog: Kidlat ng Apoy
- Conflicts: Philippine Revolution: Battle of Noveleta; Battle of Dalahican; Philippine–American War

Santiago Virata Álvarez (Spanish: [sanˈtjaɣo ˈalβaɾes]; born Santiago Álvarez y Virata; July 25, 1872 – October 30, 1930) was a revolutionary general and a founder and honorary president of the first directorate of the short-lived earlier Partido Nacionalista which existed from 1901 to 1907. Also known as Kidlat ng Apoy (En: Lightning of Fire; Fiery Lightning) because of his inflamed bravery and dedication as commander of Cavite's famous battles (particularly that in Dalahican), he was celebrated in present-day Cavite City as the Hero of the Battle of Dalahican.

== Early life ==
A native of Imus, Cavite, Santiago was the eldest child of revolutionary general Mariano Alvarez (1818–1924) and Nicolasa Virata. After his birth, his family immediately moved to Tierra Alta, Cavite (present-day Noveleta) where he acquired his early education at age seven under Sr. Antonio Dacon. He was later transferred to another private school in Cavite Nuevo (present-day Cavite City) where he was taught by Don Ignacio Vilocillo. Since his parents wanted him to become a teacher, he was sent to Manila and enrolled at a school situated along Camba Street in Tondo, Manila and was headed by Don Macario Hernández. However, his academic endeavors were interrupted by the revolution in 1896. After the revolution, he enrolled at the University of Santo Tomas but later transferred to the Colegio de San Juan de Letran where he obtained a Bachelor of Arts. He then took up law at the Liceo de Manila.

== Personal life ==
Santiago married Maria Paz Granados of Tanza, Cavite with whom he had ten children - Marta, Magdalena, Gabriel, Pacita, Numeriano, Egmidio, Rosendo, Virginia, Amalia, and Fidel.

== Philippine Revolution ==
Prior to the outbreak of the revolution, Santiago was already a delegado general of the provincial council of the Katipunan in Cavite. He became captain general and later, commander-in-chief, of the Magdiwang forces and valiantly fought the Spaniards from 1896 to 1897. With his father, Mariano Álvarez, and cousin, General Pascual Álvarez, they liberated Noveleta from the Spaniards on August 31, 1896. A notable combatant, Santiago displayed heroism and bravery in various battles within Noveleta, specifically in the towns of Naic, Maragondon, Magallanes, Tanza, Alfonso, Silang, Imus, and Francisco de Malabon. From November 9 to 11, 1896, Alvarez won a decisive victory against General Ramon Blanco at the 36-hour Battle of Dalahican, one of the bloodiest battles at the advent of the Philippine Revolution.

Although marginalized within the ranks of the revolution with the ascendancy of a rival faction, Alvarez continued to support the cause of the revolution.

== American occupation ==
During the establishment of the American civil government in the Philippines in 1901, Alvarez assisted in the organization of the Partido Nacionalista (1901–1907), wherein he later became president of its directorate. In 1902, Governor-General William Howard Taft assigned him as presiding officer of the Junta Magna de la Comisión de la Paz (Great Council of the Peace Commission) which was formed to accelerate the rehabilitation of the country from the destruction caused by the war.

Álvarez joined in the founding of the Philippine Independent Church where he also served as one of its local leaders. He organized the Makabuhay Association in 1912 which aimed for mutual assistance and confraternity.

== Death ==
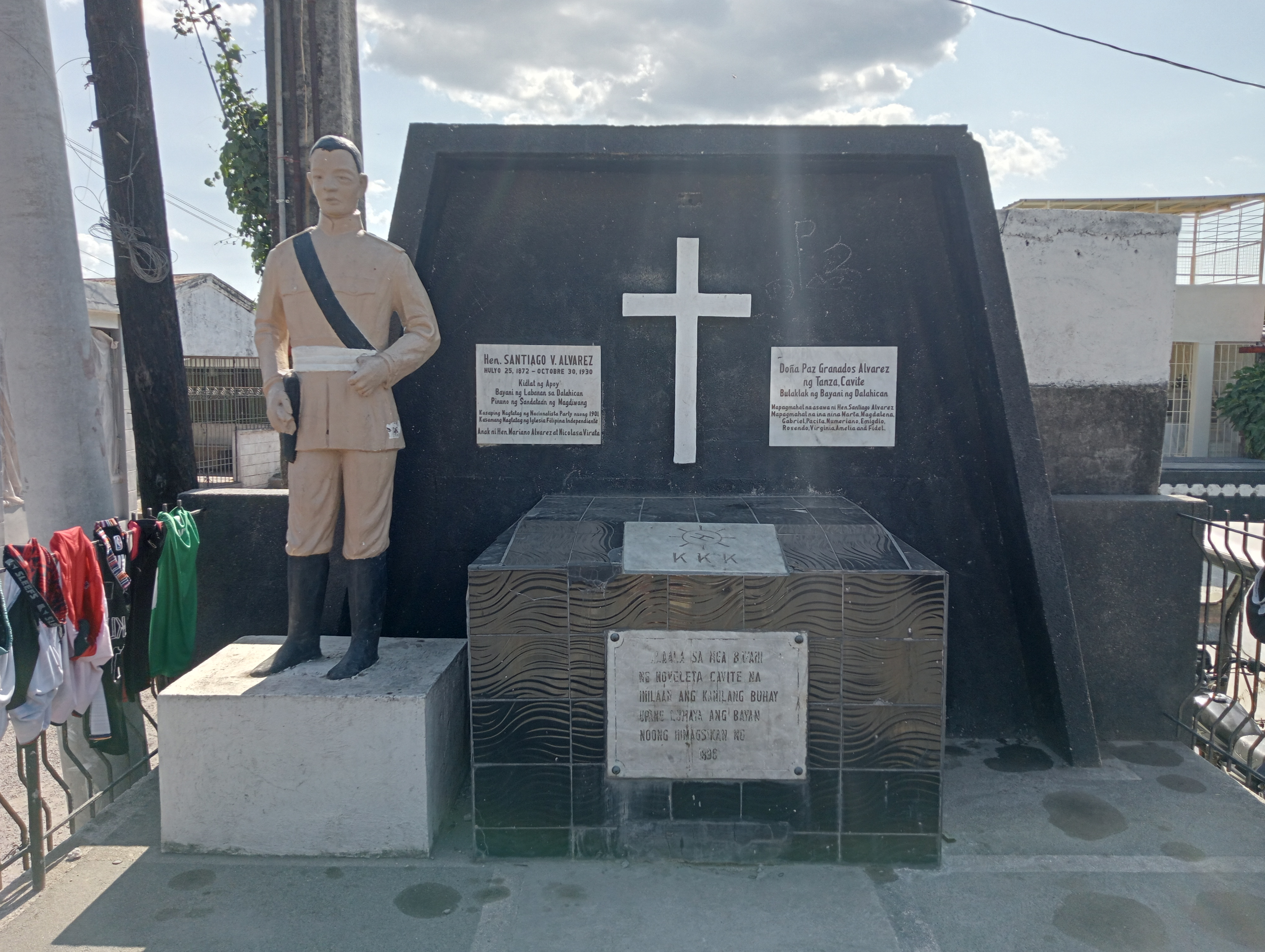
Resting place of Santiago Alvarez with his wife Ma. Paz Granados Alvarez at Noveleta, Cavite.

On October 30, 1930, at age 58, he died of paralysis in San Pablo, Laguna and was buried at the Noveleta Public Cemetery.

== In popular culture ==
- Portrayed by Mario Capalad in the 2012 film, El Presidente.
- Portrayed by Allen Edzfar in the 2013 TV series, Katipunan.

== Written works ==
- The Katipunan and the Revolution: Memoirs of a General
- Recalling the Revolution: Memoirs of a Filipino General
