= Mariano Álvarez =

Filipino revolutionary and statesman (1842–1924)

The Honorable General Mariano Álvarez
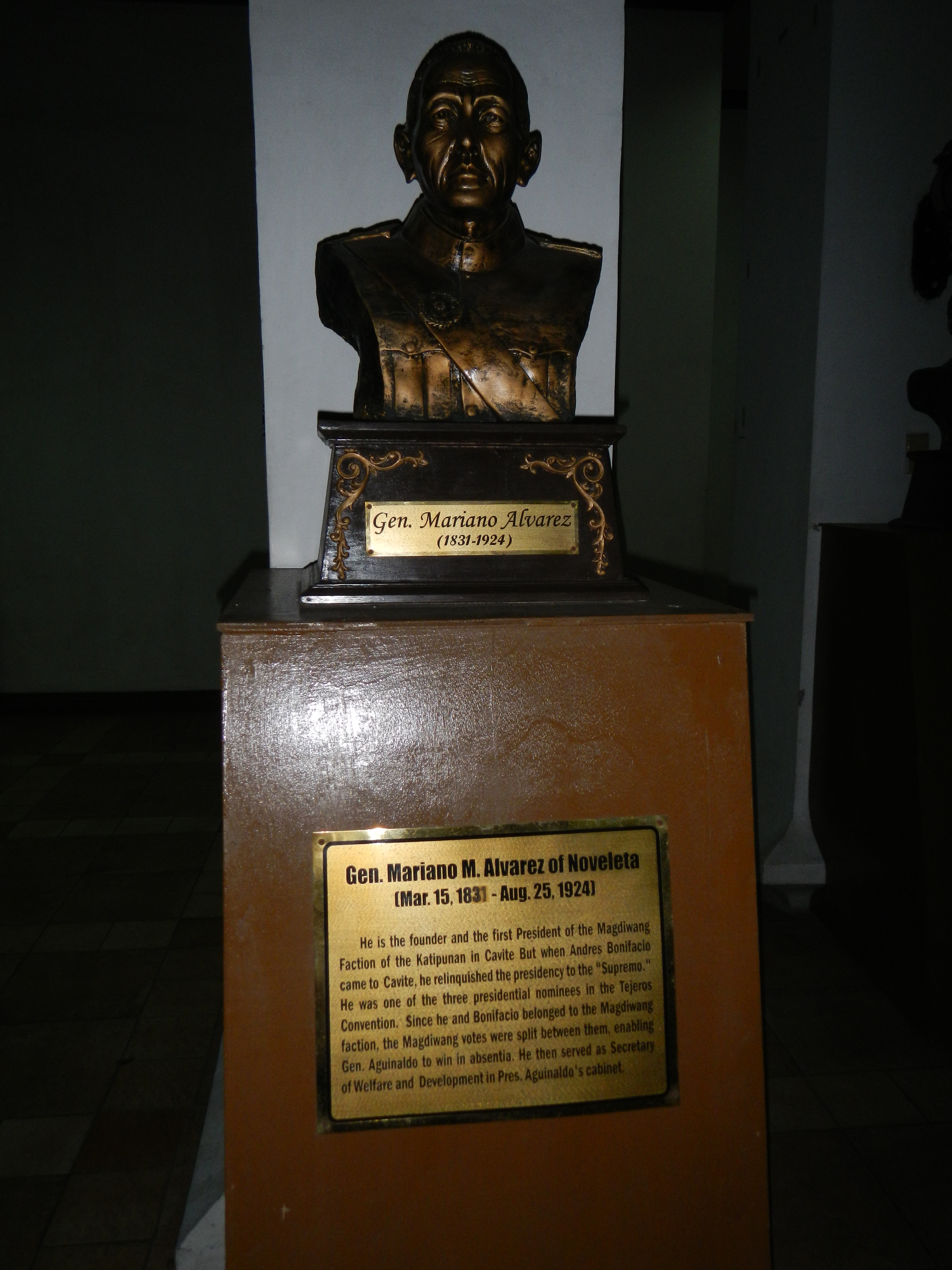
- Bust and commemorative plaque of General Álvarez

Municipal President of Noveleta
- In office 1893–1902
- Preceded by: Position established
- Succeeded by: Pascual Alvarez

Personal details
- Born: Mariano Álvarez y Malia; September 3, 1842 Tierra Alta, Cavite, Captaincy General of the Philippines, Spanish Empire
- Died: August 25, 1924 (aged 81) San Roque, Cavite, Insular Government of the Philippine Islands, United States
- Occupation: Teacher, General

Military service
- Allegiance: Katipunan
- Branch/service: Magdiwang
- Years of service: 1896–1897
- Rank: Lieutenant General
- Battles/wars: Philippine Revolution

Mariano Malia Álvarez (Spanish: [ˈmaˈɾjano ˈalβaɾes]: September 3, 1842 – August 25, 1924) was a Filipino revolutionary and statesman. He was the first Municipal President of Noveleta.

== Pre-war life ==
National historical marker installed in 2026 in General Mariano Alvarez, Cavite

Álvarez was born in Tierra Alta, Cavite to Severino Álvarez and María Malia. He received formal schooling at the San José College in Manila, and obtained a teacher's diploma. He returned to Cavite and worked as a schoolteacher in Naic and Maragondon.

In 1871, he was incarcerated and tortured by the colonial authorities after insulting a Spanish soldier. The following year, he was accused of involvement in the Cavite Mutiny and was hauled to Manila in chains for detention. Upon his eventual release, he returned to Noveleta, and in 1881, was elected gobernadorcillo before becoming capitan municipal, the new title under the Maura Law, in 1893 after getting re-elected. He held the position until the outbreak of the Philippine Revolution in 1896.

== Revolutionary general ==
Flag of the Katipunan's Magdiwang faction, led by Mariano Álvarez

Álvarez and his son Santiago were active members of the Katipunan, the anti-Spanish secret society founded by Andrés Bonifacio in 1892. Mariano was the uncle of Bonifacio's wife, Gregoria de Jesús.

In early 1896, Álvarez was elected president of the Magdiwang, one of two Katipunan branches in Cavite along with Magdalo. The two branches evolved into separate factions with their own local governments, through their provincial councils.

Álvarez helped facilitate growing membership of the Katipunan in Cavite. When the revolution started in August 1896, Bonifacio at least planned to give him overall command of all the revolutionary forces in Cavite. A draft of the appointment order survives but whether it was dispatched is uncertain.

He led Filipino forces in several battles against the Spanish army in Cavite and held the rank of general. His efforts helped liberate most towns in Cavite from Spanish control within weeks from the start of the revolt. He was recognized as the instigator of the revolution in Cavite.

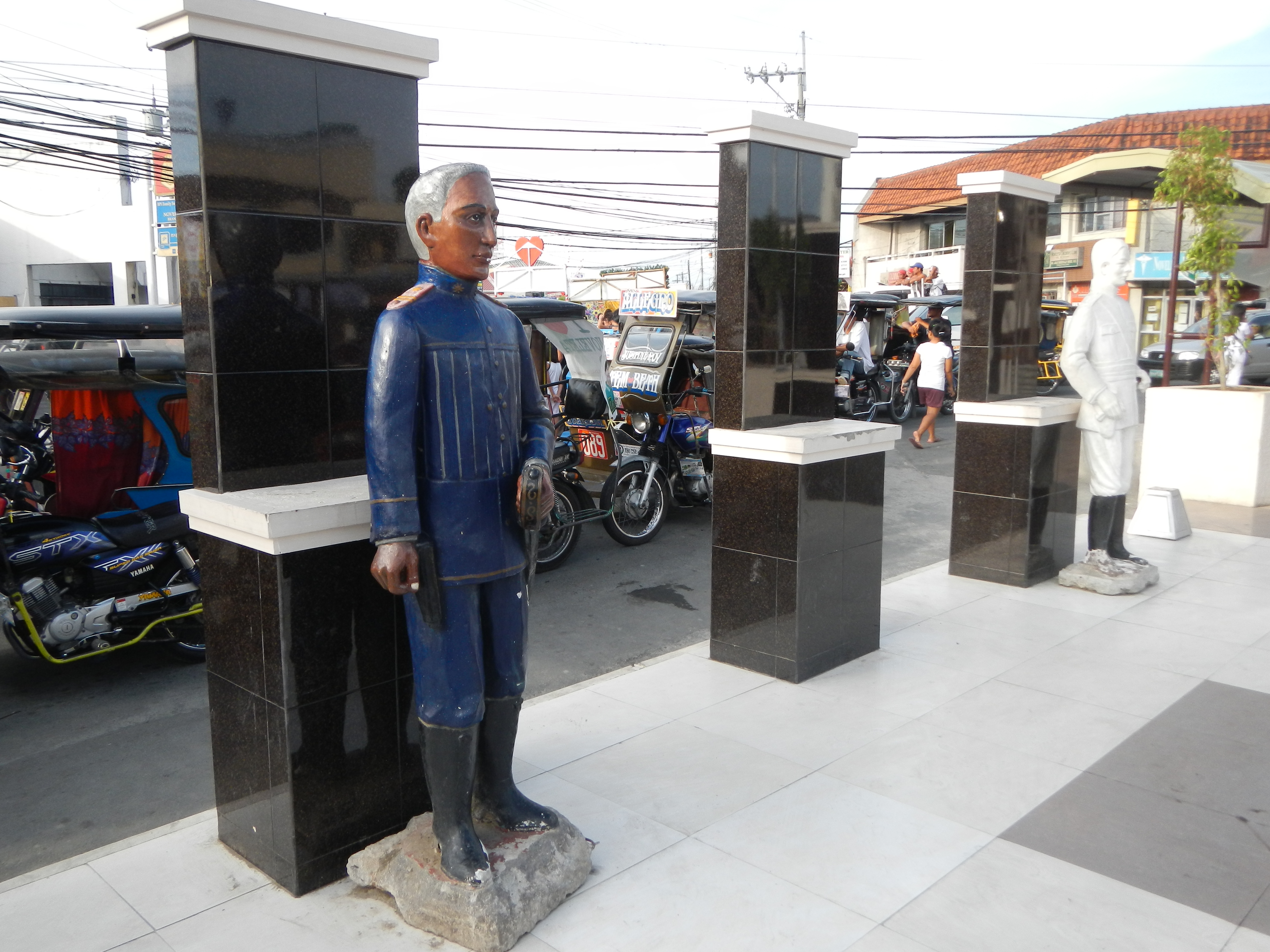
Statue of Mariano Álvarez in Noveleta

Rivalry and tension existed between the Magdiwang and Magdalo factions over jurisdiction and authority, and Álvarez, as Magdiwang head, invited Bonifacio, as Presidente Supremo ("Supreme President") of the Katipunan, to mediate over them. Bonifacio was seen as partial to the Magdiwang probably due to his kinship ties with Álvarez.

In their memoirs, Emilio Aguinaldo and other Magdalo personages claim that Bonifacio became the head of the Magdiwang, receiving the title Hari ng Bayan (“King of the People”) with Álvarez as his second-in-command. However, no documentary sources have been found substantiating these claims. Instead it has been suggested that these claims stem from a misunderstanding or misrepresentation of one of Bonifacio’s titles, Pangulo ng Haring Bayan (“President of the Sovereign Nation”). In his own memoirs, Santiago Álvarez clearly distinguishes between the Magdiwang government and the Supreme Council of the Katipunan headed by Bonifacio.

The dispute between the Magdiwang and Magdalo soon involved the issue of command of the revolution. The Magdalo called for the abolition of the Katipunan and the establishment of a revolutionary government. Bonifacio and the Magdiwang maintained the Katipunan was already their government. After losing the internal power struggle to Aguinaldo, Bonifacio was executed in 1897. Álvarez was aggrieved by Bonifacio's death, and, like Emilio Jacinto, refused to join the forces of Aguinaldo, who had then retreated to Biak-na-Bato in Bulacan.

== Personal life ==
In May 1863, he married Nicolasa Virata y del Rosario and has three children including Santiago, also a revolutionary general, was born on July 25, 1872, in Imus.

== Later life ==
The United States of America soon gained control over the Philippines following the Spanish–American War and the Philippine–American War. Álvarez affiliated himself with the pro-independence Partido Nacionalista (1901–1907) and was among the signatories of the party's constitution. He won the election as municipal president of Noveleta from 1901 to 1902.

Álvarez joined the nationalist-oriented Philippine Independent Church founded by Isabelo de los Reyes and Gregorio Aglipay in 1902. He retired to his farm following his term as municipal president, and died on August 25, 1924, from chronic rheumatism at the age of 81.

The municipality of Gen. Mariano Alvarez, Cavite, established in 1981, was named in his honor.

== In popular culture ==
- Portrayed by Ces Aldabe in the 2012 film, El Presidente.
- Portrayed by Jack Love Pacis in the 2013 TV series, Katipunan
