= Magdiwang (faction) =

Chapter of the Katipunan

- Flag of the Tagalog Republic
- Type: Political faction
- Headquarters: Noveleta, Cavite
- President: Mariano Álvarez
- Key people: Mariano Trías; Santiago Álvarez; Pascual Álvarez; Artemio Ricarte
- Parent organization: Katipunan

The Magdiwang was a faction of the Katipunan, a Philippine revolutionary organization founded by Filipino rebels in Manila in 1892 with the aim to gain independence from Spain. The Magdiwang Council was acknowledged as "the supreme organ responsible for the successful campaigns against the enemy" within Cavite.

The Magdiwang chapter was started by Mariano Álvarez, related by marriage to Andrés Bonifacio, the leader of the Katipunan. Both the Magdiwang and the Magdalo (led by Baldomero Aguinaldo, the cousin of Emilio Aguinaldo) were the two major Katipunan factions in Cavite, with the Magdiwang having control over a larger number of towns and municipalities.

When rivalry grew between the two factions, Bonifacio was invited to mediate, but he was quickly embroiled in discussions with the Magdalo, who wished to replace the Katipunan with an insurgent government. The Magdiwang initially backed Bonifacio's stance that the Katipunan already served as their government, but at the Tejeros Convention, both factions were combined into one government body under Emilio Aguinaldo.

== Magdiwang leaders ==
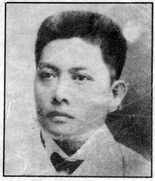
Santiago V. Álvarez the chief commander of the revolutionary forces during the battle at Dalahican 1896.

- Mariano Alvarez - President
- Lorenzo Fenoy - Vice President for Batangas
- Pascual Álvarez - Minister of the Interior
- Ariston Villanueva - Minister of War
- Ananias Diokno - Vice Minister of War of Batangas
- Mariano Trías - Minister of Welfare and Justice
- Emiliano Riego de Dios - Minister of Economic Development
- Diego Mojica - Minister of Finance
- Santiago V. Álvarez - Captain General
- Artemio Ricarte - Assistant Captain General
- Miguel Malvar - Assistant Captain General for Batangas
- Mariano Riego de Dios - General, Cavite Division
- Paciano Rizal - General, Batangas Division

== Magdiwang municipalities ==
- Cavite City (capital)
- San Roque
- La Caridad
- Noveleta
- San Francisco de Malabon (now General Trias)
- Rosario (locally referred to as Salinas)
- Sta. Cruz de Malabon (now Tanza)
- Naik
- Maragondon
- Ternate
- Magallanes
- Bailen (now General Emilio Aguinaldo)
- Indang
- Alfonso
- Mendez
- Amadeo
- Nasugbu, Batangas
- Tuy, Batangas
- Looc, Batangas

== See also ==
- Philippine Revolution
- First Philippine Republic
