= Noveleta =

Municipality in Cavite, Philippines

Noveleta Tierra Alta
- Municipality
- Municipality of Noveleta
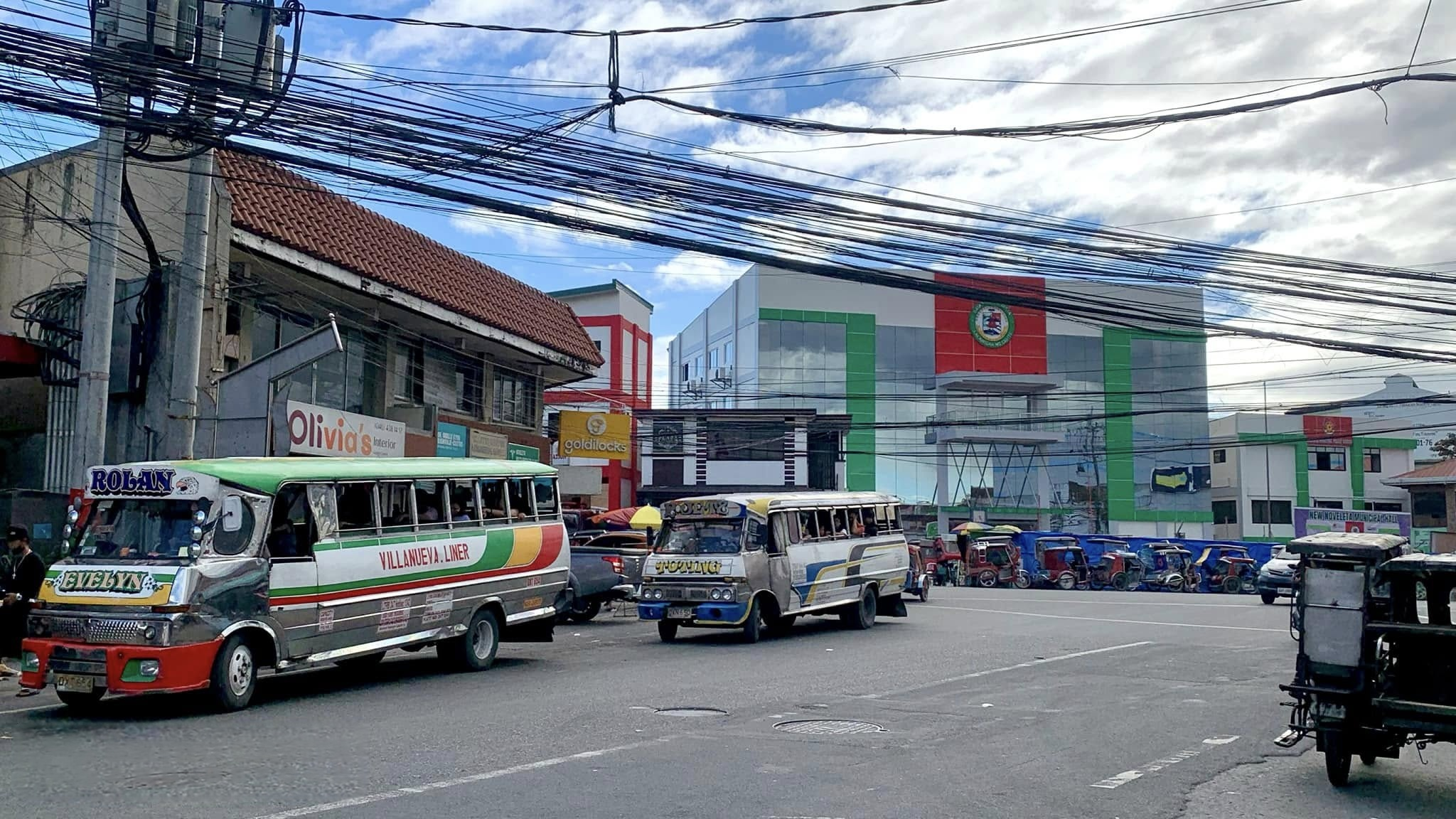
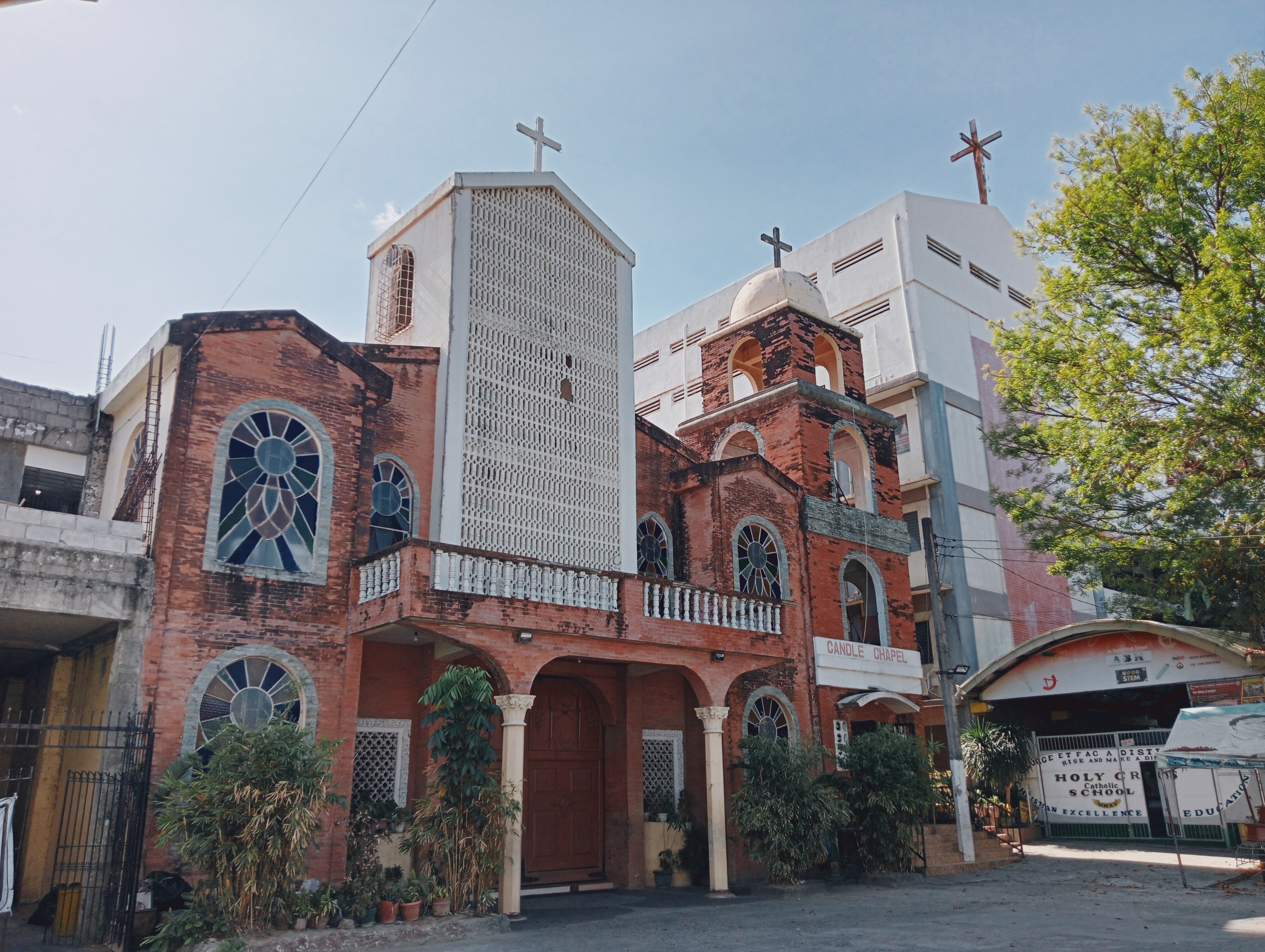
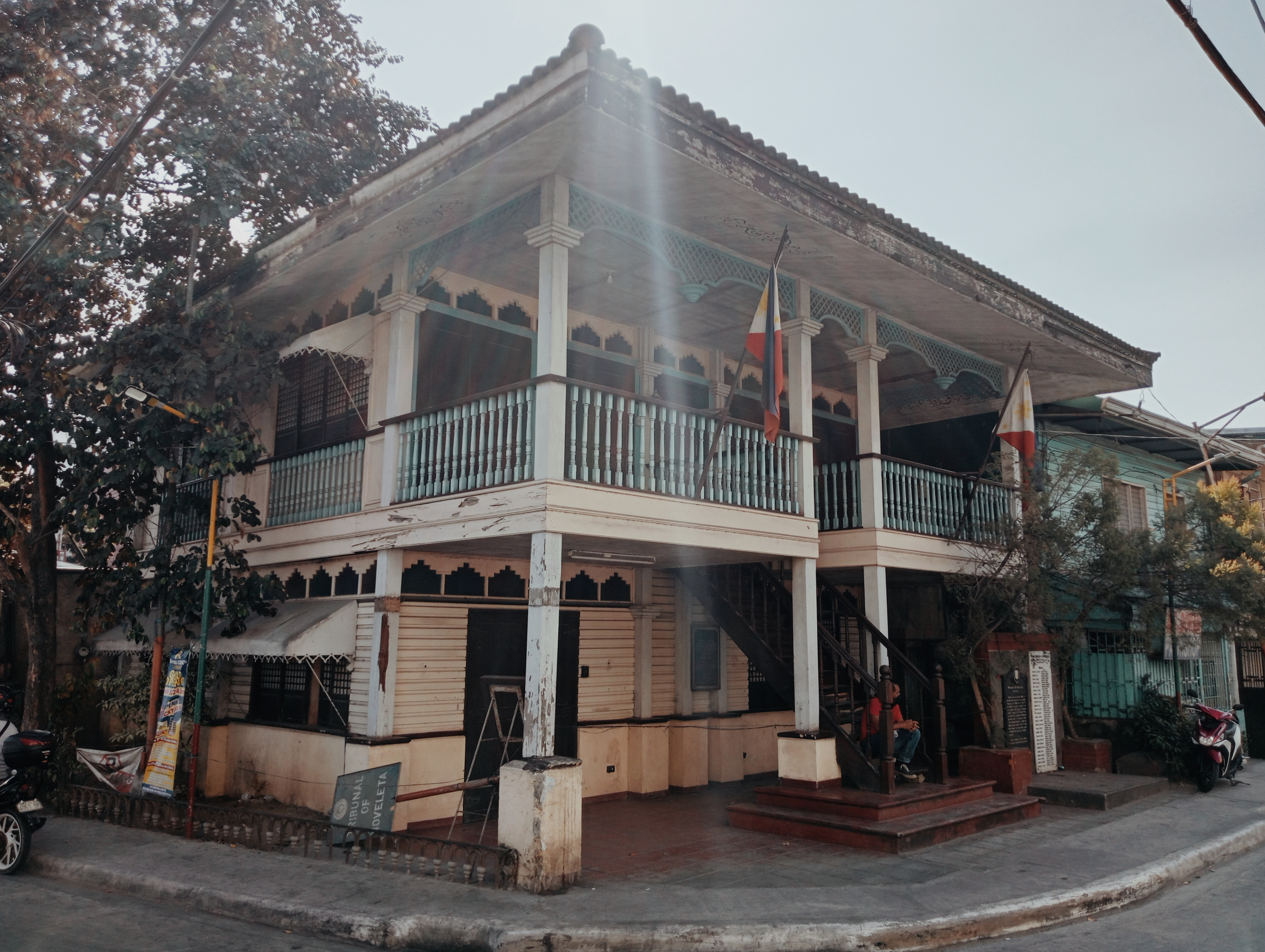
- Noveleta Town Proper Holy Cross Parish Church Noveleta Tribunal House

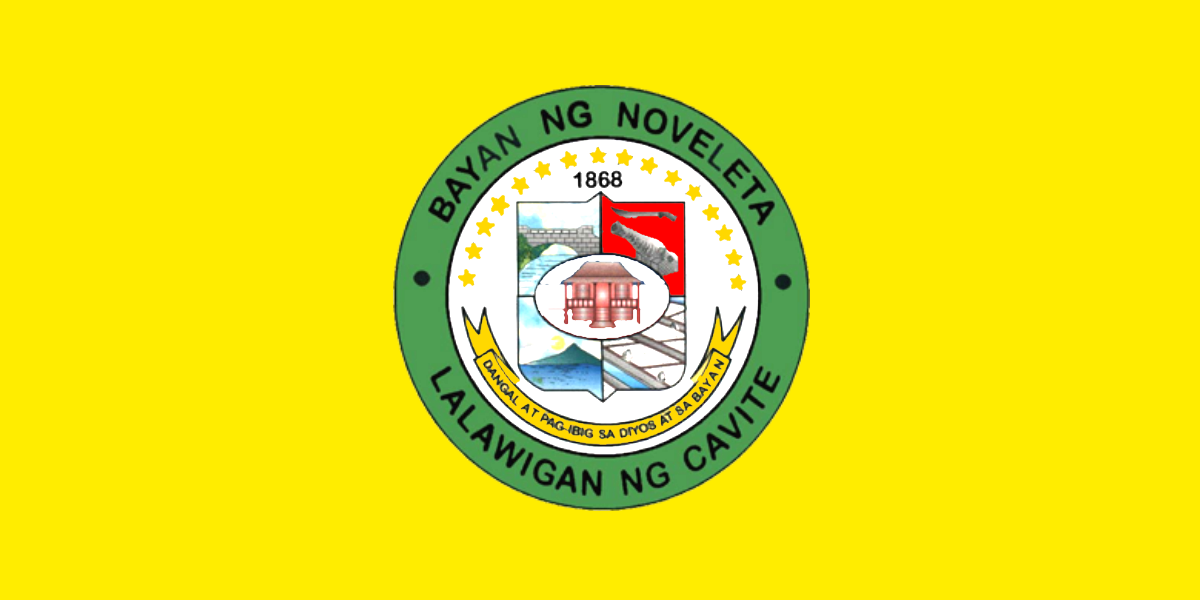
- Flag Seal
- Nickname: Filipino: Bayan ng mga Bayani; English: (Town of Heroes); Daing Capital of Cavite
- Motto: Filipino: Dangal at Pag-ibig sa Diyos at sa Bayan; English: (Honor and Love for God and for the Country)
- Anthem: Noveleta Hymn
- Map of Cavite with Noveleta highlighted
- Interactive map of Noveleta
- Location within the Philippines
- Coordinates: 14°25′41″N 120°52′52″E
- Country: Philippines
- Region: Calabarzon
- Province: Cavite
- District: 1st district
- Founded: January 5, 1868
- Founder: Gen. Jose dela Gandera y Navarro
- Named for: Violeta (according to tradition)
- Barangays: 16 (see Barangays)

Government
  - Type: Councilors
  - Mayor: Davey Reyes Chua
  - Vice Mayor: Dino Reyes Chua
  - Representative: Ramon Jolo Revilla
  - Municipal Council: Members: Jay Lontoc; Emelito Lontoc; Jeg Alix; Edwin Salud; Patrick Barzaga; Axel Enriquez; Ricky Saria; Donn Louie Alvarez
  - Electorate: 32,612 voters (2025)

Area
  - Total: 16.43 km^{2} (6.34 sq mi)
- Elevation: 1.0 m (3.3 ft)
- Highest elevation: 35 m (115 ft)
- Lowest elevation: 0 m (0 ft)

Population (2024 census)
  - Total: 46,172
  - Density: 2,810/km^{2} (7,278/sq mi)
  - Households: 13,998

Economy
  - Income class: 1st municipal income class
  - Poverty incidence: 8.13% (2023)
  - Revenue: ₱ 241 million (2024)
  - Assets: ₱ 247.5 million (2024)
  - Expenditure: ₱ 142.4 million (2024)
  - Liabilities: ₱ 80.96 million (2024)

Service provider
  - Electricity: Manila Electric Company (Meralco)
- Time zone: UTC+8 (PST)
- ZIP code: 4105
- PSGC: 0402116000
- IDD : area code: +63 (0)46
- Native languages: Tagalog
- Major religions: Roman Catholicism; Aglipayan Church; Protestantism; Islam
- Feast date: May 2 (Grand Karakol); May 3 (Town Fiesta)
- Ecclesiastical dioceses: Diocese of Imus (Roman Catholic); Diocese of Cavite (Aglipayan Church)
- Patron saint: Holy Cross (Titular Patron of both Roman Catholic and Aglipayan Church); Saint Helena of Constantinople (Roman Catholic); Nuestra Señora de la Paz y Buen Viaje (Aglipayan Church)
- Website: www.noveleta.gov.ph

Noveleta, officially the Municipality of Noveleta (Tagalog: Bayan ng Nobeleta), is a municipality in the province of Cavite, Philippines. According to the 2024 census, it has a population of 46,172 people.

== History ==
Noveleta was originally a barrio of the municipality of Kawit (Cavite El Viejo) and some part of Cavite City (Dalahican). It was made an independent pueblo on January 5, 1868, by Gen. Jose dela Gandera y Navarro. Ironically, Noveleta was referred to by the Spaniards as Tierra Alta meaning higher ground as it was more elevated than Cavite la Punta (now Cavite City). The name Noveleta is said to have originated from Nueva Isla or (new island), a term frequently used by the Spaniards, referring to the locality. In the early years of the Spanish regime visiting priests described the place as Nueva Late (New fate or Fortune). In the course of time these terms Nueva Isla and Nueva Lete evolved into Noveleta.

One legend recounts a beautiful maiden named Violeta, who was forced by her father to marry a Spanish officer despite being engaged to a young Katipunero. On the eve of her wedding, she took her own life. Grieving her loss, the Spanish officer reportedly cried, “Madre de Dios, no Violeta!” Over time, the phrase “No Violeta” evolved into the town’s name, Noveleta.

Noveleta played a pivotal role in the Philippine revolutionary movement in Cavite. It served as the seat of the Magdiwang Council of the Katipunan, the counterpart to the Magdalo Council led by Gen. Emilio Aguinaldo in Kawit (then Cavite el Viejo). On August 31, 1896, General Mariano Álvarez, founder and president of the Sangguniang Bayan Magdiwang, led the capture of the Noveleta Tribunal. The town’s revolutionary name, Magdiwang, signifies the celebration of a momentous event.

The revolution against the Spanish colonialism produced five capable military generals and tacticians from Noveleta in the persons of Gen. Mariano Alvarez, Gen. Santiago Alvarez (Son of Mariano), Gen. Pascual Alvarez (Cousin of Pascual), Gen. Luciano San Miguel. He was the Last President of the Philippine Revolutionary Government after the capture of Gen. Mariano Trias (First Vice President of the Philippines) and Gen. Miguel Malvar of Batangas. Another hero is Gen. Ariston Villanueva who together with Gen. Santiago Alvarez emerged as the hero of the Battle of Calero.

== Geography ==
Noveleta is the smallest municipality of Cavite. It is 17 kilometres (11 mi) from Imus and 27 kilometres (17 mi) away from Metro Manila and is accessible by land transport modes. The municipality is bordered on the north by Cavite City, on the west by Manila Bay and Rosario. It is flanked by General Trias on the south and Kawit on the east.

With the continuous expansion of Metro Manila, the municipality is now included in the Greater Manila Area which reaches Lipa, Batangas in its southernmost part.

=== Land area ===
Noveleta has a total land area of 16.43 km^{2}, which is roughly 5.41% of the total land area of the province of Cavite. The municipality has 16 barangays. Based on the 2007 Annual Report of the Municipality, the major land use include, residential, agricultural, saltbeds and fishponds and industrial.

=== Barangays ===
Noveleta is politically subdivided into 16 barangays, as indicated in the matrix below. Each barangay consists of puroks and some have sitios.

PSGC	Barangay	Population			±% p.a.	
		2024		2010		
042116001	Magdiwang	4.8%	2,233	1,823	▴	1.41%
042116002	Poblacion	4.7%	2,176	1,966	▴	0.70%
042116003	Salcedo I	4.1%	1,899	2,166	▾	−0.90%
042116004	San Antonio I	11.9%	5,513	4,713	▴	1.09%
042116005	San Juan I	6.4%	2,973	1,920	▴	3.06%
042116006	San Rafael I	2.7%	1,250	1,258	▾	−0.04%
042116007	San Rafael II	7.6%	3,521	3,257	▴	0.54%
042116008	San Jose I	3.2%	1,455	1,108	▴	1.90%
042116009	Santa Rosa I	10.7%	4,932	3,180	▴	3.07%
042116010	Salcedo II	13.9%	6,414	5,769	▴	0.73%
042116011	San Antonio II	4.5%	2,073	1,736	▴	1.23%
042116012	San Jose II	4.0%	1,844	1,116	▴	3.52%
042116013	San Juan II	7.2%	3,313	2,741	▴	1.32%
042116014	San Rafael III	13.4%	6,165	5,835	▴	0.38%
042116015	San Rafael IV	5.3%	2,456	1,864	▴	1.92%
042116016	Santa Rosa II	2.7%	1,235	1,226	▴	0.05%
	Total		46,172	41,678	▴	0.71%

=== Climate ===
Climate data for Noveleta, Cavite
Month	Jan	Feb	Mar	Apr	May	Jun	Jul	Aug	Sep	Oct	Nov	Dec	Year
Mean daily maximum °C (°F)	29 (84)	30 (86)	32 (90)	34 (93)	32 (90)	31 (88)	29 (84)	29 (84)	29 (84)	30 (86)	30 (86)	29 (84)	30 (87)
Mean daily minimum °C (°F)	21 (70)	20 (68)	21 (70)	22 (72)	24 (75)	25 (77)	24 (75)	24 (75)	24 (75)	23 (73)	22 (72)	21 (70)	23 (73)
Average precipitation mm (inches)	10 (0.4)	10 (0.4)	12 (0.5)	27 (1.1)	94 (3.7)	153 (6.0)	206 (8.1)	190 (7.5)	179 (7.0)	120 (4.7)	54 (2.1)	39 (1.5)	1,094 (43)
Average rainy days	5.2	4.5	6.4	9.2	19.7	24.3	26.9	25.7	24.4	21.0	12.9	9.1	189.3
Source: Meteoblue

== Demographics ==
Population census of Noveleta
Year	Pop.	±% p.a.
1903	2,343	—
1918	2,886	+1.40%
1939	4,241	+1.85%
1948	5,003	+1.85%
1960	7,029	+2.87%
1970	10,560	+4.15%
1975	12,141	+2.84%
1980	14,460	+3.56%
1990	20,409	+3.51%
1995	27,306	+5.61%
2000	31,959	+3.43%
2007	39,294	+2.89%
2010	41,678	+2.17%
2015	45,846	+1.83%
2020	49,452	+1.61%
2024	46,172	−1.63%
Source: Philippine Statistics Authority

In the 2024 census, the population of Noveleta was 46,172 people, with a density of 2,800 inhabitants per square kilometre or 7,300 inhabitants per square mile.

=== Religion ===
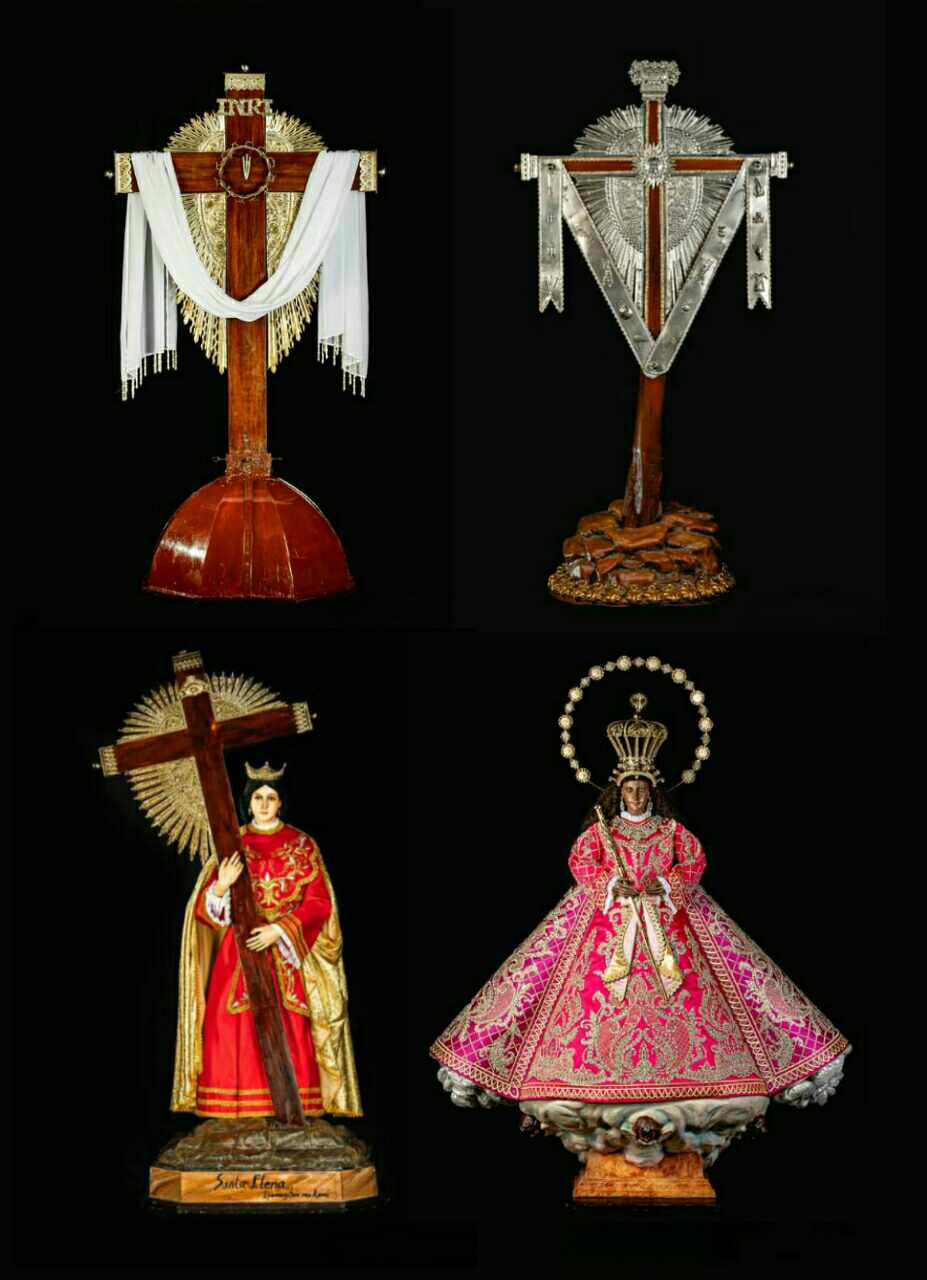
Holy Cross (titular patron of both Roman Catholic and Aglipayan Church), Saint Helena of Constantinople (Roman Catholic) and Nuestra Señora de la Paz y Buen Viaje (Aglipayan Church), Patron saints of Noveleta.

==== Christianity ====
The majority of the people of Noveleta are Roman Catholic under the jurisdiction of the Diocese of Imus. Adherents of the Philippine Independent Church, also known as the Aglipayan Church, under the jurisdiction of the Diocese of Cavite is the second majority and third is Iglesia Ni Cristo but there has been fast growth of other Protestant denominations including Members Church of God International, Baptist, Pentecostal, Mormonism, Jehovah's Witnesses and Born Again Christian.

==== Islam ====
With the influx of migrants from other provinces especially from Mindanao other non-Christian faiths particularly Islam is practiced in the town.

==== Other faiths ====
Non-Abrahamic faiths include native-Tagalog Anitism, Animism and with the local Indian and Chinese communities Hinduism, Buddhism, Taoism and Confucianism are followed.

=== Languages ===
The main languages spoken are Tagalog, and English. Due to the town a large number of people from farther provinces have migrated to Noveleta, resulting in minor but significant usage of the Bicolano, Cebuano, Ilocano, Hiligaynon and Waray languages.

== Economy ==
Poverty incidence of Noveleta (%)

Source: Philippine Statistics Authority

The agricultural sector in Noveleta centers on crop production, fishery, livestock and poultry raising. Fishery is a major source of livelihood in the municipality. Around 100 hectares are utilized for aquaculture and fishpond activities, most of which are in Barangay San Rafael II, III, and IV. The main products of Noveleta include milk-fish, prawns, crabs, tilapia, mussels and oysters. The fishponds are converted to salt beds during the dry season. A big enterprise, which spurs the output in the service sector, is the presence of the Noveca Industries in Barangay Santa Rosa II. Manufacturing is limited to light and medium industries such as sash factories and several garment factories. Other activities are the manufacture of furniture, iron gates and grills, and hollowblocks. The construction boom, on the other hand, is due to the mushrooming of residential subdivisions in the area. A number of commercial establishments are located along Noveleta's major thoroughfares. Small retail stores, service firms, and some medium scale enterprises, dot the municipality. There are specialty stores engaged in the trade of construction supplies and materials, auto parts, furniture and home decors, sportswear as well as fresh food items like meat, fruits and vegetables. Also based in the town are three pharmacies, eleven bakeries and two gasoline stations. The tourism industry in Noveleta relies mainly on its coastline with Manila Bay bordering its western portion. Restaurants, cottages, conference rooms, and social halls/pavilions are situated along the beaches of Barangay San Rafael III and IV.

=== Salt industry ===
In 2024, Noveleta's salt farmers revived their salt production, especially in Barangay San Rafael through the Bureau of Fisheries and Aquatic Resources and the Municipal Agriculture Office's assistance. Republic Act 8172, the "Asin Law" which required salt to be iodized, caused the decline of the production since 2000. However, the 2024 "Philippine Salt Industry Development Act" and Philippine Salt Industry Development Roadmap revitalized the ailing industry.

=== Communication ===
The Philippine Postal Corporation manages one post office situated in the municipal building. The Bureau of Telecommunications of the Department of Transportation and Communication presently operates its office at the Old Noveleta Tribunal. PLDT, Globe and Digitel Telephone Company provide telephone services in the municipality.

=== Investments ===
The agricultural activities in the municipality are gradually decreasing due to urbanization. The current trend in Noveleta is in conversion of land from agriculture use to urban settlements. This may be attributed to its growing population and its proximity to Metro Manila and the Cavite Economic Processing Zone in Rosario, a 10-minute drive from Noveleta. Majority of Noveleta's population is involved in commercial and industrial activities. Historical and tourism landmarks include the Noveleta Tribunal, Calero Bridge, Villamar Beach Resort I, Villamar Beach Resort II, Lido Beach Resort, TIP Beach Resort and the New Noveleta Cockpit Arena. The strips of beaches in Noveleta combined with the town's proximity to major urban centers make it an ideal tourist attraction. Noveleta is included in the "Manila Build-up Area" which makes it ideal for housing and commercial developments. It is only 3 kilometers from Cavitex exit and also 3 kilometers to Sangley Point in Cavite City, the next International Airport.

== Infrastructure ==
=== Transportation ===
Noveleta is accessed by jeeps and mini buses that frequently ply its major thoroughfares, specifically the roads that lead to Rosario, Bacoor, and Cavite City. Tricycles and pedicabs service the backroads of the municipality.

=== Electricity ===
The Manila Electric Company (Meralco) distributes the power supply of Noveleta from the Luzon Grid of the National Power Corporation (NPC).

=== Water supply ===
The Metropolitan Waterworks System in Noveleta provides the water requirement of Noveleta. But majority of the people in Noveleta uses Deep Well, specially on the remote area where the waterworks can't reach.

== Education ==
The Noveleta Schools District Office governs all educational institutions within the municipality. It oversees the management and operations of all private and public, from primary to secondary schools.

=== Primary and elementary schools ===
- Ambrocio S. Robles Memorial Elementary School
- Atheneum School
- Gen. Luciano San Miguel Elementary School
- Gospel Light Christian Academy
- Holy Cross Catholic School
- Montgard Learning Center
- Noveleta Elementary School
- Pacifico O. Aquino Elementary School
- Patnubay Academy
- Saint Therese Catholic School
- Salcedo Elementary School
- San Antonio Elementary School
- San Juan Elementary School
- Unida Nehemiah Christian Academy

=== Secondary school ===
- Noveleta National High School
- Noveleta Science High School
- Noveleta Senior High School

=== Higher educational institutions ===
- Cavite State University- Noveleta Campus
- Columbia College and Computer Technology Center
- Mother Theresa Colegio de Noveleta

== Healthcare ==
Noveleta has ten government health centers and one private clinic as of 1996. There is one private medical hospital located at Salcedo II. The municipality also has three ambulances to support the medical practitioners in responding to the needs of the populace.

== Government ==
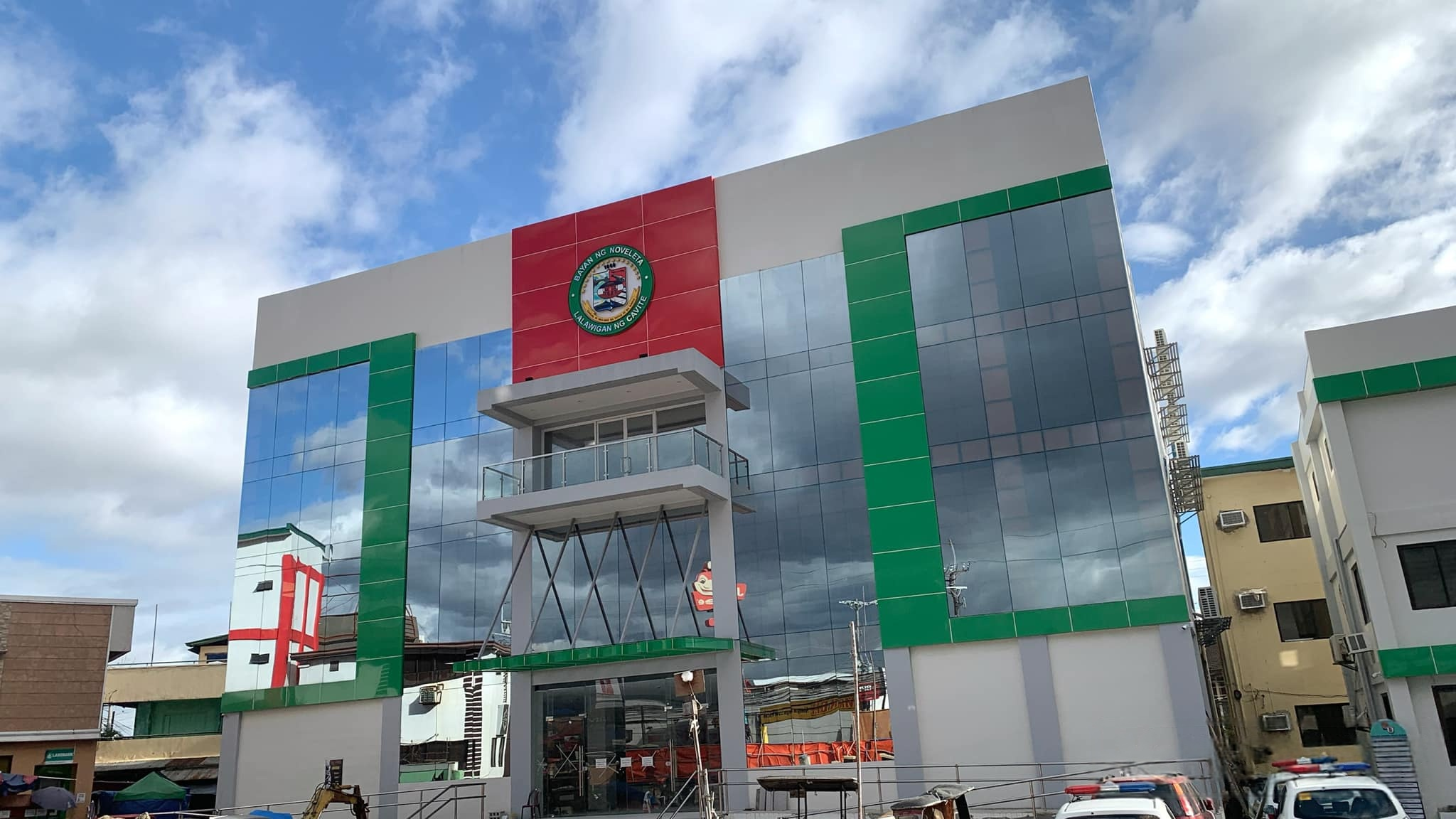
Noveleta Municipal Hall.

=== Elected officials ===
The following are the elected officials of the town elected last May 12, 2025 which serves until June 30, 2028:

Position	Official
Mayor	Davey Reyes Chua
Vice Mayor	Dino Reyes Chua
Sangguniang Bayan; Members	Jay Lontoc
Sangguniang Bayan; Members	Emelito Lontoc
Sangguniang Bayan; Members	Jeg Alix
Sangguniang Bayan; Members	Edwin Salud
Sangguniang Bayan; Members	Patrick Barzaga
Sangguniang Bayan; Members	Axel Enriquez
Sangguniang Bayan; Members	Ricky Saria
Sangguniang Bayan; Members	Donn Louie Alvarez
ABC President	Jun Sidocon
SK Federation President	Paolo Ermitaño
