= Emilio Aguinaldo =

Filipino revolutionary leader (1869–1964)

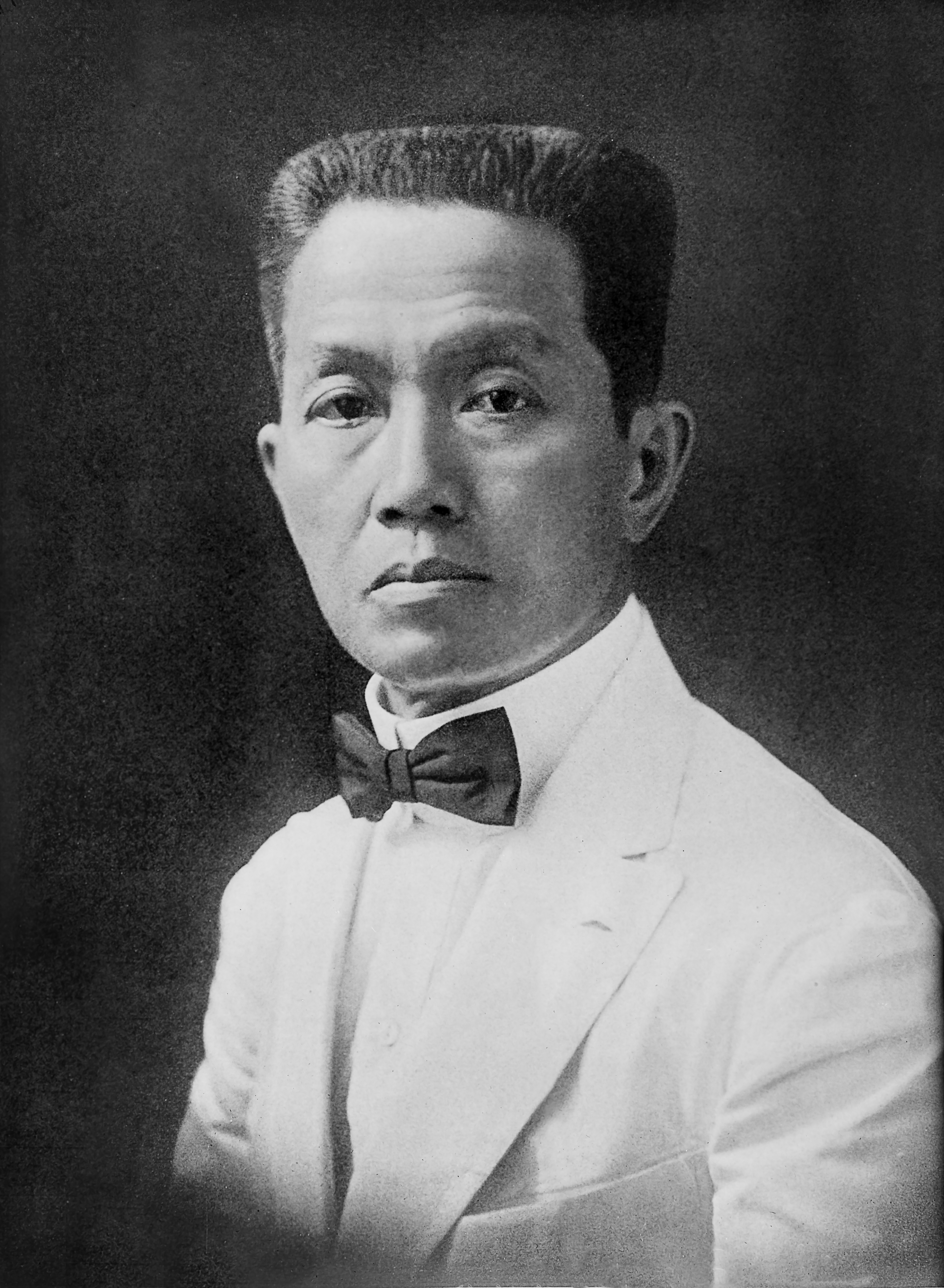
- Portrait by Harris & Ewing, c. 1919

President of the First Philippine Republic (Note: Aguinaldo is honored by the Philippine Presidential Museum and Library as First President of the Philippines for his presidency of the First Philippine Republic. He had held prior positions as president of a revolutionary government from June 23, 1898, to January 22, 1899,, president of the Biak-na-Bato Republic from November 2, 1897, to December 20, 1897, and president of another revolutionaty government from March 22, 1897, to November 2, 1897. He headed a dictatorial government from May 24, 1898, to June 23, 1898; That dictatorial government proclaimed Philippine independence from Spain on June 12, 1898.)
- In office January 23, 1899 (Note: It was the date of Aguinaldo's inauguration as president under the First Philippine Republic of the Malolos Constitution. He had held positions as president of the revolutionary government from March 22, 1897, to November 2, 1897, president of the Biak-na-Bato Republic from November 2, 1897, to December 20, 1897, head of a dictatorial government from May 24, 1898, to June 23, 1898, and president of another revolutionary government from June 23, 1898, to January 22, 1899.) – April 19, 1901 (Note: It was the date that Aguinaldo formally swore an oath accepting the authority of the United States over the Philippines and pledging his allegiance to the American government after he was captured in March 23.)
- Prime Minister: Apolinario Mabini; (January 23 – May 7, 1899); Pedro Paterno; (May 7 – November 13, 1899)
- Preceded by: Position established Diego de los Ríos (as Governor-General of the Philippines)
- Succeeded by: Position abolished (Note: Miguel Malvar acted unofficially as head of the Philippine Republic after Aguinaldo was captured. However, Manuel Quezon, elected in 1935, is officially considered to be the next president following Aguinaldo.); Manuel L. Quezon (1935) (Note: As officially recognized by the contemporary Philippine government; President of the Philippine Commonwealth in 1935)

President of the Revolutionary Government of the Philippines
- In office June 23, 1898 – January 23, 1899
- Prime Minister: Apolinario Mabini; (January 2–23, 1899)
- Preceded by: Position established
- Succeeded by: Position abolished (Revolutionary government superseded by the First Philippine Republic)

Commanding General of the Philippine Revolutionary Army
- In office June 5, 1899 – April 19, 1901
- President: Himself
- Preceded by: Antonio Luna

Dictator of the Philippines
- In office May 24, 1898 – June 23, 1898
- Preceded by: Position established
- Succeeded by: Position abolished (Dictatorial government replaced by a revolutionary government with Aguinaldo assuming the title president)

President of the Republic of Biak-na-Bato
- In office November 2, 1897 – December 14, 1897
- Vice President: Mariano Trías
- Preceded by: Position established
- Succeeded by: Position abolished

President of the Tejeros Revolutionary Government
- In office March 22, 1897 – November 1, 1897
- Vice President: Mariano Trías
- Preceded by: Position established
- Succeeded by: Position abolished (Tejeros government superseded by the Republic of Biak-na-Bato)

Member of the Council of State of the Republic of the Philippines
- In office June 19, 1943 – August 17, 1945
- Preceded by: Position established
- Succeeded by: Position abolished

Personal details
- Born: Emilio Aguinaldo y Famy; March 22, 1869 Sitio Kaingen, Cavite el Viejo, Cavite, Captaincy General of the Philippines, Spanish Empire
- Died: February 6, 1964 (aged 94) Quezon City, Philippines
- Resting place: Emilio Aguinaldo Shrine, Kawit, Cavite, Philippines
- Party: Independent (1897–1964)
- Other political affiliations: National Socialist (1935–1936)
- Spouses: Hilaria del Rosario (m. 1896; sep. 1905); María Agoncillo (m. 1930; died 1963)
- Children: 5
- Education: Colegio de San Juan de Letran
- Profession: Statesman; Military leader
- Awards: Quezon Service Cross; Philippine Legion of Honor; Presidential Medal of Merit; Order of the Knights of Rizal
- Nicknames: "Kapitan Miong"; "Heneral Miong"; "Ka Miong"; "El Caudillo"; "Magdalo"; "Hermano Colon"

Military service
- Allegiance: 1896 Katipunan (Magdalo); 1897 Republic of Biak-na-Bato; 1899 First Philippine Republic
- Branch/service: Philippine Revolutionary Army
- Years of service: 1896–1901
- Rank: Generalissimo Minister Marshal
- Battles/wars: List: Philippine Revolution; Kawit revolt; Battle of Imus; Battle of Talisay; Battle of Binakayan; Battle of Pateros; Battle of Zapote Bridge; Battle of Naic; Battle of Mount Puray; Battle of Aliaga; Siege of Biak-na-Bato Spanish–American War; Battle of Alapan; Battle of Manila Philippine–American War; Battle of Marilao River
- Footnotes

Emilio Aguinaldo y Famy (Note: In the Philippine "Declaration of Independence" his maternal family name is given as Fami.) (Spanish: [eˈmiljo aɣiˈnaldo j ˈfami]: March 22, 1869 – February 6, 1964) was a Filipino revolutionary, statesman, and military leader who served as president of the Philippines from 1899 to 1901, and the president of the first constitutional republic in Asia. He led Philippine forces first against Restoration-era Spain in the Philippine Revolution (1896–1898), then in the Spanish–American War (1898), and later against the United States during the Philippine–American War (1899–1901). He is regarded in the Philippines as the country's first president during the period of the First Philippine Republic, although his presidency was not widely recognized outside of the revolutionary Philippines.

Aguinaldo is known as a national hero in the Philippines, and designed the flag of the Philippines. However, he was also involved in the deaths of the revolutionary leader Andrés Bonifacio and general Antonio Luna. In World War II, he collaborated as a puppet leader with the Empire of Japan during its occupation of the Philippines.

== Early life and career ==
Emilio Aguinaldo was born on March 22, 1869 (Note: The exact date of Aguinaldo's birthdate was March 22, 1869. It can be seen in National Historical Institute's marker in Aguinaldo Shrine, Kawit, Cavite. Some sources give other dates.) in Cavite el Viejo (present-day Kawit) in the province of Cavite to Carlos Aguinaldo y Jamir and Trinidad Famy y Villanueva, a couple that had eight children, the seventh of whom was Emilio. He was baptized and raised in Roman Catholicism. The Aguinaldo family was quite well-to-do as his father, Carlos Aguinaldo, was the community's appointed Gobernadorcillo (municipal governor) in the Spanish Viceregal administration. He studied at Colegio de San Juan de Letran, but could not finish his studies due to an outbreak of cholera in 1882. On April 30, 1888, he entered the lottery of the Spanish auxiliary conscription with number 221.

He became a cabeza de barangay in 1893, before the Maura Law called for the reorganization of local governments. At the age of 25, Aguinaldo became Cavite el Viejo's first Gobernadorcillo Capitan Municipal (municipal governor-captain) while he was on a business trip in Mindoro.

== Philippine Revolution ==
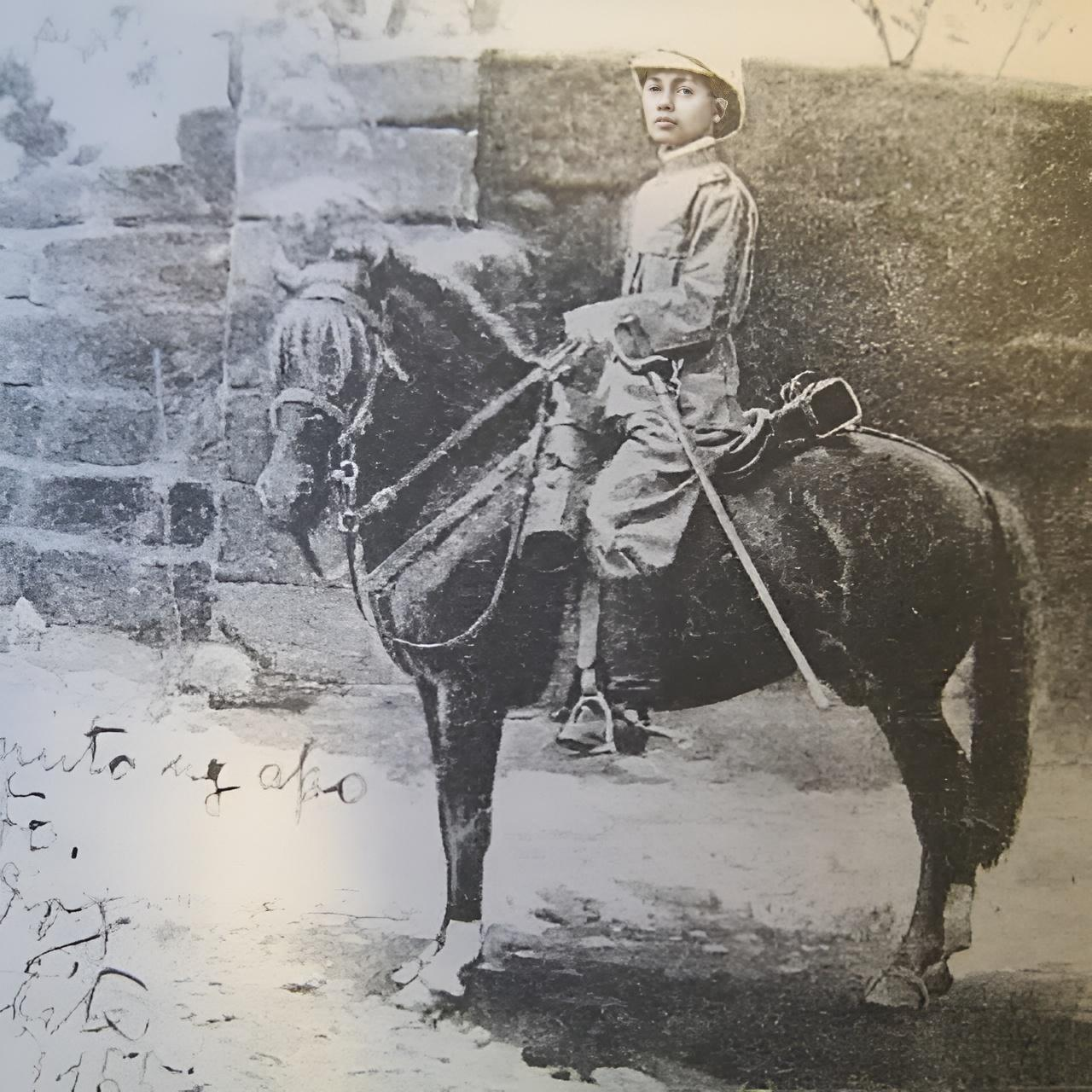
President Aguinaldo at Malolos, Bulacan wearing the Rayadillo uniform and in horseback, with the Aguirre sword, a trophy of the Battle of Imus c. 1898.

On January 1, 1895, Aguinaldo became a Freemason, joining Pilar Lodge No. 203, Imus, Cavite by the codename "Colon".

On March 7, 1895, Santiago Alvarez, whose father was a Capitan Municipal (Mayor) of Noveleta, encouraged Aguinaldo to join the "Katipunan", a secret organization led by Andrés Bonifacio that was dedicated to the expulsion of the Spanish and the independence of the Philippines through armed force. Aguinaldo joined the organization and used the nom de guerre Magdalo in honor of Mary Magdalene. The local chapter of Katipunan in Cavite was established and named Sangguniang Magdalo, and Aguinaldo's cousin Baldomero Aguinaldo was appointed leader.

The Katipunan-led Philippine Revolution against the Spanish began in the last week of August 1896 in San Juan del Monte (now part of Metro Manila). However, Aguinaldo and other Cavite rebels initially refused to join in the offensive for lack of arms. Bonifacio and other rebels were forced to resort to guerrilla warfare, but Aguinaldo and the Cavite rebels won major victories in carefully planned and well-timed set-piece battles and temporarily drove the Spanish out of their area. On August 31, 1896, Aguinaldo started the assault by beginning as a skirmish to the full-blown revolt Kawit Revolt. He marched with his army of bolomen to the town center of Kawit. Prior to the battle, Aguinaldo had strictly ordered his men not to kill anyone in his hometown. Upon his men's arrival at the town center, the guards, armed with Remingtons and unaware of the preceding events, were caught completely by surprise and surrendered immediately. The guns there were captured by the Katipuneros, and the revolt was a major success for Aguinaldo and his men. Later that afternoon, they raised the Magdalo flag at the town hall to a large crowd of people from Kawit that had assembled after it heard of the city's liberation.

The Magdalo faction of the Katipunan, which also operated in Cavite under Gen. Aguinaldo, used flags similar to those used by the Magdiwang faction and featuring a white sun with a red baybayin symbol for Ka.

The symbol has recently been revived by a breakaway group of army officers to show the end of war with Spain after the peace agreement. The flag became the first official banner of the revolutionary forces and was blessed in a crowd celebrating at Imus. Aguinaldo referred to this flag in his proclamation of October 31, 1896: "Filipino people!! The hour has arrived to shed blood for the conquest of our liberty. Assemble and follow the flag of the Revolution – it stands for Liberty, Equality and Fraternity."

=== Battle of Imus ===
In August 1896, as coordinated attacks broke out and sparked the revolution beginning in Manila. Aguinaldo marched from Kawit with 600 men and launched a series of skirmishes at Imus that eventually ended in open hostilities against Spanish troops stationed there. On September 1, with the aid of Captain Jose Tagle of Imus, they laid siege against Imus to draw the Spanish out. A Spanish relief column commanded by Brigadier-General Ernesto de Aguirre had been dispatched from Manila to aid the beleaguered Spanish defenders of Imus. Supported only by 100 troops and by cavalry, Aguirre gave the impression that he had been sent out to suppress a minor disturbance. Aguinaldo and his men counterattacked but suffered heavy losses that almost cost his own life. Despite the success, Aguirre did not press the attack, felt the inadequacy of his troops, and hastened back to Manila to get reinforcements. During the lull in the fighting, Aguinaldo's troops reorganized and prepared for another Spanish attack. On September 3, Aguirre came back with a much larger force of 3,000 men. When Spanish troops arrived at the Isabel II Bridge, they were fired upon by the concealed rebels. The Spanish force was routed, withdrawing in disorder with substantial casualties. Among the abandoned Spanish weapons was Aguirre's sword, which was carried by Aguinaldo in future battles.

=== Battles of Binakayan–Dalahican ===
Alarmed by a previous siege, led by General Aguinaldo in Imus, in September 1896, Governor-General Ramón Blanco y Erenas ordered the 4th Battalion of Cazadores from Spain to aid him in quelling the rebellion in Cavite. On November 3, 1896, the battalion arrived carrying a squadron of 1,328 men and some 55 officers. Also, Blanco ordered about 8,000 men who recently came from Cuba and Spain to join in suppressing the rebellion. Prior to the land attacks, Spanish naval raids were conducted on the shores of Cavite, where cannons bombarded the revolutionary fortifications in Bacoor, Noveleta, Binakayan, and Cavite Viejo. The most fortified locations in Noveleta were the Dalahican and Dagatan shores, defended by Magdiwang soldiers commanded by General Santiago Alvarez, and the adjacent fishing village of Binakayan in Kawit was fortified by Magdalo under General Aguinaldo. Spanish naval operations were determined to crush the fortifications in these areas, mainly because the lake around Dalahican was strategic by connecting to the interior of Cavite. Apart from defending Binakayan, the Magdalo soldiers also kept the lower part of Dagatan up to Cavite's border near Manila province. Between the barrios of Binakayan and Dalahican, the Spanish forces lost decisively since the Filipino rebels, led by Aguinaldo and Alvarez, routed them back to Cavite Nuevo in which the remaining Spanish troops would eventually surrender. The successful defenses of Binakayan and Dalahican was considered to be the first major victory of the Filipinos over a colonial power.

=== Battle of Zapote Bridge ===
Newly appointed Governor-General Camilo de Polavieja, was now fully aware that the main weight of the revolution was in Cavite and so decided to launch a two-pronged assault to defeat the revolutionaries, led by Aguinaldo. He ordered General José de Lachambre with a much bigger force to march against Silang to take on the Katipuneros from the rear, and he would engage the Filipinos head on. On February 13, 1897, Aguinaldo ordered soldiers to plant dynamite along the bridge and to place pointed bamboo sticks in the river beds below the bridge. Several hours later, 12,000 Spaniards began to cross the bridge. The trap was sprung, and the dynamite was detonated, which killed several Spanish troops and injured many more. The rebels then emerged from the bushes, fought hand to hand, and repelled consecutive waves of enemy troops charging across the river. Edilberto Evangelista was shot in the head and died. Cavite Province gradually emerged as the Revolution's hotbed, and the Aguinaldo-led Katipuneros had a string of victories there. After the battle, the demoralized Spanish soldiers retreated towards Muntinlupa.

=== Spanish Cavite offensive and Battle of Perez Dasmariñas ===
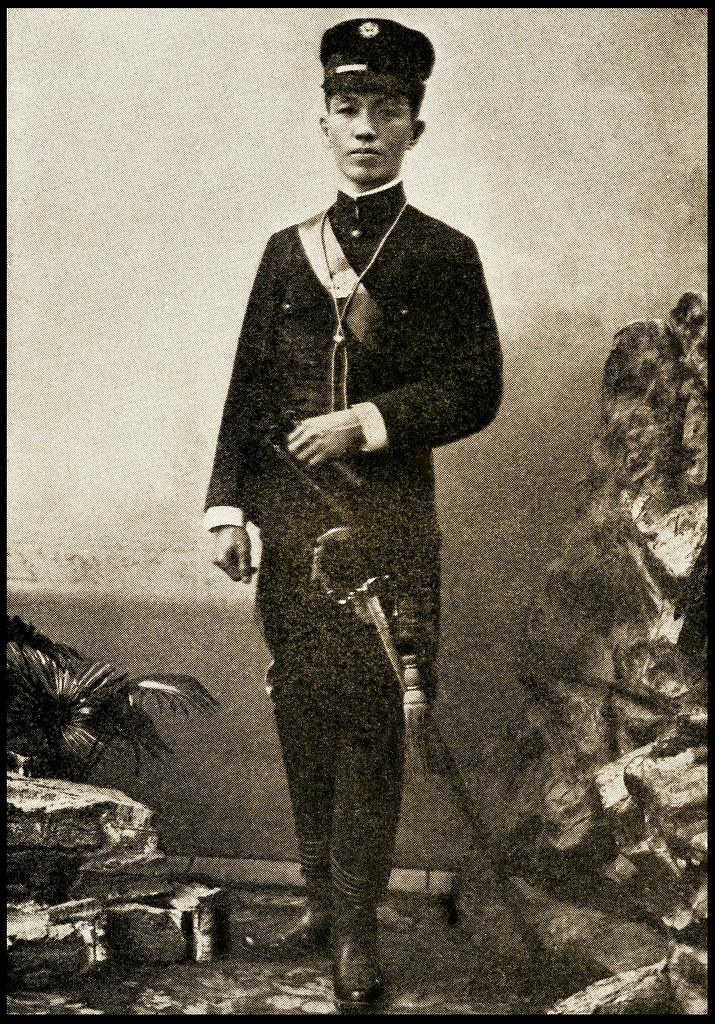
Aguinaldo in military uniform

While Polavieja was poised to strike at Zapote, another Spanish contingent was marching towards Aguinaldo's rear. On February 15, 1897, the Spaniards launched the powerful Cavite Offensive to drive out and crush Filipino revolutionaries under Aguinaldo and his Magdalo forces, who had won numerous victories against the Spanish in the early stages of the revolution. Renewed and fully equipped with 100 cannons, 23,000 Spanish cazadores forces under Major General Jose de Lachambre saw town after town fall back to the Crown. Starting the offensive at Pamplona, Cavite, and Bayungyungan, Batangas, Lachambre's men later marched deep into the heart of Aguinaldo's home province.

Having just won the Battle of Zapote Bridge, Aguinaldo turned his attention at the new Spanish threat and was determined to recapture most of Cavite. Aguinaldo decided to deploy his forces at Pasong Santol, a bottleneck of Perez Dasmariñas on the way to Imus, which rendered the Spanish immobile and served the revolutionaries by its natural defensive positions. On February 19, Silang fell to the Spanish juggernaut despite attempts by Filipino forces to defend and then to recover it. Nine days later, Spanish forces marched into Dasmariñas to reclaim the town. A week later, Spanish troops used artillery pieces well to attack again as they moved towards Aguinaldo's capital, Imus. Meanwhile, on March 22 at the Tejeros Convention, Aguinaldo was voted in absentia as president of the reorganized revolutionary government. Colonel Vicente Riego de Dios was sent by the assembly to fetch Aguinaldo, who was in Pasong Santol. Aguinaldo refused to come and Crispulo Aguinaldo, his older brother, was sent to talk to him. Crispulo greeted and talked to his brother and explained his purpose, but Aguinaldo was hesitant to leave his post because of the pending attack of the Spanish in Dasmariñas. Crispulo took over Aguinaldo's leadership in the battle, which had been stalemated since March 7, and Aguinaldo traveled to San Francisco de Malabon (now General Trias, Cavite) to take his oath as president.

=== Tejeros Convention ===
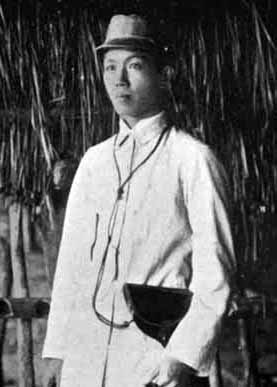
Aguinaldo as a Generalissimo, Commander-in-Chief of all Philippine forces.

Conflict within the ranks of the Katipunan factions, specifically between the Magdalo and Magdiwang, led to the Imus assembly in Cavite Province, presided over by Bonifacio. The rebels of Cavite were rumored to have made overtures to establish a revolutionary government in place of the Katipunan. Though Bonifacio already considered the Katipunan to be a government, he acquiesced and presided over a convention held on March 22, 1897, in Tejeros, San Francisco de Malabon, Cavite. Aguinaldo was elected president, even though he was occupied with military matters in Imus and not in attendance. Mariano Trias was elected as vice-president, Artemio Ricarte as captain-general, Emiliano Riego de Dios as the director of war, and Andres Bonifacio as director of the interior. The results were questioned by Daniel Tirona for Bonifacio's qualifications for that position. Bonifacio was insulted and declared, "I, as chairman of this assembly, and as President of the Supreme Council of the Katipunan, as all of you do not deny, declare this assembly dissolved, and I annul all that has been approved and resolved." Regardless of the nullification, Aguinaldo traveled surreptitiously to San Francisco de Malabon where, on the evening of March 23, he took an oath assuming the office to which he had been elected as Generalissimo of the Philippine Islands.

=== Biak-na-Bato and exile ===
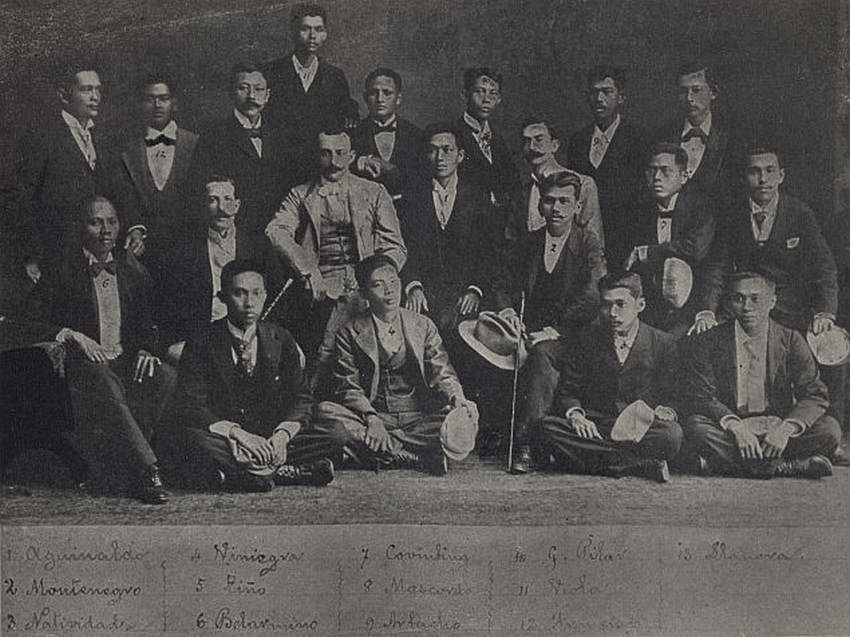
Aguinaldo with the other revolutionaries on the Pact of Biak-na-Bato

The Spanish Army launched an attack that forced the revolutionary forces under Aguinaldo into a retreat. On June 24, 1897, Aguinaldo arrived at Biak-na-Bato, San Miguel, Bulacan, and established a headquarters there in what is now called "Aguinaldo Cave" in Biak-na-Bato National Park. In late October 1897, Aguinaldo convened an assembly of generals at Biak-na-Bato that decided to establish a constitutional republic. A constitution, patterned closely after the Cuban Constitution, was drawn up by Isabelo Artacho and Felix Ferrer and provided for the creation of a Supreme Council composed of a president, a vice president, a Secretary of War, and a Secretary of the Treasury. Aguinaldo was named president.

In March 1897, Fernando Primo de Rivera, 1st Marquis of Estella, the Spanish Governor-General of the Philippines, had been encouraging prominent Filipinos to contact Aguinaldo for a peaceful settlement of the conflict. On August 9, the Manila lawyer Pedro Paterno met with Aguinaldo at Biak-na-Bato with a proposal for peace based on reforms and amnesty. In the succeeding months, Paterno conducted shuttle diplomacy, acting as an intermediary between de Rivera and Aguinaldo. On December 14–15, 1897, Aguinaldo signed the Pact of Biak-na-Bato under which Aguinaldo effectively agreed to end hostilities and to dissolve his government in exchange for amnesty and "₱800,000 (Mexican)" (Aguinaldo's description of the $MXN800,000 (Note: The Mexican dollar at the time was worth about US$0.50 (equivalent to $19.35 in 2025). The peso fuerte and the Mexican dollar were interchangeable at par.) amount) as an indemnity. The documents were signed on December 14–15, 1897. On December 23, Aguinaldo and other revolutionary officials departed for Hong Kong to enter voluntary exile. MXN$400,000, representing the first installment of the indemnity, was deposited into Hong Kong banks. In exile, Aguinaldo reorganized his revolutionary government into the "Hong Kong Junta" and enlarged it into the "Supreme Council of the Nation".

=== Return to the Philippines ===
Flag of the First Philippine Republic 1898–1901.

Aguinaldo's revolutionary flag (obverse).

Aguinaldo's revolutionary flag (reverse).

On April 25, 1898, the Spanish–American War began. The war mostly focused on Cuba, but the US Navy's Asiatic Squadron was in Hong Kong and, commanded by Commodore George Dewey, it sailed for the Philippines. On May 1, in the Battle of Manila Bay, the squadron engaged attacked and destroyed the Spanish Army and Navy's Pacific Squadron and proceeded to blockade Manila. Several days later, Dewey agreed to transport Aguinaldo from Hong Kong to the Philippines aboard the USS McCulloch, which left Hong Kong with Aguinaldo on May 16 and arrived in Cavite on May 19. Aguinaldo promptly resumed the command of revolutionary forces and besieged Manila.

=== Dictatorial government and Battle of Alapan ===
Aguinaldo had brought with him the draft constitution of Mariano Ponce for the establishment of a federal revolutionary republic upon his return to Manila, but on May 24, 1898, in Cavite, Aguinaldo issued a proclamation upon the advice of his war counselor Ambrosio Rianzares Bautista, and Aguinaldo assumed the command of all Philippine forces and established a dictatorial government with himself as titular dictator and power vested upon him to administer decrees promulgated under his sole responsibility. The dictatorial government was provisional in character until peace was established and unrestrained liberty attained. Dean Worcester wrote, "although the title of 'president' was assumed by Aguinaldo, as more likely to be favourably considered in the United States than 'dictator', the tendency of his followers who had not been educated in Europe was to speak of and to regard him not as a president, but as an overlord holding all power in his hands."

On May 28, 1898, Aguinaldo gathered a force of about 18,000 troops and fought against a small garrison of Spanish troops in Alapan, Imus, Cavite. The battle lasted from 10:00 a.m. to 3:00 p.m. After the victory at Alapan, Aguinaldo unfurled the Philippine flag for the first time and hoisted it at the Teatro Caviteño in Cavite Nuevo (present-day Cavite City) in front of Filipino revolutionaries and more than 300 captured Spanish troops. A group of American sailors of the US Asiatic Squadron also witnessed the unfurling. Flag Day is celebrated every May 28 to honor the battle.

=== Declaration of independence and revolutionary government ===
On June 12, Aguinaldo promulgated the Philippine Declaration of Independence from Spain in his own mansion house in Cavite El Viejo, believing that declaration would inspire the Filipino people to eagerly rise against the Spaniards. On June 18, he issued a decree formally establishing his dictatorial government in which he also provided for the organization of the local government and the establishment and the composition of the Revolutionary Congress.

On June 23, Aguinaldo issued a decree replacing his dictatorial government with a revolutionary government with himself as president upon the recommendation of his adviser Apolinario Mabini. The decree defined the organization of the central government and the establishment and the election of delegates to the Revolutionary Congress and to prepare for the shift from a revolutionary government to a republic.

=== Arrival of American troops ===
Aguinaldo in The Story of the Philippines and Our New Possessions (1898) by Murat Halstead.

By May 1898, Filipino troops had cleared Cavite of Spanish forces. In late June 1898, Aguinaldo, with the help of American allies, who were now landing in Cavite, was now preparing to drive the Spaniards out of Manila. The first contingent of American troops arrived in Cavite on June 30, the second under General Francis V. Greene on July 17, and the third under General Arthur MacArthur Jr on July 30. By then, 12,000 US troops had landed in the Philippines.

Aguinaldo had presented surrender terms to Spanish Governor-General of the Philippines Basilio Augustín, who refused them initially since he believed that more Spanish troops would be sent to lift the siege. As the combined forces of Filipinos and Americans were closing in, Augustín realized that his position was hopeless, secretly continued to negotiate with Aguinaldo, and even offered ₱1 million, but Aguinaldo refused. When the Spanish Cortes learned of Augustín's attempt to negotiate the surrender of his army to Filipinos under Aguinaldo, it was furious and relieved Augustín of his duties effective July 24. He was replaced by Fermin Jáudenes. On June 16, warships departed Spain to lift the siege, but they altered course for Cuba where a Spanish fleet was imperiled by the US Navy.

In August 1898, life in Intramuros, the walled center of Manila, had become unbearable, and the normal population of about 10,000 was now 70,000. Realizing that it was only a matter of time before the city fell and fearing vengeance and looting if the city fell to Filipino revolutionaries, Jáudenes, suggested to Dewey, through the Belgian consul, Édouard André, for the city to be surrendered to the Americans after a short, "mock" battle. Dewey had initially rejected the suggestion because he lacked the troops to block Filipino revolutionary forces, which numbered 40 000, but when Merritt's troops became available, he sent a message to Jáudenes, agreeing to the mock battle. A bloodless mock battle had been planned, but Spanish troops opened fire in a skirmish that left six Americans and forty-nine Spaniards dead after Filipino revolutionaries, thinking that the attack was genuine, joined advancing US troops. Besides the unplanned casualties, the battle went according to plan. The Spanish surrendered the city to the Americans, and it did not fall to the Filipino revolutionaries, who felt betrayed. By the end of September, Aguinaldo's forces had captured over 9,000 Spanish prisoners, who were relieved of their weapons. They were generally free to move around but remained within the control of Aguinaldo. Aguinaldo did not know that on December 10, 1898, the Treaty of Paris had been signed; it transferred the Philippines from Spain to the United States for the sum of $20 million.

== First Philippine Republic ==
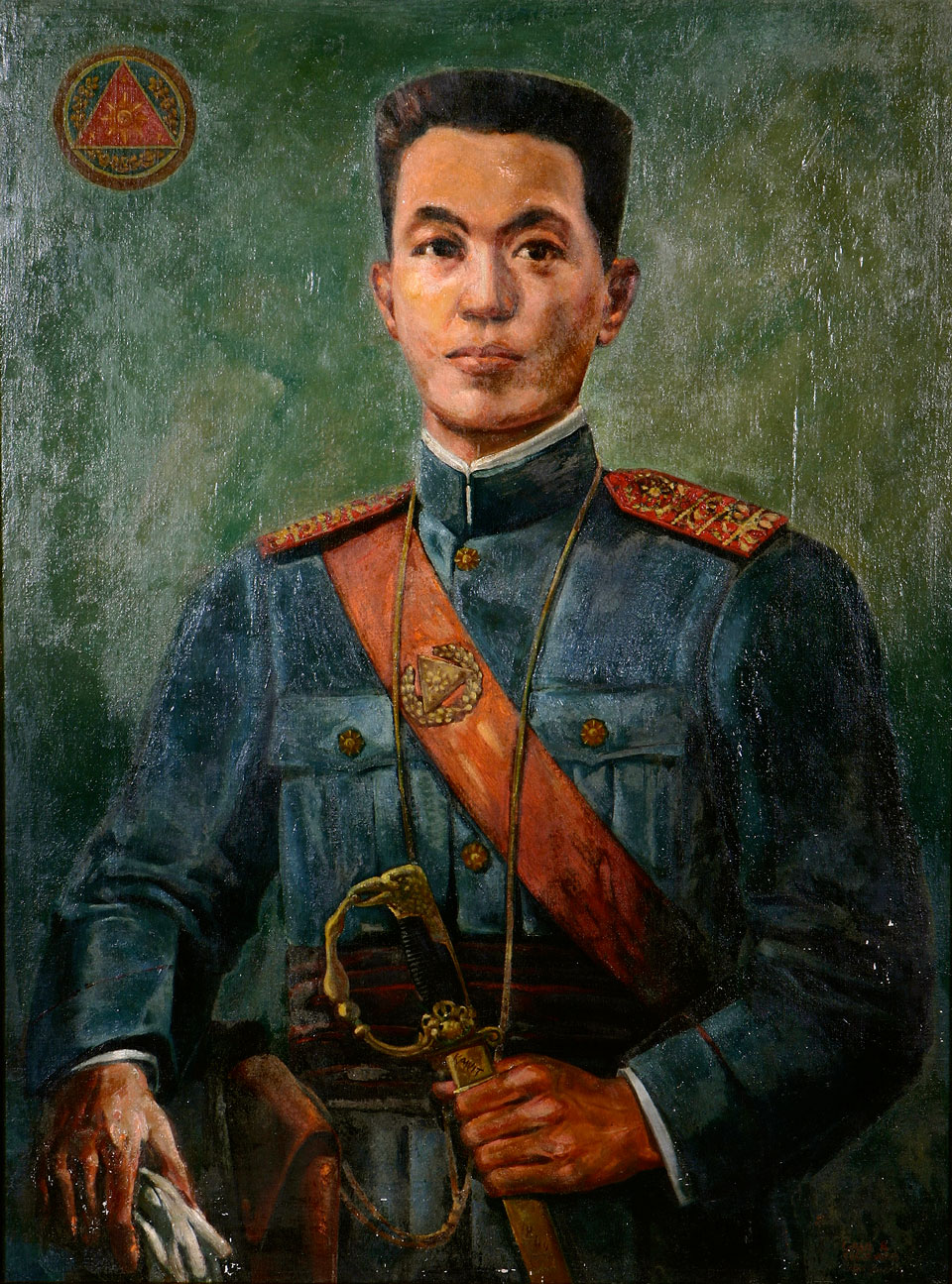
Official Malacañang Palace portrait of Aguinaldo by Galo Ocampo

The First Philippine Republic was formally established with the proclamation of the Malolos Constitution on January 21, 1899, in Malolos, Bulacan and endured until capture of Aguinaldo by the American forces on March 23, 1901, in Palanan, Isabela, which effectively dissolved the First Republic. Aguinaldo wrote in Tarlac during the First Republic the Tagalog manuscript of his autobiographical work, which would later be translated by Felipe Buencamino into Spanish and released as Reseña Veridica de la Revolucion Filipina (in English, True Account of the Philippine Revolution).

On August 13, 1898, American forces had captured Manila during the "mock" Battle of Manila and on August 14, 1898, established the United States Military Government of the Philippine Islands, with Major-General Wesley Merritt as the first American Military Governor. On the night of February 4, 1899, a Filipino was shot by an American sentry. That incident was considered to be the beginning of the Philippine–American War and culminated in the 1899 Battle of Manila between American and Filipino forces. Superior American military technology drove Filipino troops away from the city, and Aguinaldo's government had to move from one place to another as defeats mounted. At the Battle of Marilao River, Aguinaldo himself took command in a desperate attempt to prevent American crossings. The Americans gained superiority in the battle only after severe fighting and the use of gunboats in the river that "made a great execution" of Filipino soldiers. On November 13, 1899, Aguinaldo issued an order disbanding the remnants of the Filipino national army; in the same order, he formulated a strategy of guerrilla warfare. Aguinaldo subsequently fled to Northern Luzon, where he continued to exercise command.

=== Capture and declaration of allegiance to the US ===
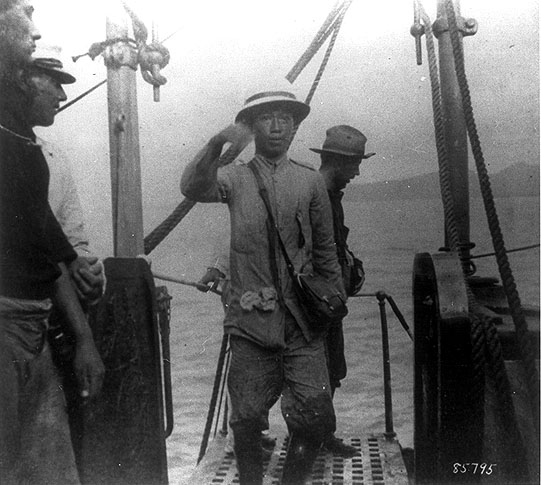
Aguinaldo boarding USS Vicksburg following his capture in 1901

On March 23, 1901, with the aid of Macabebe Scouts, forces led by General Frederick Funston, Aguinaldo was captured in his headquarters in Palanan, Isabela. He was transported to Manila, where he was detained in a house on the grounds of Malacañang Palace, then the headquarters of US Governor-General Arthur MacArthur Jr. (Note: Though technically a prisoner, Aguinaldo was treated more or less as a guest and allowed substantial freedom of movement and access to information and visitors.)

On April 19, 1901, Aguinaldo took an oath of allegiance to the United States, formally ending the First Republic and recognizing the sovereignty of the United States over the Philippines. He published a manifesto in which he acknowledged that most of the Filipino people had united around the United States, declaring "unmistakably in favor of peace", said, "a complete termination of hostilities and lasting peace are not only desirable, but absolutely essential to the welfare of the Philippine Islands." In this manifesto, he acknowledged and accepted US sovereignty throughout the Philippines. The manifesto framed peace as necessary for social stability and the welfare of ordinary Filipinos, reflecting early debates about equality, governance, and the social consequences of prolonged conflict.

== Controversies ==
=== As president of a sovereign, independent Philippines ===
Aguinaldo is described as president of the Philippines in some official and authoritative sources in connection with insurgent governments he headed in revolution against outside sovereignties holding the Philippines as a territorial possession.

=== Execution of the Bonifacio brothers ===
Bonifacio refused to recognize the revolutionary government that was elected in the Tejeros Convention and reasserted his authority via the Acta de Tejeros and the Naic Military Agreement. He accused the Magdalo faction of treason and issued orders that are contradictory and contravention to the revolutionary government. On April 25, 1897, several complaints were sent to Aguinaldo, notably by Severino de las Alas, a known supporter and loyalist of Bonifacio, along with Jose Coronel, and many others, that Bonifacio and his men ransacked, pillaged and burned the town of Indang, stealing the carabaos and other work animals by force and killed them for food and terrorized the townspeople for being unable to give enough supplies and other provisions due to poor harvest. Aguinaldo was then forced to order the arrest of Bonifacio. After the trials, Andrés and his brother, Procopio, were ordered by the Consejo de la Guerra (Council of War) to be executed by firing squad under the command of Major Lazaro Macapagal on May 10, 1897, near Mount Nagpatong, Mount Buntis, Mount Pumutok, and Maragondon, Cavite. Aguinaldo had pardoned the Bonifacio brothers and that they should be exiled in Pico de Loro, but Pío del Pilar and Mariano Noriel, both former supporters and loyalist of Bonifacio, along with other high-ranking generals of the revolution, forced Aguinaldo to withdraw the order for the sake of preserving unity. According to Aguinaldo, in his two books "Mga Gunita ng Himagsikan" and "A Second Look at America", he stated that his withdrawal of the commutation order/exile did not mean immediate implementation of the death verdict, that Noriel had misconstrued this and acted hastily. He says he wanted a little more time for a cooling-off period so that eventually the Bonifacio brothers would be forgiven and pardoned.

=== Assassination of Luna ===
Antonio Luna was a highly regarded general in the revolution who was sometimes at odds with Aguinaldo. On June 2, 1899, Luna received one telegram (he failed to receive two others) sent by Aguinaldo himself. According to Ambeth Ocampo, the message that Aguinaldo sent stated "Felipe Buencamino is detained without ordering the formation of the case. I await your reply to my previous telegram where I request the basis for your accusation. Beseech urgency."

Luna wrote to Arcadio Maxilom, military commander of Cebu, to stand firm in the war. Luna set off from Bayambang, first by train, then on horseback, and eventually in three carriages, to Nueva Ecija with 25 of his men. During the journey, two of the carriages broke down and so he proceeded with just one carriage with Colonel Francisco Román and Captain Eduardo Rusca, having earlier shed his cavalry escort. On June 4, Luna sent a telegram to Aguinaldo to confirm his arrival. Upon arriving at Cabanatuan on June 5, Luna alone proceeded to headquarters to communicate with the president. As he went up the stairs, he ran into two men: Felipe Buencamino, Minister of Foreign Affairs and a member of the Cabinet; and Captain Pedro Janolino. The commander of the Kawit Battalion, Janolino was an old enemy whom Luna had disarmed for insubordination, and once threatened with arrest for favoring American autonomy. General Luna was told that Aguinaldo had left for San Isidro in Nueva Ecija. (He had actually gone to Bamban in Tarlac.) Enraged, Luna asked why he had not been told that the meeting had been canceled.

The general and the captain exchanged heated words as Luna was about to depart. In the plaza, a rifle shot rang out. Still outraged and furious, Luna rushed down the stairs and met Janolino, accompanied by some elements of the Kawit Battalion. Janolino swung his bolo at Luna, wounding him in the head. Janolino's men fired at Luna while others started stabbing him even as he tried to fire his revolver at one of his attackers. He staggered out into the plaza where Román and Rusca were rushing to his aid, but as he lay dying, they too were set upon and shot, with Román being killed and Rusca being severely wounded. Luna received more than 30 wounds and uttered "Traitors! Assassins!" He was hurriedly buried in the churchyard, and Aguinaldo relieved Luna's officers and men from the field, including General Venacio Concepción, whose headquarters in Angeles, Pampanga, Aguinaldo besieged the same day that Luna was assassinated.

Immediately after Luna's death, confusion reigned on both sides. The Americans even thought that Luna had taken over to replace Aguinaldo. Luna's death was publicly declared only by June 8, and a circular providing details of the event was released by June 13. Investigations were supposedly made concerning Luna's death, but not one person was convicted. Later, General Pantaleón García said in 1921 that he was verbally ordered by Aguinaldo to conduct the assassination of Luna at Cabanatuan. His sickness then prevented his participation in the assassination. Aguinaldo would be firm in his stand that he had nothing to do with the assassination of Luna.

== American era ==
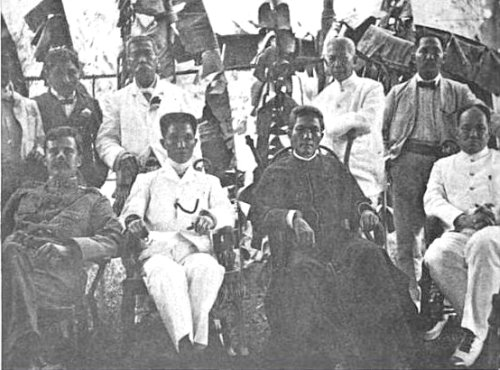
Aguinaldo (front row, second from left), at a pre-Christmas feast in Manila in 1904.

During the American period, Aguinaldo largely retired from public life, though continued to support groups that advocated for immediate independence and helped veterans of the struggle. He organized the Asociación de los Veteranos de la Revolución (Association of Veterans of the Revolution) to secure pensions for its members and made arrangements for them to buy land by installments from the government.

Displaying the Philippine flag was declared illegal by the Sedition Act of 1907, but it was amended on October 30, 1919. Then, Aguinaldo transformed his home in Kawit into a monument to the flag, the revolution, and the Declaration of Independence. After Aguinaldo's death, the government declared the mansion as a National Shrine in June 1964.

=== 1935 Philippine presidential election ===
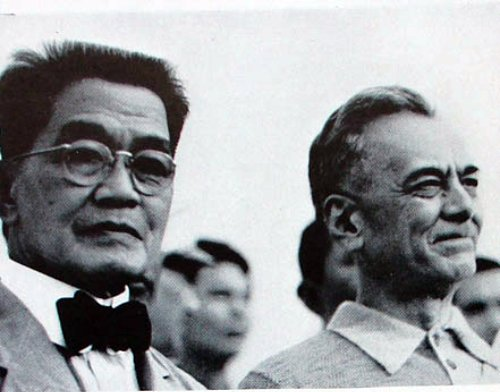
Aguinaldo and Manuel Quezon during Flag Day, 1935.

Aguinaldo delivers a speech in Spanish (1929)

In 1935, the Philippines became a commonwealth, and presidential elections were held as part of a ten-year transition to complete independence. Aguinaldo returned to public life and ran for the presidency as the candidate of the National Socialist Party (no relation to the German Nazi Party) against the highly popular Nacionalista Party candidate Manuel L. Quezon and Republican Party candidate Gregorio Aglipay. However, Aguinaldo's capture by the Americans in 1901 as well as his allegations in the deaths of Bonifacio and Luna had since made him an unpopular figure among the Filipino people, and he lost to Quezon in a landslide, gaining only 17.5% of the popular vote.

Despite his decisive defeat, however, Aguinaldo refused to accept the results of the election, asserting that it was rigged against him. In Cavite, the only province he had won, Aguinaldo's supporters plotted a rally in Manila to disrupt Quezon's inauguration and even assassinate him. However, this planned event was never actually carried out. Aguinaldo continued to criticize Quezon throughout the latter's presidency, expressing anti-semitic views when opposing Quezon's plan to shelter Jews fleeing from the Holocaust. In 1939, Aguinaldo vigorously expressed his antisemitism by echoing bigoted notions that Jewish people were "dangerous" and "selfishly materialistic".

The two men formally reconciled in 1941, when Quezon moved Flag Day to June 12 to commemorate the proclamation of Philippine independence.

== World War II ==
=== Collaboration with Japan and Second Republic ===
The Empire of Japan invaded the Philippines on 8 December 1941, ten hours after the attack on Pearl Harbor that had brought the United States into World War II. Aguinaldo, a longtime admirer of Japan, sided with them, as he had previously supported groups that demanded the immediate independence of the Philippines, and entrusted that Japan would free the islands from American rule. In January 1942, Aguinaldo met with General Masami Maeda at the former's Cavite residence to discuss the creation of a pro-Japanese provisional government. On February 1, Aguinaldo delivered a radio address calling upon General Douglas MacArthur and all American and Filipino troops fighting in the Battle of Bataan to surrender to the Japanese army.

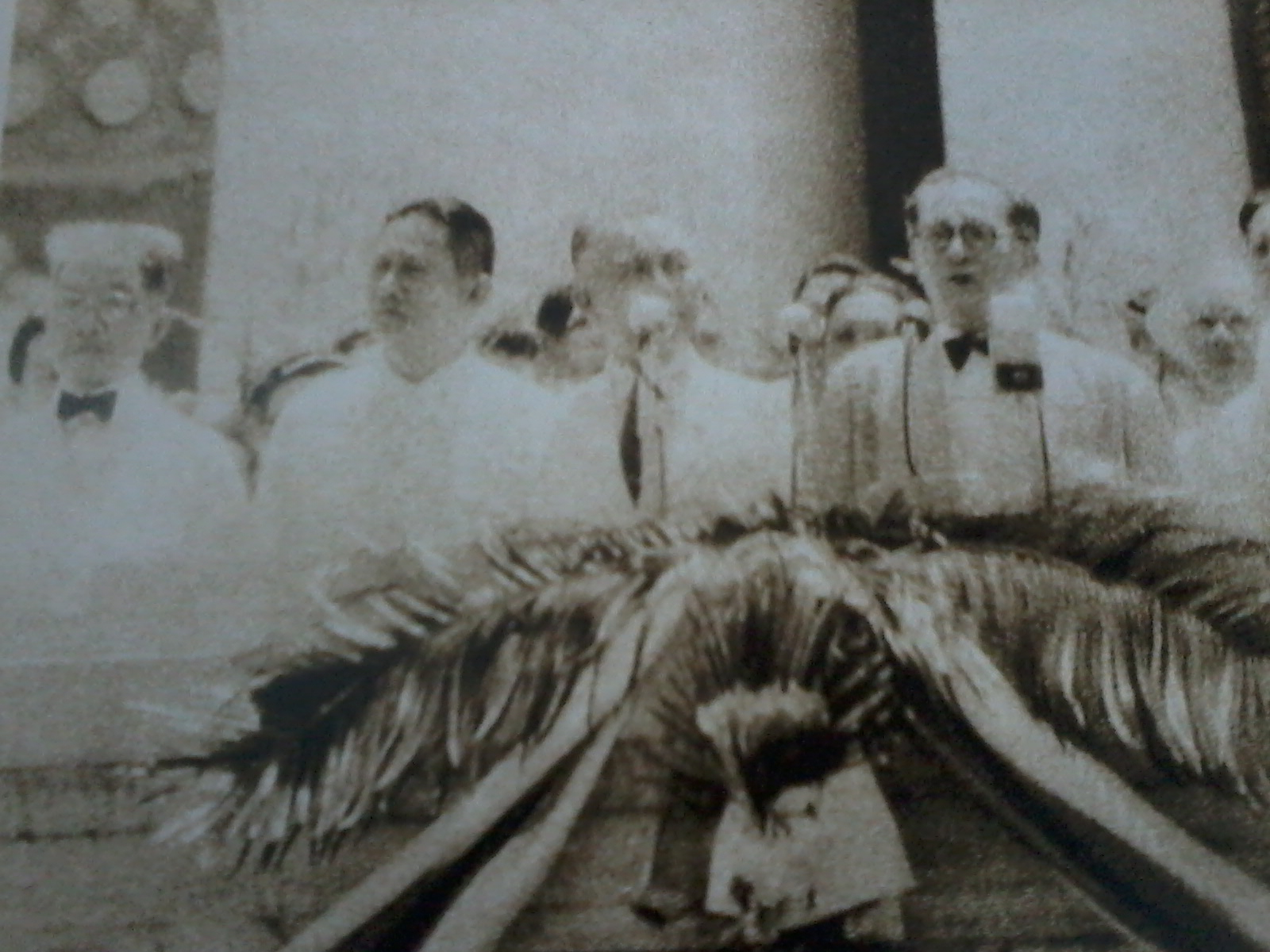
Aguinaldo (extreme left) with other members of the Japanese puppet government, 1943

Following the retreat of American forces, Aguinaldo continued his collaboration with the Japanese. He was appointed as a member of both the provisional Council of State as well as the Preparatory Committee for Philippine Independence, which was tasked with creating a new constitution for a Japanese puppet state in the Philippines. Aguinaldo also played a key role in the Kempeitai's campaign to suppress anti-Japanese resistance, urging guerrilla fighters to lay down their arms and surrender to Japan. Aguinaldo was present at the inauguration ceremony of the Second Philippine Republic on October 14, 1943, raising the flag with Artemio Ricarte, who had returned to the Philippines from Japan at the request of Japanese Prime Minister Hideki Tojo. The Japanese had considered making Aguinaldo president of the republic, a proposal which was supported by Aguinaldo himself, but he was ultimately passed up in favor of former Supreme Court justice Jose P. Laurel.

=== Capture, investigation, and amnesty ===
After US forces returned to the Philippines in October 1944, Aguinaldo went into hiding. During the Battle of Manila, however, members of the Marking Guerrillas resistance force were able to track his whereabouts, and arrested him on February 8, 1945. Aguinaldo was then placed under house arrest as the US Army's Counterintelligence Corps investigated his collaboration with the Japanese. Despite his claims that he had secretly remained loyal to the US throughout the war, and that he, as well as other Axis collaborators, had only been forced to collaborate with Japan under great duress and should therefore all be granted amnesty, on March 9 the People's Court of the Philippines charged Aguinaldo with 11 counts of treason for his "wholehearted" support for and collaboration with the Empire of Japan.

Aguinaldo was 77 when the US government recognized Philippine independence in the Treaty of Manila on July 4, 1946, in accordance with the Tydings–McDuffie Act of 1934. On January 28, 1948, Philippine president Manuel Roxas granted amnesty to all accused political and economic collaborators and, as a result, charges against Aguinaldo were dropped and he was never tried.

== Independence era ==
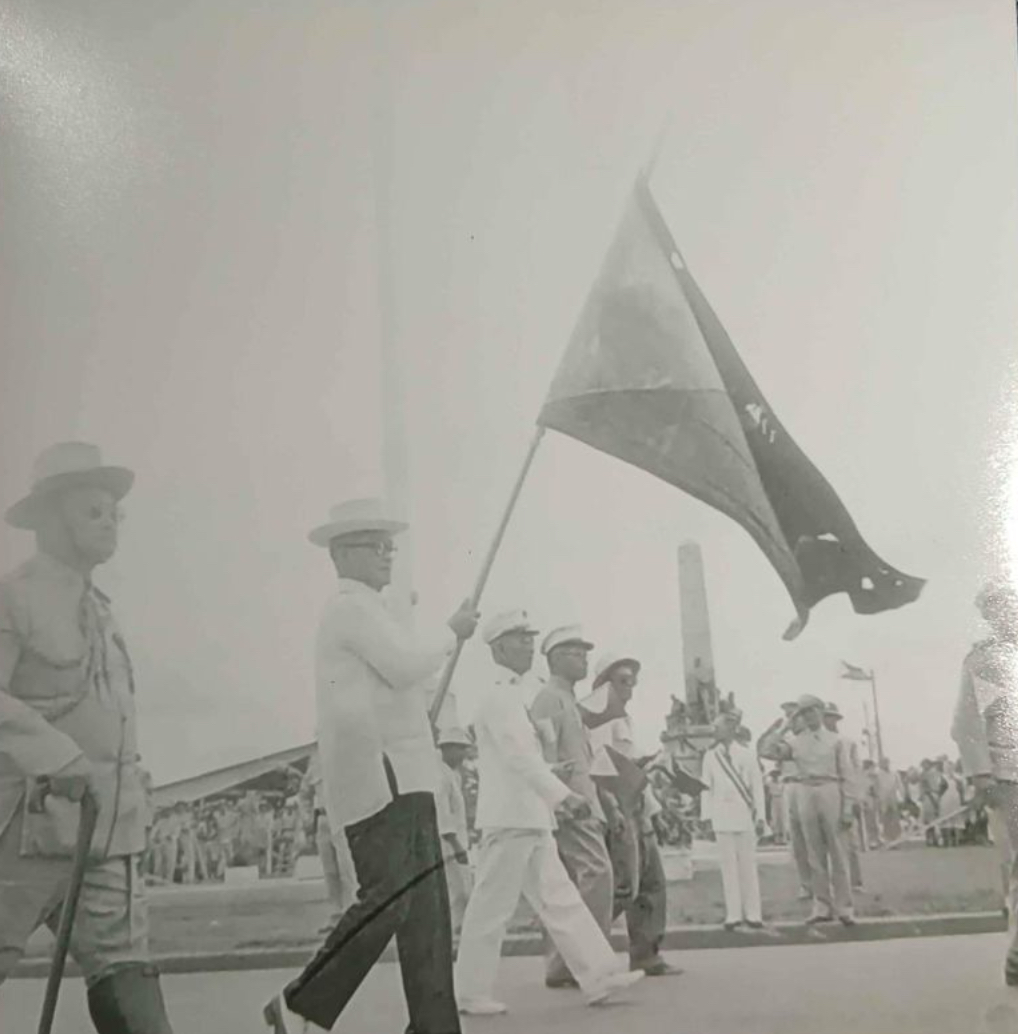
Aguinaldo holding the Philippine flag in Luneta, c. 1940s

In 1950, President Elpidio Quirino appointed Aguinaldo as a member of the Philippine Council of State, where he served a full term. He returned to retirement soon afterward and dedicated his time and attention to veteran soldiers' "interests and welfare." He was conferred an honorary Doctor of Laws, Honoris Causa, by the University of the Philippines in 1953. In 1958, when asked by the Filipino journalist Guillermo Gómez Rivera if he regretted anything in his life, Emilio Aguinaldo stated:

"Yes. I am regretful in large part for having risen up against Spain and, that is why, when the funerals were held in Manila of King Alfonso of Spain, I appeared at the cathedral for the surprise of the Spaniards. And they asked me why I had come to the funeral of the King of Spain against whom I rose up in rebellion... And, I told them that he is still my King because under Spain we were always Spanish subjects, or citizens, but now, under the United States, we are only a consumer market for their exports, if not pariahs, because they never made us citizens of any state of the United States... And the Spaniards made way for me and treated me as their brother on that significant day..."

— President Emilio Aguinaldo, Interview to Aguinaldo and his wife., December 16th, 1958. Cavite, Philippines.

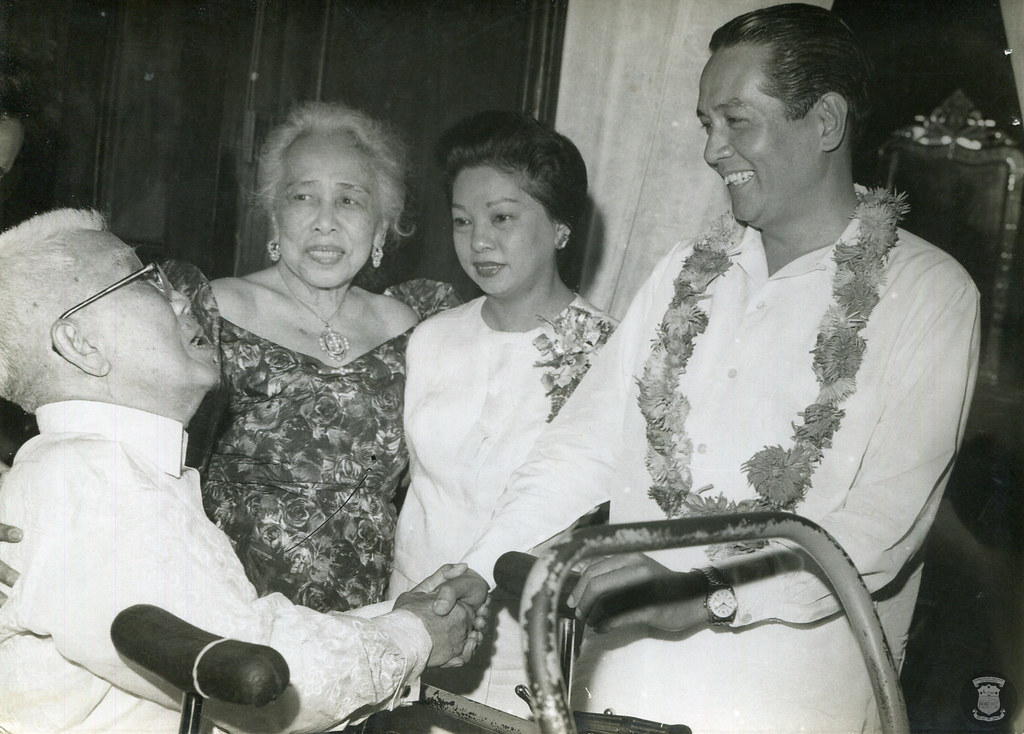
Aguinaldo (left) shaking hands with President Diosdado Macapagal (right)

On May 12, 1962, President Diosdado Macapagal changed the celebration of Independence Day from July 4 to June 12 to honor Aguinaldo and the Revolution of 1898, rather than the establishment of the Insular Government of the Philippine Islands by the United States. Although in poor health by that point, Aguinaldo attended the 1962 Independence Day observances. On August 4, 1964, Republic Act No. 4166 officially proclaimed June 12 to be Philippine Independence Day and renamed the Fourth of July holiday as "Philippine Republic Day".

== Personal life ==
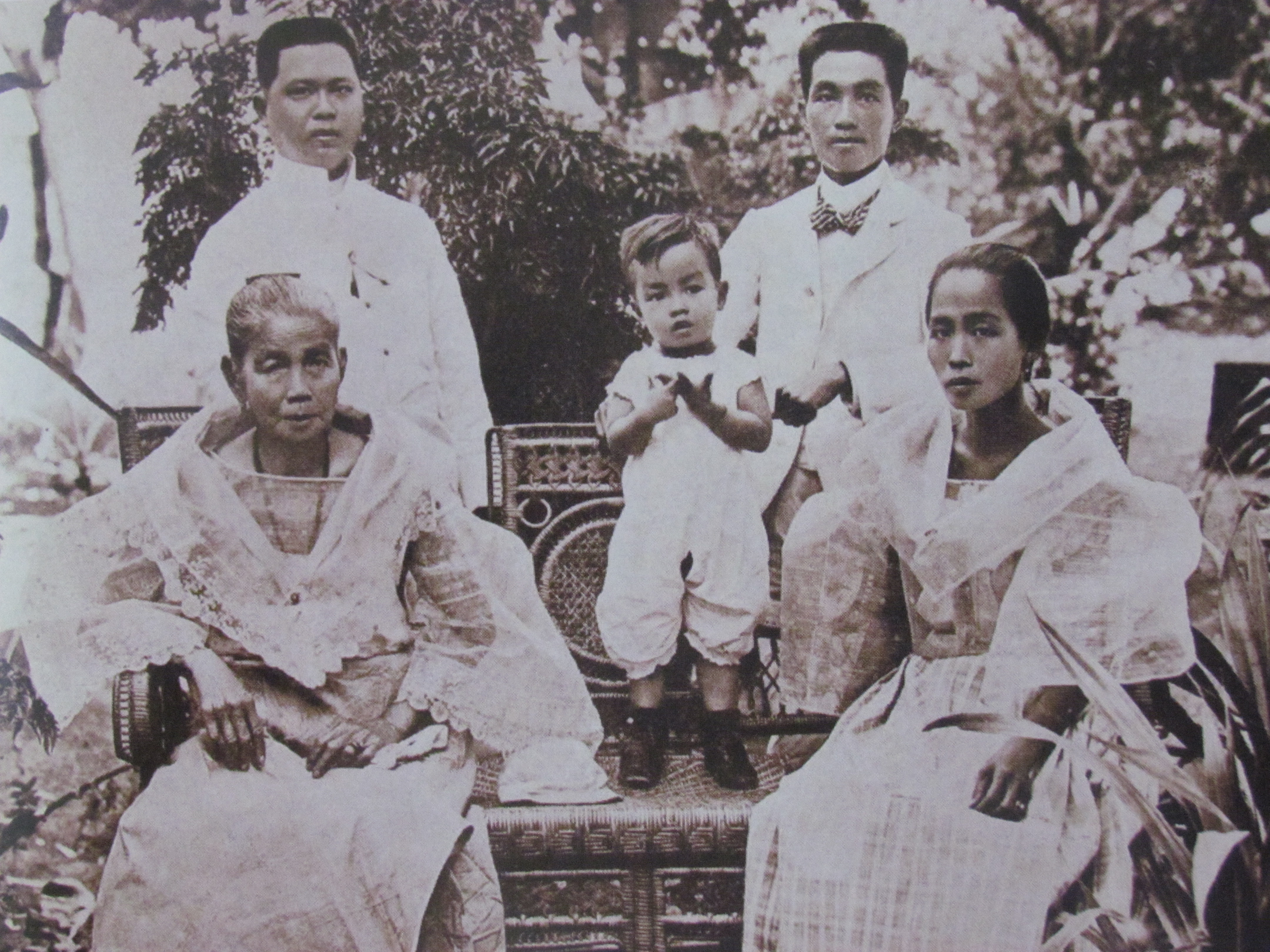
The Aguinaldo Family in 1902.

On January 1, 1896, he married his first wife, Hilaria del Rosario (1877–1921). They had five children: Carmen Aguinaldo-Melencio, Emilio "Jun" R. Aguinaldo Jr., Maria Aguinaldo-Poblete, Cristina Aguinaldo-Suntay, and Miguel Aguinaldo. Hilaria died of pulmonary tuberculosis on March 6, 1921, at the age of 44. A copy of her 1920 Last Will and Testament stated that she and Aguinaldo were separated for 15 years at the time the document was crafted. Based on the document, the separation happened in 1905.

Nine years after Hilaria's death, on July 14, 1930, Aguinaldo married his second wife, Maria Agoncillo (1879–1963), at Barasoain Church. She died on May 29, 1963, a year before Aguinaldo himself.

His grandsons Emilio B. Aguinaldo III and Reynaldo Aguinaldo served three terms as mayor (2007–2016) and vice-mayor of his hometown Kawit, Cavite, respectively. A granddaughter, Ameurfina Melencio-Herrera, was appointed Associate Justice of the Supreme Court of the Philippines, serving from 1979 to 1992. One of his great-grandsons, Joseph Emilio Abaya, served as a member of the Philippine House of Representatives and represented Cavite's first district, which contained their hometown, Kawit, from 2004 to 2012, and he was appointed Secretary of Transportation and Communications in 2012, a post he that served in until 2016. Another great-grandson, Emilio "Orange" M. Aguinaldo IV, married ABS-CBN news reporter Bernadette Sembrano in 2007. His great-granddaughter, Lizzie Aguinaldo, is a singer under Star Music.

During the revolt against Spain and subsequent conflicts with American forces, Aguinaldo supported the Philippine Independent Church. He became a long-time member, but reverted to Roman Catholicism later in life.

== Death and legacy ==
"We are confident that his struggle for Philippine independence, his love of freedom and his devotion to country will continue to inspire his people. His monument is the Republic of the Philippines."

— United States President Lyndon B. Johnson quoted in The New York Times February 6, 1964

"He was the very incarnation of the Filipino desire for liberty and freedom, and his country owes him much. He was a lifelong friend of mine and his death saddens me."

— General Douglas MacArthur, quoted in The New York Times February 6, 1964

Aguinaldo was rushed to Veterans Memorial Medical Center (VMMC) in Quezon City on October 5, 1962, under the care of Dr. Juana Blanco Fernandez, where he stayed for 469 days. He died of coronary thrombosis on February 6, 1964, at 3:05 am PHT, one month before his 95th birthday. (Note: Aguinaldo died 2 months, 15 days after the The Assassination of John F. Kennedy and 2 months before Douglas MacArthur’s Death.) Although Aguinaldo had renounced his Roman Catholic faith when battling against Spanish rule, he reconciled with the Church and received the last rites from VMMC's Catholic chaplain. A year before his death, he had donated his lot and mansion to the government. The property now serves as a shrine to "perpetuate the spirit of the Revolution of 1896."

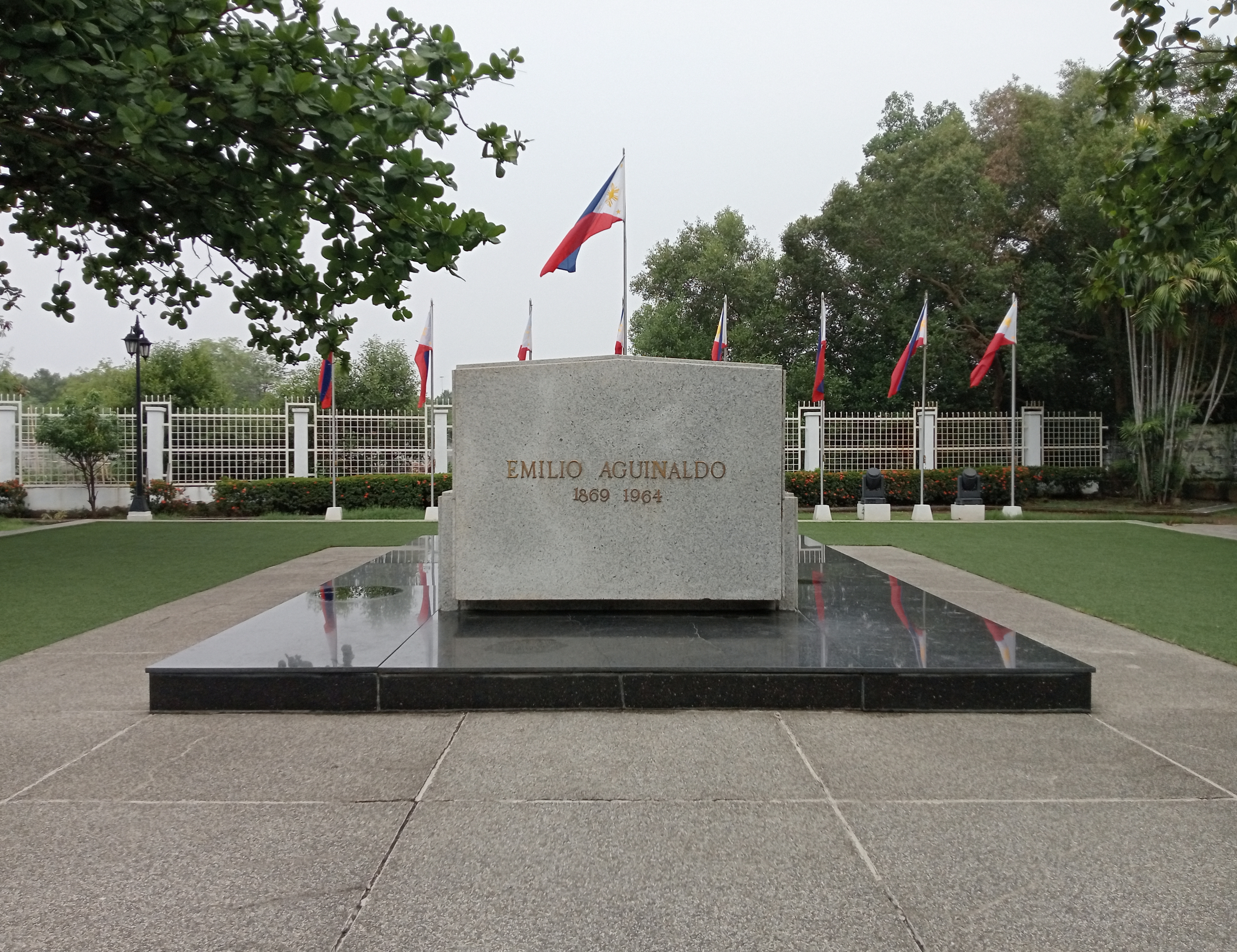
Tomb of Emilio Aguinaldo in Kawit, Cavite

Philippine President Diosdado Macapagal declared February 6 to 20, 1964 as "period of national mourning" over Aguinaldo's death. Aguinaldo was accorded a state funeral. His remains lay in state at his residence in Kawit from February 6 to 11, and then at Malacañang Palace from February 11 to 14. On February 14, his remains were brought to Manila Cathedral for a requiem mass in the morning presided over by Manila Archbishop, Cardinal Rufino Santos, and then to the Legislative Building for public viewing and necrological service on the next day. From Manila, his remains were returned to Kawit on February 15 for a vigil mass and a final requiem mass in the morning of the next day at Kawit Church. His remains were finally interred at the grounds of his residence in Kawit, Cavite.

Aguinaldo's book Mga Gunita ng Himagsikan (Memoirs of the Revolution) was published in 1964. A second publication was made in 1998 for the 100th anniversary of Philippine Independence.

According to Larry M. Henares of the Manila Standard, a consensus had formed by the late 20th century that Aguinaldo was the greatest president in Philippine history for his executory role in the Philippine Revolution's victory against Spain and his struggle to maintain the nation's independence during the Philippine–American War.

== Honors ==
- : Quezon Service Cross – (June 12, 1956)
- : Philippine Legion of Honor, Chief Commander – (1957)
- : Presidential Medal of Merit – (July 2, 1955)
- : The Order of the Knights of Rizal, Knight Grand Cross of Rizal – KGCR.

== Commemoration ==
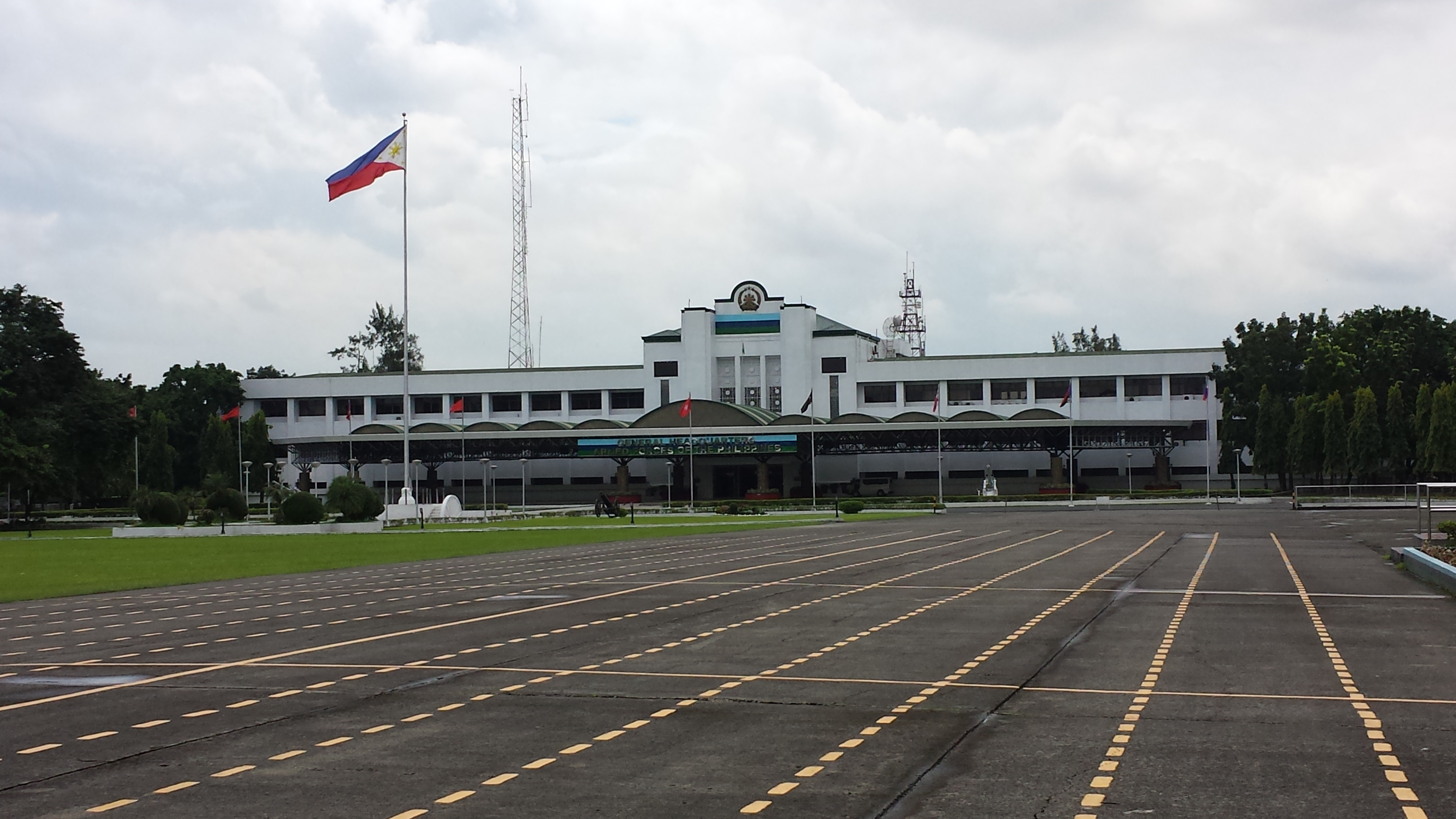
General Headquarters Building of the AFP at Camp General Emilio Aguinaldo, Quezon City.

- In 1957, Emilio Aguinaldo College was established as a private, non-sectarian institute of education and named after Aguinaldo. The EAC Generals are its varsity teams on which the nicknamed Generals is to honors President-General Emilio Aguinaldo.
- In 1965, Camp Murphy, a military general headquarters (GHQ) of the Armed Forces of the Philippines, was legally renamed after Aguinaldo.
- In 1965, President Diosdado Macapagal signed Republic Act No. 4346, which renamed the municipality of Bailen, Cavite as General Emilio Aguinaldo.
- In 1985, BRP General Emilio Aguinaldo was launched and became the lead ship of the General Emilio Aguinaldo class patrol vessel of the Philippine Navy. The ship, along with her only sistership BRP General Antonio Luna, was made in the Cavite Naval Ship Yard.
- In 1985, Aguinaldo Museum was established as history museum in Baguio by Cristina Suntay.

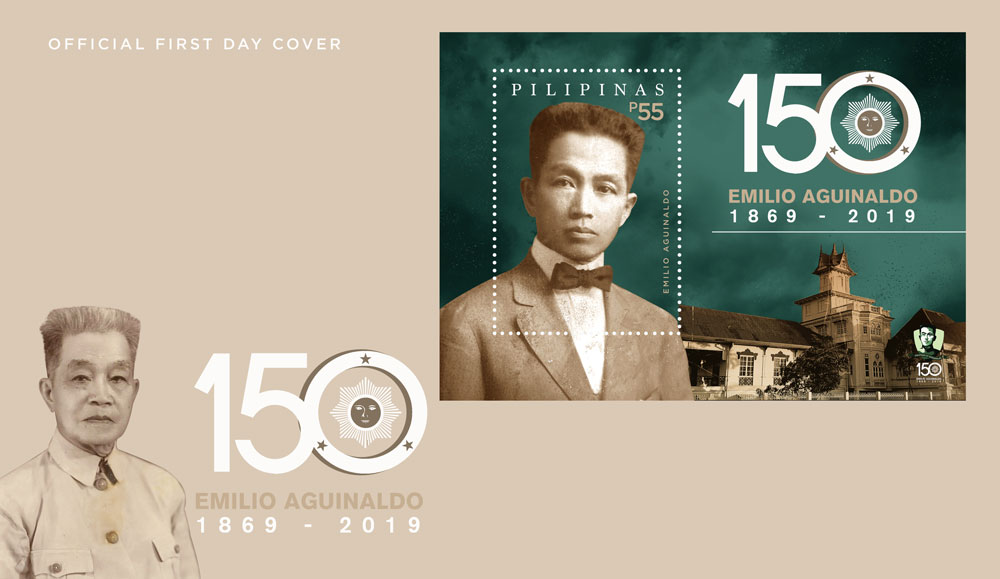
Aguinaldo on a 2019 stamp sheet of the Philippines.

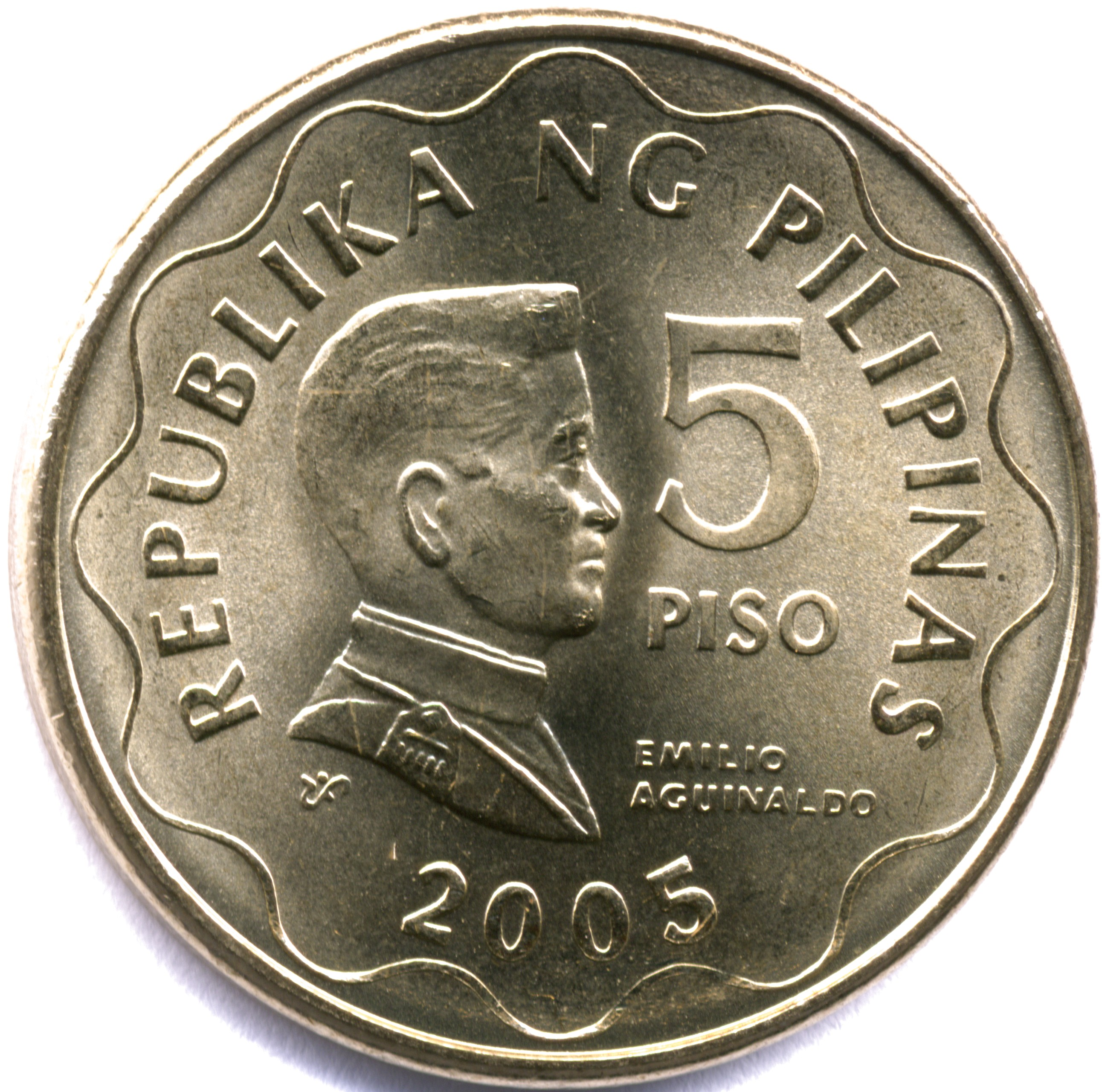
Aguinaldo on the 5-peso coin from the BSP Coin Series (1995–2017).

- In 1985, Bangko Sentral ng Pilipinas issued a new 5-peso bill depicting a portrait of Aguinaldo on the obverse side. The reverse side features the declaration of the Philippine independence on June 12, 1898. Printing was discontinued in 1995, to give way for the release of ₱5.00 coin on December of that year with an obverse side featuring a profile of Aguinaldo. In 2017, Andres Bonifacio officially replaced Aguinaldo on the same coin.
- In 1999, Aguinaldo International School Manila was established as a private school in Ermita, Manila and is named after Aguinaldo.
- In 2018, President Rodrigo Duterte declared March 22, 2019, as "Emilio Aguinaldo Day" to commemorate Aguinaldo's birth anniversary.
- The Aguinaldo Highway is a highway passing through the busiest towns and cities of Cavite.
- The Aguinaldo Hill, located at Barangay Asibanglan-Pinukpuk Road at Allaguia junction, was used as a common post by Aguinaldo during the Philippine–American War.

== Written works ==
- Reseña verídica de la revolución filipina, 1899
- Talang Buhay ng Supremo And. Bonifacio sa Kabite, 1940's
- A Second Look at America, 1957
- Mga Gunita ng Himagsikan, 1964
- My Memoirs, 1967

== Portrayals ==
In 1931, an American Pre-Code documentary film, Around the World in 80 Minutes with Douglas Fairbanks, had Douglas Fairbanks pose and speak for the camera as he talked with Aguinaldo.

Aguinaldo was also portrayed in various films that featured or centered on the Revolution. He was portrayed by the following actors in these films:

- 1926 – Charles Stevens in Across the Pacific
- 1985 – Roy Lachica in Virgin Forest
- 1993 – Mike Lloren in Sakay
- 1996 – Raymond Alsona in Bayani.
- 1997 – Joel Torre in Tirad Pass: The Story of Gen. Gregorio del Pilar.
- 2008 – Johnny Solomon in Baler.
- 2008 – Karl Medina in Gregorio del Pilar: Bayani o Berdugo? (Gregorio del Pilar: A Hero or Executioner?), an episode of Case Unclosed.
- 2010 – Lance Raymundo in Ang Paglilitis ni Andres Bonifacio.
- 2010 – Dennis Trillo in the official "Lupang Hinirang" music video produced by GMA Network.
- 2011 – Carlos Morales in Watawat.
- 2012 – Jericho Ejercito and E.R. Ejercito in El Presidente
- 2013 – Nico Antonio in Katipunan.
- 2014 – Jun Nayra in Bonifacio: Ang Unang Pangulo.
- 2015 – Alex Medina in Apolinario Mabini: Talino at Paninindigan, a documentary film.
- 2015 – Mon Confiado in Heneral Luna and its sequels, Goyo: The Boy General (2018) and Quezon (2025).
- 2018 – Gonzalo Gonzalez in Quezon's Game.
- 2018 – Jan Crezul Balodong in Maypagasa: Ang Bantayog ni Andres Bonifacio a documentary film.
- 2018 – Jolo Revilla in Agosto Uno, Kasaysayang Nakalimutan a documentary film.

== See also ==
- Rizal Day
- Tagalog people
- Generalissimo
- Philippine Revolutionary Army

== Bibliography ==
- Agoncillo, Teodor A. (1990). History of the Filipino people (8th ed.). Quezon City: Garotech. ISBN 978-9718711064.
- Ara, Satoshi (2015). "Emilio Aguinaldo under American and Japanese Rule Submission for Independence?" (PDF). Philippine Studies. 63 (2). Ateneo de Manila University: 161–192. doi:10.1353/phs.2015.0019. JSTOR 24672333. S2CID 128515904.
- Guerrero, Milagros; Schumacher, John (1998). Dalisay, Jose Y. (ed.). Kasaysayan: The Story of the Filipino People. Vol. 5: Reform and Revolution. Project Director: Teresa Maria Custudio. Manila / Pleasantville NY: Asia Publishing Company, Limited (Reader's Digest). ISBN 9622582281. OCLC 39734321. Vol 1 The Philippine Archipelago; Vol 2 The earliest Filipinos; Vol 3 The Spanish conquest; Vol 4 Life in the colony; Vol 5 Reform and revolution; Vol 6 Under stars and stripes; Vol 7 The Japanese occupation; Vol 8 Up from the ashes; Vol 9 A nation reborn; Vol 10 A timeline of Philippine history.
- Guevara, Sulpicio, ed. (1972) [1898]. The laws of the first Philippine Republic (the laws of Malolos) 1898–1899. English translation by Sulpicio Guevara. Manila: National Historical Commission. ISBN 9715380557. OCLC 715140.
- Halstead, Murat (1898). The Story of the Philippines and Our New Possessions, Including the Ladrones, Hawaii, Cuba and Porto Rico.
- Jose, Vivencio R. (1972). The Rise and Fall of Antonio Luna. University of the Philippines. ISBN 978-971-17-0700-2.
- Karnow, Stanley (1989). In Our Image: America's Empire in the Philippines. Random House. ISBN 978-0394549750.
- Kalaw, Maximo Manguiat (1926). The Development of Philippine Politics, 1872–1920. Manila: Oriental Commercial Co. OCLC 723615963.
- Sullivan, D. (2022). Capturing Aguinaldo: The Daring Raid to Seize the Philippine President at the Dawn of the American Century. Globe Pequot. ISBN 978-0-8117-7153-5.
- Wolff, Leon (2006). Little Brown Brother. Wolff Productions. ISBN 978-1-58288-209-3.
- Zaide, Sonia M (1999). The Philippines: A Unique Nation (2nd ed.). All-Nations Publishing. ISBN 978-9716420715.

Offices and distinctions
Political offices
New title Republic declared	President of the Philippines; 1898–1901	Vacant Office nullified by the United States by Spain Title next held by Manuel L. Quezon
Military offices
Preceded by Antonio Luna	Commanding General of the Philippine Revolutionary Army; 1899–1901	Succeeded by Jose de los Reyes as Chief of Staff of the Armed Forces of the Philippines
