= María Agoncillo =

Second wife of Emilio Aguinaldo

- Born: María Agoncillo y Reyes; February 15, 1879; Taal, Batangas, Captaincy General of the Philippines
- Died: May 29, 1963 (aged 84); Quezon City, Philippines
- Resting place: La Loma Cemetery
- Spouse: Emilio Aguinaldo (m. 1930)
- Parent(s): Flaviano Agoncillo; Michaela Reyes
- Relatives: Felipe Agoncillo (uncle)

María Reyes Agoncillo-Aguinaldo (February 15, 1879 – May 29, 1963) was the second wife of Emilio Aguinaldo, the revolutionary leader and first President of the Philippines. A member of the prominent Agoncillo family of Batangas, she married Aguinaldo in 1930 and remained his companion throughout his later years until her death in 1963.

== Early life and family ==
María Agoncillo was born on February 15, 1879, in the heritage town of Taal, Batangas, during the Spanish colonial period. Her parents were Flaviano Agoncillo y Encarnación and Michaela Reyes.

She belonged to the affluent and historically significant Agoncillo clan of Batangas. Notably, she was the niece of Felipe Agoncillo, the pioneering Filipino lawyer and diplomat who represented the First Philippine Republic and negotiated on its behalf in Paris and Washington, D.C., during the drafting of the Treaty of Paris (1898).

== Marriage to Emilio Aguinaldo ==
Emilio Aguinaldo's first wife, Hilaria del Rosario, died of leprosy in 1921. Nine years after her passing, Aguinaldo, then 61 years old, sought the hand of the 51-year-old Agoncillo. The couple was officially married on July 14, 1930, at the historic Barasoain Church in Malolos, Bulacan—the very same church where the First Philippine Republic and the Malolos Congress were established in 1899.

Throughout their marriage, Agoncillo stood by the former president during various pivotal eras of modern Philippine history, including the Philippine Commonwealth period, the Japanese occupation during World War II, and the post-war independence years. In 1962, the elderly couple witnessed President Diosdado Macapagal's historic executive decree that restored the actual date of the Philippine declaration of independence to June 12, fulfilling a lifelong advocacy of Aguinaldo.

== Death ==
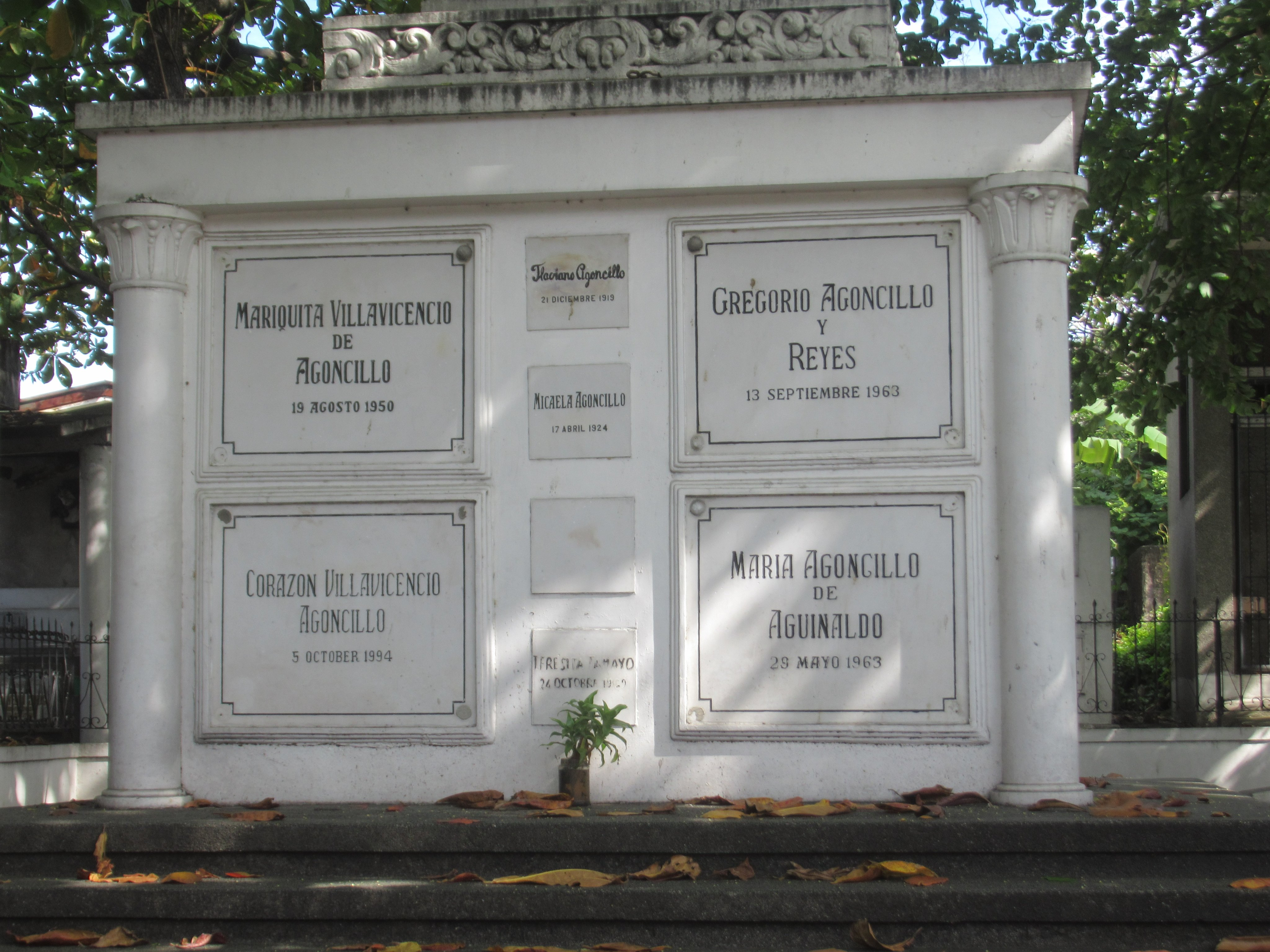
Aguinaldo second wife, Maria Agoncillo's, Gregorio Reyes Agoncillo & Maria Marella Villavicencio's graves at La Loma Cemetery.

María Agoncillo-Aguinaldo passed away on May 29, 1963, at the Veterans Memorial Hospital in Quezon City, at the age of 84. She predeceased her husband, General Aguinaldo, who died of coronary thrombosis less than a year later on February 6, 1964.

== In popular culture ==
Agoncillo was portrayed by Philippine National Artist for Film Nora Aunor in the 2012 historical epic film El Presidente, which dramatized the life and times of Emilio Aguinaldo.

== See also ==
- Emilio Aguinaldo
- Marcela Agoncillo
- Hilaria del Rosario de Aguinaldo
