= Aguinaldo Museum =

- Established: 1985
- Location: Baguio, Philippines
- Coordinates: 16°24′44″N 120°36′03″E
- Type: History museum
- Key holdings: First Philippine flag

The Gen. Emilio Aguinaldo Museum (Filipino: Museo ni Emilio Aguinaldo) or simply known as the Aguinaldo Museum is a history museum in Baguio, Philippines.

== History ==
House of History, the Aguinaldo Mansion is the locus of a focal point in the unfolding of Philippine history. Constructed in 1845, the original structure of the house was of nipa-and-thatch material. It was reconstructed four years later using a variety of Philippine hardwood. By the 1920s, major renovation saw the construction of the tower and the symbolic balcony of the house. It was also during this period that the house was refurbished with architectural details of nationalistic themes, masonic symbols, and art nouveau and art deco’s artistic style prevalent during the early 20th century. The house where the president lived was donated to the Filipino people in 1963, a year before he died. In 1964, the house was placed under the care of the National Museum of the Philippines and was declared a national shrine through Republic Act No 4039. By 1972, Executive Order No 370 transferred the shrine under the care and maintenance of the National Historical Commission. Today, the house continues to emanate the vision of a free and proud nation as it perpetuates the ideals of the 1896 Revolution and the 1898 Proclamation of Philippine Independence.

== Exhibits ==
=== First Philippine Flag ===
Digital replica of the first Philippine flag

The first Philippine flag is kept in the museum and is available for public viewing. The century-old flag is being preserved by the museum management following instructions from the Smithsonian Institution in a collaborative consultation. The regulated temperature and dim lighting in the room where the flag is displayed is intended to preserve the flag. In 2011 it was reported that the flag was in "good viewing state" and would remain so for 20 to 30 years.

=== Collection ===
The Museo ni Emilio Aguinaldo’s collection covers a variety of museum objects. The ground level of the house is a permanent exhibit on the role of Cavite during the revolution. It presents the life of the general, Cavite during the Spanish colonial period, and the revolution against Spain until the proclamation of independence on June 12, 1898. It also covers the aftermath of the revolution until the Philippines’ war against the United States. The second level is the living space of the house. Similar to the traditional bahay na bato structure of the 19th century; the living room, the bedrooms, dining area and kitchen can all be found in this level. These rooms house 19th century and early 20th century furniture and details of the art nouveau and art deco period of the past. Notable are the mesa altar, large dining table, Ah Tay bed and secret compartments oblivious to regular guests.

Gallery 1. Aguinaldo’s Early Years up to the Katipunan Gallery II. The Revolution and the Declaration of Independence Gallery III. The Road to the First Republic Gallery IV. Filipino – American War

https://nhcp.gov.ph/museums/emilio-aguinaldo-shrine/wppaspec/oc1/cv0/ab35/pt426
