= Battle of Imus =

Battle Between Spain and the Philippines

- Part of the Philippine Revolution
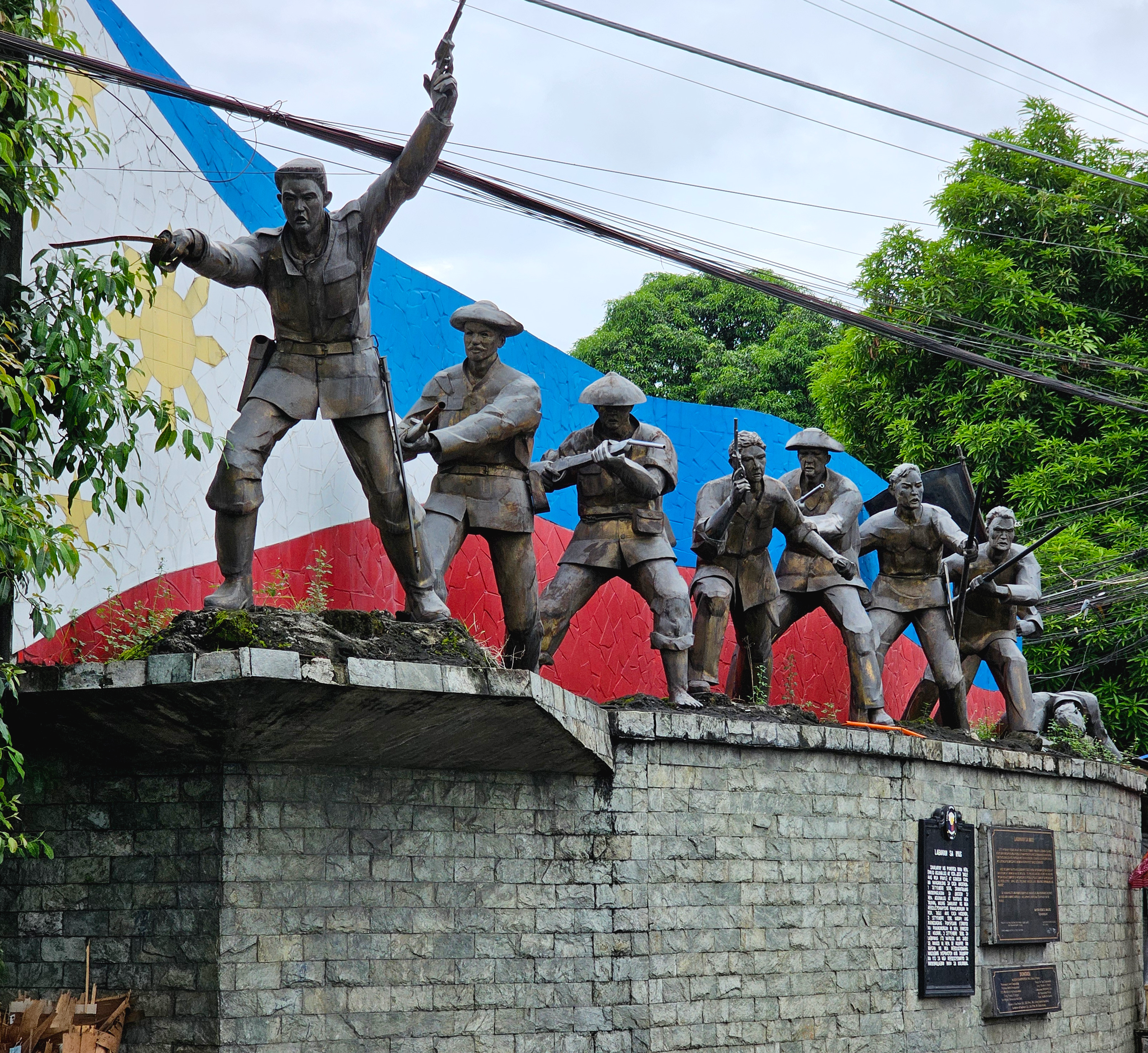
- Monument of the battle in Imus
Date	September 1–3, 1896
Location	Imus, Cavite, Philippines
Result	Filipino victory

Belligerents
Katipunan: Magdalo	Spanish Empire: Guardia Civil

Commanders and leaders
Emilio Aguinaldo; Baldomero Aguinaldo; Candido Tirona; Jose Tagle; Guillermo Samoy †	Ramón Blanco; Ernesto de Aguirre; Jose Togores

Strength
Initial: 500 men At the time of the siege: 1,000 men	30 Civil Guard militia within Imus; 3,000 infantry and 500 cavalry as reinforcements

Casualties and losses
Unknown, heavy	Massive, entire engaging force almost destroyed

The Battle of Imus (Filipino: Labanan sa Imus, Spanish: Batalla de Imus), or the Siege of Imus (Filipino: Pagkubkob sa Imus, Spanish: El Cerco de Imus), was the first major battle of the Philippine revolution against the Spanish colonial government in the province of Cavite. It was fought between September 1–3, 1896 at Imus, Cavite province in the Philippines, right after Bonifacio's attack on the gunpowder magazine at the Battle of San Juan del Monte in Manila.

== Background ==
The revolution began in Cavite province shortly after it joined the pro-independence Katipunan revolutionary movement under Andres Bonifacio. Emilio Aguinaldo began the revolution in the province by staging the Kawit Revolt on August 31, 1896. He had gathered more men and armament for the imminent combat with the Spanish troops stationed in the province, and as time went on, he and his men destroyed several Spanish units along the way, prompting the Spaniards to meet the revolutionaries in battle. The Spanish military commander in the province, Brigadier General Ernesto de Aguirre, felt confident that he could defeat the Caviteño fighters as his units are more properly armed and fed.

The town of Imus was the rebels' great strategic point. The town itself, situated in the center of a large well-watered plain, surrounded by agricultural land with a mere collection of wooded and bamboo dwellings. The distance from Manila, in straight line, would be about 14 miles, with good roads leading to the bay-shore towns. The people were very poor, being tenants or dependents of the friars, hence the only building of importance was the estate house of the Recollects (on what is now Cuartel or Camp Pantaleon Garcia). This estate house, situated in the middle of a compound surrounded by massive high walls, was a fortress through the eyes of the natives.

== Prelude ==
Baldomero Aguinaldo, President of the Magdalo Council, led the first attack on Imus. Baldomero Aguinaldo rallied forth to Imus with a handful of men armed only with spears and bolos to test the reflexes of the Spanish defenders of the town. Emilio Aguinaldo and his men covered the rear in Binakayan against a possible attack coming from the marines stationed in Polverin in Kulaute. A contingent of civil guards on patrol, however, intercepted Aguinaldo and his men before they could make their way into the town plaza. A running battle ensued, resulting in a rout of the rebel forces. Aguinaldo, left isolated on the battlefield, escaped capture by feigning death.

== Battle ==
=== Opening phase ===
On the morning of Tuesday, September 1, Jose Tagle, the Captain Municipal of Imus with a force of around 100 men, went to Kawit to seek the help of Aguinaldo. The Spaniards, according to Tagle, had entrenched themselves in the church, and it would need to mobilize all available forces.

=== Initial attacks ===
The first to be attacked was the church and convent where Aguinaldo was told the friars and civil guards had barricaded themselves.

=== Failed Imus Estate House attack ===
Aguinaldo and his men braced themselves for the assault on the estate house with its fortification-like walls providing the friars and civil guards the protection against rebel attack. The Spaniards, led by Fray Eduarte were waiting for the rebel assault intending to wait out the reinforcements from Manila. Some rebels fired by their number, tried to rush the estate house, but they were met with gunfire that sent them back.

=== Regrouping ===
Aguinaldo regrouped his men and changed tactics. Aguinaldo and some of his men tore a hole through the thin walls and ran straight to the rice warehouses adjoining the estate house where the friars and the civil guards had taken sanctuary and poured petroleum on it. Rafael Sabater from Imus applied a torch. The refugees were unable to stand the thick smoke and raging fire dashing out of the warehouse to captivity.

In the words of John Foreman,

After a siege, which lasted long enough for General Blanco to have sent troops against them, the rebels captured Imus estate-house on September 1, and erected barricades there. Thirteen of the priests fell into their hands. They cut trenches and threw up earthworks in several of the main roads of the province, and strengthened their position at Novaleta. Marauding parties were sent out everywhere to steal the crops and live-stock, which were conveyed in large quantities to Imus. Some of the captured priests were treated most barbarously. One was cut up piecemeal; another was saturated with petroleum and set on fire; and a third was bathed in oil and fried on a bamboo spit run through the length of his body. There was a Requiem Mass for this event.

=== Revolutionaries prepare for a major Spanish counterattack ===
My brother Katipuneros and beloved countrymen, God is on our side in this fight against Spain. He spared my life so that I can be with you to continue the fight. God knows that we have only one purpose: to free our country from alien bondage. Our failure at Bacoor was a blessing in disguise, because had not the friars heard the shots in Bacoor they would not have left the hacienda, neither could we have obtained those arms and ammunition that you and Colonel Tagle, raised by one rank, your brave leader, were able to get. These arms shall be used in our future battles.

— Emilio Aguinaldo

=== Turn of the tide ===
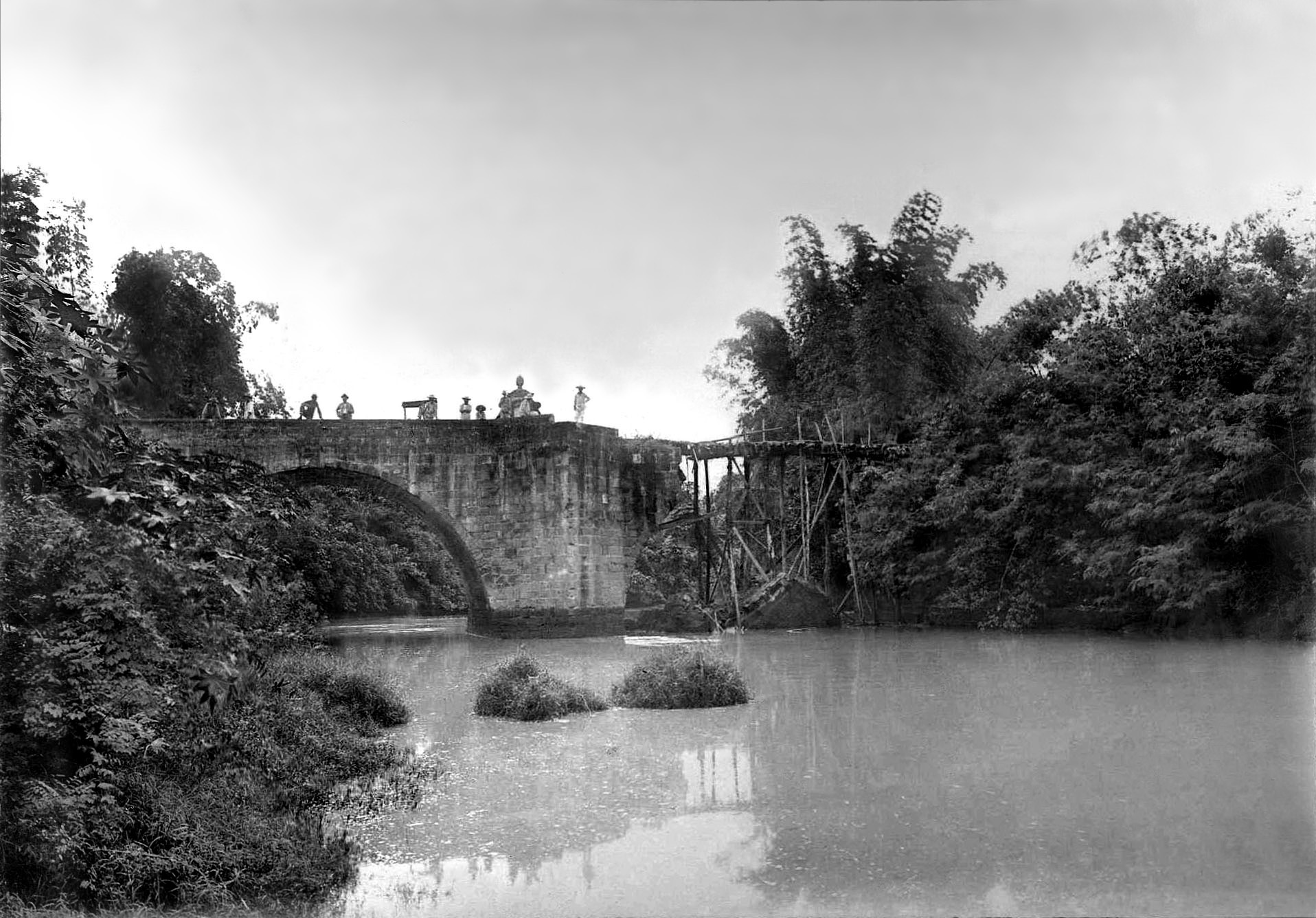
The Bridge of Isabel II in 1899 with the missing northern span blown up by the revolutionaries, temporarily replaced by a wooden plank.

On September 3, the Spanish column advanced upon Imus under cover of heavy artillery gunfire.

=== Final and decisive blow ===
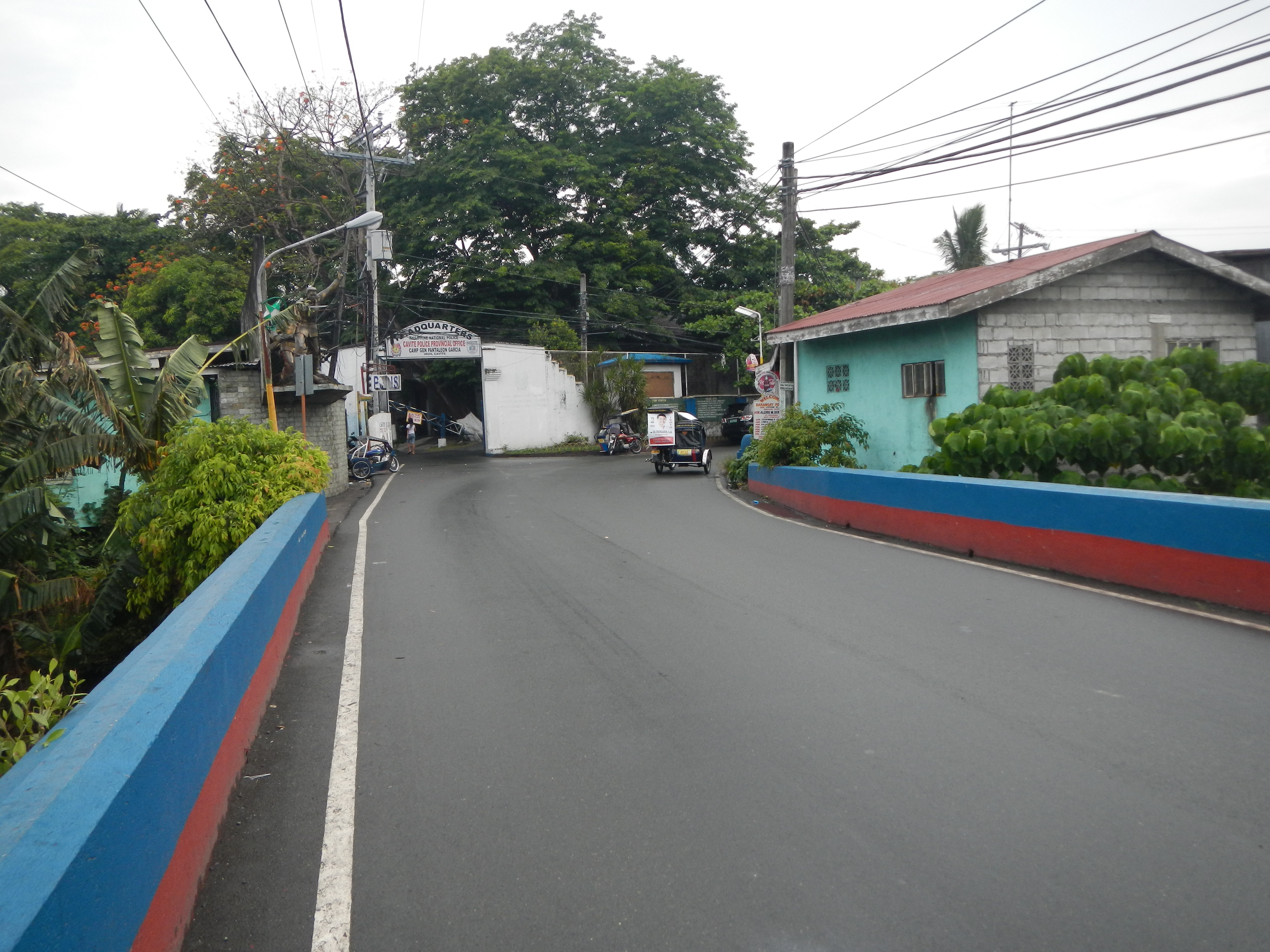
On the Bridge of Isabel II looking towards the location of the Estate House of the Recollects (now Camp Panataleon Garcia or Cuartel).

During the burning of the bushes surrounding the riverbanks, Aguinaldo realized he did not provide for his men to close down the rear of the bridge to seal the only escape route the Spaniards could take to save themselves. Aguinaldo then took some of his men to Presa Talon where the current was very strong, for him and his men to ford the river and head towards the other side of the bridge to cut off the only Spanish escape route. The first attempt at crossing the river failed because some men were swept by the strong current. However, a second crossing attempt was made with success.As soon as this was done, Aguinaldo and his men headed towards the other bridgehead at the Spanish rear, thus closing the trap. A fight ensued. General Aguirre fell from his horse and in his hurry to escape, left behind his "Sable de Mando" (command sabre) crafted in Toledo in 1869, which Aguinaldo managed to retrieve; the former was later killed by the pursuing Caviteño rebels. Because the year the said sabre was created was also his birth year, he used the sword during his engagements for the duration of the revolution.

== Aftermath ==
After the battle of Imus, and because Kawit was under bombardment from Cavite port and the Spanish gunboats at Manila, Aguinaldo transferred his seat of government to Imus. The first revolutionary government then had Baldomero Aguinaldo as president and Candido Tria Tirona as War Secretary and portfolios for finance, natural resources, agriculture and justice. Aguinaldo had upped his title to Jefe de Abanderado (Flag Lt. General). An armament factory, the Imus arsenal, was also set up in the town.

== Legacy ==
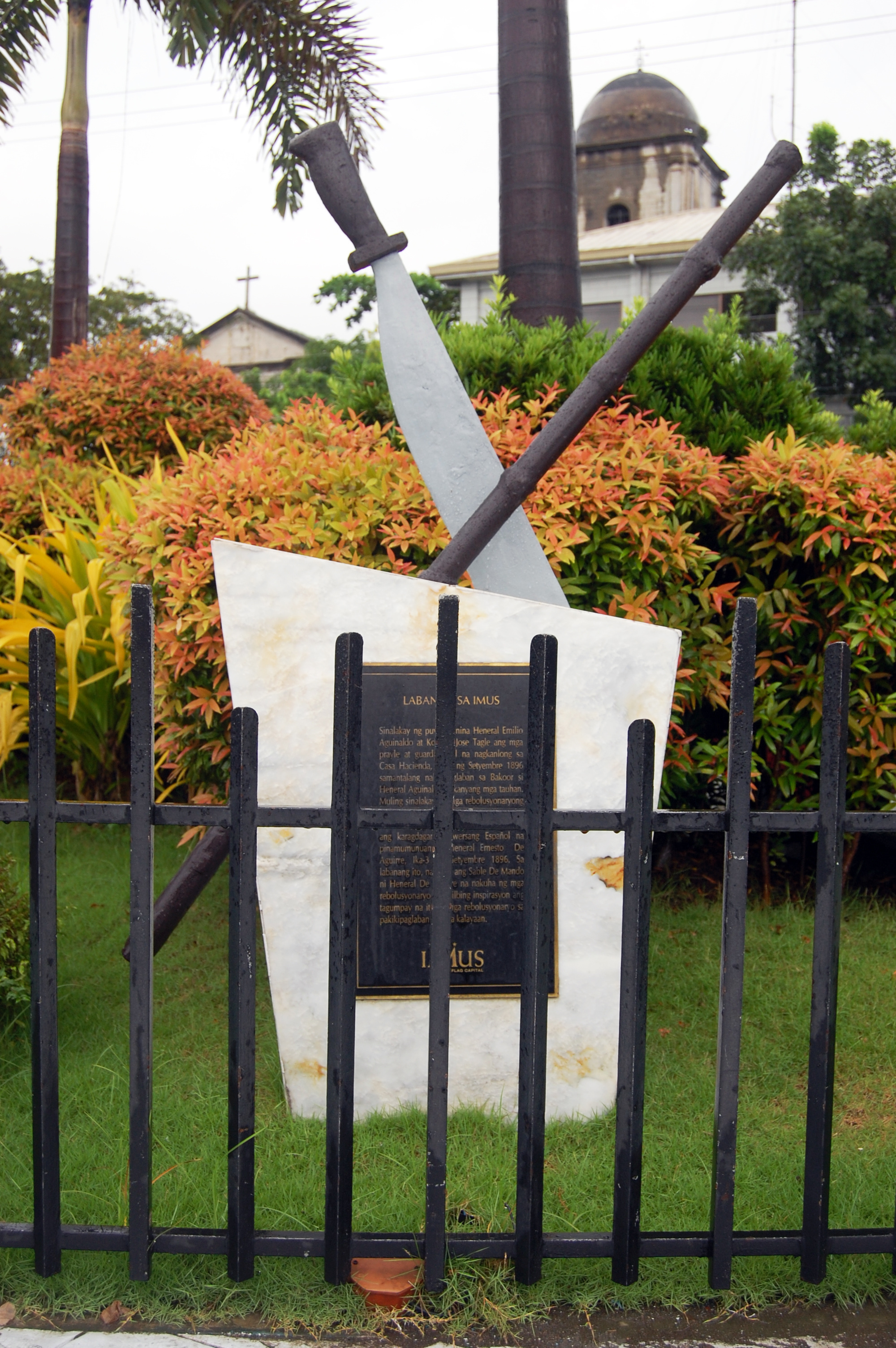
Marker for the Battle of Imus at the City Plaza.

Nick Joaquin, Filipino historian, spoke of Aguinaldo's victory in Imus as the "spark which started the revolt in Bulacan." According to him 300 Bulakan Katipuneros gathered to attack the Spanish garrison at the barrio of San Nicolas.

The rebel victory at the second Battle of Imus rekindled the fluttering spark of resistance inspired the revolutionaries.

== See also ==
- Battle of Binakayan and Dalahican
