= Kawit revolt =

1896 battle of the Philippine Revolution

- Part of the Philippine Revolution
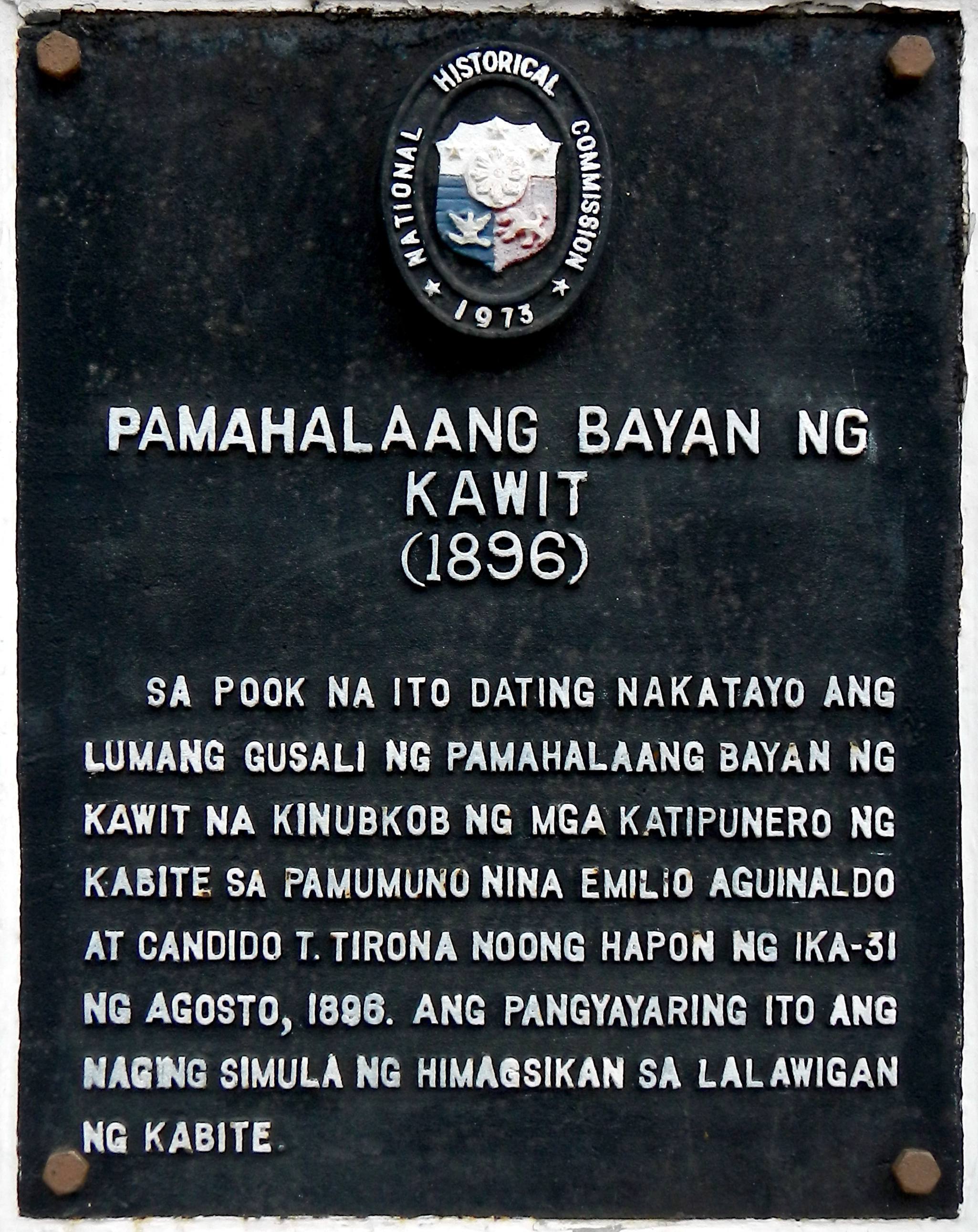
- 1973 national historical marker commemorating the revolt
Date	August 31, 1896
Location	Kawit, Cavite, Philippines
Result	Filipino victory

Belligerents
Katipunan: Magdalo	Spanish Empire: Guardia Civil

Commanders and leaders
Emilio Aguinaldo	Ramón Blanco (indirectly)

Strength
400 men	Civil Guards (numbers not defined)

Casualties and losses
None	None, several captured

The Kawit revolt was a short skirmish in the beginning of the revolution in Cavite. Gen. Emilio Aguinaldo, The First President of the Philippines, led some 400 men to the town hall of Kawit, guarded by a few Guardia Civil there. A few days after the revolt, Aguinaldo marched to Imus to meet the enemy in one of the great battles of the revolution.

== Prelude ==
After the outbreak of revolution in Manila, Aguinaldo, then Kawit mayor, was sent to Cavite City with a mission. Pretending to have been attacked by bandits at Kawit, he was requesting the governor of Cavite for more Civil Guards to fight off the rebels, however the governor did not give him men, saying that they were all in Manila. Aguinaldo persisted, asking for at least a hundred guns, again the governor said that they were all in Manila to fight the revolution there which began days earlier. Acting frustrated, Aguinaldo left the governor's mansion and traveled to Kawit. Aguinaldo's plan was a success. He, along with other revolutionaries planned to strip any Army personnel of their arms. At Kawit, there were only a few Civil Guardsmen and upon returning to the town hall, he quickly recruited as many men as he could for the revolutionary cause.

== Battle ==
On August 31, 1896, Aguinaldo marched with his army of bolomen to the town center of Kawit. Prior to the battle, Aguinaldo strictly ordered his men not to kill anyone in his hometown. Upon arriving at the town center, the guards armed with remingtons, unaware of events were caught completely by surprise and surrendered immediately. The guns there were captured and armed to the Katipuneros, the revolt was a major success for Aguinaldo and his men. Later that afternoon, they raised the Magdalo flag at the town hall to a large crowd of people from Kawit all assembled after hearing of their city's liberation.

== Aftermath ==
After a bloodless and successful revolt, Aguinaldo quickly armed his men and by September 1896, Aguinaldo had a major force of 400 men and they marched to the city of Imus to the south of Kawit, to Aguinaldo, Imus was a strategic place to capture because of its proximity to Manila. Slowly men began to follow Aguinaldo's army, passing by villages along the way, men of all ages donned their bolos, pistols and other weapons and joined the army, by the time they arrived at the bridge of Imus, Aguinaldo had 1,000 men, dishearted from a previous Imus attack led by Baldomero Aguinaldo, Aguinaldo thought of a clever psychological tactic to boost the morale of his men. Aside from the confidence from the Kawit revolt, Aguinaldo organised for a town band to march along with them, the band was playing the tune of the "Battalia de Jolo" and soon his men were in fighting spirit, receiving further news from an Imus colonel, Jose Tagle, with 100 men under his command, he fed Aguinaldo intelligence on the defenses at Imus, three days after meeting with Tagle, Aguinaldo reached Imus bridge. With knowledge of the enemy's plans, his men took up arms and fought.
