= BRP General Antonio Luna =

Philippine Navy vessel

History

Philippines
- Name: General Antonio Luna
- Namesake: Antonio Luna (1866–1899), was a Filipino general who fought in the Philippine-American War
- Operator: Philippine Navy
- Builder: Cavite Naval Ship Yard
- Laid down: 2 December 1990
- Launched: 23 June 1992
- Commissioned: 1999
- Decommissioned: 8 April 2016
- Home port: Naval Base Cavite
- Status: Decommissioned

General characteristics
- Class & type: General Emilio Aguinaldo class
- Type: Large Patrol Boat
- Tonnage: 215 tons
- Displacement: 279 tons full load
- Length: 144.4 ft (44.0 m)
- Beam: 20.4 ft (6.2 m)
- Draft: 5.3 ft (1.6 m)
- Installed power: 2,040 bhp (1,520 kW)
- Propulsion: 4 × GM Detroit Diesel 12V92 TA Diesel engines; 4 × propellers
- Speed: 18 knots (33 km/h) sustained, 25 knots (46 km/h) maximum
- Range: 1,100 nmi (2,000 km) at 18 knots (33 km/h)
- Crew: 6 officers, 52 enlisted
- Sensors & processing systems: AN/SPS-64(V)2
- Armament: 2 × 40 mm 60-cal single Bofors Mk.3 AA gun; 2 × 20 mm 70-cal single Oerlikon AA guns; 4 × 12.7 mm HMG

BRP General Antonio Luna was the second ship of the General Emilio Aguinaldo class patrol vessel of the Philippine Navy. This ship, along with her only sistership BRP General Emilio Aguinaldo (PG-140), was one of the last that were made in the Cavite Naval Ship Yard. The original plan called for 6 Aguinaldo class vessels to be built, but this number may not be reached.

She was decommissioned on 8 April 2016.

== Technical details ==
The ship's basic hull design was based on the Japanese-designed Tirad Pass SAR vessel, and the superstructure was adopted from the German-designed Kagitingan class. The class's design was found to be overloaded and underpowered and due to this, there were no more plans to build all the ships originally planned.

The present weapon systems of the ship are composed of manually operated gun platforms, some guns which are from World War II era. They are composed of two Mk.3 Bofors 40 mm 60-cal single-mount guns acting as the ship's primary weapon, together with two 20 mm Oerlikon single-mount anti-aircraft guns and four 12.7 mm general purpose machine guns.

The ship is powered by two GM Detroit Diesel 12V92 TA diesel engines with a combined power of around 2,040 bhp (1,520 kW) driving four propellers. The main engines can propel the 279-ton (full load) ship at a maximum speed of around 25 knots (46 km/h). It has a maximum range of 1,100 nautical miles (2,040 km) at a speed of 18 knots (33 km/h).
