= Hilaria Aguinaldo =

First wife of Emilio Aguinaldo

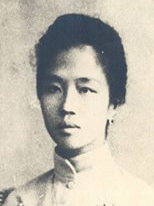

First Lady of the Philippines
- In role March 22, 1897 – April 1, 1901
- President: Emilio Aguinaldo
- Preceded by: Position established
- Succeeded by: Aurora Quezon

Personal details
- Born: Hilaria del Rosario y Reyes; February 17, 1877 Imus, Cavite, Captaincy General of the Philippines, Spanish Empire
- Died: March 6, 1921 (aged 44) Cavite el Viejo, Cavite, Philippine Islands
- Spouse: Emilio Aguinaldo (m. 1896; sep. 1905)
- Children: 5

Hilaria del Rosario de Aguinaldo (born Hilaria del Rosario y Reyes; 17 February 1877 – 6 March 1921) was the first wife of General Emilio Aguinaldo, the first President of the Philippines.

== Life ==
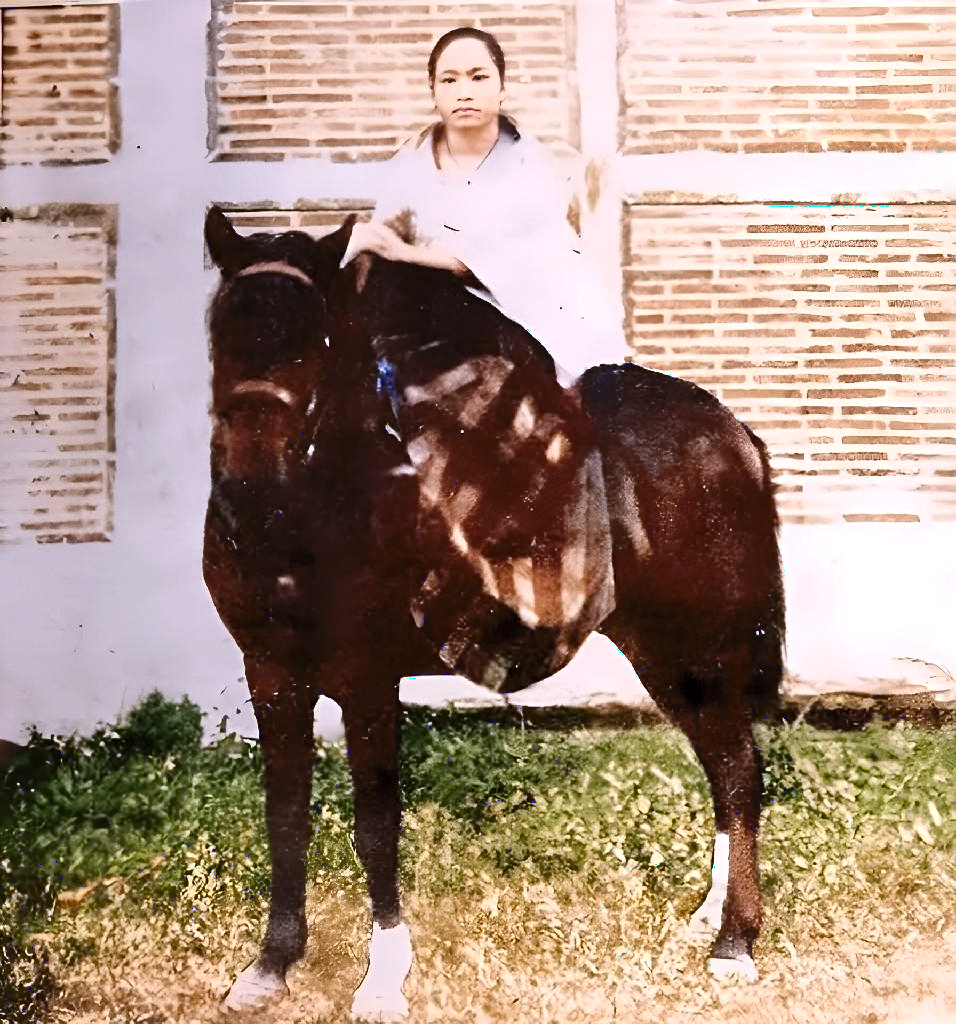
Hilaria Aguinaldo on horseback.

Hilaria del Rosario y Reyes was born on February 17, 1877, in Tinabunan (now Pag-asa) in Imus, Cavite to Guillermo del Rosario y Bautista and Cristina Reyes y Flores. She was baptized four days later by Andrés Galdeano at Imus Church.

Emilio Aguinaldo married her on New Year's Day, 1896–the very same day he joined the Katipunan, the secret society that would initiate the Philippine Revolution that year. They had five children: Carmen Aguinaldo-Melencio, Emilio "Jun" R. Aguinaldo Jr., Maria Aguinaldo-Poblete, Cristina Aguinaldo-Suntay, and Miguel Aguinaldo. Although the title "First Lady" (Spanish: Primera Dama) was not used, and did not refer to the wife of the President of the Philippines (being used only with the onset of the American governors-general in reference to their wives) at the time, she is today considered the first First Lady of the Philippines.

She complemented Emilio's military campaigns by caring for wounded soldiers and their families. In February 17, 1899, as the president's consort, she established the Hijas de la Revolución (Daughters of the Revolution) that later became Asociación Filantrópica de los Damas de la Cruz Roja en Filipinas (Red Cross Association).

The organisation is considered a precursor of the present Philippine Red Cross, and for this she raised funds for medicines and other medical supplies. She was captured by American troops in 1900 and reunited with her husband after his capture by the Americans in 1901.

== Death ==
A copy of Hilaria del Rosario's 1920 Last Will and Testament stated that she and Aguinaldo were separated for 15 years at the time the document was crafted. Based on the document, the separation happened in 1905.

Hilaria del Rosario de Aguinaldo died on March 6, 1921, aged 44, from pulmonary tuberculosis. She was buried the next day.

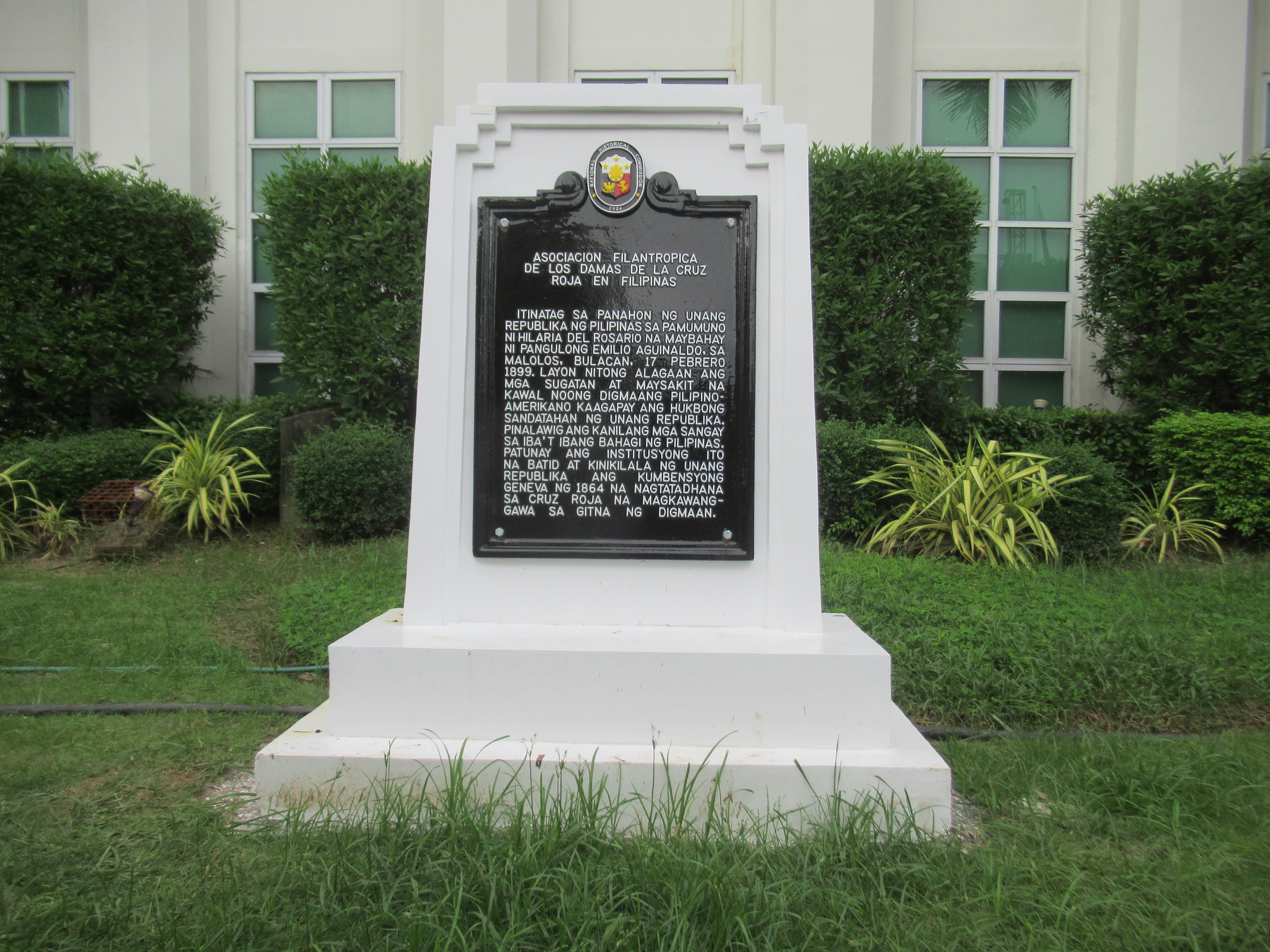
Historical marker

== Legacy and remembrance ==
As a historical commemoration, the "Asociación Filantrópica de los Damas de la Cruz Roja en Filipinas" historical marker was installed on August 17, 2024 by the National Historical Commission of the Philippines at the Bulacan Provincial Capitol coinciding with the province's 446th founding anniversary.

== In popular culture ==
- Portrayed by Cristine Reyes in the 2012 film, El Presidente.
- Portrayed by Che Ramos in the 2018 film, Goyo: Ang Batang Heneral.

Honorary titles
New title	First Lady of the Philippines; 1897–1901	Vacant Presidency abolished due to United States annexation Title next held by Aurora Aragón
