= Council of State (Philippines) =

Advisory body to the President of the Philippines

- Tagalog: Sangguniang Pambansa; Spanish: Consejo de Estado

Agency overview
- Formed: October 16, 1918 (107 years ago)
- Type: Advisory body
- Headquarters: Malacañang Palace, Manila
- Agency executive: Bongbong Marcos, President of the Philippines
- Key document: Executive Order 168, s. 2003

The Council of State of the Philippines (Filipino: Sangguniang Pambansa) is an advisory body composed primarily of senior statesmen who act as advisors to the President of the Philippines, who is both head of state and head of government, as well as Commander-in-Chief of the Armed Forces of the Philippines. Customarily, former presidents are, among other things, made Councillors of State for life, owing to their experience and knowledge in the position.

== History ==
=== Establishment ===
The council was first established during the American colonial period by Governor-General Francis Burton Harrison upon the recommendation of Senate President Manuel L. Quezon and House Speaker Sergio Osmeña. Harrison issued an executive order on October 16, 1918, creating the first Council of State in the Philippines "to harmonise the executive and legislative departments". It was composed of the governor-general as chairman, the House Speaker, the Senate President, and members of the Cabinet.

It was the council's duty to advise the Governor-General on matters such as the creation of policies for administering government offices. The council's mandate included the provision that all executive bureaus except Public Instruction (presently the Department of Education) be headed by Filipinos, and that these agencies assist the Philippine Legislature in creating laws. Filipinos now had equal say in all aspects of policymaking and budget preparation. At the time Governor-General Harrison declared, "It will now never be so... for an executive to ride ruthlessly over the people he is sent here to govern, without due regard for their sentiments and due consideration of their wishes".

The Council held weekly meetings, and on other occasions at the pleasure of the Governor-General. It was composed of the Governor-General, department secretaries, the Speaker of the Lower House, and the Senate President. During Harrison's term, the executive and legislative branches of government worked harmoniously with each other.

=== Commonwealth Period until the Third Republic ===
The council was restored in 1938 during the Commonwealth of the Philippines under President Manuel L. Quezon.

During World War II, it also performed administrative functions under the Japanese-sponsored government of President José P. Laurel.

Shortly after the independence of the Philippines in 1946, President Manuel Roxas restored the original Council, and it became a feature of succeeding administrations during the Third Republic.

In 1970, President Ferdinand Marcos abolished the Council of State and organized the Council of Leaders through Executive Order No. 222 with the following members: the Vice President, the Senate President, the House Speaker, the President of the Governors and City Mayors League of the Philippines, former Presidents of the Philippines, the Presidents of the political parties which had candidates on a nation-wide scale in the last elections, the Chairman of the Committees of both Houses of Congress whose functions are relevant to the subject matter to be discussed in the council, and members of the Cabinet the functions of whose departments are relevant to the subject matter to be discussed in the council. After a year, this was amended by Executive Order 349, s. 1971, which expanded the membership to include the Senate President Pro Tempore, the Speaker Pro Tempore of the House of Representatives, the Majority Floor Leaders of both Houses of Congress, the Minority Floor Leaders of both Houses of Congress, the chairman and the ranking minority member of the Committee of both Houses of Congress whose functions are relevant to the subject matter to be discussed in the council and such other government officials as the President may designate.

=== Fourth Republic ===
On February 22, 1986, Marcos revived the Council of State through Executive Order No. 1093 and, with the President as chairman, designated the following as members: the Vice-President as Vice Chairman, and the Chief Justice of the Supreme Court, the Prime Minister, the Deputy Prime Minister, the Minister of Finance, the Minister of Foreign Affairs, the Minister of National Defense, the Speaker, the Speaker Pro-Tempore, the Majority Floor Leader and Minority Floor Leader of the Batasang Pambansa, the former Presidents and Vice-Presidents of the Republic of the Philippines, and a representative from the dominant opposition party as nominated by that party. However, the People Power Revolution removed him from power three days later.

=== Fifth Republic ===
The council was reorganized in 1987 composed of the following members: the President as chairman, the Vice President, the President of the Senate, the Speaker of the House of Representatives, the Executive Secretary, the Secretary of National Defense, the Chief of Staff of the Armed Forces of the Philippines, members of Congress, the Cabinet and the private sector who, in the opinion of the President, are knowledgeable about the issues and problems to be discussed by the council. However, it lapsed into disuse without being formally abolished.

In 2003, President Gloria Macapagal Arroyo reconstituted the council through Executive Order No. 168. The membership of the council was expanded to include former Presidents, the Majority and Minority Floor Leaders of the Senate, the Majority and Minority Floor Leaders of the House of Representatives, the President of the League of Provinces, the President of the League of Cities, the President of the League of Municipalities. It also includes other members of the Cabinet, representatives from the private sector, and other persons that the president may appoint from time to time.

The council was last convened on January 26, 2006, in an attempt of Arroyo to seek dialogue and cooperation with her political enemies following the Hello Garci scandal of 2005. The meeting was not attended by members of the opposition and those who called for Arroyo's resignation such as former President Aquino, Senate President Franklin Drilon, Senate Minority Floor Leader Aquilino Pimentel Jr., and House Minority Floor Leader Francis Escudero.

== Composition ==
With Executive Order No. 168, s. 2003 as basis, the Council of State has the following members as of :

Class	Office	Current members
Ex officio: Executive	President	Bongbong Marcos
Ex officio: Executive	Vice President	Sara Duterte
Ex officio: Executive	Executive Secretary	Ralph Recto
Ex officio: Executive	Cabinet	Members of the Cabinet
Ex officio: Senate	President	Sherwin Gatchalian
Ex officio: Senate	President pro tempore	Vicente Sotto III
Ex officio: Senate	Majority Floor Leader	Juan Miguel Zubiri
Ex officio: Senate	Minority Floor Leader	Alan Peter Cayetano
Ex officio: House of Representatives	Speaker	Bojie Dy
Ex officio: House of Representatives	Deputy Speaker	List of Deputy Speakers
Ex officio: House of Representatives	Majority Floor Leader	Sandro Marcos
Ex officio: House of Representatives	Minority Floor Leader	Marcelino Libanan
Ex officio: League of Local Government Units	President, League of Provinces	Reynaldo Tamayo Jr.
Ex officio: League of Local Government Units	President, League of Cities	Francis Zamora
Ex officio: League of Local Government Units	President, League of Municipalities	Inno Dy
Former Officeholders	President	Joseph Estrada; Gloria Macapagal Arroyo; Rodrigo Duterte

The Cabinet Secretariat shall serve as the Secretariat of the Council of State.

== See also ==
- Council of State, for the general concept
- President of the Philippines
- National Security Council
