= Region III's at-large parliamentary district =

Former Philippine parliamentary district

- Former constituency for the Interim Batasang Pambansa

Former constituency
- Created: 1978
- Abolished: 1984
- Seats: 16

Region III's at-large parliamentary district (also known as Central Luzon's at-large parliamentary district) was a constituency for the Interim Batasang Pambansa, the legislature of the Philippines from 1978 to 1984. It encompassed the provinces of Bataan, Bulacan, Nueva Ecija, Pampanga, Tarlac, and Zambales, together with the cities of Angeles, Cabanatuan, Olongapo, Palayan and San Jose.

The district had 16 seats in the assembly, all of which were held by members of the ruling party Kilusang Bagong Lipunan.

== List of assemblymen representing the district ==
=== Batasang Pambansa (1978–1986) ===
Portrait	Member (Lifespan) (Province)	Term of office	Party	Legislature	Electoral history	Constituencies
District established February 7, 1978.
	Vicente Abad Santos (1916–1993) (Tarlac)	June 12, 1978 – January 17, 1979	KBL	Interim Batasang Pambansa	Elected in 1978. Resigned on appointment as Associate Justice of the Supreme Court.	1978–1984; Provinces: Bataan, Bulacan, Nueva Ecija, Pampanga, Tarlac, Zambales Cities: Angeles, Cabanatuan, Olongapo, Palayan, San Jose
	Amado Alinea (Zambales)	June 12, 1978 – June 30, 1984	KBL	Interim Batasang Pambansa	Elected in 1978.	1978–1984; Provinces: Bataan, Bulacan, Nueva Ecija, Pampanga, Tarlac, Zambales Cities: Angeles, Cabanatuan, Olongapo, Palayan, San Jose
	Felicita Bernardino (1918–1983) (Bulacan)	June 12, 1978 – May 23, 1983 (Note: Died in office.)	KBL	Interim Batasang Pambansa	Elected in 1978. Died.	1978–1984; Provinces: Bataan, Bulacan, Nueva Ecija, Pampanga, Tarlac, Zambales Cities: Angeles, Cabanatuan, Olongapo, Palayan, San Jose
	Angel Concepcion (Cabanatuan City)	June 12, 1978 – June 30, 1984	KBL	Interim Batasang Pambansa	Elected in 1978.	1978–1984; Provinces: Bataan, Bulacan, Nueva Ecija, Pampanga, Tarlac, Zambales Cities: Angeles, Cabanatuan, Olongapo, Palayan, San Jose
	Leopoldo Diaz (1912–2000) (Nueva Ecija)	June 12, 1978 – June 30, 1984	KBL	Interim Batasang Pambansa	Elected in 1978.	1978–1984; Provinces: Bataan, Bulacan, Nueva Ecija, Pampanga, Tarlac, Zambales Cities: Angeles, Cabanatuan, Olongapo, Palayan, San Jose
	Juan Liwag (1906–1983) (Nueva Ecija)	June 12, 1978 – November 30, 1983	KBL	Interim Batasang Pambansa	Elected in 1978. Died.	1978–1984; Provinces: Bataan, Bulacan, Nueva Ecija, Pampanga, Tarlac, Zambales Cities: Angeles, Cabanatuan, Olongapo, Palayan, San Jose
	Vicente Magsaysay (1940–2020) (Zambales)	June 12, 1978 – June 30, 1984	KBL	Interim Batasang Pambansa	Elected in 1978.	1978–1984; Provinces: Bataan, Bulacan, Nueva Ecija, Pampanga, Tarlac, Zambales Cities: Angeles, Cabanatuan, Olongapo, Palayan, San Jose
	Baldomero Mangiliman (Tarlac)	June 12, 1978 – June 30, 1984	KBL	Interim Batasang Pambansa	Elected in 1978.	1978–1984; Provinces: Bataan, Bulacan, Nueva Ecija, Pampanga, Tarlac, Zambales Cities: Angeles, Cabanatuan, Olongapo, Palayan, San Jose
	Estelito Mendoza (1930–2025) (Pampanga)	June 12, 1978 – June 30, 1984	KBL	Interim Batasang Pambansa	Elected in 1978.	1978–1984; Provinces: Bataan, Bulacan, Nueva Ecija, Pampanga, Tarlac, Zambales Cities: Angeles, Cabanatuan, Olongapo, Palayan, San Jose
	Teodulo Natividad (1923–1997) (Bulacan)	June 12, 1978 – June 30, 1984	KBL	Interim Batasang Pambansa	Elected in 1978.	1978–1984; Provinces: Bataan, Bulacan, Nueva Ecija, Pampanga, Tarlac, Zambales Cities: Angeles, Cabanatuan, Olongapo, Palayan, San Jose
	Narciso Nario (Nueva Ecija)	June 12, 1978 – June 30, 1984	KBL	Interim Batasang Pambansa	Elected in 1978.	1978–1984; Provinces: Bataan, Bulacan, Nueva Ecija, Pampanga, Tarlac, Zambales Cities: Angeles, Cabanatuan, Olongapo, Palayan, San Jose
	Blas Ople (1927–2003) (Bulacan)	June 12, 1978 – June 30, 1984	KBL	Interim Batasang Pambansa	Elected in 1978.	1978–1984; Provinces: Bataan, Bulacan, Nueva Ecija, Pampanga, Tarlac, Zambales Cities: Angeles, Cabanatuan, Olongapo, Palayan, San Jose
	Cicero Punsalan (1937–2017) (Pampanga)	June 12, 1978 – June 30, 1984	KBL	Interim Batasang Pambansa	Elected in 1978.	1978–1984; Provinces: Bataan, Bulacan, Nueva Ecija, Pampanga, Tarlac, Zambales Cities: Angeles, Cabanatuan, Olongapo, Palayan, San Jose
	Antonino Roman (1939–2014) (Bataan)	June 12, 1978 – June 30, 1984	KBL	Interim Batasang Pambansa	Elected in 1978.	1978–1984; Provinces: Bataan, Bulacan, Nueva Ecija, Pampanga, Tarlac, Zambales Cities: Angeles, Cabanatuan, Olongapo, Palayan, San Jose
	Mercedes Teodoro (Tarlac)	June 12, 1978 – June 30, 1984	KBL	Interim Batasang Pambansa	Elected in 1978.	1978–1984; Provinces: Bataan, Bulacan, Nueva Ecija, Pampanga, Tarlac, Zambales Cities: Angeles, Cabanatuan, Olongapo, Palayan, San Jose
	Eller Torres (Angeles City)	June 12, 1978 – June 30, 1984	KBL	Interim Batasang Pambansa	Elected in 1978.	1978–1984; Provinces: Bataan, Bulacan, Nueva Ecija, Pampanga, Tarlac, Zambales Cities: Angeles, Cabanatuan, Olongapo, Palayan, San Jose
District dissolved into Bataan's at-large, Bulacan's at-large, Olongapo's at-large, Nueva Ecija's at-large, Pampanga's at-large, Tarlac's at-large, and Zambales's at-large districts.

== Election results ==
=== 1978 ===
Candidate	Party	Votes	%
Blas Ople	KBL	1,369,038	6.54
Felicitas Bernardino	KBL	1,295,297	6.19
Teodulo Natividad	KBL	1,288,563	6.16
Estelito Mendoza	KBL	1,279,698	6.12
Vicente Magsaysay	KBL	1,266,224	6.05
Juan Liwag	KBL	1,260,099	6.02
Vicente Abad Santos	BLKNNL	1,249,185	5.97
Cicero Jose Punzalan	KBL	1,238,482	5.92
Leopoldo Diaz	KBL	1,236,992	5.91
Mercedes Teodoro	KBL	1,228,590	5.87
Angel Concepcion	KBL	1,227,814	5.87
Antonino Roman Jr.	KBL	1,199,173	5.73
Eller Torres	KBL	1,196,287	5.72
Narciso Nario	KBL	1,193,678	5.71
Amadeo Alinea	KBL	1,182,779	5.65
Baldomero Mangiliman	KBL	1,158,878	5.54
Rebeck Espiritu	LABAN	141,210	0.67
Fidel Reyes	KBL	88,215	0.42
Jesus Santos	Independent	86,180	0.41
Gualberto dela Llana	Independent	85,247	0.41
Victor Cadiz	Independent	77,802	0.37
Hoover Canlas	Independent	72,809	0.35
Bernabe Buscayno	Independent	70,835	0.34
Purita Trabajo	Independent	65,701	0.31
Benjamin de Leon	Independent	64,430	0.31
John Manalili	Independent	48,599	0.23
Daniel David	Citizens Union for Progress	44,893	0.21
Rolando Samaniego	Independent	40,437	0.19
Benigno Navarro	Philippine Labor Party	31,599	0.15
George Haygood	Independent	30,063	0.14
Andrea Ocampo	Emancipated Scientists Party	26,487	0.13
Benigno Marquez	Emancipated Scientists Party	23,118	0.11
Fausta Santos	Emancipated Scientists Party	20,030	0.10
Teodorico Magcawas	Partido ng Bagong Pilipino	18,319	0.09
Troadio Carbungco	Emancipated Scientists Party	14,760	0.07
Total		20,921,511	100.00
Total votes		1,745,877	–
Registered voters/turnout		2,063,864	84.59
