= Teodulo Natividad =

Filipino lawyer, criminologist and politician

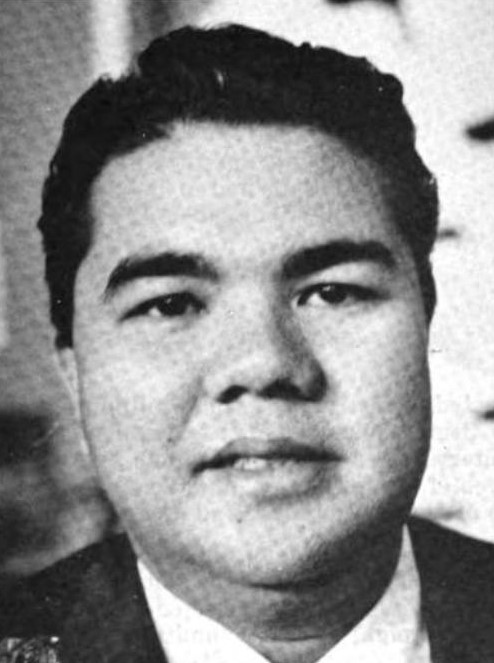
- Natividad during the 6th Congress of the Philippines, c. 1966

Member of the House of Representatives of the Philippines from Bulacan's 1st congressional district
- In office June 30, 1992 – January 9, 1997

Member of the Regular Batasang Pambansa from Bulacan
- In office 1984–1986

Member of the Interim Batasang Pambansa from Region III
- In office 1978–1984

Member of the House of Representatives of the Philippines from Bulacan's 1st congressional district
- In office December 30, 1961 – September 23, 1972

Personal details
- Born: February 17
- Died: January 9, 1997
- Occupation: Lawyer, criminologist, politician, public administrator

Teodulo Capili Natividad (born February 17; died January 9, 1997) was a Filipino lawyer, criminologist, politician and public administrator. He represented the first district of Bulacan in the House of Representatives of the Philippines from 1961 until the abolition of Congress following the declaration of martial law in 1972, and again from 1992 until his death in 1997. He also represented Central Luzon in the Interim Batasang Pambansa from 1978 to 1984 and Bulacan in the Regular Batasang Pambansa from 1984 to 1986.

Natividad was involved in the development of Philippine policing and corrections policy. He authored the House bill that became the Police Act of 1966, which created the Police Commission, the predecessor of the modern National Police Commission (NAPOLCOM). He later helped develop the country's probation system and became the first administrator of the Probation Administration, now the Parole and Probation Administration.

In 1986, President Corazon Aquino appointed Natividad to the Constitutional Commission that drafted the 1987 Constitution. The commission's records credited him particularly with proposals concerning a civilian national police force and the treatment of prisoners.

== Legal and professional career ==
Natividad was a lawyer and criminologist. A study of the members of the 1986 Constitutional Commission published in the Philippine Journal of Public Administration included him among the commission's members, while contemporary biographical material on the framers identified his professional background as law and criminology.

The Supreme Court's Roll of Attorneys records a Teodulo C. Natividad of Malolos, Bulacan, as having been admitted to the Philippine Bar on March 11, 1957.

Natividad was also a veteran of World War II. During the proceedings of the 1986 Constitutional Commission, fellow commissioner Blas Ople identified Natividad as having served with the Republic Regiment of the Bulacan Military Area during the war.

== Political career ==
=== House of Representatives, 1961–1972 ===
Natividad was first elected representative of Bulacan's first district in 1961. He served during the 5th Congress from 1961 to 1965, the 6th Congress from 1965 to 1969, and the 7th Congress from 1969 until 1972.

Among his significant legislative work was House Bill No. 6951, which became Republic Act No. 4864, or the Police Act of 1966. The law created the Police Commission under the Office of the President and sought to professionalize the country's local police services.

The law directed the commission to establish training programs, prescribe standards for local police agencies and examine the feasibility of creating a national police organization that would be non-military and civilian in character.

Natividad also sponsored legislation changing the name of the municipality of Bigaa, Bulacan, to Balagtas, in honour of poet Francisco Balagtas.

He was involved in legislation concerning what became Bulacan State University. Republic Act No. 4470, enacted in 1965, converted the Bulacan School of Arts and Trades into the Bulacan College of Arts and Trades. Natividad later became the principal author of legislation converting the college into a state university.

His House service ended following the declaration of martial law in September 1972 and the subsequent abolition of Congress.

== Police and probation administration ==
Natividad continued to work on criminal justice and policing policy after his earlier congressional career. He served as a commissioner of the National Police Commission and represented the Philippines at international meetings on crime prevention. A United Nations record identifies him as head of the Philippine delegation and a commissioner of the National Police Commission at the Fifth United Nations Congress on the Prevention of Crime and the Treatment of Offenders.

In 1975, Natividad introduced a proposal to establish a probation system in the Philippines. The proposal underwent a series of technical hearings and was presented at a seminar sponsored by NAPOLCOM at the UP Law Center in April 1976 and at the First National Conference on Crime Control later that year.

President Ferdinand Marcos subsequently issued Presidential Decree No. 968, the Probation Law of 1976, on July 24, 1976, establishing the Probation Administration. Natividad was appointed its first administrator. The Parole and Probation Administration has consequently described him as the "Father of Philippine Probation".

== Batasang Pambansa ==
Natividad returned to national legislative office as a member of the Interim Batasang Pambansa, representing Region III from 1978 to 1984.

He was subsequently elected as one of the representatives of Bulacan in the Regular Batasang Pambansa, serving from 1984 until its dissolution in 1986.

== 1986 Constitutional Commission ==
Following the People Power Revolution, President Corazon Aquino appointed Natividad as one of the 48 members of the Constitutional Commission tasked with drafting a new constitution. He took his oath with the other members when the commission convened on June 2, 1986.

In its final journal, the commission identified Natividad's principal contributions as proposals concerning the creation of a Philippine National Police that would be civilian in character and administered through the National Police Commission, as well as a constitutional prohibition against subhuman conditions in prisons and other detention facilities.

During deliberations concerning the national police, Natividad argued for separating police functions from the military. The Supreme Court of the Philippines later cited his statements in Carpio v. Executive Secretary when discussing the constitutional requirement that the national police force be civilian in character.

Natividad also spoke against restoring capital punishment. Amnesty International later cited his remarks before the commission, in which he referred to the 1976 execution of drug trafficker Lim Seng and questioned whether the execution had deterred drug-related crime.

== Return to Congress ==
Natividad returned to the House of Representatives after winning election in 1992 as representative of Bulacan's first district. He served in the 9th Congress and was re-elected to the 10th Congress in 1995.

His legislative proposals during this period continued to focus on criminal justice, policing, education and public institutions. The Senate Legislative Reference Bureau records him as author of measures concerning the Philippine National Police, criminology, drug courts, hospitals and educational institutions.

One of his first measures in the 9th Congress was House Bill No. 564, filed on May 8, 1992, seeking to convert the Bulacan College of Arts and Trades into Bulacan State University. Bulacan State University identifies Natividad as the bill's principal author, with representatives Pedro Pancho, Ricardo Silverio and Angelito Sarmiento as co-authors. The conversion was enacted as Republic Act No. 7665 in December 1993.

Natividad also continued his involvement with NAPOLCOM. A Supreme Court decision concerning the commission identifies him as its vice-chairman and executive officer during the early 1990s.

In 1995, President Fidel V. Ramos appointed Natividad co-chairman of the government committee responsible for preparations commemorating the centennial of the death of Bulacan propagandist Marcelo H. del Pilar.

== Death and legacy ==
Natividad died on January 9, 1997, while serving as representative of Bulacan's first district. His seat remained vacant for the remainder of the 10th Congress.

His work has been commemorated in Malolos. In 2018, the national government declared February 17 a special non-working day in the city to allow residents to commemorate the birth anniversary of Teodulo Capili Natividad.

The central office of the Parole and Probation Administration has a facility named Teodulo Natividad Hall, reflecting his association with the establishment of the Philippine probation system.

== See also ==
- Philippine Constitutional Commission of 1986
- National Police Commission (Philippines)
- Parole and Probation Administration
- Bulacan State University
- Legislative districts of Bulacan
