= Casa Hacienda de Naic =

Historic building in Cavite, Philippines

Coordinates: 14.3205°N 120.7634°E

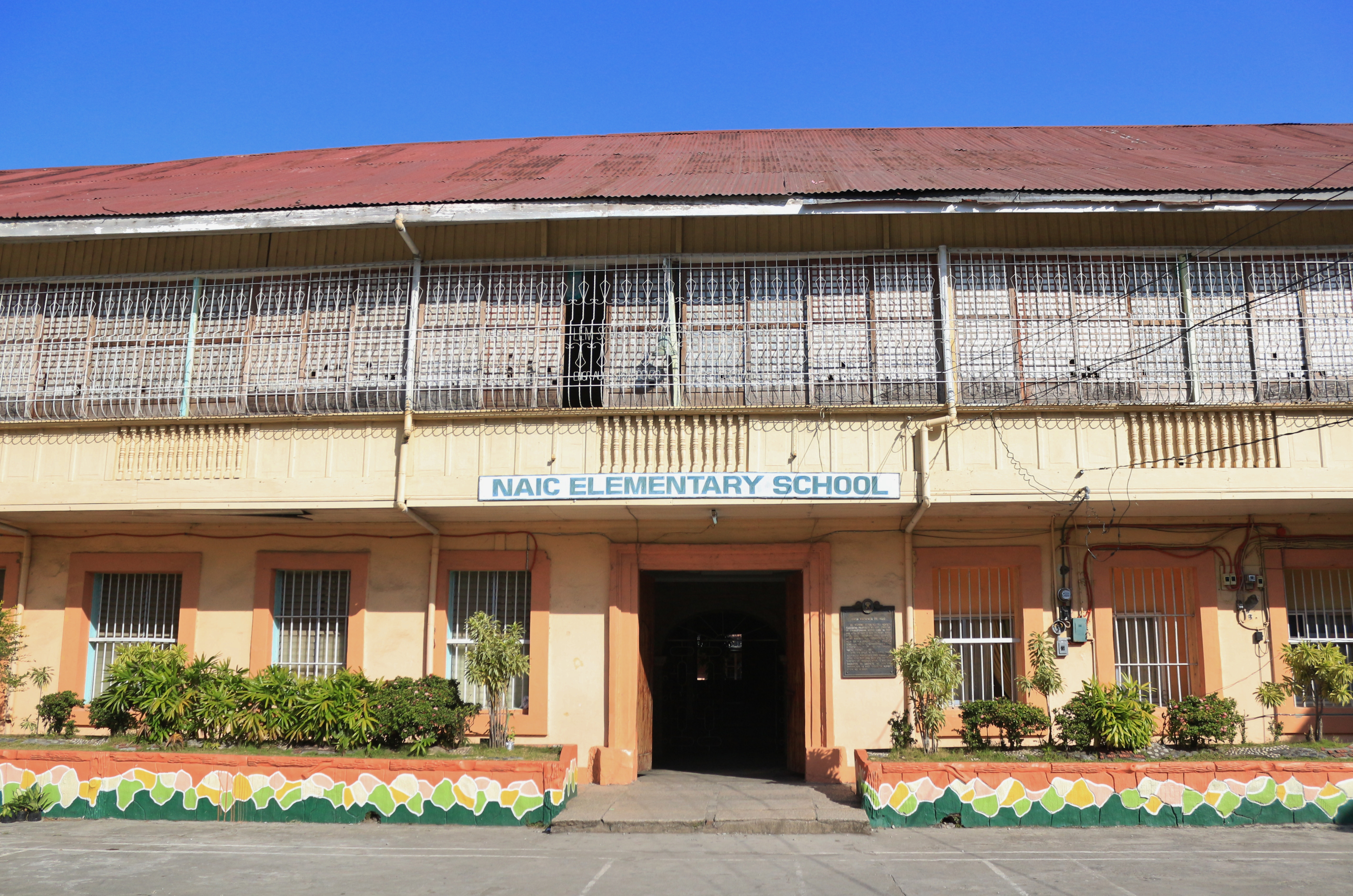
- Interactive map of the Casa Hacienda de Naic area

General information
- Location: Naic, Cavite
- Construction started: 1830

Casa Hacienda de Naic is a 19th-century structure classified as a casa hacienda (hacienda house) located in the town of Naic in Cavite province, Philippines. It is the only existing casa hacienda administered by friars in the Philippines that remains to be used at present.

== History ==
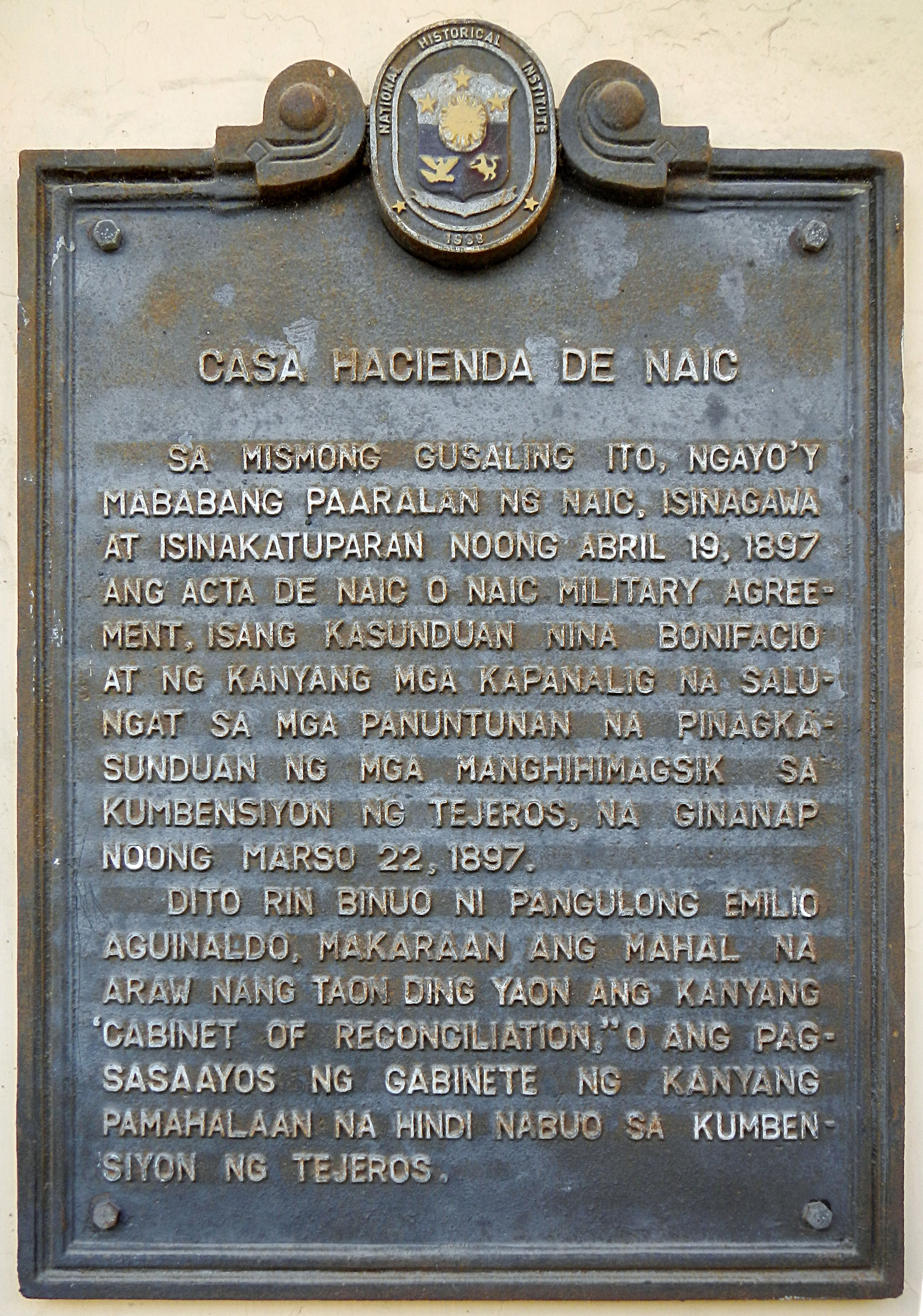
National historical marker installed in 1998

The hacienda was originally constructed around 1830 by the Dominican priests after purchasing a large tract of real estate property known as the Hacienda de San Isidro Labrador to serve as housing for the overseers and workers of the said hacienda.

During the Philippine Revolution, Casa Hacienda fell into the hands of Filipino revolutionaries. It was here that the Naic Assembly was held on April 17, 1897, presided over by Emilio Aguinaldo following on his election as President in the Tejeros Convention on March 27. The Assembly elected a number of cabinet officials, including Pascual Alvarez as the Secretary of the Interior (after its first elected secretary, Andres Bonifacio, did not assume the post in protest of the Tejeros Convention results), Baldomero Aguinaldo as Secretary of Finance, Jacinto Lumbreras as Secretary of State;, Severino de las Alas as Secretary of Justice, and Mariano Alvarez as Secretary of Development.

The hacienda later served as base of operations for Bonifacio and his men who, on April 19, 1897, proclaimed the Naic Military Agreement. That agreement created a rival government headed by Bonifacio, effectively rejecting the Aguinaldo-led government. This led to the eventual arrest of Bonifacio, who was held together with his brother Procopio in a cell located in Casa Hacienda before he was taken to Maragondon where he would be tried and later executed.

Casa Hacienda eventually became part of the Naic Elementary School.

== Gallery ==
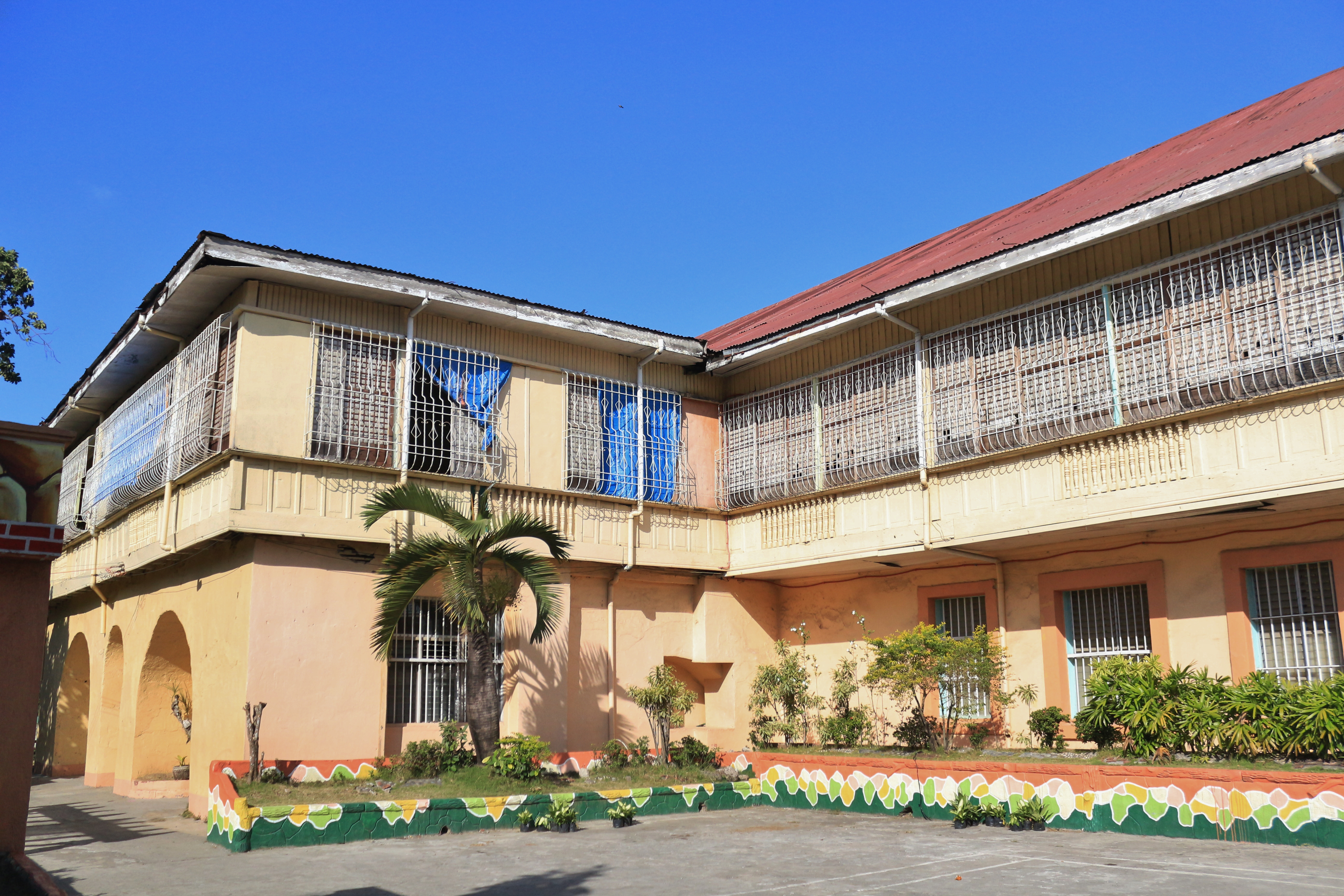

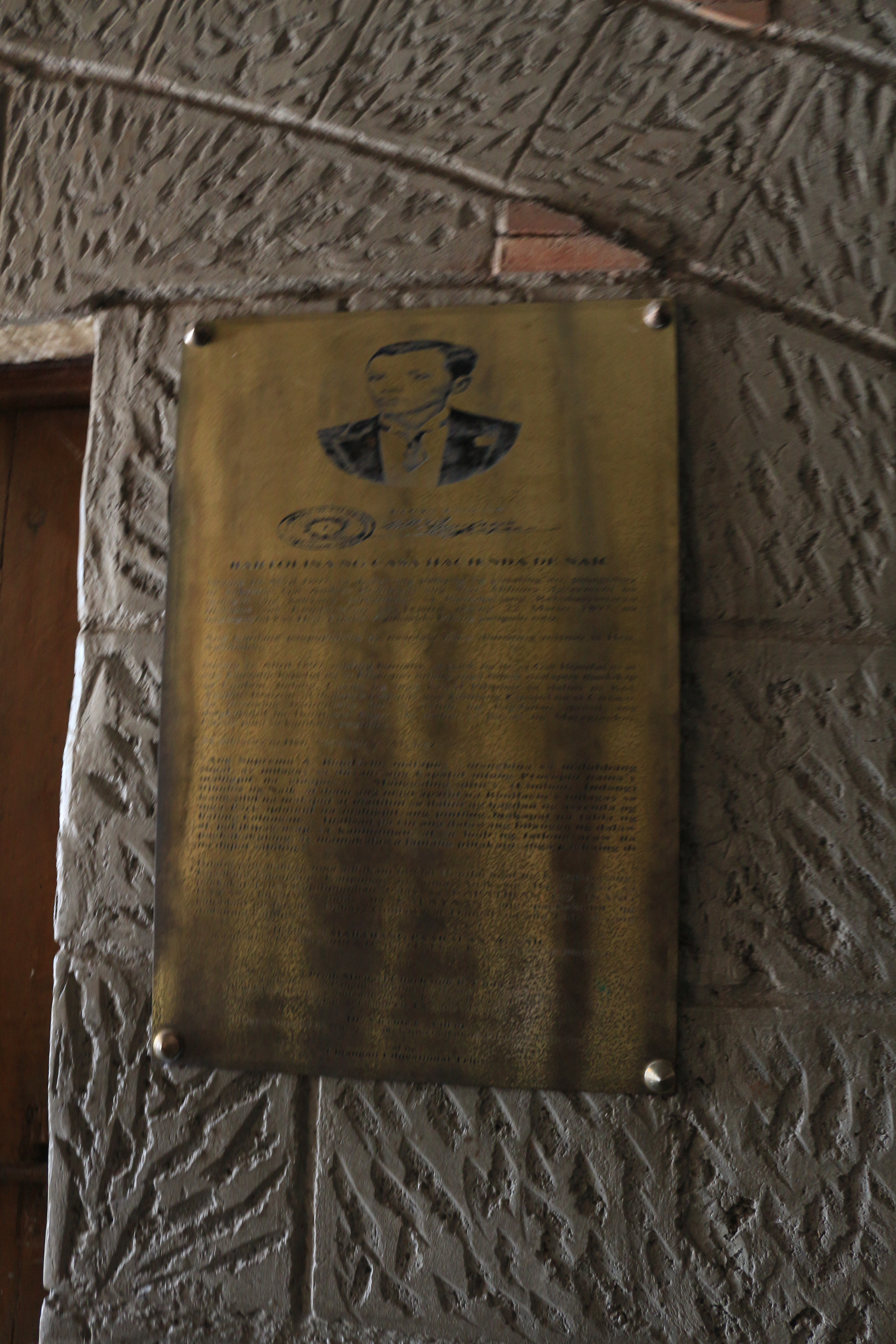
Bonifacio historical marker

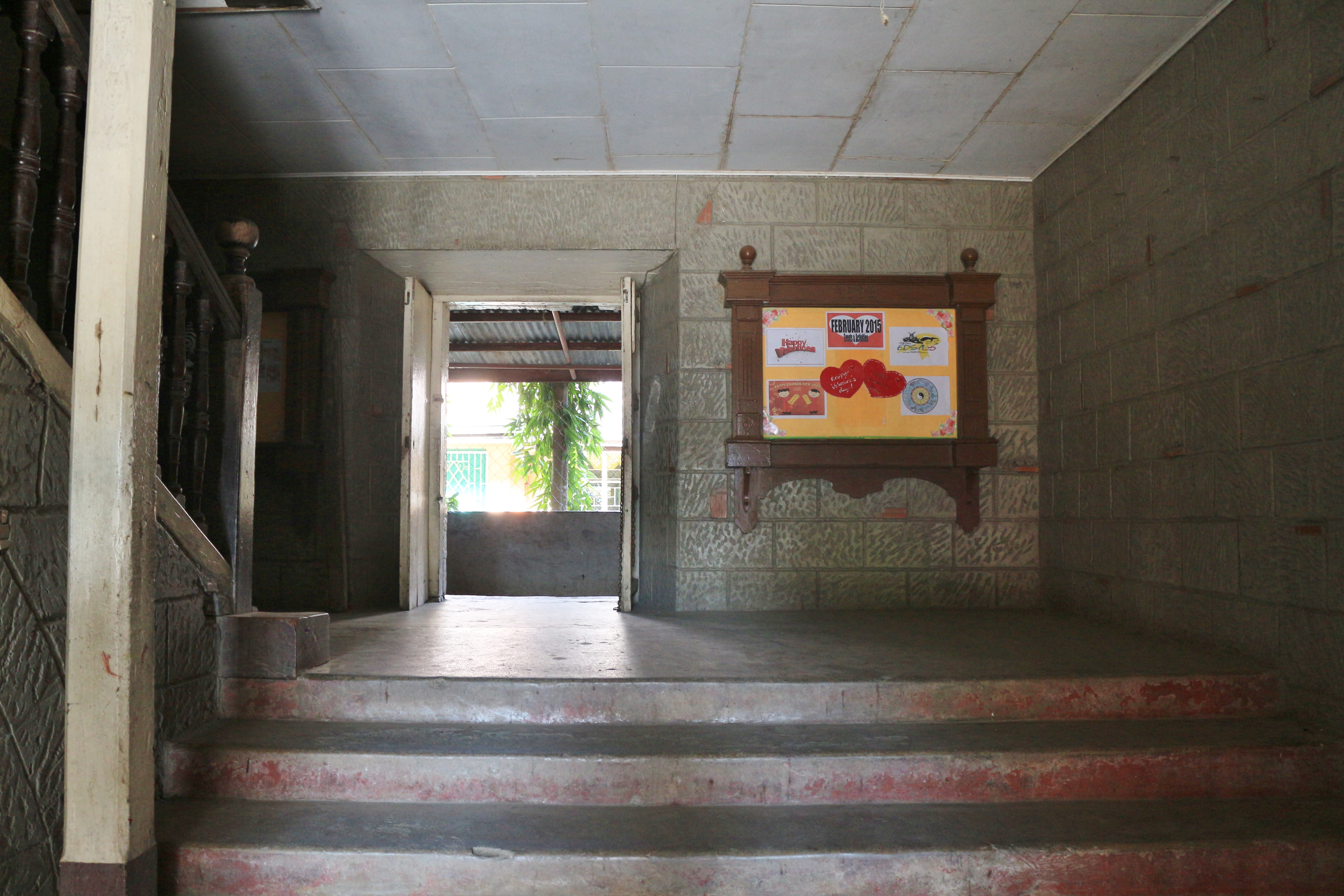

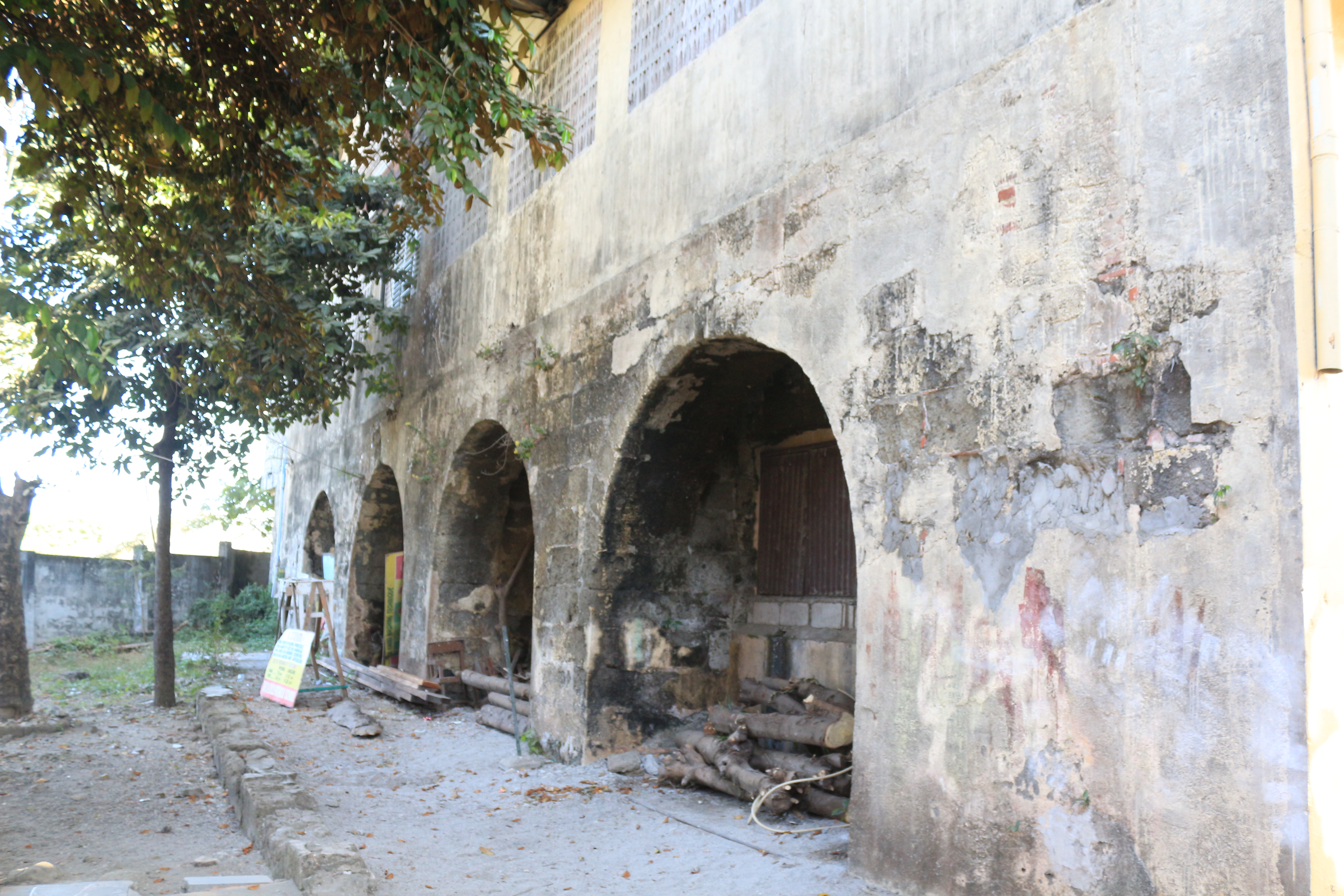

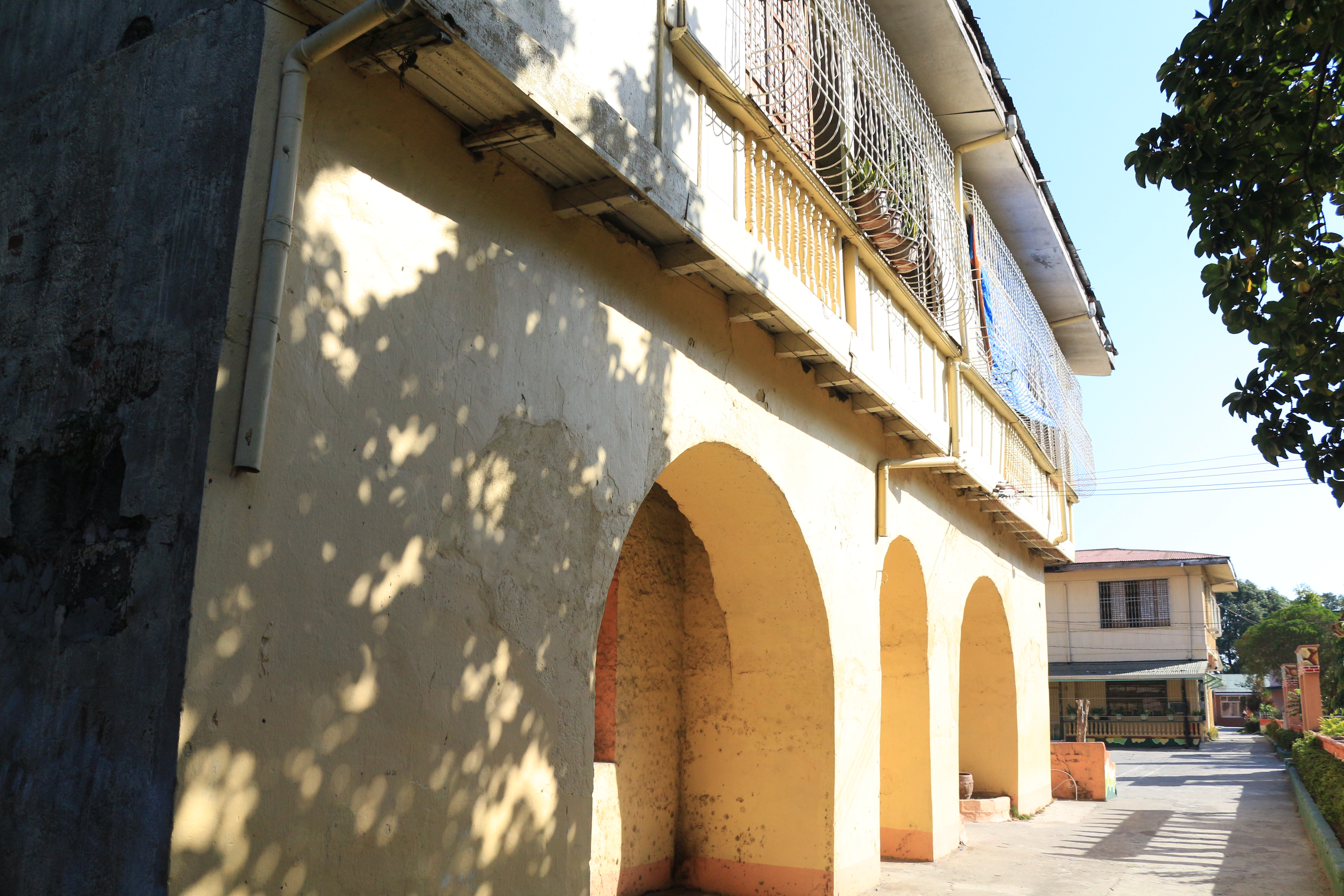
