= Department of Justice (Philippines) =

Executive department of the Philippine government

- Kagawaran ng Katarungan

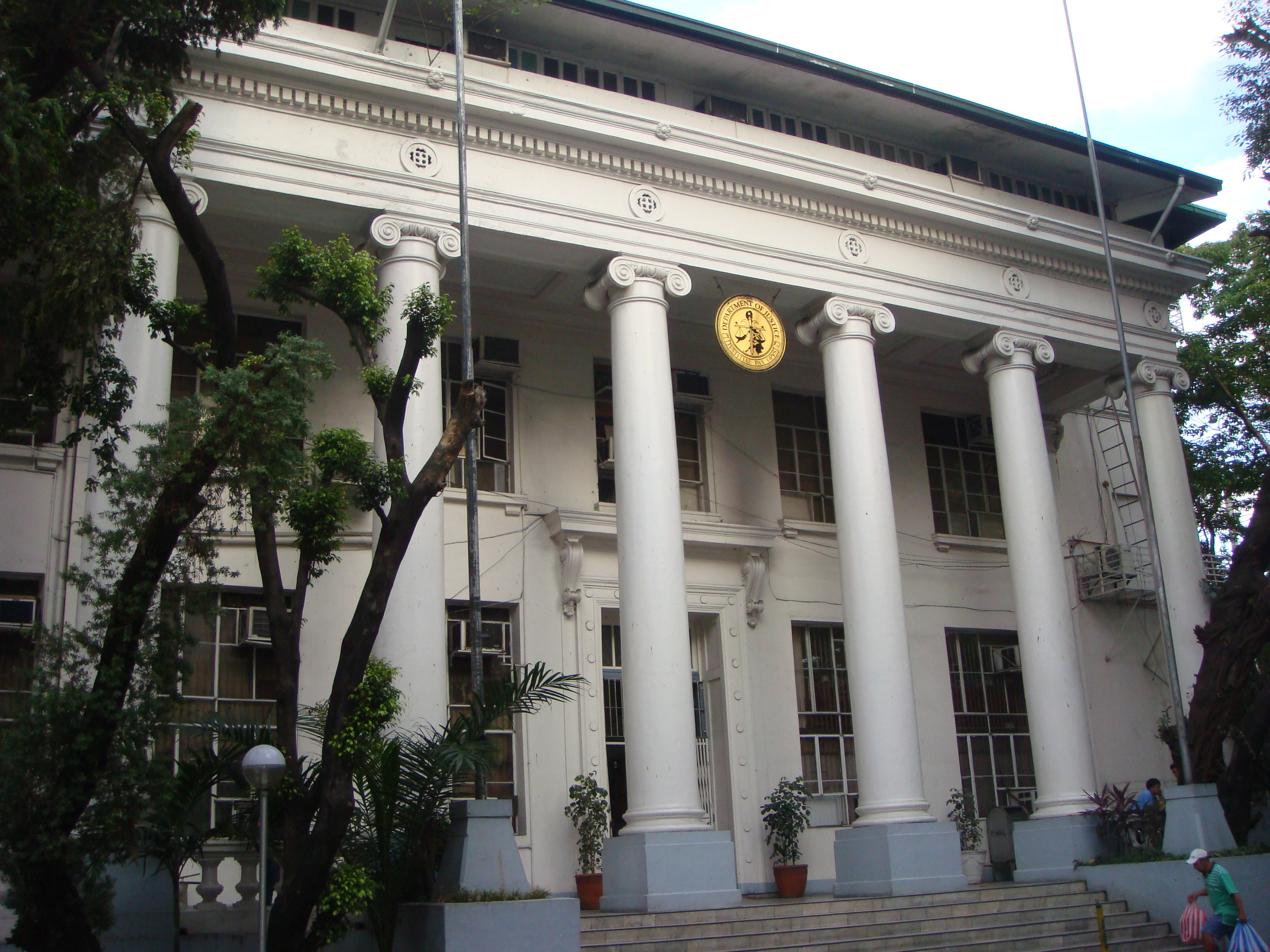

Department overview
- Formed: April 17, 1897; 129 years ago
- Jurisdiction: Government of the Philippines
- Headquarters: DOJ Building, Padre Faura Street, Ermita, Manila; 14°34′45.70″N 120°59′1.93″E
- Motto: Justitiae Pax Opus (The work of Justice is Peace)
- Employees: 5,587 (2024)
- Annual budget: ₱28.6 billion (2023)
- Department executives: Usec. Fredderick A. Vida, Acting Secretary; Atty. Raphael Nicollo “Polo” L. Martinez, Spokesperson
- Child agencies: Bureau of Corrections; Bureau of Immigration; Land Registration Authority; National Bureau of Investigation; Office for Alternative Dispute Resolution; Office of the Government Corporate Counsel; Office of the Solicitor General; Parole and Probation Administration; Presidential Commission on Good Government; Public Attorney's Office
- Website: www.doj.gov.ph

The Department of Justice (Filipino: Kagawaran ng Katarungan, abbreviated as DOJ) is under the executive department of the Philippine government responsible for upholding the rule of law in the Philippines. It is the government's principal law agency, serving as its legal counsel and prosecution arm. It has its headquarters at the DOJ Building in Padre Faura Street, Ermita, Manila.

The department is led by the Secretary of Justice, nominated by the president of the Philippines and confirmed by the Commission on Appointments. The secretary is a member of the Cabinet. The agency is currently held by its Acting Secretary Usec. Fredderick A. Vida.

== History ==
The DOJ traces its beginnings at the Revolutionary Assembly in Naic, Cavite on April 17, 1897. The Department of Grace and Justice was tasked with the establishment of a regime of law in the Republic, with Severino de las Alas at the helm. The department, however, was not included in President Emilio Aguinaldo's Biak-na-Bato Cabinet, which was established in November 1897.

Shortly after the proclamation of independence on June 12, 1898, President Aguinaldo resurrected the department as the Department of Justice via a September 26, 1898 decree. The department, however, disappeared again from Aguinaldo's Cabinet upon the proclamation of the First Republic in 1899.

After the American occupation a year later, the military government established the Office of the Attorney of the Supreme Court. On June 11, 1901, it was renamed the Office of the Attorney General and on September 1 of the same year, the office became the Department of Finance and Justice.

In 1916, the department became a separate entity (once again the Department of Justice) by virtue of the Jones Law, and was given administrative supervision over all courts of first instance and other inferior courts.

Under the Japanese occupation, the department became the Commission of Justice, and later the Ministry of Justice upon the proclamation of the Second Philippine Republic in 1943. After the country's liberation from the Japanese forces near the end of World War II, the restored Commonwealth government re-activated the Department.

Soon, the Supreme Court under the then 1973 Constitution took over the administrative supervision of all lower courts from the DOJ. The succeeding 1987 Constitution upheld it.

It became the Ministry of Justice once more in 1973 during Martial Law, continuing in that form until 1987, when the return to a presidential form of government as mandated by the 1987 Constitution transformed all ministries back to departments. Today, the DOJ continues to pursue its primary mission "To Uphold the Rule of Law" with its "Justice for All" motto. The Office of the Secretary (OSEC) is composed of the National Prosecution Service, the Legal Staff, the Administrative, Financial, Technical and Planning and Management Services and the Board of Pardons and Parole. The constituent and attached agencies include the National Bureau of Investigation (NBI), Bureau of Immigration (BI), Public Attorney’s Office (Philippines) (PAO), Office of the Solicitor General (OSG), Office of the Government Corporate Counsel (OGCC), Bureau of Corrections (BuCOR), Parole and Probation Administration (PPA), Presidential Commission on Good Government (PCGG) and the Land Registration Authority (LRA).

== List of secretaries of justice ==
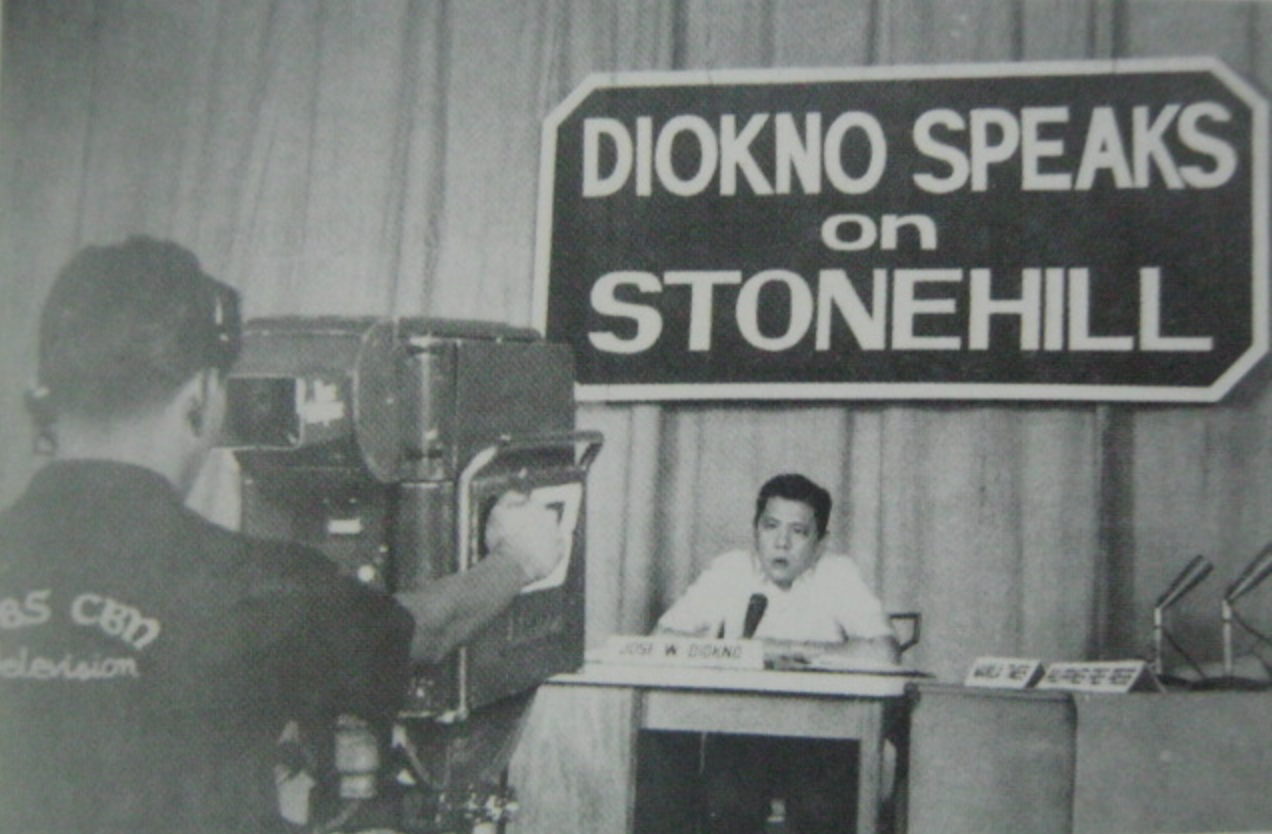
Sec. Jose W. Diokno

=== Notable secretaries of justice ===
- Sen. Jose W. Diokno, founder of the Free Legal Assistance Group (FLAG), founding chairman of the Commission on Human Rights (CHR), former senator, and chief prosecutor of the Harry Stonehill case
- Jose P. Laurel, former president and former associate justice
- Jose Abad Santos, former chief justice
- Neptali A. Gonzales, former Senate president
- Franklin Drilon, former Senate president
- Menardo Guevarra, solicitor general

== Organizational structure ==
At present, the department is headed by the Secretary of Justice,

with Seven Undersecretaries, namely

- Jesse Hermogenes T. Andres
- Jose R. Cadiz, Jr.
- Brigido J. Dulay
- Deo L. Marco
- Geronimo L. Sy
- Nicholas Felix L. Ty
- Raul T. Vasquez

Five Assistant Secretaries, namely

- Jose Arturo R. Malvar
- Majken Anika S. Gran-Ong
- Gabriel Lorenzo L. Ignacio
- Jose Dominic F. Clavano IV
- Randolph A. Pascasio

Under the Office of the Secretary are the following offices and services:

- Administrative Service
- Board of Pardons and Parole
- DOJ Action Center
- Financial Service
- Information and Communications Technology Service
- Internal Audit Service
- Library Service
- Office for Competition
- Office of Cybercrime
- Office of the Chief State Counsel (Legal Staff)
- Office of the Prosecutor General (National Prosecution Service)
- Planning and Management Service
- Refugees and Stateless Persons Protection Unit
- Technical Staff

Prosecutors are assigned to each of the regions, provinces, and cities of the Philippines.

== Attached agencies ==
The following agencies and offices are attached to the DOJ for policy and program coordination:

Agency	Head
Bureau of Corrections (BuCor)	Usec. Gregorio Catapang Jr.
Bureau of Immigration (BI)	Joel Anthony M. Viado
Land Registration Authority (LRA)	Gerardo P. Sirios
National Bureau of Investigation (NBI)	(Atty. Melvin Matibag)
Office for Alternative Dispute Resolution (OADR)	Margaret Raizza D. Andaman
Office of the Government Corporate Counsel (OGCC)	Solomon M. Hermosura
Office of the Solicitor General (OSG)	Darlene Marie B. Berberabe
Parole and Probation Administration (PPA)	Bienvenido O. Benitez Jr.
Presidential Commission on Good Government (PCGG)	Melchor Quirino C. Sadang
Public Attorney's Office (PAO)	Persida V. Rueda-Acosta

== See also ==
- Philippines Witness Protection Program
