= Land Registration Authority (Philippines) =

Land registry agency of the Philippines

- Pangasiwaan sa Patalaan ng Lupain
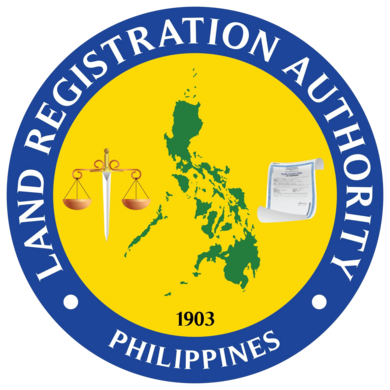
- LRA seal

Agency overview
- Formed: 1903
- Jurisdiction: Government of the Philippines
- Headquarters: Quezon City, Metro Manila, Philippines
- Employees: 2,113 (2024)
- Annual budget: ₱1.27 billion (2023)
- Agency executive: Atty Gerardo P. Sirios, Administrator
- Parent agency: Department of Justice
- Website: www.lra.gov.ph

The Land Registration Authority (LRA; Filipino: Pangasiwaan sa Patalaan ng Lupain) is an agency of the Philippine government attached to the Department of Justice responsible for issuing decrees of registration and certificates of title and register documents, patents and other land transaction for the benefit of landowners, agrarian reform-beneficiaries and the registering public in general; providing a secure, stable and trustworthy record of land ownership and recorded interests therein so as to promote social and economic well-being and contribute to the national development.

== History ==
Sir Robert Torrens originated the system of land registration known today worldwide as the Torrens system of land registration. As the commissioner of customs in South Australia, Torrens was inspired by the comparative facility with which ships or undivided shares therein were negotiated and transferred in accordance with the Merchant Shipping Acts. Becoming a register of deeds, he advised a scheme of registration of title that improved the old system of registration of deeds. He adopted a procedure under the Merchant Shipping Acts with appropriate modifications. When he became a member of the First Colonial Ministry of the Province of South Australia, he introduced in the parliament a bill providing for the adoption of his scheme of land registration. The measure was passed and came to be known as the "Torrens System".

On November 6, 1902, the Philippine Commission enacted Act 496 known as the Land Registration Act. This provided for the creation of the Court of Land Registration (CLR), the offices of the Register of Deeds and the institution in this country of the Torrens system of registration whereby real estate ownership may be judicially confirmed and recorded in the archives of the government. The system, however, actually took effect on February 1, 1903, on which date LRA may be said to have taken roots. Five judges were appointed by the Governor-General with the advice and consent of the Philippine Commission, one of whom was designated as Judge of Court and the other as Associate Judges, all of whom could be removed by the Governor-General with the advice and the consent of the Philippine Commission.

On February 11, 1913, the Cadastral Law Act (Act 2259) was enacted for compulsory registration of land titles with private ownership. Under this Act, registration of titles was judicial in nature.

The Court of Land Registration exercised jurisdiction over all applicants for the registration of titles to land or building in the Philippines, with the power to hear and determine all questions arising upon such applications.

On July 1, 1876 by virtue of Act No. 2347, the jurisdiction over land registration cases of the Court of Land Registration was transferred to the Court of First Instance. A new office, known as the General Land Registration Office (GLRO), was charged with the functions, among others, of looking into the effective implementation of the land registration law. The offices of the Register of Deeds were, per Section 192 (a) of the Revised Administrative Code, placed under the administrative supervision of the GLRO.

However, Republic Act No. 1151 abolished the GLRO and created in its stead, the Land Registration Commission (LRC), on June 17, 1954. The Commissioner of Land Registration took over the powers and functions of the GLRO, including those of the judge of the Fourth branch of the Court of First Instance of Manila. The Land Registration Commission operated under the supervision of the Department of Justice, and exercised direct supervision and control of all Registers of Deeds as well as the Clerks of Court of First Instance in land registration cases.

A registry of deeds was established in every city and every province and branch registry where legally feasible, charged with the functions of registering deeds under the Torrens System. Registers of Deeds of the different provinces and chartered cities who were appointed by the President, were under the administrative supervision and control of the Land Registration Commission.

On February 9, 1981, President Ferdinand Marcos issued Executive Order No. 649 reorganizing the LRC into the National Land Titles and Deeds Administration (NLTDRA). Operating under the administrative supervision of the Ministry of Justice, NLTDRA was implementing the laws governing the Torrens System of land registration in the Philippines.

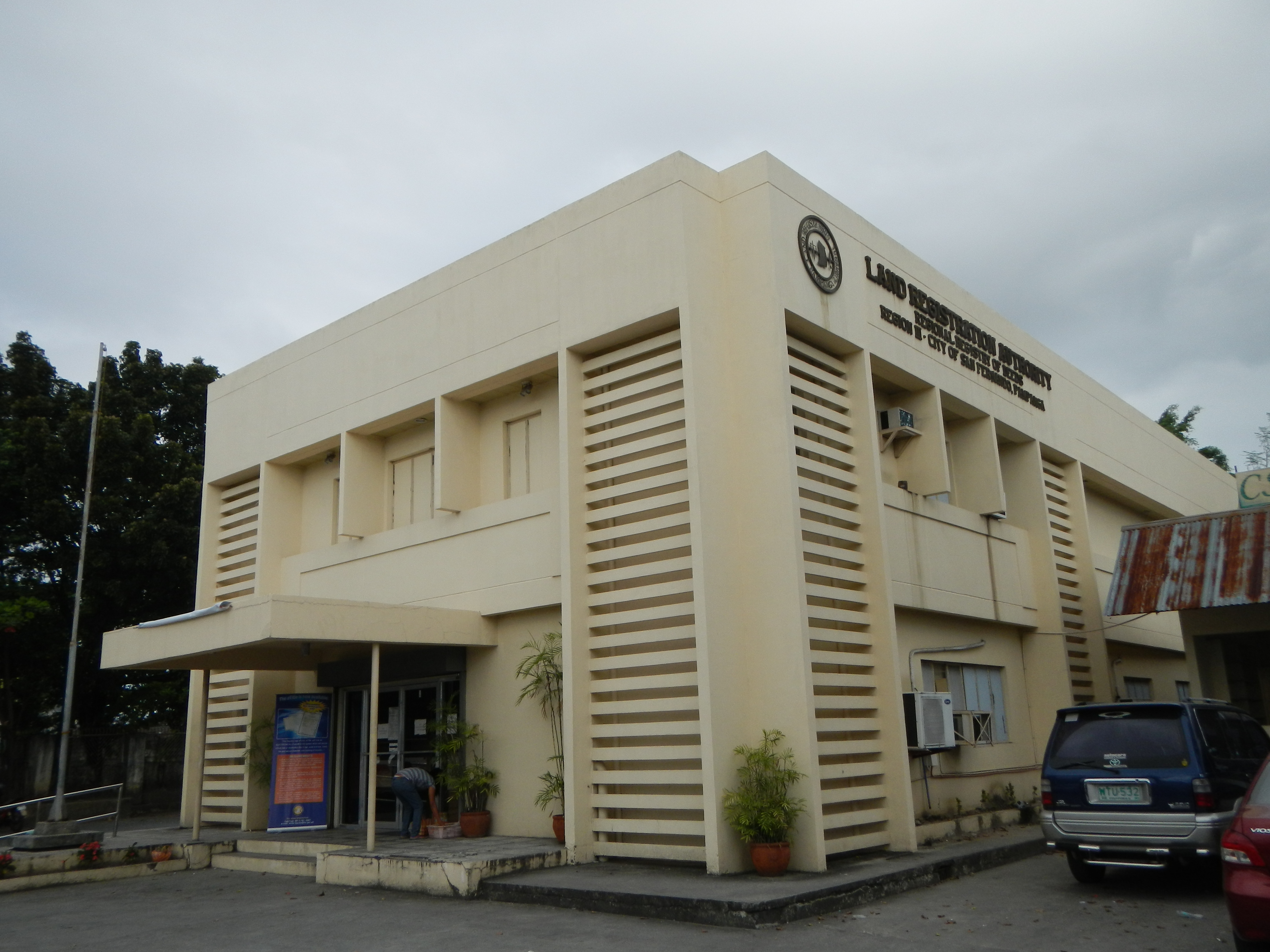
Land Registration Authority, Pampanga Provincial Capitol branch

In the President's Memorandum Circular of September 30, 1988, the latest of these changes was effected. The National Land Titles and Deeds Registration Administration (NLTDRA) became the Land Registration Authority (LRA) which was tasked to continue exercising NLTDRA's powers and functions under existing laws. This was in line with Executive Order No. 292 dated July 25, 1987, instituting the Administrative Code of 1987, which took effect on November 3, 1989.
