= Naic Church =

Roman Catholic church in Cavite, Philippines

- Diocesan Shrine and Parish of the Immaculate Conception
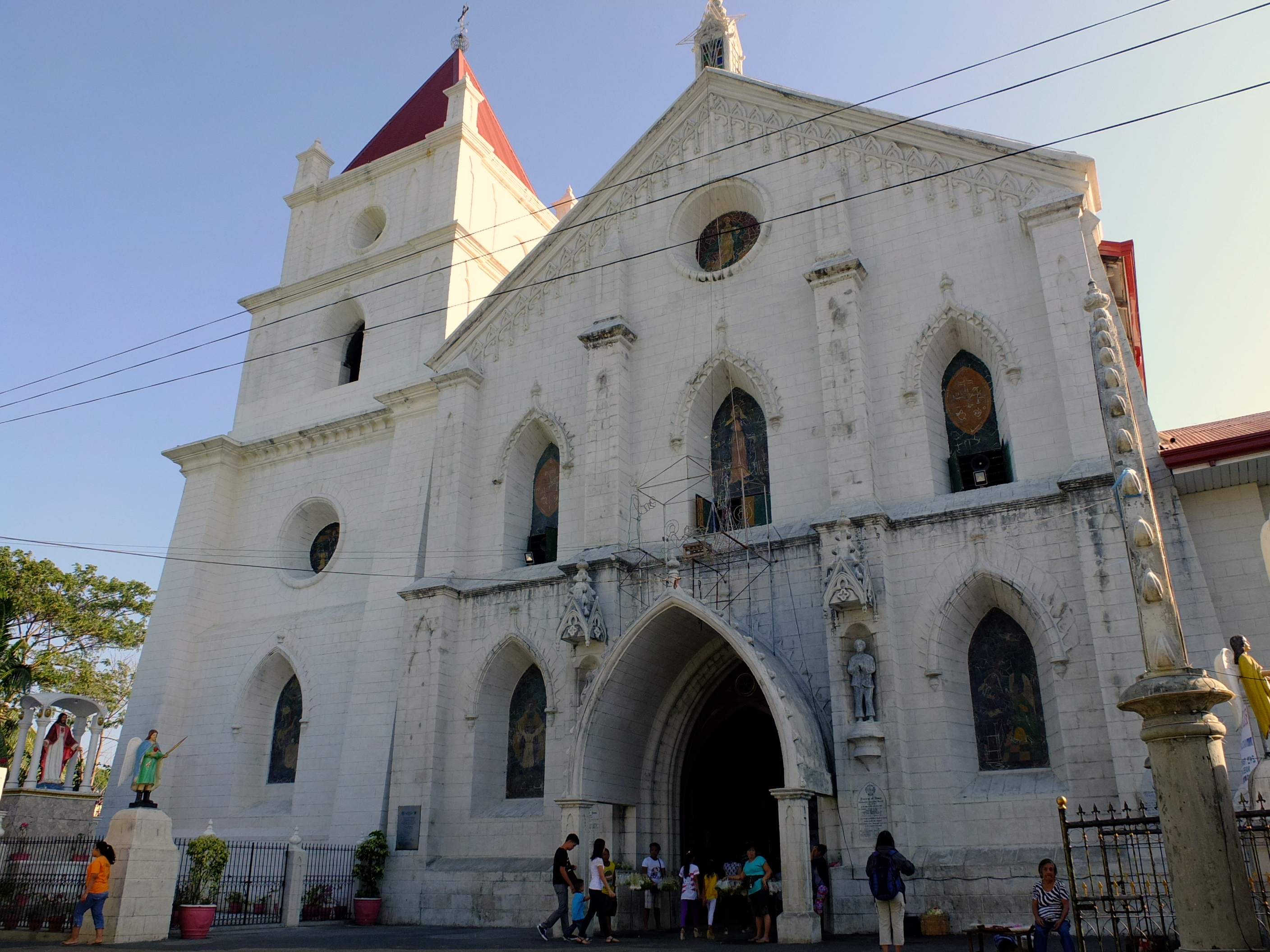
- Church facade in 2015

- Location in Luzon Location in the Philippines
- 14°19′12″N 120°45′51″E
- Location: Naic, Cavite
- Country: Philippines
- Denomination: Roman Catholic

History
- Status: Parish church and diocesan shrine
- Dedication: Immaculate Conception

Architecture
- Functional status: Active
- Architectural type: Church building
- Style: Earthquake Baroque Gothic Revival

Specifications
- Materials: Adobe stones

Administration
- Archdiocese: Manila
- Diocese: Imus

The Diocesan Shrine and Parish of the Immaculate Conception Church, commonly known as Naic Church, is a Roman Catholic church located in the municipality of Naic in Cavite, Philippines. It is under the jurisdiction of the Diocese of Imus. The church was constructed during the 1800s. When the friars discovered that the land at Naic was fertile, they became interested in settling there. It eventually led them to build the administration building of Casa Hacienda, presently occupied by the Naic Central School. Casa Hacienda de Naic is the only casa hacienda administered by friars in the Philippines that is still in use.

== History ==
It has been believed that the original location of the Naic's poblacion was at the western side of the present site of the town. It was near a bridge constructed during the time of Juan Matavacas. The change of location of the poblacion happened on 1798 during the administration of Don Miguel de la Cruz, the first acting-monsignor of the town. The parish was established on 1796 and was headed by Pedro Antonio de Escuza.

== Architectural history ==
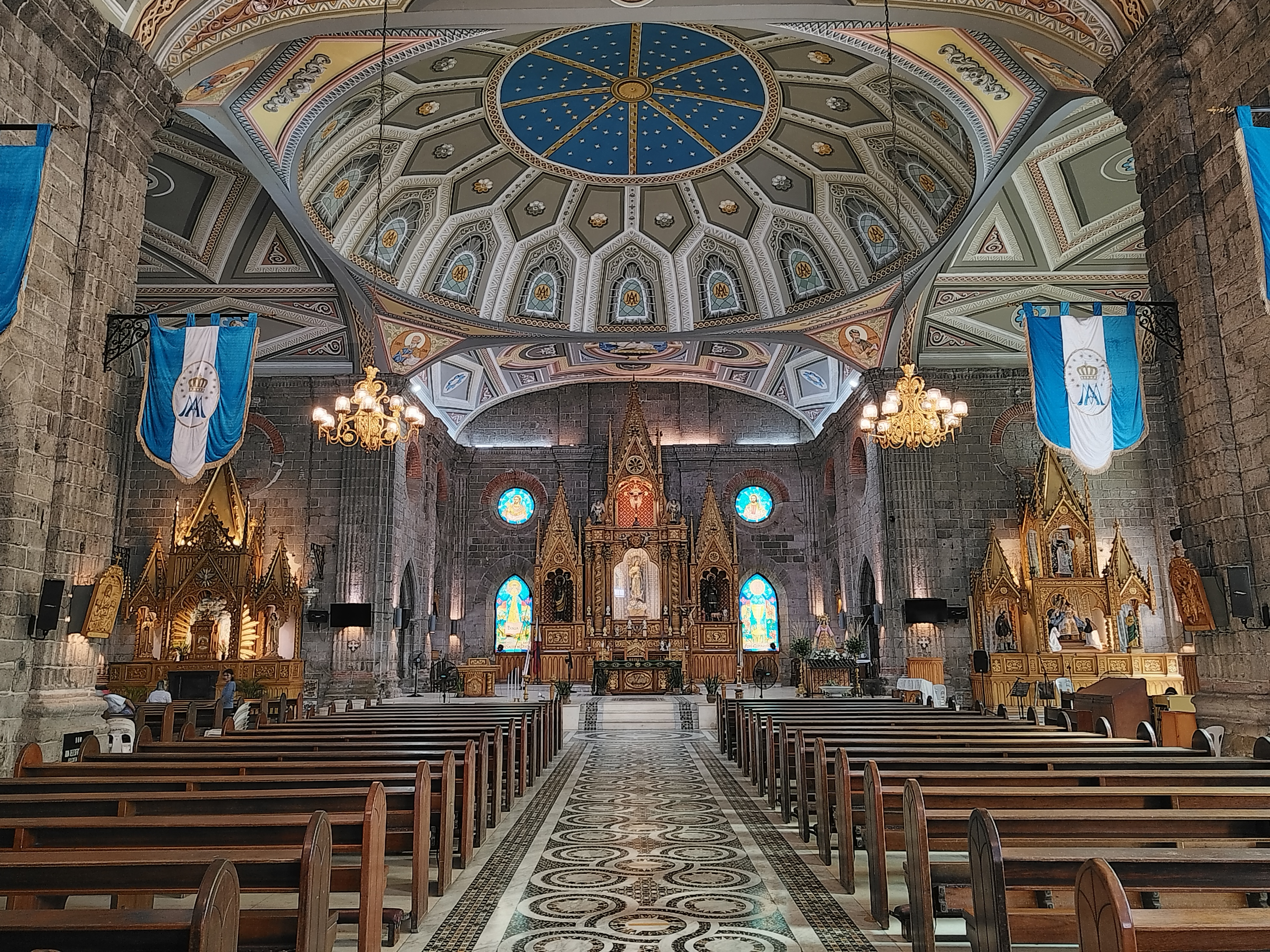
Church interior in 2023

The church, constructed during the 1800, was made up of wood and cogon grass. Later additions of the church, such as kopa, a pair of cruets, and ornamentation, were added six years after its initial construction. On 1835, the construction of a new stone church was administered by Don Pedro Florentino. Its construction resulted to influx of people - from 18 barrios, or neighborhood in 1845 to 26 barrios in 1867. It reached up to 54 barrios in 1888.

During the revolutionary period, the church convent of Naic was used as the headquarters of Andres Bonifacio after the Tejeros Convention of March 22, 1897. The Naic conference was held at the church convent. It was in this conference that the old Tagalog letter of the flag was replaced by a "Sun of Liberty" with the symbolic eight rays. The sun was shown with two eyes, a nose and a mouth.

In 2014, the church was restored by Wong Chu King Foundation. Further renovations by local craftsmen under architect Noel Gatus added intricate, classical-style mosaic floor along its central nave. The millions of triangular marbles used were provided by Kaufman Stone.

== Architectural features ==
The present church was built in the 17th century. Before World War II, the Naic Church was built in a semi-Gothic style. It was one of the tallest (about five storeys high) and the longest (almost ten blocks long) in the province of Cavite. Three major altars and two minor altars were founded in its interior. The Very Venerated Image of the Immaculate Concepcion, Patron Lady of Naic, was located in the main altar.

=== Parish priests ===
- Jose de los Reyes
- Doroteo de los Reyes
- Pedro Celestino
- Jose Dionicio
- Jose Martin
- Mateo Rivera
- Pedro Florentino
- Antonio Juanito
- Vicente Lopez
- Manuel M. Pastor
- Modesto de Castro
- Antonio Sabit
- Salustiano Marcos
- Francisco Govea
- Calixto Villafranca
- Simon Sanchez
- Galo Minguez
- Pedro Valentin
