= Naic =

Municipality in Cavite, Philippines

- Municipality
- Municipality of Naic
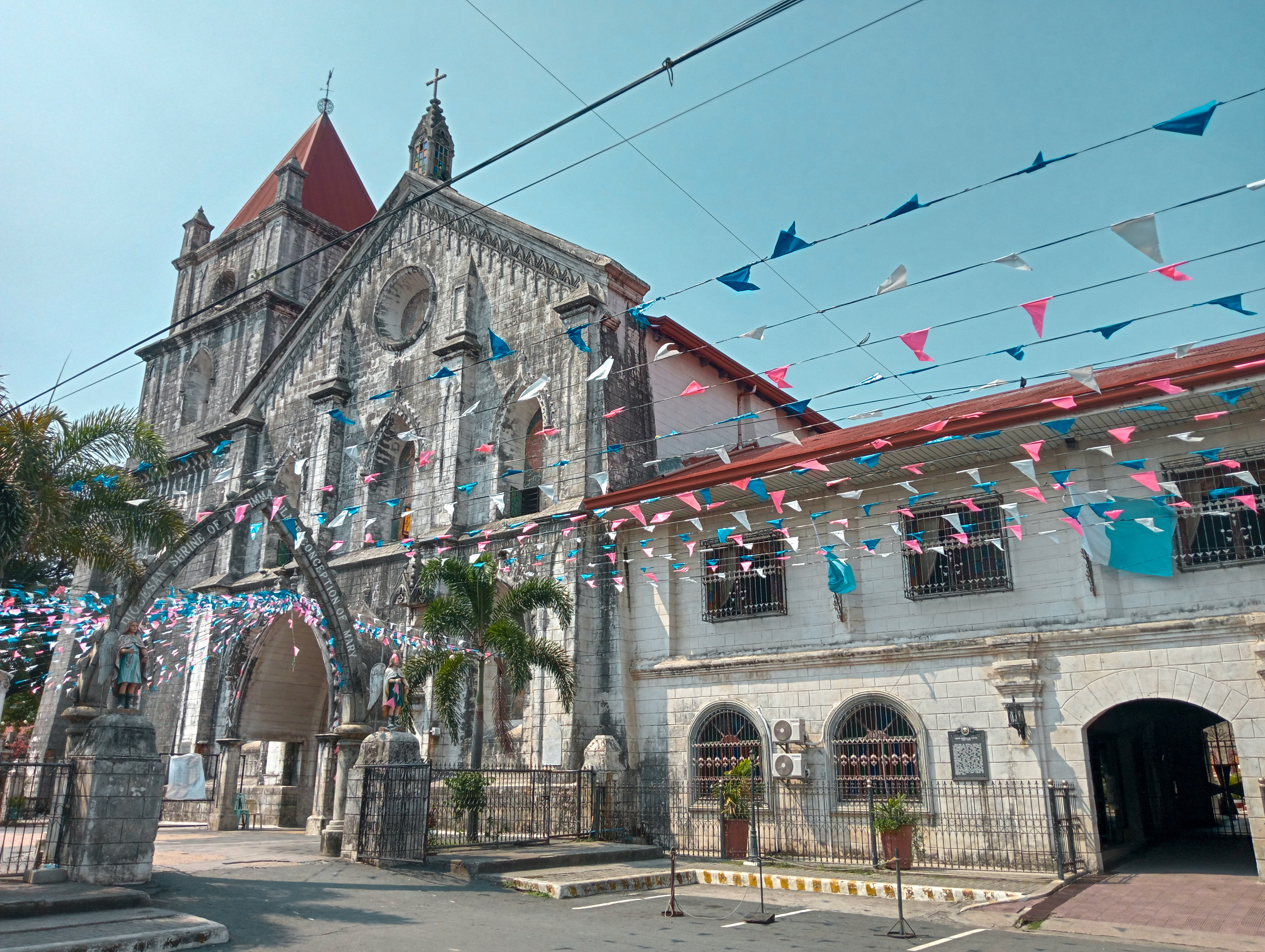
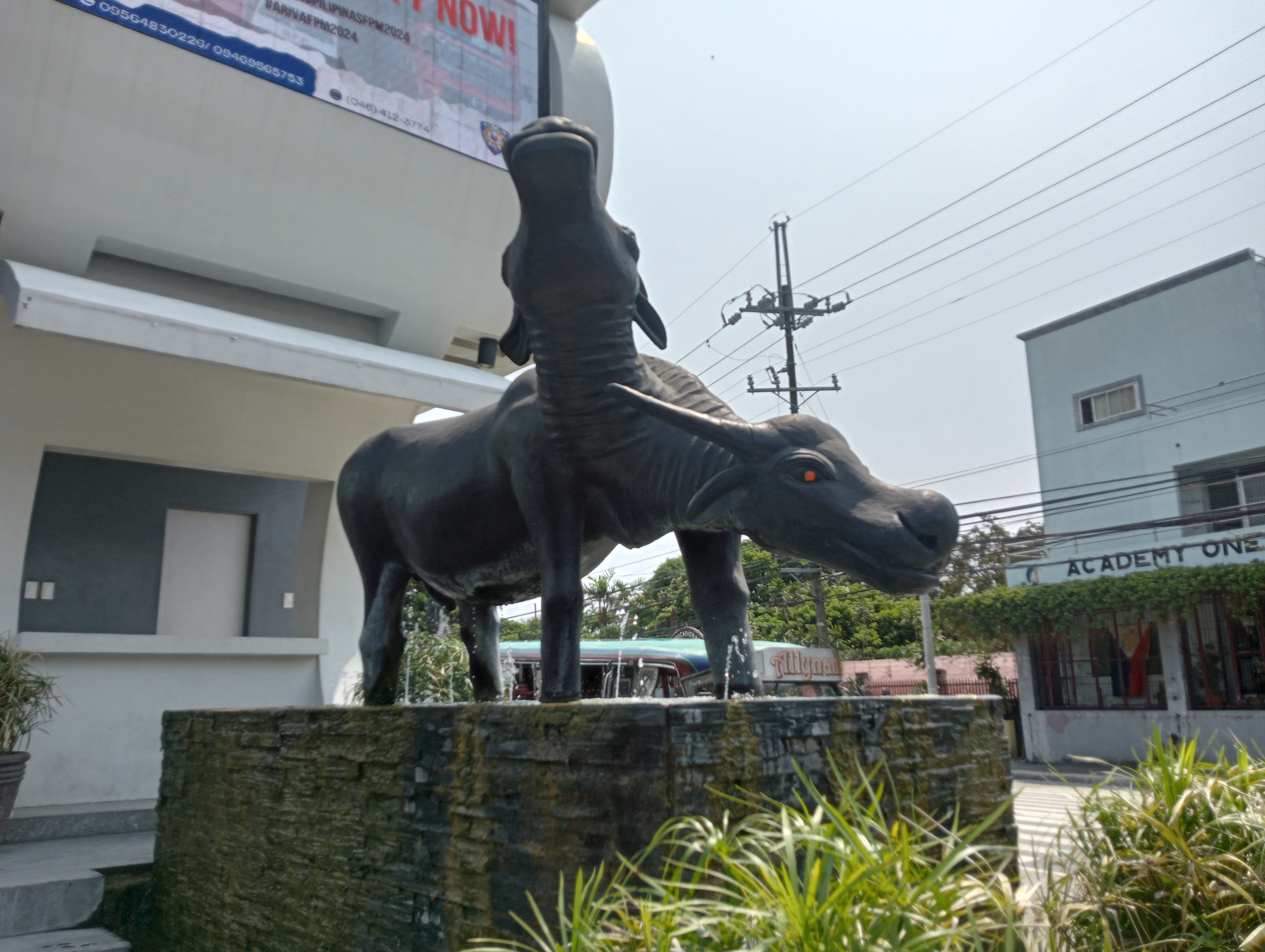
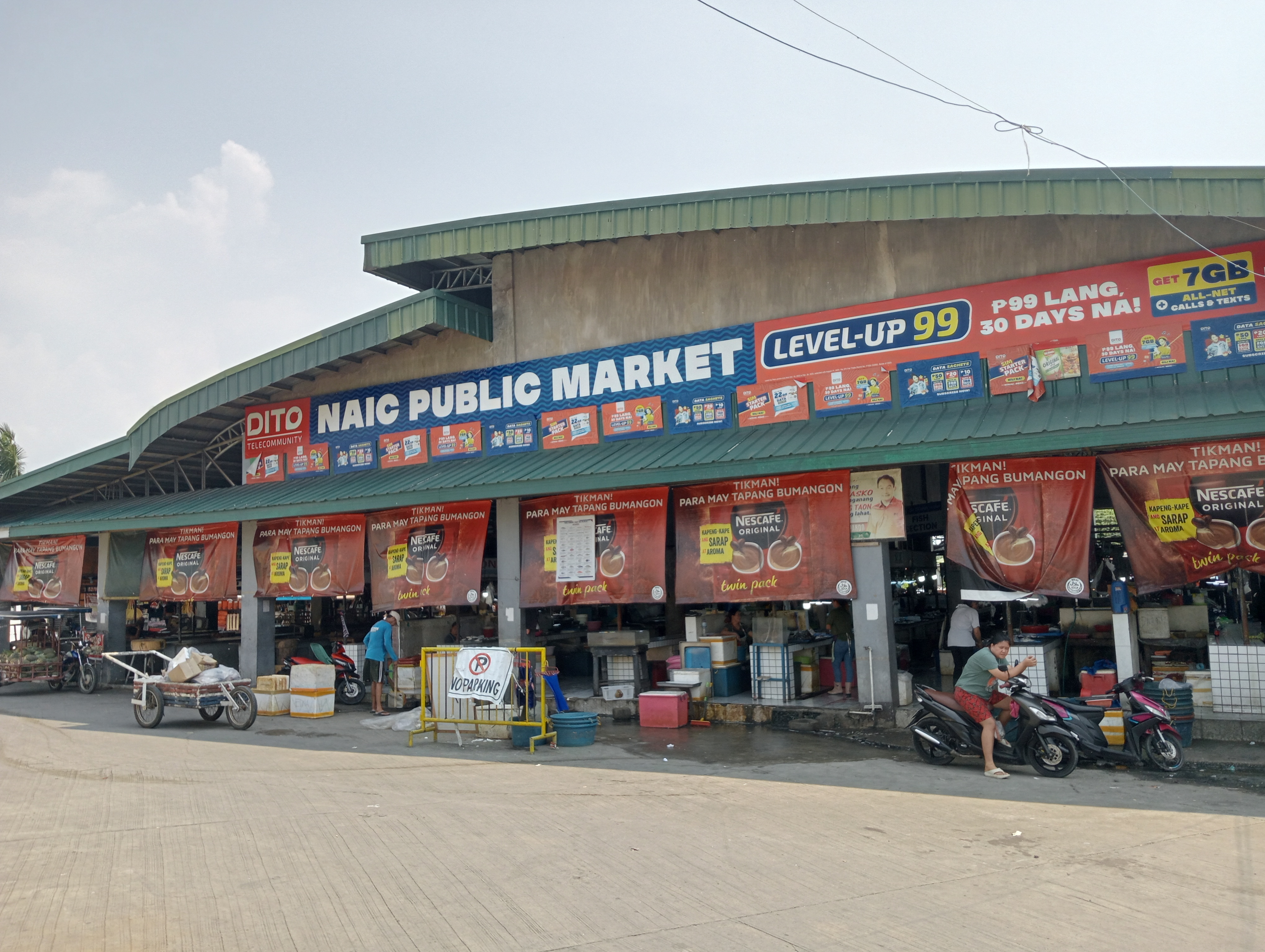
- Diocesan Shrine of the Immaculate Conception Parish Church Two Head Carabao Statue Naic Public Market

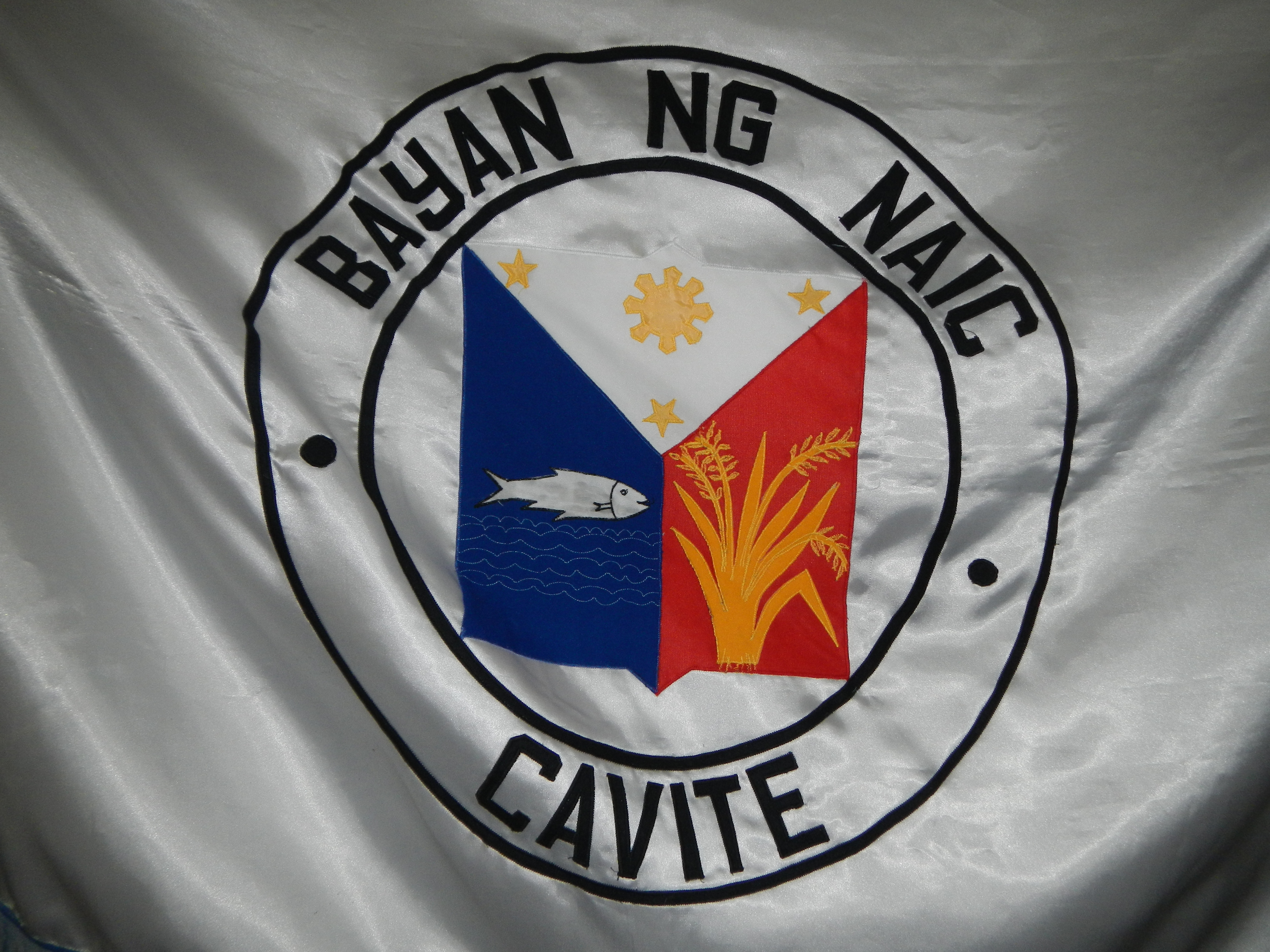
- Flag Seal
- Anthem: Himno ng Naic; Naic Hymn
- Map of Cavite with Naic highlighted
- Interactive map of Naic
- Location within the Philippines
- Coordinates: 14°19′N 120°46′E
- Country: Philippines
- Region: Calabarzon
- Province: Cavite
- District: 8th district
- Founded: 1869
- Barangays: 30 (see Barangays)

Government
  - Type: Sangguniang Bayan
  - Mayor: Rommel Anthony V. Magbitang
  - Vice Mayor: Jacinta Maria D. Remulla
  - Representative: Aniela Bianca D. Tolentino
  - Municipal Council: Members: Cesar Ryan G. Nazareno; Ryan O. Flores; Rodrigo A. Castillo; Bonifacio M. Atienza Jr.; Glennon I. Pegollo; Jerry C. Barrera; Arnel G. Milay; Raymond P. Senia
  - Electorate: 107,215 voters (2025)

Area
  - Total: 75.81 km^{2} (29.27 sq mi)
- Elevation: 39 m (128 ft)
- Highest elevation: 424 m (1,391 ft)
- Lowest elevation: 0 m (0 ft)

Population (2024 census)
  - Total: 236,978
  - Density: 3,126/km^{2} (8,096/sq mi)
  - Households: 38,935
- Demonym: Naicqueño

Economy
  - Income class: 1st municipal income class
  - Poverty incidence: 12.28% (2023)
  - Revenue: ₱ 677.9 million (2024)
  - Assets: ₱ 1,907 million (2024)
  - Expenditure: ₱ 179.6 million (2024)
  - Liabilities: ₱ 234 million (2024)

Service provider
  - Electricity: Manila Electric Company (Meralco)
- Time zone: UTC+8 (PST)
- ZIP code: 4110
- PSGC: 0402115000
- IDD : area code: +63 (0)46
- Native languages: Tagalog
- Major religions: Roman Catholicism; Protestantism; Aglipayan Church; Rizalista
- Feast date: December 8
- Catholic diocese: Diocese of Imus
- Patron saint: Our Lady of the Immaculate Conception

Naic ([ˈnaʔɪk]), officially the Municipality of Naic (Tagalog: Bayan ng Naic), is a municipality in the province of Cavite, Philippines. According to the 2024 census, it has a population of 236,978 people. Also being the 4th most largest municipality in cavite, spanning at around 75.81 km²

== Etymology ==
Naic is a former barrio of Maragondon. It has multiple accounts regarding the origin of its name. One theory suggests it comes from a native’s response, *“na-igik”*—the sound of a crying pig—when asked by a Spaniard what the pig was doing, which later evolved into Naic. Another theory proposes that it derives from the Spanish term *“Ca–Naic”*, meaning “neighboring place,” referencing its mother town, present-day Maragondon. A third theory posits that Naic is an acronym for *Nuestra Adorada Inmaculada Concepción*.

The town's name is the Spanish translation of the town's patron saint, Our Lady of Immaculate Concepcion (Nuestra Adorada Immaculada Concepcion). As an honor and reverence to Our Lady of Immaculate Conception, the town folks celebrate annually their town fiesta on every 8th day of December.

== History ==
Thousands of years ago, Naic was a part of the towering Taal Volcano. Naic was the western slope of the volcano until its internal eruption which led to the sinking of its apex in its present condition.

When the Jesuits discovered Maragondon in 1627, its total land area covers the whole of Naic, Ternate, and Magallanes. In 1758, the Jesuits founded a community in the western bank of the river (present Barangay Muzon) and made it into a "sitio" with a visita still under Maragondon.

In 1791, the community was finally made into a town with its population still in the western bank. The town was named Naic after the old archaic word "can(ia)ayic" meaning "town near one another" or "the other side" (Medina, 1992), while Alfredo B. Saulo contends that Naic is a highly cultured Tagalog word meaning "suburbs" or "countryside". Also in Malaysia, Naic means "overboard".

Moreover, due to the closeness of Naic to the population in Maragondon, Naic transferred its center in 1798 to the eastern bank of the river (the present poblacion). Also during this time, the town was already a flourishing fishing and agricultural village. On the other hand, the church, since 1797, was under the secular clergy who were mostly Filipinos. Upon the "Royal Audiencia" issued in 1849, the church was transferred to the Dominican Friars in 1865. The Dominicans upon finding out that the land in Naic was fertile, built the Casa Hacienda de Naic (the present Naic Elementary School) to be the administration building for the overseer of the larger friar lands in Naic.

The 1818 Spanish census showed the area had 942 native families and 3 Spanish-Filipino families.

In the Philippine Revolution of 1896–1898, all of the names of the towns in Cavite were Filipinized, thus, the name of Naic was changed to Naik, but was also commonly known as "Maguagi". Furthermore, five events significant to the revolution took place in Naic. These were as follows:

1. The designing of the first official flag of the country which took place in Sulok, Naic, Cavite (the present Velamart).

2. The creation of the Naic Military Agreement, a document by which Andres Bonifacio sought to assert his authority as leader of the Philippine revolutionary government in defiance of Emilio Aguinaldo's government initiated in Tejeros (Casa Hacienda de Naic).

3. The appointment of the first cabinet ministers including the Departments of Interior, Justice, Finance, and Defence (Casa Hacienda de Naic).

4. The Battle of Timalan where the Filipino revolutionists won overwhelmingly against the Spanish troops in May 1897 (Timalan, Naic Cavite).

5. The Battle of Naic where Aguinaldo declared the town to be his last defense (Poblation).

The prominent people who paved the way for the revolution in Naic included former gobernadorcillos and capitanes municipal; namely, Cirilo Arenas, Gregorio (Goyo) Jocson, in whose house General Aguinaldo recuperated from illness, Benito Poblete, and Tobal Bustamante.

A number of upper-class families were also present in other towns of Cavite, deriving their wealth from rural estates, urban properties, or successful businesses. Notable families included the Cuencas of Bacoor, the Papa, De Castro, Valentin, and Arenas families of Naic, and the Darwins of Indang.

From 1903 to 1917, the adjacent municipality of Ternate became part of Naic.

During World War II, the Taparan Guerilla Unit was founded in Naic in February 1942 by Lt. Col. Emilio Arenas, Tomas Arenas, and Jose Arenas-Paman. The unit delayed the invasion of Japanese Imperial forces and gave way to the safe flight of Naik's residents to Maragondon.

== Geography ==
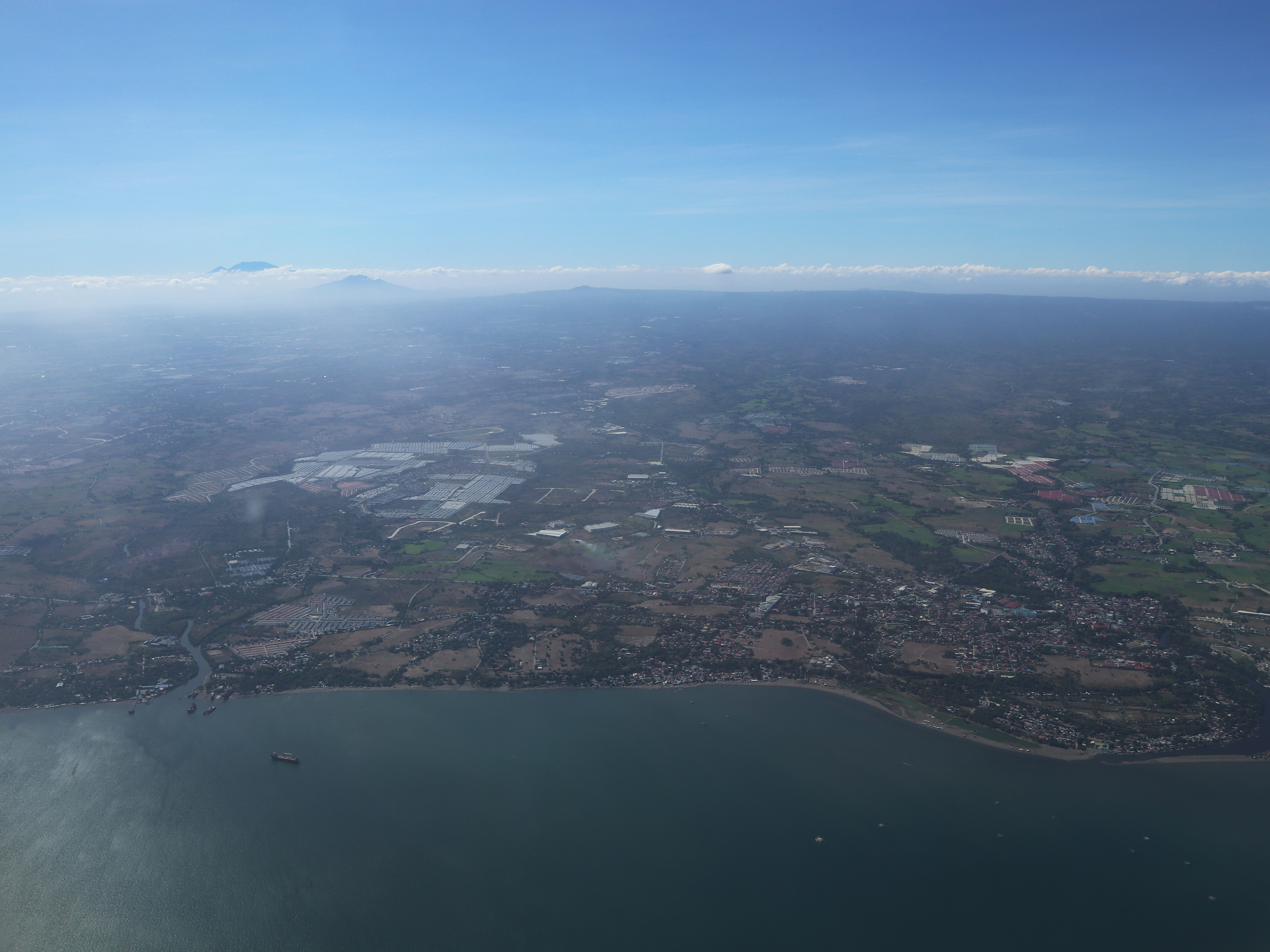
Aerial view of Naic

The municipality of Naic is located on the western part of the province along the shorelines of Manila Bay. Trece Martires City and Tanza bound it to the east. Situated beyond the southern portion of Naic is Indang and the western boundary is shared with Ternate and Maragondon. Majority of the upland towns and some of those in lowlands trade with Naic due to its strategic geographical position. The coordinates of Naic are 14°32 latitude and 120°768 longitude.

Naic is 24.14 kilometers (15.00 mi) from the provincial capital Imus, and 44.30 kilometers (27.53 mi) from the country's capital Manila.

=== Barangays ===
Naic is politically subdivided into 30 barangays, as indicated below. Each barangay consists of puroks and some have sitios.

- Bagong Kalsada
- Balsahan
- Bancaan
- Bucana Malaki
- Bucana Sasahan
- Calubcob
- Capt. C. Nazareno (Poblacion)
- Gombalza (Poblacion)
- Halang
- Humbac
- Ibayo Estacion
- Ibayo Silangan
- Kanluran Rizal
- Latoria
- Labac
- Mabolo
- Malainen Bago
- Malainen Luma
- Makina
- Molino
- Munting Mapino
- Muzon
- Palangue 2 & 3
- Palangue Central
- Sabang
- San Roque
- Santulan
- Sapa
- Timalan Balsahan
- Timalan Concepcion

=== Climate ===
Climate data for Naic, Cavite
Month	Jan	Feb	Mar	Apr	May	Jun	Jul	Aug	Sep	Oct	Nov	Dec	Year
Mean daily maximum °C (°F)	29 (84)	30 (86)	32 (90)	34 (93)	32 (90)	31 (88)	29 (84)	29 (84)	29 (84)	30 (86)	30 (86)	29 (84)	30 (87)
Mean daily minimum °C (°F)	21 (70)	20 (68)	21 (70)	22 (72)	24 (75)	25 (77)	24 (75)	24 (75)	24 (75)	23 (73)	22 (72)	21 (70)	23 (73)
Average precipitation mm (inches)	10 (0.4)	10 (0.4)	12 (0.5)	27 (1.1)	94 (3.7)	153 (6.0)	206 (8.1)	190 (7.5)	179 (7.0)	120 (4.7)	54 (2.1)	39 (1.5)	1,094 (43)
Average rainy days	5.2	4.5	6.4	9.2	19.7	24.3	26.9	25.7	24.4	21.0	12.9	9.1	189.3
Source: Meteoblue

== Demographics ==
Population census of Naic
Year	Pop.	±% p.a.
1903	9,225	—
1918	9,794	+0.40%
1939	13,813	+1.65%
1948	15,222	+1.09%
1960	27,818	+5.15%
1970	28,723	+0.32%
1975	32,130	+2.27%
1980	38,243	+3.54%
1990	51,629	+3.05%
1995	58,046	+2.22%
2000	72,683	+4.94%
2007	87,058	+2.52%
2010	88,144	+0.45%
2015	111,454	+4.57%
2020	160,987	+8.05%
2024	236,978	+9.73%
Source: Philippine Statistics Authority

In the 2024 census, the population of Naic was 236,978 people, with a density of 3,100 inhabitants per square kilometer or 8,000 inhabitants per square mile.

It is the 7th most populous municipality/city in the province. The massive increase can be observed in the year 1990 when industrialization was introduced in the Province of Cavite (including Naic). Investors established their businesses in different industrial estates that magnetized people to migrate to Cavite due to job opportunities the province offers. Another factor attributed to the increase of population is the mushrooming of housing subdivisions (such as Belmont Homes in Palangue and Dorothea Homes in both Halang and Calubcob). Natural increase also contributes to the increase in population.

Among the barangays in Naic, Barangay Sabang has the biggest population with 56,820 people while Barangay Balsahan has registered the smallest population with 270 people.

The population of Naic have grown from the past few years. In 1990 the recorded population count by the Philippine Statistics Authority is about 52,000, about 73,000 in year 2000 (which increased by 3.45%), 87,058 is recorded in 2007 (2.46% increase), about 88,000 in 2010 (0.39% increase) and 111,454 in 2015 (increased by 4.60%).

=== Languages ===
The vernacular language is Filipino, based mostly on the Tagalog of surrounding areas, and this Tagalog form used is the Manila form of spoken Tagalog which essentially become the lingua franca of the Philippines, having spread throughout the archipelago through mass media and entertainment. English is the language most widely used in education and business.

=== Religion ===
The Catholic population of Naic is primarily served by the Diocesan Shrine of the Immaculate Conception Church. And there has been fast growth of other Protestant denominations including Iglesia ni Cristo. Aglipayan Church is the third majority denomination in town.

There are several Rizalista groups in Naic that practice their faith and venerate José Rizal. These groups often blend traditional Filipino beliefs with elements of Christianity, focusing on the divinity and teachings of Rizal. They believe that Rizal will return to deliver his followers from oppression and poverty.

== Economy ==
Poverty incidence of Naic (%)

Source: Philippine Statistics Authority

== Government ==
=== Local government ===
The Municipality of Naic is led by its own mayor and vice mayor. The vice mayor servers as the ex officio presiding officer of the Sangguniang Bayan, which has eight regular members or councilors elected at-large.

=== Elected officials ===
The following are the elected officials of the town elected last May 12, 2025 which serves until June 30, 2028:

Position	Official	Party
Mayor	Rommel Anthony V. Magbitang	UNIDO
Vice Mayor	Jacinta Maria D. Remulla	NPC
Councilor	Florencio B. Nazareno	NPC
Councilor	Ryan O. Flores	UNIDO
Councilor	Rodrigo A. Castillo	UNIDO
Councilor	Bonifacio M. Atienza Jr.	NPC
Councilor	Glennon I. Pegollo	NPC
Councilor	Jerry C. Barrera	NPC
Councilor	Arnel G. Milay	NPC
Councilor	Raymond P. Senia	NPC
ABC President
Roger N. Camilo
SK Federation President
Darlaine Mae A. Benesen

=== Congress representation ===
Naic is represented in the House of Representatives by Cavite eighth district representative Aniela Bianca Tolentino.

== Education ==
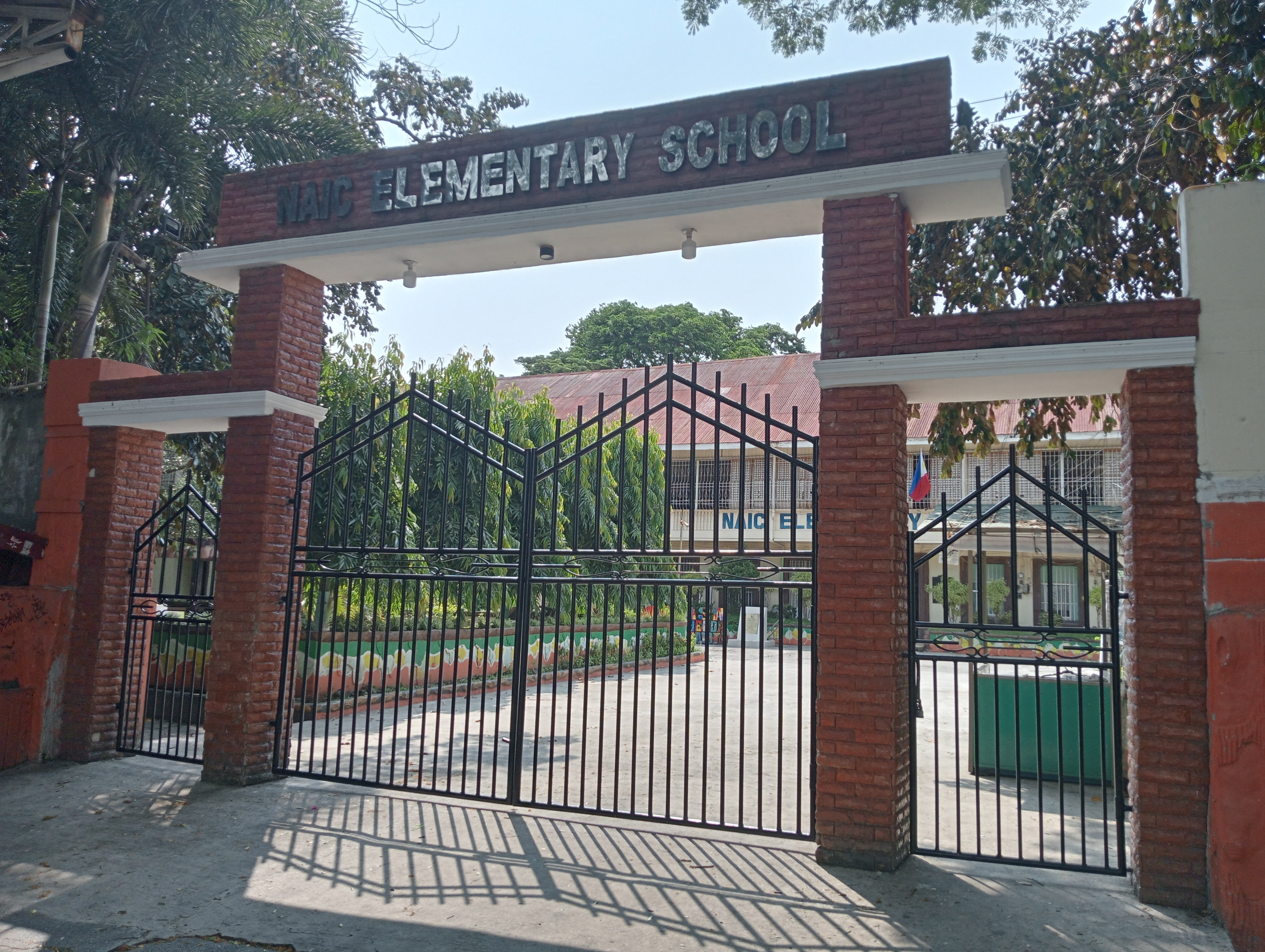
Naic Elementary School

Education in the Philippines is managed and regulated by the Department of Education (DepEd), Commission on Higher Education (CHED) and Technical Education and Skills Development Authority (TESDA). DepEd is responsible for the K–12 basic education; it exercises full and exclusive control over public schools and nominal regulation overprivate schools, and it also enforces the national curriculum that has been put in place since 2013. CHED and TESDA, on the other hand, are responsible for higher education; CHED regulates the academically-oriented universities and colleges while TESDA oversees the development of technical and vocational education institutions and programs in the country.

There are three schools district offices which govern all educational institutions within the municipality. They oversee the management and operations of all private and public, from primary to secondary schools. These are the Naic I Schools District Office, Naic II Schools District Office, and Naic III Schools District Office.

=== Primary and elementary schools ===
- Balsahan Elementary School
- Bancaan Elementary School
- Bucana Elementary School
- Bucana Sasahan Elementary School
- Calubcob Primary School
- Ciudad Nuevo Elementary School
- Halang Elementary School
- Ibayo Elementary School
- Jovita Yuvienco Elementary School
- Labac Elementary School
- Lino Bocalan Elementary School
- Mabulo Elementary School
- Malainen Bago Elementary School
- Molino Elementary School
- Munting Mapino Elementary School
- Muzon Elementary School
- Naic Elementary School
- Naic Star Learning Center
- Palangue 2 Primary School
- Timalan Hillsview Integrated School
- Palangue 3 Elementary School
- Palangue Central School
- Petronilo L. Torres Memorial Elementary School
- San Roque Elementary School
- Timalan Elementary School
- Villa Apolonia Elementary School
- Verdant Homes Elementary School

=== Secondary schools ===
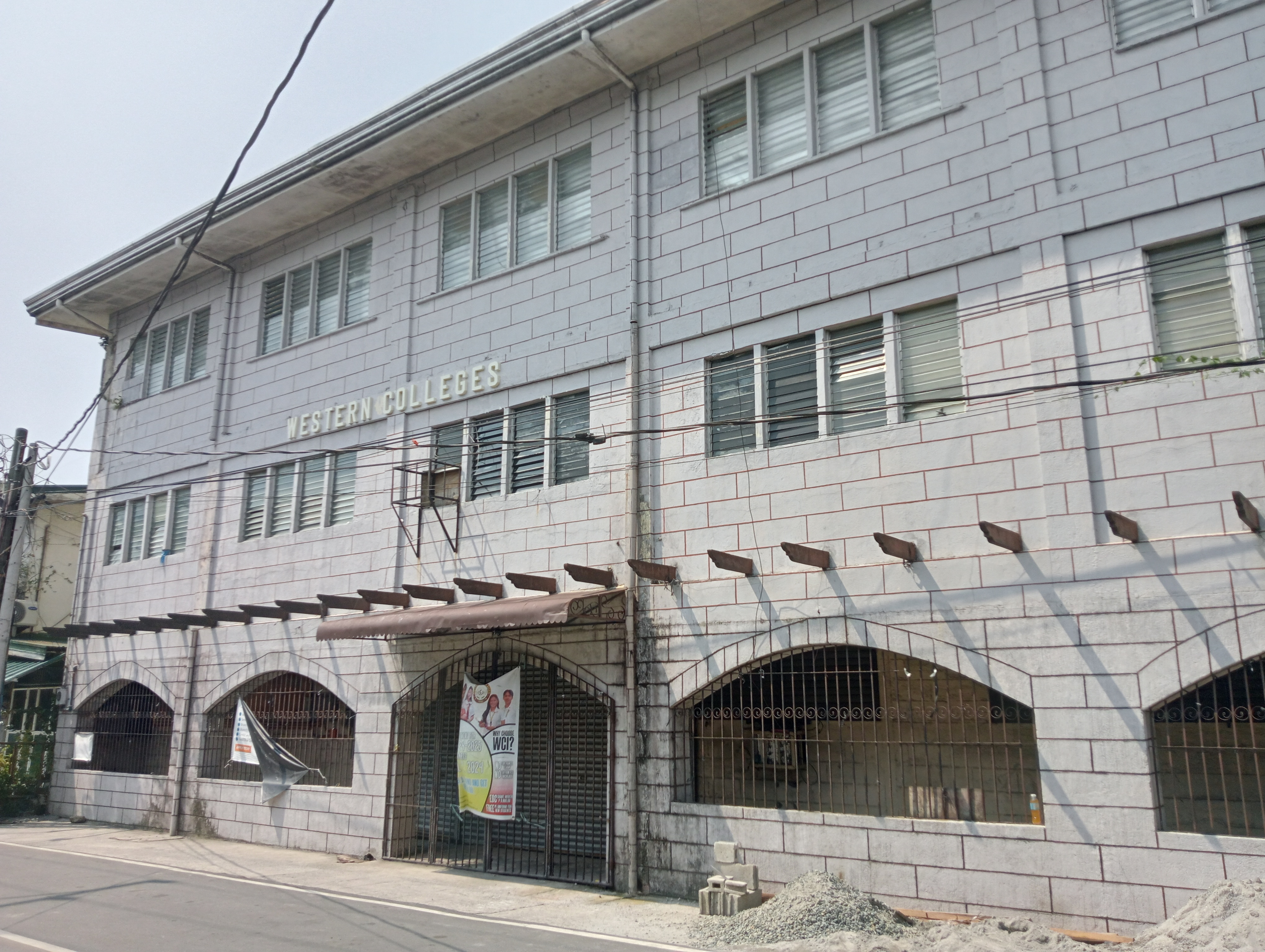
Western Colleges, Inc.

- Abeniano Delos Santos Academy
- Cavite Community Academy
- Cavite State University Laboratory Science High School
- Centro de Naic National High School
- Ciudad Nuevo de Naic National High School
- Immaculate Concepcion School
- King's Way Christian Academe
- La Vlaize Integrated Science School
- Naic Coastal National High School
- Naic Integrated National High School
- Naic Senior Highschool (Stand-alone)
- Pueblo del Mar National High School
- The Valley Cathedral Academy

=== Higher educational institutions ===
- Colegio de Montessori
- Colegio de Naic
- Far East Asia Pacific Institute of Tourism Science and Technology
- FEAPITSAT Colleges
- Granby Colleges of Science and Technology
- Naic West Point College
- Western Colleges
- Cavite State University - Naic Campus

== Gallery ==
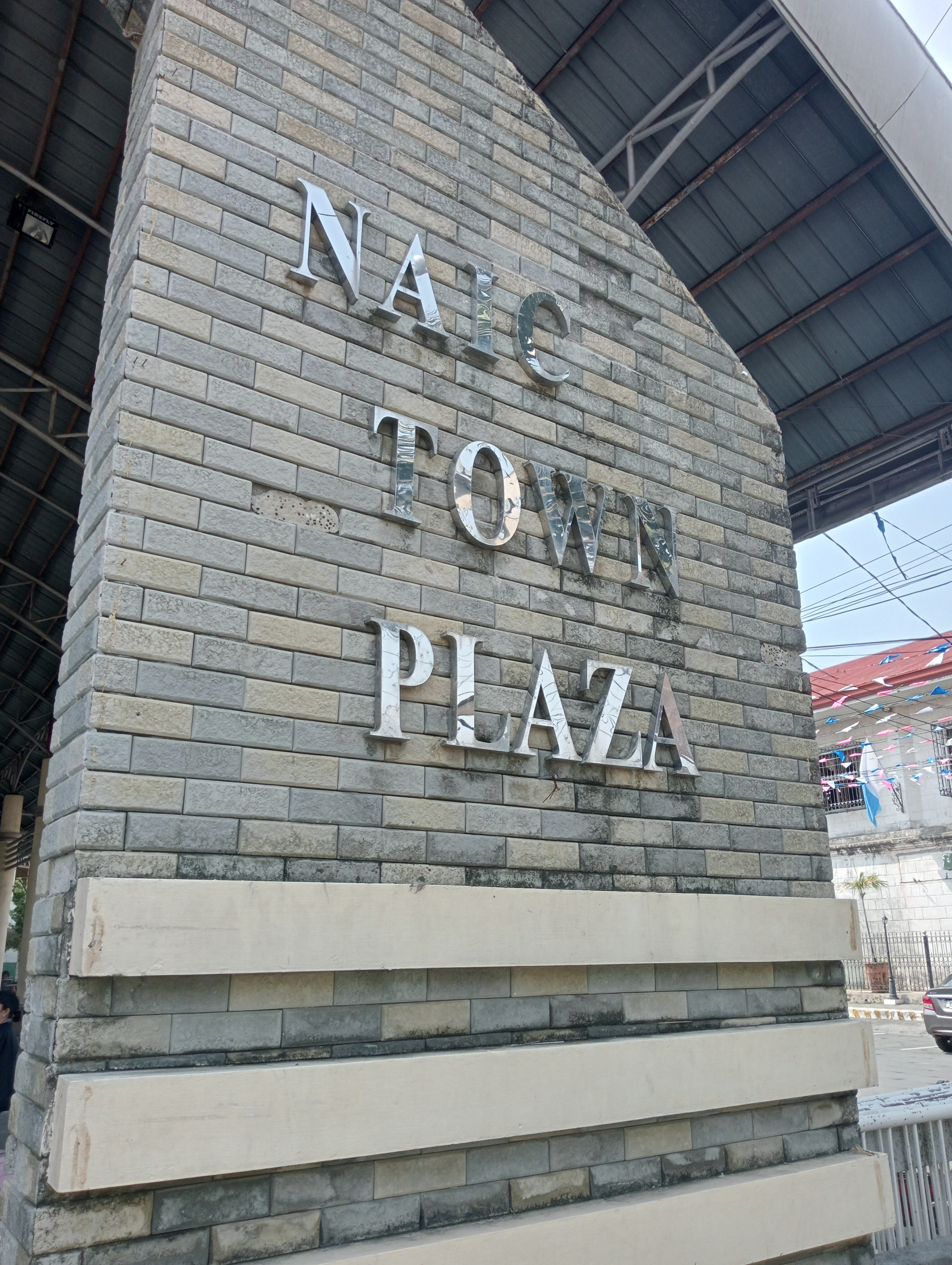
Naic Town Plaza

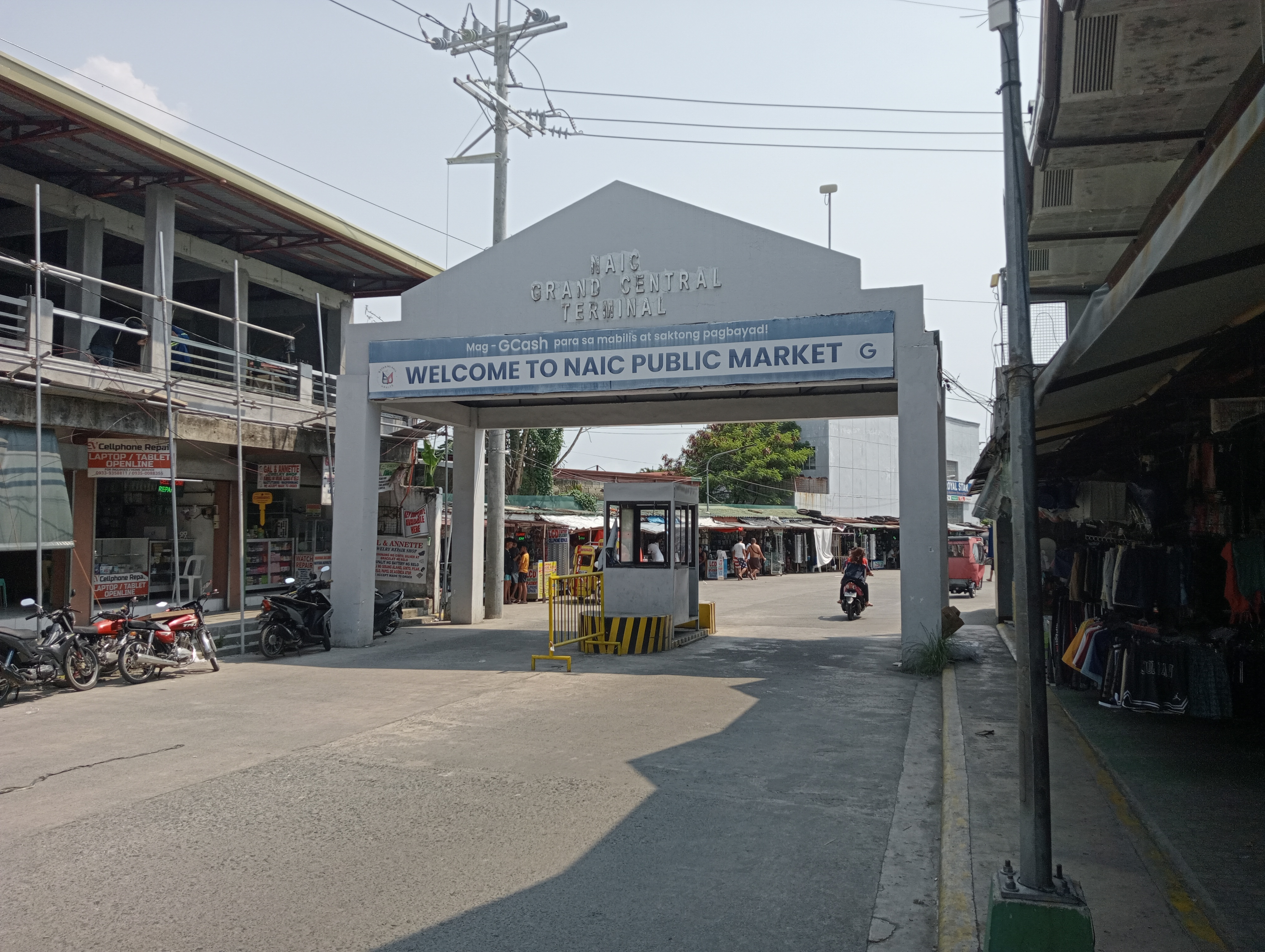
Naic Grand Central Terminal

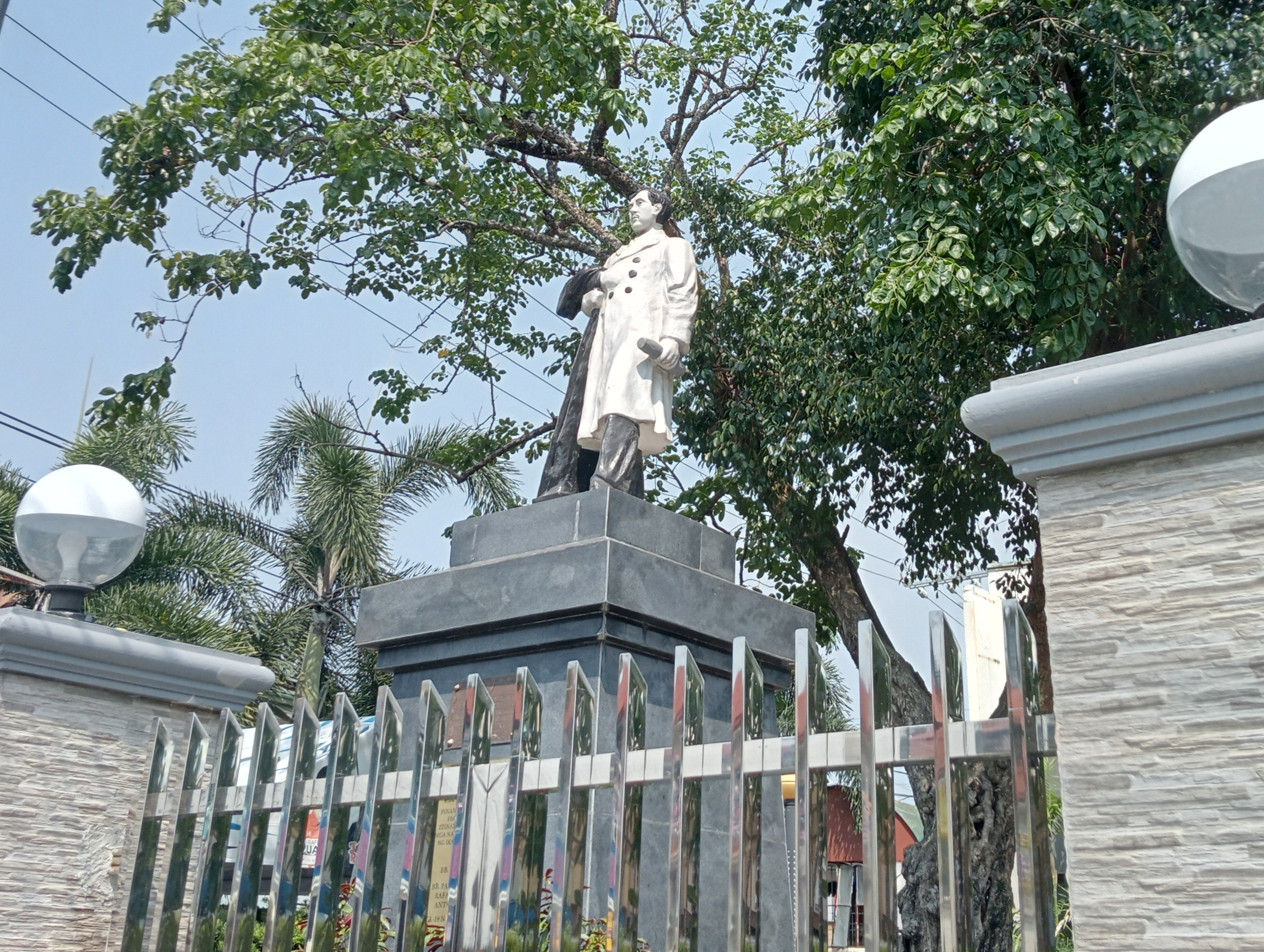
Jose Rizal Monument

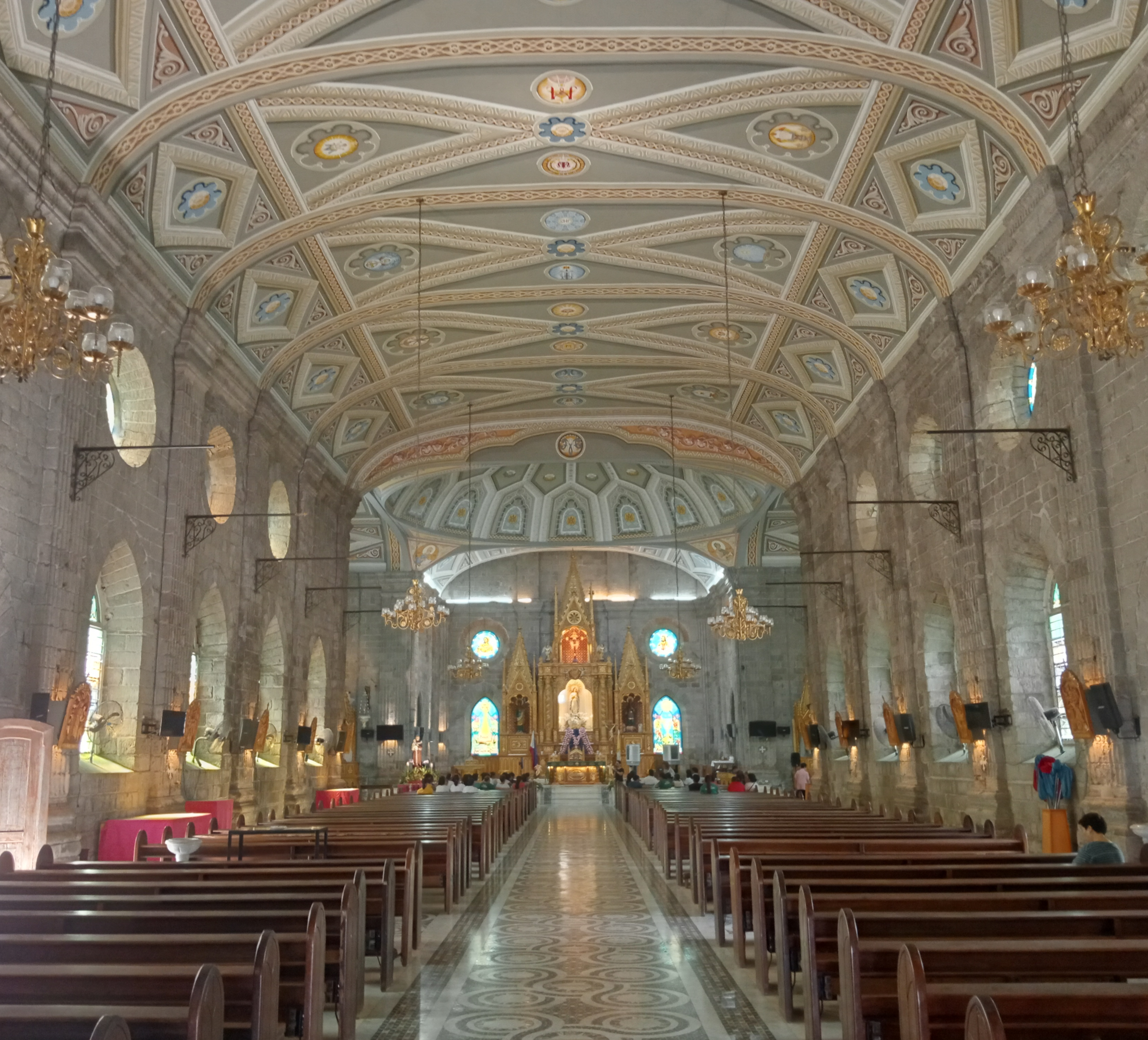
Interior of Naic Church

== See also ==
- Casa Hacienda de Naic
- Naic Military Agreement
