= Parole and Probation Administration =

Law enforcement agency in the Philippines

- Pangasiwaan sa Parole at Probasyon

Agency overview
- Formed: July 24, 1976
- Jurisdiction: Philippines
- Agency executive: Wilson R. Suba, OIC Administrator
- Parent agency: Department of Justice
- Website: probation.gov.ph

The Parole and Probation Administration (PPA; Filipino: Pangasiwaan sa Parole at Probasyon) is an agency of the Philippine government under the Department of Justice (DOJ) responsible for administering the country's parole and probation system and providing community-based alternatives to imprisonment for qualified offenders.

== History ==
Probation was first introduced in the Philippines during the American colonial period (1898–1945) with the enactment of Act No. 4221 of the Philippine Legislature on August 7, 1935. This law created a Probation Office under the Department of Justice. On November 16, 1937, after barely two years of existence, the Supreme Court of the Philippines declared the Probation Law unconstitutional because of some defects in the law's procedural framework.

In 1972, House Bill No. 393 was filed in Congress, which would establish a probation system in the Philippines. This bill avoided the objectionable features of Act 4221 that struck down the 1935 law as unconstitutional. The bill was passed by the House of Representatives, but was pending in the Senate when Martial Law was declared and Congress was abolished.

In 1975, the National Police Commission Interdisciplinary drafted a Probation Law. After 18 technical hearings over a period of six months, the draft decree was presented to a selected group of 369 jurists, penologists, civic leaders and social and behavioral scientists and practitioners. The group overwhelmingly endorsed the establishment of an Adult Probation System in the country.

On July 24, 1976, Presidential Decree No. 968, also known as Adult Probation Law of 1976, was signed into Law by the President of the Philippines.

The operationalization of the probation system in 1976–1977 was a massive undertaking during which all judges and prosecutors nationwide were trained in probation methods and procedures; administrative and procedural manuals were developed; probation officers recruited and trained, and the central agency and probation field offices organized throughout the country. Fifteen selected probation officers were sent to the U.S. for orientation and training in probation administration. Upon their return, they were assigned to train the newly recruited probation officers.

The probation system started to operate on January 3, 1978. As more probation officers were recruited and trained, more field offices were opened. There are at present 204 field offices spread all over the country, supervised by 15 regional offices.

== See also ==
- Department of Justice
