= Felicita G. Bernardino =

Filipino educator, civil servant, and politician (1918–1983)

Member of the Interim Batasang Pambansa
- In office 1978–1983
- Constituency: Region III / Bulacan

Personal details
- Born: 1918
- Died: 1983 (aged 64–65)
- Spouse: Teodorico S. Bernardino
- Children: 4
- Education: University of the Philippines (MEd)
- Profession: Educator and civil servant

Felicita Gonzales Bernardino (1918–1983), generally cited as Felicita G. Bernardino, was a Filipino educator, senior civil servant, and politician. She served as the first regional director of the Department of Education and Culture in Central Luzon, became undersecretary and later political deputy minister for non-formal education, and represented Region III and Bulacan in the Interim Batasang Pambansa from 1978 until her death in office in 1983.

== Education ==
Bernardino was born in 1918. In 1961, she completed a Master of Education degree at the University of the Philippines. Her thesis, The role of the Rural Improvement Clubs of Bulacan in the promotion of the adult education program in the Philippines, examined the participation of rural women's organisations in adult education.

A law enacted in her memory records that she subsequently earned a Doctor of Education degree.

== Education career ==
Bernardino began her career as a classroom teacher. She subsequently served as a head teacher, assistant principal, principal, school supervisor, assistant superintendent, superintendent, assistant regional director, regional director, and deputy minister.

The Department of Education's Central Luzon regional office identifies Bernardino as its first regional director. She was designated officer-in-charge of the regional office in 1974 and served as regional director from 1975 to 1978.

In June 1978, the government periodical The Republic reported that Bernardino had been appointed undersecretary of education for non-formal education. The position had been created under Presidential Decree No. 1139 to coordinate programmes for people who were unable to obtain formal schooling.

Following the adoption of ministerial titles under the parliamentary government, she was described as the first deputy minister responsible for non-formal education.

== Non-formal education ==
As deputy minister, Bernardino promoted non-formal education as a complement to formal schooling. At a 1979 seminar-workshop on productive skills and rural development, she called for education programmes to be coordinated with the identification of raw materials, product marketing, and personnel training so that participants could develop income-generating work in cottage and home industries.

Bernardino identified farmers, workers, small entrepreneurs, and people with little or no formal schooling as priority groups. She supported the use of radio and television broadcasts, seminars, workshops, programmed lessons, and short courses. She also argued that non-formal education should address health, nutrition, childcare, home economics, and social justice in addition to literacy and vocational training.

She chaired the sub-cabinet committee responsible for the Lingap ng Pangulo sa Barangay school-on-the-air programme. A 1981 UNESCO inventory described the committee as the programme's policy-making body and identified Bernardino as both an assemblywoman and political deputy minister of education and culture for non-formal education.

== Political career ==
In 1978, Bernardino became a member of the Interim Batasang Pambansa representing Region III and Bulacan.

She continued to hold responsibilities in the education ministry while serving in the legislature. The Philippine Electoral Almanac records that she died in office in 1983.

== Civic work and personal life ==
The preamble of Batas Pambansa Blg. 863 lists Bernardino as an officer or member of several civic organisations, including the Rural Improvement Club of the Philippines, Civic Assembly of Women of the Philippines, Philippine Mental Health Association, and National League of Women Voters.

She was married to Teodorico S. Bernardino, a former vice mayor of Marilao, Bulacan, who predeceased her. They had four children: Fe Marie Dora, Teodore, Eleanore, and Michael.

== Legacy ==
In 1984, the Batasang Pambansa enacted Batas Pambansa Blg. 863, renaming the Marilao National Trade School as the Assemblywoman Felicita G. Bernardino Memorial Trade School.

== Selected works ==
- Bernardino, Felicita Gonzales (1961). The role of the Rural Improvement Clubs of Bulacan in the promotion of the adult education program in the Philippines (MEd thesis). University of the Philippines.
- Bernardino, Felicita G. (June 1979). “Non-formal education and countryside development”. The Curriculum Journal. 10 (1): 7–9.
- Bernardino, Felicita G.; Ramos, Marcos S. (1981). Non-formal education in the Philippines. Malolos, Bulacan: Reyvil Bulakeña Publishing Corporation.
