= Naic Military Agreement =

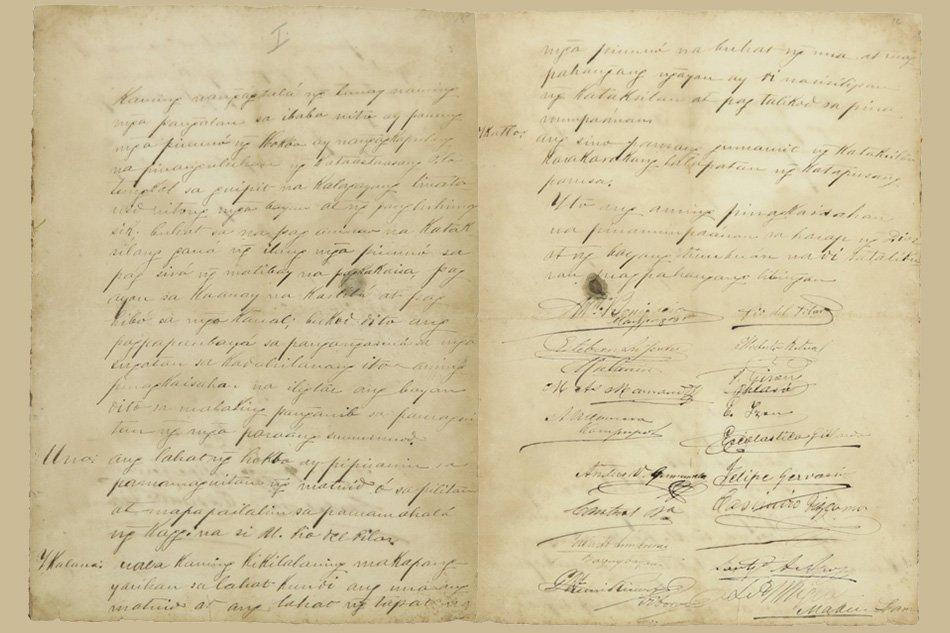
The Naic Military Agreement.

The Naic Military Agreement was a document prepared on April 18, 1897, in which a number of participants in the Tejeros Convention repudiated the convention results. This repudiation, which followed the Acta de Tejeros issued on March 23, would later cost Andres Bonifacio his life. Bonifacio would be tried for treason at Maragondon, Cavite on May 10, 1897, and sentenced to death.

== English translation ==
The Act was handwritten in the Tagalog language. An English translation follows:

Naik Military Agreement
sunduang Militar sa Bayan ng Naik

We who sign this below with our true names, all leaders of the Army convened at a meeting presided over by the Supreme President to discuss the critical situation of the pueblos and the revolution; having discerned that certain chiefs have committed Treason by destroying the strength that comes from unity, by coming to an agreement with the Spanish enemy and deceiving the soldiers, and also by neglecting to tend to the wounded, it is therefore our resolve to rescue the people from this grave danger by the following means:

First: all troops shall be unified, by persuasion or force, under the command of General Pio del Pilar.
Second: we shall recognize no authority other than reason, and all the loyal leaders who from the outset and until now have been seen not to have committed Treason or turned their backs on their sworn duty.
Third: whoever commits treason shall immediately merit the ultimate punishment.

This is our agreement, and we swear before God and the country of our birth not to betray it unto the grave.

Andres Bonifacio - Maypagasa
Pio del Pilar
Esteban San Juan - Mulanin
Modesto Ritual
M. A. Mainam
P. Giron - Palaso
A .Villanueva - Kampupok
E. Izon
Andres V. - Gumamela
Escolastico Gillardo
Conteral Ba…[ ?]
Jacinto Lumbreras - Bagong bayani
Felipe Gervasin
G. Artemio Ricarte - Vibora
Casimiro Vizcarra [?]
Santiago A. - Apoy
L. San Miguel - Maku-Lam [ ?]

Note: Signatures in the above where spelling is uncertain are indicated by [?].
