= List of Filipino generals in the Philippine Revolution and the Philippine–American War =

This is a compendium of the Filipino generals, commanders, leaders and who fought during the Philippine Revolution, Filipino-American War and the Post-war insurgencies against US occupation of the Philippines. There are 165 generals listed in this article.

== General officers ==
Filipino generals in the Philippine Revolution of 1896 and the Filipino-American War of 1899
Name	Grade^{a}	Affiliation^{b}	Province^{c}
1. Gregorio Aglipay	General, Religious Auxiliary; Lieutenant General: Vicario General Castrence (Military Vicar General); Founder of the group called as Liwanag (Light), an auxiliary of the Katipunan; Co-founder and first Supreme Bishop of the "Philippine Independent Church"	First Philippine Republic; Revolutionary Government of the Philippines; Katipunan (Liwanag)	Victoria, Tarlac: Military campaigns in Ilocos Norte
2. Baldomero Aguinaldo	Lieutenant General: Commander of general of the revolutionary forces in the southern Luzon provinces (1901); First Philippine Republic (1898–1901)- Secretary of War and Marine; Revolutionary Government of the Philippines (1898–1899)- Secretary of War and Public Works; Republic of Biak-na-Bato (1897) – Secretary of Treasury; Tejeros Convention-Tejeros Revolutionary Government (1897) – Director of Finance; President of Magdalo Council - Katipunan; President of the Association of Veterans of the Revolution (1912-1915)	First Philippine Republic; Revolutionary Government of the Philippines; Republic of Biak-na-Bato; Tejeros Revolutionary Government; Katipunan (Magdalo)	Cavite
3. Crispulo Aguinaldo	Lieutenant General	Magdalo	Cavite
4. Emilio Aguinaldo	Generalissimo: President of the "First Philippine Republic"; Generalissimo and Commander-in-chief of the "Philippine Republican Army"; Minister Marshal; Leader of the Hong Kong Junta; Founder of the Association of Veterans of the Revolution.	First Philippine Republic; Revolutionary Government of the Philippines; Republic of Biak-na-Bato; Tejeros Revolutionary Government; Katipunan (Magdalo)	Cavite
5. Jose Alejandrino	Brigadier General: He was a contributor to La Solidaridad and one of the members of the Propaganda Movement in Spain along with Jose Rizal, Marcelo H. del Pilar, Mariano Ponce and Graciano Lopez Jaena; He was part of Aguinaldo's Hong Kong Junta, the exiled Revolutionary Government of the Philippines; Along with Felipe Agoncillo, José Maria Basa and Mariano Ponce, he helped organised the Consejo Revolucion	First Philippine Republic; Republic of Biak-Na-Bato; Revolutionary Government of the Philippines; Katipunan	Arayat, Pampanga
6. Felix Aliño	Commanding General-Katipunan General: Brother Hilaro Aliño was another Katipunan General; Brothers Potenciano and Sulpicio Aliño were also active members of the Philippine revolution in the Visayas	Katipunan in Cebu; Cebu Revolutionary Government; First Philippine Republic	Talisay, Cebu
7. Hilario Aliño	Commanding General-Katipunan General: Brother Felix Aliño was another Katipunan General; Brothers Potenciano and Sulpicio Aliño were also active members of the Philippine revolution in the Visayas	Katipunan in Cebu; Cebu Revolutionary Government; First Philippine Republic	Talisay, Cebu
8. Elias Angeles	Brigadier General: Commander of Guerilla Forces in Bicol Region	First Philippine Republic	Ambos Camarines
9. Mariano Álvarez	Lieutenant General: President of Magdiwang Council	First Philippine Republic; Katipunan (Magdiwang)	Cavite
10. Santiago Álvarez	Brigadier General: Commander-in-chief-Magdiwang Army; Captain General of Magdiwang Army	Katipunan (Magdiwang)	Cavite
11. Pascual Álvarez	*Brigadier General	Katipunan (Magdiwang)	Cavite
12. Vicente Álvarez	Lieutenant General: Datu Tumanggung (Royal Marshall of Camp) – title bestowed by the Sultan of Sulu; Governor-General Diego de los Ríos was defeated by the forces of General Vicente Alvarez in Fort Pilar (April 1899)	First Philippine Republic; Katipunan in Cebu; Republic of Zamboanga	Zamboanga: Guerrilla campaign against U.S in Basilan and Misamis provinces
13. Servillano Aquino	Commanding General-First Philippine Republic	First Philippine Republic	Pampanga
14. Bonifacio Aranas	Brigadier General: One of the commanders of the Battle of Tres de Abril under General Leon Kilat; Executed by the Spanish Government in Barangay Carreta on April 18, 1898. He was the only Filipino rebel officer allowed by Spanish military authorities in Cebu to wear his full uniform as General	First Philippine Republic; Katipunan in Cebu	Mambajao, Camiguin: Mambajao, Camiguin; Cebu; Bohol
15. Juan Araneta	Commanding General-Philippine Republic: "Tan Juan" (Don Juan) nom de guerre; Secretary of War of Republic of Negros; "Acta de Capitulacion-1898” - documented the surrender of the last Spanish Governor General, Don Diego de Los Rios to Gen. Aniceto Ledesma Lacson (Presidente) and Gen. Juan “Tan Juan” Araneta (Secretary of War)in Bacolod City	Federal State of the Visayas; Republic of Negros; First Philippine Republic	Negros
16. Pablo Araneta	Brigadier General: Chief of the Expeditionary Forces of the Federal Republic of the Visayas under General Martin Delgado; Commanding General of the Panay Revolutionary Forces; First Philippine Republic	Republic of Negros; Federal State of the Visayas	Panay: Iloilo
17. Primitivo Artacho	Commanding General-Philippine Republic: Brother of Isabelo Artacho, along with Felix Ferrer, was one of the writers of the Constitution of Biak-na-Bato Republic	First Philippine Republic; Hong Kong Junta (Filipino revolutionaries exiled to Hong Kong); Republic of Biak-na-Bato; Katipunan	Vigan, Ilocos Sur: Biak na Bato Republic (San Miguel, Bulacan)
18. Marcelino Aure	Brigadier General: "Alapaap" (Cloud) nom-de-guerre; General of Southern Luzon command of General Mariano Trias	First Philippine Republic; Katipunan (Magdiwang)	Noveleta, Cavite
19. Ramón Avanceña	Brigadier General: Legal adviser to the Federal Republic of the Visayas, the revolutionary governments of the provinces of Iloilo, Capiz and Antique; Peace negotiator between Philippine Revolutionary government and U.S. Government in the Philippines; Chief Justice of the Supreme Court of the Philippines (1925-1941)	First Philippine Republic; Federated States of the Visayas; Revolutionary Governments of Iloilo, Capiz, and Antique	Iloilo: Villa de Arevalo, Iloilo City
20. Hermogenes Bautista	Brigadier General	Katipunan (Magdiwang)	Bayanbayanan, Marikina
21. Vito Belarmino	Major General	Magdalo	Silang, Cavite
22. Ramon Bernardo	Commanding General-Katipunan General: One of the first brigadier generals appointed by Andres Bonifacio during the initial uprising in Manila; One of the Commanding generals in the Battle of San Juan del Monte (August 30, 1896)	Katipunan	Pandacan, Manila
23. Andrés Bonifacio	Commander-in-chief: President of Republika ng Katagalugan (Tagalog Republic)- also known as Haring Bayang Katagalugan ("Sovereign Nation of the Tagalog People", or "Sovereign Tagalog Nation"); Supremo (Head) of the Katipunan (January 1895 – 1896)- Third President; Leader of the Tondo, Manila "Katagalugan" chapter of the Katipunan; One of the founding fathers of the Katipunan; Field Marshal and Commander-in-Chief of the Katipunan (Katagalugan) Army, President of the Tagalog Republic)	Katipunan; Tagalog Republic	Tondo, Manila
24. Ciriaco Bonifacio	Commanding General-Katipunan General: Older brother of Andrés Bonifacio; Killed during the arrest of Andres Bonifacio	Katipunan; Tagalog Republic	Tondo, Manila
25. Procopio Bonifacio	Commanding General-Katipunan General: Younger brother of Andrés Bonifacio	Katipunan; Tagalog Republic	Tondo, Manila
26. Tomas Cabling	Brigadier General: Also noted as Tomas Kabling	First Philippine Republic; Revolutionary Government of the Philippines; Katipunan	Nueva Ecija
27. Juan Cailles	Major General: He took over General Paciano Rizal as Commanding General of Laguna Forces ( July 1900); General Emilio Aguinaldo appointed him as Brigadier General as military governor of Laguna and Tayabas (Quezon province) in 1898-1899; One of the foreign (French-Indian descent) generals of the Philippine Revolution; Commanding officer of "Batallon Trias" under General Mariano Noriel's regiment	Tagalog Republic; First Philippine Republic; Katipunan	Nasugbu, Batangas: Santa Cruz, Laguna - Military headquarters, campaigns in Laguna; Mabitac, Laguna - victorious battle against American force commanded by Colonel Benjamin F. Cheatham, Jr
28. Eduardo Calceta	Commanding General-Philippine Republic: Jefe General" (Chief of the Army) in Bohol (appointed by General Emilio Aguinaldo on January 16, 1899); Republic of Bohol - Adviser for Justice	First Philippine Republic; Federated States Of Visayas; Republic of Negros; Republic of Bohol	Cavite: Resided in Bohol
29. Fernando Canon	Brigadier General: Revolutionary Government of the Philippines(1898–1899)- Secretary of Welfare and Director-General of Public Works	First Philippine Republic; Revolutionary Government of the Philippines; Katipunan	Biñan, Laguna: Military campaigns during Filipino-American War in Nueva Vizcaya
30. Jorge Capili	Insurgent General: Insurgent General, post-Brigandage Act of 1902; Guerrilla General, post-capture of President Emilio Aguinaldo	Federated Republic of Visayas; First Philippine Republic	Ormoc, Leyte: guerrilla campaigns in Cadumay, Maasin, Tanauan municipalities
31. Nicolas Capistrano	Commanding General-Philippine Republic: Military Chief of Troops in Cagayan de Oro and Misamis	First Philippine Republic in Cagayan de Misamis	Angat, Bulacan (Barangay Marungko)
32. Juan Castañeda	Commanding General-Philippine Republic: He used the pen name “Langgam” (Ant) and was the founder of Pilar Lodge No. 15 of the Free Masonry of the Philippines	Tagalog Republic as headed by General Miguel Malvar; First Philippine Republic; Katipunan	Imus, Cavite
33. Arsenio Climaco	Brigadier General	Federated States of Visayas; First Philippine Republic; Katipunan in Cebu	Cebu City
34. Juan Climaco	Brigadier General	Federated States of Visayas; First Philippine Republic; Katipunan in Cebu	Cebu City
35. Venancio Concepcion	Major General	Katipunan; First Philippine Republic	Iloilo
36. Berixio Consola	Insurgent general: Insurgent General - Post- Brigandage Act of November 12, 1902; Guerrilla General, post-capture of President Emilio Aguinaldo	Tagalog Republic of General Miguel Malvar; First Philippine Republic; Revolutionary Government of the Philippines; Katipunan	Batangas: Military campaigns during Filipino-American War in Batalan Bato and Lobo, Batangas
37. Anatalio Contreras	Field guerrilla Commander (post-capture of President Emilio Aguinaldo)	General Luciano San Miguel - guerrilla forces July 1, 1902- July 1, 1903; First Philippine Republic; Katipunan	Meycauayan, Bulacan: Guerrilla campaign in Rizal and Manila
38. Ciriaco Contreras	Guerrilla General, post-capture of President Emilio Aguinaldo	General Luciano San Miguel - guerrilla forces July 1, 1902- July 1, 1903; First Philippine Republic; Katipunan	Meycauayan, Bulacan: Guerrilla campaign in Rizal and Manila
39. Esteban Contreras	Brigadier General: May 4, 1898– lead an attack to Spanish military in Capiz; December 1898 defeated Spanish troops in the town of Pila	Federated States of Visayas; First Philippine Republic; Katipunan in the Visayas; Revolutionary leader in Panay	Capiz: Western Visayas; Panay Island
40. Gregorio Coronel	Brigadier General: One of the first brigadier generals appointed by Andres Bonifacio during the initial uprising in Manila; member of the 1896 Katipunan War Cabinet	Katipunan; Pro-Andrés Bonifacio	Caloocan
41. Angel Corteza	Commanding General-Philippine Republic: Commanding General of the Southern Zone- appointed during revolutionary assembly to create a provisional Visayan Revolutionary Government (Santa Barbara, Iloilo, 1898)	Federated States of Visayas; First Philippine Republic; Katipunan in the Visayas; Ilonggo Revolutionary leader	Santa Barbara, Iloilo: Military campaigns in the Visayan region
42. Francisco De Asis	Commanding General-Katipunan General: Known as "Heneral Kiko" and "Labe" (Lock) – Katipunan nom de guerre,	Katipunan	Manila: Military activities in Balara, Pantayanin, Masuyod, areas of present Rizal Province
43. Ciriaco De Guzman	Field Guerrilla Commander (Katipunan) under General Luciano San Miguel (1898-1899): Katipunan Commander under Andress Bonifacio (1896)	First Philippine Republic; Tagalog Republic; Katipunan, Trustee of Andres Bonifacio	Meycauayan, Bulacan
44. Martin Delgado	Lieutenant General: General-in-Chief of the Revolutionary Army in Panay; Chief of the Liberation Army (Jefe del Ejercito Libertador) on February 2, 1901; First Governor of Iloilo under American administration	Federal State of the Visayas; Provisional Revolutionary Government of the Visayas and Mindanao; First Philippine Republic	Santa Barbara, Iloilo
45. Julian De La Cruz	Commanding General-Katipunan General: General of Magdiwang Faction Army	First Philippine Republic; Katipunan-Magdiwang	Manila
46. Pedro De La Cruz	Colorum General-Religious and Agrarian insurrection: Commander of guerrilla forces in Samar and Leyte islands; One of the leaders of "Pulahan" religious-auxiliary brigade and "Babaylan" revolutionaries; Considered as a Colorum leader; Post -Brigandage Act of 1902 Commander	Pulahan; First Philippine Republic; Katipunan	Leyte: Samar
47. Sinforoso De La Cruz	Division General: Major General	First Philippine Republic; Katipunan	Bulacan
48. Tiburcio De Leon	Major General	First Philippine Republic; Katipunan-Magdiwang; Katipunan	Bulacan
49. Francisco Del Castillo	Commanding General-Katipunan General: Appointed as Katipunan General in Aklan and Panay by Andres Bonifacio (1897)	Pro-Andrés Bonifacio; Katipunan in Panay	Aklan
50. Gregorio Del Pilar	Brigadier General: Known for the Battle of Tirad Pass	First Philippine Republic; Revolutionary Philippine Government; Member of the Hong Kong Junta; Katipunan	Bulakan, Bulacan (Barangay San Jose)
51. Pío del Pilar	Brigadier General: Katipunnan nom de guerre – "Pang-una" (Number One)	First Philippine Republic; Revolutionary Philippine Government; Katipunan (Matagumpay)	Makati
52. Aguedo Del Rosario	Commanding General-Katipunan General: One of the first Brigadier Generals appointed by Andres Bonifacio in the initial uprising in Manila; The Katipunan Supreme Council (August 1896) – Secretary of Interior; "Isok" - Katipunan nom de guerre	Katipunan; Pro-Andrés Bonifacio	Boac, Marinduque
53. Valentín Díaz	Major General	First Philippine Republic; Hong Kong Junta; Pro-Emilio Aguinaldo; Katipunan Co-Founder and Treasurer (1849-1916)	Paoay, Ilocos Norte
54. Ananias Diokno	Brigadier General: Also noted as Ananias Diocno; General in command of Naval forces that landed in Samar and Leyte	First Philippine Republic; Pro-Emilio Aguinaldo	Taal, Batangas: Naval missions in the Visayas
55. Felipe Estrella	Commanding General-Katipunan General: One of the leaders of Republic of Kakarong Sili along with General Eusebio "Maestrong Sebio" Roque; Killed in battle against Captain Jose Santa Maria's Pro-Spanish Volunteers in San Rafael, Bulacan; General Felipe Estrella Bridge (Malolos) was dedicated to commemorate his heroism.	Republic of Kakarong Sili; Supported by General Mariano Alvarez and the Magdiwang Council; Katipunan (Balangay Dimas-Alang)	Malolos, Bulacan: Campaigns in Nueva Ecija
56. Salvador Estrella	Brigadier General	First Philippine Republic; Pro-Emilio Aguinaldo	Malolos, Bulacan
57. Edilberto Evangelista	Lieutenant General	Revolutionary Government of the Philippines; Katipunan (Magdalo)	Cavite
58. Cornelio Felizardo	Insurgent General: Insurgent General - Post- Brigandage Act of November 12, 1902; Brigadier General; Guerrilla commander Batangas-Laguna zones	Repúbliká ng̃ Katagalugan - Tagalog Republic (Macario Sakay); Republic of Katagalugan and Army of Liberation"- under General Miguel Malvar; First Philippine Republic; Katipunan	Cavite: guerrilla campaigns in Laguna and Batangas
59. Vicente Fernández	Commanding General-Katipunan General	Magdiwang-Katipunan; Katipunan	Laguna
60. Ambrosio Flores	Major General: Secretary of War after General Antonio Luna; Assistant Director of War, Malolos Republic; One of the Aides of General Emilio Aguinaldo; Former Spanish Military Officer (1860-1899)	First Philippine Republic	Manila: One of the commanders of the Battles of Polo and Calumpit in Bulacan
61. Braulio Flores	Division General: Mayor of Inabanga	Federated States Of Visayas; First Philippine Republic; Republic of Negros; Republic of Bohol	Inabanga, Bohol
62. Luis Flores	Commanding General-Katipunan General: Provisional Revolutionary Governor of Cebu; One of the revolutionary leaders in Cebu and supporter of General Pantaleon "Leon Kilat" Villegas; Katipunan nom de guerre - "Unos" (Storm); General for War Plans- appointed by General Gil Domingo and General Teodoro Plata	Federal States Of Visayas (December 17, 1898); Provisional Revolutionary Government of the Visayas (November 17, 1898); First Philippine Republic; Pro-Andres Bonifacio; Katipunan in Cebu	Cebu
63. Anastacio Francisco	General, Chief of Medicine and Health: Brigadier General; Vice President of Central Government of Luzon; Military Chief of Sanitation (Jefe Sanidad Militar), Medical doctor graduate of University of Santo Tomas; Opened the first Military hospital in Cavite along with Colonel Agaton Papa Cecilio, MD. and Colonel Sebastian De Castro, MD.	First Philippine Republic; Katipunan	Santa Cruz, Manila: Cavite
64. Leandro Fullon	Brigadier General	Federal State of the Visayas; First Philippine Republic; Katipunan	Hamtic, Antique
65. Troadio Galicano	Brigadier General: Commander of Philippine Revolutionary forces of the Southern Cebu Sector	Cebu Revolutionary Army; First Philippine Republic; Federal State of Visayas; Katipunan	Carcar, Cebu
66. Pantaleon Garcia	Division General: Commanding General of Central Luzon- appointed by General Emilio Aguinaldo	First Philippine Republic; Magdalo Faction; Katipunan	Imus, Cavite: Commanded the division of Republican Army covering the areas of Navotas, Tambobong, Novaliches and Caloocan
67. Licerio Gerónimo	Major General: Superior chief of the second and third zones of Manila(1900); commanding general of the third military zone of Manila (1898) - appointed by General Antonio Luna; Katipunan Division General in charge of Morong; One of the commanders in Battle of Mount Puray (1897); One of the rebel assault soldiers in the siege of San Juan del Monte gunpowder magazine on August 30, 1896	Philippine Constabulary (June 1, 1902); First Philippine Republic; Katipunan	Sampaloc, Manila: Commanded the Third zone Division of the Republican army that covers the area of Montalban, San Mateo, and Marikina
68. Nicolas Godines	Commanding General-Katipunan General: One of the Commanding generals in the 4 Military Zones of Cebu (1899); Guerrilla General operating in Southern district of Cebu (1902); Insurgent General, post-Brigandage Act; Guerrilla General, post-capture of President Emilio Aguinaldo	*Federated States of Visayas: First Philippine Republic; Katipunan in Cebu	Cebu City, Cebu: Guerrilla campaigns against US forces in Dumanjug, Sibonga, and Tañon
69. Florencio Gonzales	Commanding General-Katipunan General: General-in-chief - appointed by General Gil Domingo and Teodoro Plata	Federated States of Visayas; First Philippine Republic; Katipunan in Cebu	Cebu City, Cebu
70. Nicolas Gonzales	Brigadier General	Republic of Katagalugan and Army of Liberation"- under General Miguel Malvar; First Philippine Republic	Tanauan, Batangas
71. Simon Gonzales	Commanding General-Philippine Republic: Also noted as Simeon Gonzales; Military Chief of Mindanao- appointed by General Emilio Aguinaldo (February 12, 1899)	Katipunan in Cebu; First Philippine Republic	Surigao (province): Military campaign and expeditionary operations in Agusan, Davao Oriental, and Camiguin
72. Wenceslao Gonzales	Commanding General-Philippine Republic: Military-Revolutionary Governor of Surigao, appointed by President Emilio Aguinaldo; Brother of General Simon (Simeon) Gonzales	Katipunan in Cebu; First Philippine Republic	Surigao (province): Military campaign and expeditionary operations in Agusan, Davao Oriental, and Camiguin
73. Claro Guevarra	Brigadier General: He succeeded General Vicente Lukban's post in Samar; Guerrilla General, post-capture of President Emilio Aguinaldo	First Philippine Republic	Samar
74. Adriano Hernandez	Commanding General-Philippine Republic: Guerrilla General, post-capture of President Emilio Aguinaldo	Federal States of the Visayas; First Philippine Republic; Ejército Libertador	Iloilo
75. Candido Iban	Commanding General-Katipunan General: Andres Bonifacio commissioned Candido Iban and Francisco del Castillo to lead the Katipunan movement in Aklan.; Candido Iban, along with brother Benito, was one of the "13 Martyrs of Aklan"	Katipunan in Manila; Katipunan in Aklan	Malinao, Aklan (Barangay Lilo-an)
76. Emilio Jacinto	Commanding General-Katipunan General: Chief of the Army North of Manila - Katipunan Army (after Nakpil); Nom de guerre and Katipunan alias- "Pingkian", "Dimasilaw", "Ka Ilyong"	Pro-Andrés Bonifacio	Tondo, Manila
78. Maximino Hizon	Commanding General-Katipunan General	First Philippine Republic; Katipunan	Mexico, Pampanga
79. Gregorio Mayo Katigbak	Commanding General-Philippine Republic: Also noted as Gregorio Mayo Catigbac	Katipunan in Lipa; First Philippine Republic; General Malvar's Tagalog Republic	Lipa, Batangas
80. Agueda Kahabagan	Brigadier General: "Henerala Agueda" was appointed and commissioned by General Miguel Malvar as the only woman in the roster of generals in the army of the First Philippine Republic	Republic of Katagalugan and Army of Liberation"- under General Miguel Malvar; First Philippine Republic	Laguna (province)
81. Aniceto Lacson	Commanding General-Philippine Republic: Military Governor of Negros	Republic of Negros; Federal States of Visayas; First Philippine Republic	Negros Island
82. Urbano Lacuna	Brigadier General	First Philippine Republic	Peñaranda, Nueva Ecija
83. Pascual V. Ledesma	Commanding General-Philippine Republic	First Philippine Republic; Katipunan,	Himamaylan, Negros Occidental
84. Vicente Leyva	Commanding General-Katipunan General	Katipunan-Magdiwang; Katipunan	Mandaluyong, Manila
85. Mariano Llanera	Lieutenant General: Commanding General-Philippine Republic; Commanding General-Katipunan General	First Philippine Republic; Hong Kong Junta; Republic of Biak-Na-Bato; Katipunan	Cabiao, Nueva Ecija
86. Ignacio Lopez	Commanding General-Philippine Republic: Commander – Visayan Revolutionary Forces	Republic of Negros; Revolutionary Republic of Visayas; First Philippine Republic	Negros Island
87. Roque Lopez	Commander-in-chief: President of the Council of State(Federal States of Visayas); President of "Estados Federal de Bisayas"; President of the Provisional Revolutionary Government of the District of Visayas (November 17, 1898)- appointed by General Emilio Aguinaldo	"Estados Federal de Bisayas" (Federal States of Visayas); Provisional Revolutionary Government of the District of Visayas; First Philippine Republic; Katipunan	Jaro, Iloilo City
88. Payat Lucino	Commanding General-Katipunan General	Magdiwang-Katipunan; Katipunan	?
89. Mateo Luga	Brigadier General: The only ethnic (Ibanag) Filipino revolutionary general; A general from Luzon in the Cebu revolutionary force	Cebu Revolutionary Government; First Philippine Republic; Katipunan in Bulacan	Paoay, Ilocos Norte: Tumauini, Isabela; Military campaigns in Balinta, Antipolo, Montalban, San Pedro de Makati, Palipanan, Monting Lupa, Kalo-okan
90. Justo Lukbán	Commanding General Expeditionary Forces in Visayas and Masbate	Pro-Emilio Aguinaldo; First Philippine Republic; Councilor to the Central Directorate of the Hong Kong Junta; Member of the Hong Kong Junta (Emilio Aguinaldo's Exile Government in Hong Kong) along with brother, Vicente Lukban (1897); Katipunan	Labo, Camarines Norte: Manila - 3rd Mayor (January 16, 1917 – March 6, 1920); Military campaigns in Masbate and Visayas
91. Vicente Lukbán	Lieutenant General: Comandante Militar -Visayas and Mindanao (1901); Comandante Militar -Civil Governor – Bicol Region, Leyte (took over after General Ambrosio Mojica's surrender on May 18, 1901 and Samar (1898–1901); Brigadier-General-Philippine Revolutionary Army (1898–1901)	Pro-Emilio Aguinaldo- Staff member of Aguinaldo's Government; First Philippine Republic; Member of the Hong Kong Junta (Emilio Aguinaldo's Exile Government in Hong Kong) along with brother, Justo Lukban (1897); Katipunan	Labo, Camarines Norte: Tayabas Province – Governor (1913–1916); Military campaigns in Samar and Leyte
92. Antonio Luna	Commander-in-chief-Captain General (Director of War, Malolos Republic): Lieutenant General-Commander-in-Chief of all the Filipino forces in Central Luzon (Bulacan, Tarlac, Pampanga, Nueva Ecija, Bataan, Zambales); (March 1, 1899)-appointment by General Emilio Aguinaldo: Founder of Academia Militar in Malolos, Bulacan (October 1898); Chief of War Operations-Brigadier General (September 26, 1898)	First Philippine Republic	Binondo, Manila
93. Elias Magbanua	Commanding General-Philippine Republic	Federated States of Visayas; First Philippine Republic; Katipunan in Visayas	Pototan, Iloilo
94. Pascual Magbanua	Commanding General-Philippine Republic	Federated States of Visayas; First Philippine Republic; Katipunan in Visayas	Pototan, Iloilo
95. Teresa Magbanua	Commanding General-Philippine Republic: Also known as "Nay Isa" and "The Joan of Arc of the Visayas"	Federated States of Visayas; First Philippine Republic; Katipunan in Visyas	Pototan, Iloilo
95. Francisco Makabulos	Commanding General-Philippine Republic: Also noted as Francisco Macabulos	First Philippine Republic; Pro-Emilio Aguinaldo; First Philippine Republic; Provisional Government of Central Luzon; Katipunan in Tarlac- inducted by Ladislao Diwa	La Paz, Tarlac
96. Luis Malinis	Commanding General-Katipunan General	Katipunan-Magdiwang; Katipunan	Polo, Valenzuela, Metro Manila
97. Miguel Malvar	Commander-in-chief-after capture of General Emilio Aguinaldo and surrender of General Mariano Trias: President of the Tagalog Republic after Emilio Aguinaldo's capture; Commanding General-"Army of Liberation" after capture of General Emilio Aguinaldo; Commanding General of Batangas Province; Commanding General-Philippine Republic - Southern Tagalog Army; Commanding General-Katipunan- Malvar Brigade- fought alongside General Edilberto Evangelista and General Paciano Rizal	First Philippine Republic; Philippine Revolutionary Government; Katipunan-Magdiwang; Katipunan in Batangas	Santo Tomas, Batangas: Last phases of war against US forces in provinces of Batangas, Laguna, Tayabas (Quezon Province); Military campaigns in Manila, Laguna, Batangas and Quezon provinces with the First Philippine Republic
98. Roman Manalang	Commander-in-chief: Presidente Generalisimo (President-General) and founder of Western Pangasinan Katipunan Council (November 18, 1897); Also noted as Roman Manalan, Roman Manolan; Commanding General-Katipunan General- Officers under his command were General Mauro Ortiz and Colonel Felipe Quintos; Post -Brigandage Act of 1902 General; Killed in 1903	First Philippine Republic; Katipunan-Western Pangasinan Katipunan Council	Castillejos, Zambales: Military campaigns in Western Pangasinan and Northern Zambales
99. Eleuterio Marasigan	Commanding General-Philippine Republic: Nom de guerre -“Heneral Teryo"; Commander of "Battalon Maluya"; Commanding General-Batangas Revolutionary under General Miguel Malvar; Commanding General- Revolutionary Expeditionary Forces in Tayabas	Magdiwang	Batangas
100. Marcela Marcelo	Commanding General-Katipunan General: "Selang Bagsik (Fierce Sela)" – nom de guerre; One of the leaders against the Spanish in "Battle of Pasong Santol"- killed in action	Katipunan in Malibay	Pasay (Barangay Malibay)
101. Guillermo Masangkay	Commanding General-Philippine Republic: Also noted as Guillermo Masangcay; Commanding General-Katipunan General; One of the Katipunan advisers of Andres Bonifacio; Present durinth the "Cry of Pugad Lawin"	Tagalog Republic; Katipunan	Tondo, Manila (Meisic): Parents are from Batangas and Cavite
102. Tomás Mascardo	Brigadier General: Chief of Revolutionary Intelligence Service in Manila; One of the commanders in the "Battle of Zapote Bridge" in 1897	First Philippine Republic; Republic of Biak-na-Bato; Katipunan (Magdalo)	Cavite del Viejo (Kawit, Cavite): Military campaigns in Tanauan, Batangas
103. Arcadio Maxilom	Commander-in-chief: Supreme commander Cebu Revolutionary forces after General Pantaleon Villegas; Commanding General-Philippine Republic; Commanding General-Katipunan General	Federated States of Visayas; Provincial Government of Cebu; First Philippine Republic; Katipunan in Cebu	Tuburan, Cebu
104. Norberto Mayo	Field guerrilla Commander (post-capture of President Emilio Aguinaldo): Commander of Tiaong-Candelaria Guerrilla Column-Banahaw Battalion of General Miguel Malvar's Tagalog Republic; "de facto general" when General Miguel Malvar surrendered on April 13, 1902; Lt. Colonel - First Philippine Republic	"Army of Liberation" of General Miguel Malvar; Tagalog Republic of General Miguel Malvar; First Philippine Republic; Revolutionary Government of the Philippines; Katipunan in Batangas	Tiaong, Quezon (formerly Tayabas Province): Guerrilla campaign against US forces in Candelaria (formerly Tayabas Province) and Lipa, Batangas
105. Raymundo Melliza	Commanding General-Philippine Republic: Second President of Federal States of the Visayas (January 17, 1899) after General Roque Lopez	Federal State of the Visayas; Cebu Revolutionary Government; First Philippine Republic	Molo, Iloilo City
106. Alejo Miñosa	Commanding General-Katipunan General: Cebuano general and hero who helped General Leon Kilat in battle against Spanish rule in Cebu	First Philippine Republic; Federated States of Visayas; Revolutionary Provisional Government in Cebu; Katipunan in Cebu	Cebu City,
107. Ambrosio Mojica	Brigadier General: Also noted as Ambrosio Moxica; Capitan Municipal of Indang, Cavite; Military Governor of Leyte	First Philippine Republic; Commander of the Leyte Forces of the First Philippine Republic prior to General Lucban taking over the post; Employed shock guerilla tactics against the American forces using auxiliary religious revolutionary troops-"Pulahanes" and "Dios-dios" fanatics	Indang, Cavite - in Barrio Buna: Military campaigns in Leyte
108. Diego Mojica	Commanding General-Katipunan General: Magdiwang Council-Minister of Finance	First Philippine Republic; Katipunan-Magdiwang	San Francisco de Malabon (General Trias)
109. Julian Montalan	Lieutenant-General	Tagalog Republic under Macario Sakay; Tagalog Republic under Miguel Malvar; Tagalog Republic under Andres Bonifacio; First Philippine Republic; Katipunan	Cavite: Guerilla campaigns in Laguna and Batangas
110. Antonio Montenegro	Commanding General-Philippine Republic: Governor of the Province of Manila - Central Government of Luzon	First Philippine Republic; Hong Kong Junta; Katpunan-Magdalo	Cavite
111. Gregoria Montoya	Brigadier General (posthumous): Killed in action along with generals Crispulo Aguinaldo, Candido Tirona and Simeon Latorre in the Battle of Binakayan	Katipunan; Magdalo	Cavite
112. Domingo Moriones	Guerrilla General, post-capture of President Emilio Aguinaldo: Secretary of War-Tagalog Republic	Tagalog Republic under Macario Sakay; First Philippine Republic; Revolutionary Government of the Philippines; Katipunan	Cavite: Batangas, Laguna, Rizal provinces - military and government base of Tagalog Republic
113. Julio Nakpil	Commanding General-Katipunan General: Chief of the Army North of Manila - Katipunan Army (before General Emilio Jacinto)	Tagalog Republic; Katipunan	Manila
114. Benito Natividad	Brigadier General	*First Philippine Republic	Nueva Ecija
115. Mamerto Natividad	Lieutenant General: Brigadier General	Katipunan (Magdalo)	Nueva Ecija
116. Salvador Natividad	Brigadier General	*First Philippine Republic	Nueva Ecija
117. Cenon Nicolas	Brigadier General	Katipunan-Jocson; Philippine Revolutionary Government; Katipunan	Manila: Military campaigns in Morong (Rizal) Province and Bulacan Province
118. Santos Nocon	Brigadier General: Also notes as "No-con"	First Philippine Republic; Revolutionary Government of the Philippines; Katipunan-Magdiwang; Katipunan	Cavite
119. Mariano Noriel	Brigadier General	First Philippine Republic; Katipunan	Bacoor, Cavite
120. Simeón Ola	Brigadier General	First Philippine Republic	Guinobatan, Albay
121. Mauro Ortiz	Commanding General-Katipunan General: Commanding Generals in Zambales and Pangasinan	First Philippine Republic; Katipunan	Alaminos, Pangasinan: Military campaigns in Northern Zambales
122. Aniceto Oruga	Insurgent General: Guerrilla commander Batangas-Laguna zones; Brigadier General under the "Tagalog Republic" of Macario Sakay; Commander of guerrilla unit operating along Batangas Province's lake towns; Commander of "Army of Liberation" of General Miguel Malvar; Southern Tagalog-Batangas Revolutionary Army	Insurgent General - Post- Brigandage Act of November 12, 1902; Repúbliká ng̃ Katagalugan - Tagalog Republic (Macario Sakay); Republic of Katagalugan and Army of Liberation"- under General Miguel Malvar; First Philippine Republic	Lipa, Batangas
123. Andres Pacheco	Division General: Katipunan General	First Philippine Republic; Katipunan	Bulacan
124. Cipriano Pacheco	Commanding General-Katipunan General: "Hininga" (Breath) – Katipunan nom de guerre; Head of the section "Pagtibain" of the Katipunan branch "Katagalugan" (Tondo); Secretary of War-Mount Puray Agreement-Departmental Government of Central Luzon (1897)	First Philippine Republic; Magdiwang (Katipunan faction); Katipunan-Katagalugan branch	Tondo, Manila
125. Enrique Pacheco	Commanding General-Katipunan General: Secretary of Finance of Republic of Katalugan (July 1896); Sons Alfonso and Cipriano were also officers of the Revolutionary Government	First Philippine Republic; Magdiwang Council; Katipunan – "Katagalugan" Council	Tondo, Manila: Present during the Cry of Pugadlawin in Caloocan
126. Timoteo Pasay	Field guerrilla Commander (Katipunan): One of the Capitan Municipal (Mayor) of Morong (Rizal) province	First Philippine Republic; Katipunan	Rizal Province (Morong): Military skirmishes against US forces in municipalities of Cainta and Bacoor
127. Jose Ignacio Paua	Brigadier General: Also noted as Jose Ignacio Pawa; Full-blooded Chinese general in revolutionary rank	First Philippine Republic; Katipunan-Magdalo	Fujian, China
128. Perfecto Poblador	Commanding General-Philippine Republic	Federal States of Visayas; First Philippine Republic	Iloilo
129. Isidro Pompac	Colorum General-Religious and Agrarian insurrection: Also known as Commander "Otoy" of the guerrilla forces in Samar and Leyte islands; One of the leaders of "Pulahan" religious-auxiliary brigade and "Babaylan" revolutionaries; Considered as a Colorum leader; Post -Brigandage Act of 1902 Commander; Killed in action in Cancoyao on October 1, 1911 by Lt Leon Puno of the Philippine Constabulary	Katipunan; Dios-Dios religious sect	Leyte: Samar
130. Nicolas Portilla	Brigadier General: Along with generals Artemio Ricarte and Diego Mojica, he was one of the three Revolutionary leaders of Battle of San Francisco de Malabon	Katipunan-Magdiwang; First Philippine Republic	Cavite
131. Pedro Quipte	Colorum General-Religious and Agrarian insurrection "Pulahan" Commanding General in Masbate	Pulahan (Red); Colorum forces commander who helped in the Siege of Masbate	Cataingan, Masbate
132. Bernabe Reyes	Commanding General-Philippine Republic: General-Military Governor of the Provisional Revolutionary Government in Bohol (appointed by General Emilio Aguinaldo on January 16, 1899)	First Philippine Republic; Federal States Of Visayas; Republic of Negros; Republic of Bohol	Cavite: Resided in Bohol
133. Artemio Ricarte	Lieutenant General (Captain General from 1897 to 1898): Nom de guerre- "Vibora" (Viper)	First Philippine Republic; Katipunan Magdiwang (Mapagtiis)	Batac, Ilocos Norte
134. Emiliano Riego De Dios	Commanding General-Katipunan General: Magdiwang Council-Secretary of Welfare	First Philippine Republic; Magdiwang; Katipunan	Maragondon, Cavite
135. Mariano Riego De Dios	Brigadier General	First Philippine Republic; Magdiwang; Katipunan	Maragondon, Cavite
136. Ruperto Rios; alternatively, Reos	General, Religious Auxiliary: Viceroy-General; "Colorum" Commander	Katipunan; First Philippine Republic; Auxiliary Brigade supporting General Miguel Malvar and Lt. Col. Emilio Zurbano (Military Governor of Tayabas) – "Army of Liberation" guerrilla campaign; Post -Brigandage Act of 1902 General taking over Lt. Col. Emiliano Zurbano's guerilla command in Tayabas	Tayabas, Quezon
137. Fermin Rivas	Commanding General-Philippine Republic: Commanding General Visayan Central Zone - appointed during revolutionary assembly to create a provisional Visayan Revolutionary Government (Santa Barbara, Iloilo, 1898)	Federal States of Visayas; First Philippine Republic; Katipunan in the Visayas; Ilonggo Revolutionary leader	Iloilo
138. Paciano Rizal	Brigadier General	First Philippine Republic	Calamba, Laguna
139. Eusebio Roque	Commanding General-Katipunan General: General, Religious Auxiliary; "Dimabunggo" - Katipunan nom-de-guerre; Folk religious leader - reported to have 10,000 followers (men, women, and children) encamped in support of revolution in Kakarong; Former schoolmaster	Republic of Kakarong Sili; Supported by General Mariano Alvarez and the Magdiwang Council; Katipunan (Balangay Dimas-Alang)	Bulacan
140. Macario Sakay	Commander-in-chief: President of Tagalog Republic; Insurgent General, post-Brigandage Act; Founders of the Partido Nacionalista; Commanding General-Katipunan General	Tagalog Republic; Katipunan	Tondo, Manila
141. Apolonio Samson	Commanding General-Katipunan General: One of the leaders present in the Cry of Pugad Lawin; Head of Katipunan in Caloocan	Section Commander-Guerrilla Troops of General Luciano San Miguel; First Philippine Republic; Katipunan in Caloocan; Magdiwang	Caloocan, Manila
142. Teodoro Sandiko	Brigadier General: Also noted as Teodoro Sandico	First Philippine Republic; Revolutionary Government of the Philippines; Katipunan	Pandacan, Manila
143. Luciano San Miguel	Commander-in-Chief-Captain General: Chief of all Troops; Supreme commander of the remaining revolutionary forces (1902); Brigadier General; Commander of the rebel lines in San Francisco de Malabon	First Philippine Republic; Tagalog Republic; Katipunan	Noveleta, Cavite: March 27, 1903 – Killed in action during the "Battle of Corral-na-Bato" in Morong (now Rizal)
144. Benito Santa Ana	Guerrilla General, post-capture of President Emilio Aguinaldo: Field guerrilla Commander (Katipunan) under General Luciano San Miguel; Post -Brigandage Act of 1902 General	Katipunan; First Philippine Republic; Tagalog Republic	Central Luzon campaigns: Western Luzon campaigns
145. Julian Santos	Commanding General-Katipunan General: Assassinated by order of Feliciano Jocson (Katipunan-Jocson Faction)	First Philippine Republic; Tagalog Republic; Katipunan	Marikina: Guerrilla campaign in Bulacan and Rizal provinces
146. Sinforoso San Pedro	Brigadier General	Pro-Andrés Bonifacio	Manila
147. Pedro Sason	Commanding General-Katipunan General: General "Consejero" -War Counselor	Katipunan	Bulacan
148. Gavino Sepulveda	Commanding General-Philippine Republic: Also noted as Gabino Sepulveda	Federal State of the Visayas; First Philippine Republic	Cebu: Bohol
149. Gregorio Tapalla	Commanding General-Katipunan General: Also known as "Matandang Leon" (Old Lion) or "Laong"; Former bandit turn revolutionary- appointed by Andres Bonifacio; Killed in action in "Pasong Tamo" skirmish (August 26, 1896)	Katipunan; Pro-Andres Bonifacio	San Francisco de Malabon (General Trias)
150. Pablo Tecson	Brigadier General	First Philippine Republic; Pro-Emilio Aguinaldo; Katipunan	Bulacan
151. Trinidad Tecson	Commanding General-Philippine Republic	First Philippine Republic; Pro-Emilio Aguinaldo; Katipunan	Bulacan
152. Saturnino Echavez Teves	Commanding General-Katipunan General	First Philippine Republic; Federal State of the Visayas	Dumaguete, Negros Oriental: Campaigns in Negros Oriental and Cebu
153. Manuel Tinio	Brigadier General: Commander of "The Tinio Brigade"	First Philippine Republic; Pro-Emilio Aguinaldo; Katipunan	Nueva Ecija: Campaigns in Ilocos Norte Region
154. Candido Tirona	Major General: One of the Commanding generals in the Battle of Binakayan (November 9–11, 1896)	Katipunan (Magdalo)	Kawit, Cavite
155. Daniel Tirona	Brigadier General	First Philippine Republic; Katipunan (Magdalo)	Kawit, Cavite
155. Lazaro Toledo	Insurgent General: Post-Brigandage Act of 1902 Brigadier General – took over after General Simeon Ola's surrender (September 25, 1903); Colonel under General Simeon Ola's guerrilla brigade; Officer under General Vito Belarmino's Command in the Bicol Region	First Philippine Republic; Katipunan in Bicol	Bicol Region
156. Licerio Topacio	Commanding General-Katipunan General: Eldest delegate at age 58 in the Tejeros Convention representing the Magdalo Faction; Municipal President of Imus during the American government in the Philippines	First Philippine Republic; Katipunan-Magdalo; Katipunan	Imus, Cavite
157. Isidoro Torres	Brigadier General: Also noted as "Isidro"; Katipunan code name and nom de guerre "Matang Lawin" (Hawkeye)	First Philippine Republic; Philippine Revolutionary Government; Republic of Kakarong Sili; Katipunan in Bulacan	Bulacan
159. Mariano Trías	Lieutenant General	First Philippine Republic; Magdiwang to Magdalo	San Francisco de Malabon, Cavite - present day (General Trias)
160. Pío Valenzuela	General, Chief of Medicine and Health: Commanding General-Katipunan General; Close friend and adviser of Andres Bonifacio	First Philippine Republic; Katipunan-Magdiwang; Pro-Andrés Bonifacio; Katipunan	Polo, Bulacan - present day(Valenzuela, Metro Manila)
161. Pantaleón Valmonte	Brigadier General: Also noted as Pantaleón Belmonte	Neutral	Nueva Ecija
162. Miguel Valmoria	Brigadier General	*First Philippine Republic: Katipunan	Bohol
163. Emilio Verdeflor	Brigadier General: Colonel under General Arcadio Maxilom; Katipunan Lieutenant	Katipunan in Cebu; Revolutionary Republic of Cebu; First Philippine Republic	Cebu: Insurgent campaigns in Cebu- Tuburan and Balamban
164. Pantaleon Villegas	Commanding General-Katipunan General: His nom de guerre was "Leon Kilat" (Lightning Lion); Assassinated on Good Friday, April 8, 1898, in Carcar, Cebu by his own aide-de-camp, Apolinario Alcuitas	Katipunan; First Philippine Republic	Bacong, Negros Oriental: Cebu
165. Wenceslao Viniegra	Brigadier General: Military Governor of Zambales and, later, of Camarines; Colonel of First Philippine Republic; Captain of Revolutionary Army	First Philippine Republic; Revolutionary Government of the Philippines; Katipunan	San Francisco de Malabon(General Trias)
166. Flaviano Yengko	Brigadier General	Katipunan (Magdalo)	Manila

== Table Legend ==
1. Grade here refers to military, organizational, or leadership rank with regards to the Katipunan movement, governments of First Philippine Republic, and regional Federated states and provincial republics. Second, it also includes guerrilla-structured Post-Republic campaign during the Philippine–American War that includes "de facto" leadership, guerrilla leadership, "cacique" or chieftain leadership. Third, leaders who are categorized as part of "bandolerisimo" leadership after Brigandage Act of November 12, 1902 (American-influenced Philippine legislature changed status of all Philippine Revolutionary Republican soldiers from enemy insurgent to "ladrones", "bandoleros" or "tulisanes" (bandits and outlaws), effectively criminalizing all resistance activities or revolts) are also described in this section. Fourth, Kolorum (Colorum) leaders and "generals" who heads religious and fanatic based rebel groups are also noted in this section.
1. Affiliation here refers to support of political fractions or individuals in the Katipunan movement, government of First Philippine Republic, or guerrilla-structured Post-Republic campaign during the Philippine–American War.
1. Province here refers to provinces or regions within the individual's areas of operational responsibilities.

== Addendum ==
The Philippine American War or "Philippine Insurrection" has two phases. First phase was the conventional military warfare between two organized armies: The US Forces and the First Philippine Republican Army. This was period was from February to November 1899. The second phase started from November 1899 when the Revolutionary army was dissipated into "guerrilla" -style warfare. This was based on smaller organized units of soldiers and local civilian supporters. Leadership became arbitrary with succession of "generals" and "commanders" based on who was second in command from the hierarchy of the old republic or who has more supporters or people under one's command. The remnants of the First Philippine Republic continued the struggle for independence into local regional and provincial levels as late as 1915.
