= Binakayan Bridge =

Road bridge in Cavite, Philippines

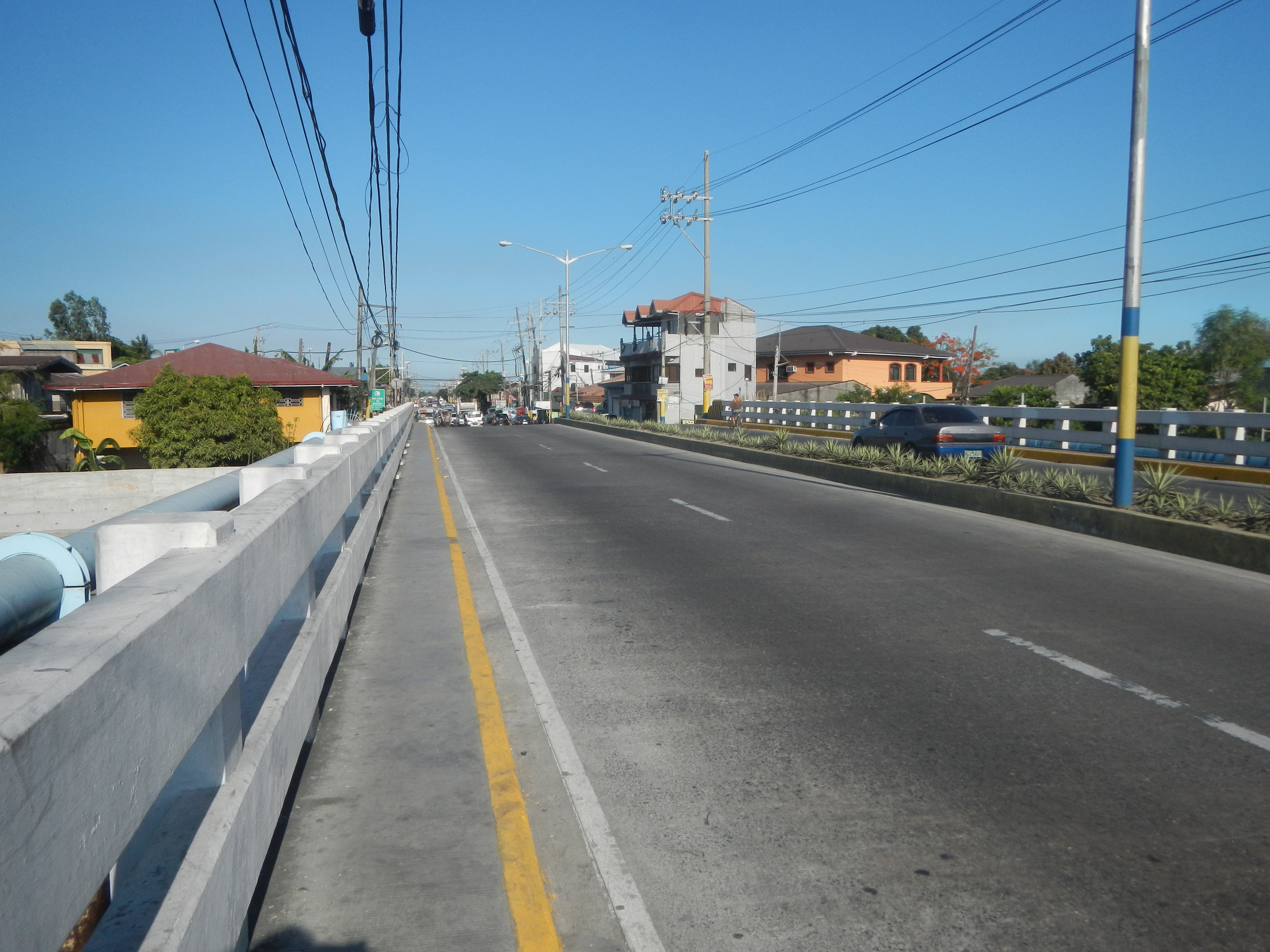
- View of Binakayan Bridge from Kawit
- Coordinates: 14°27′2.07″N 120°55′39.72″E
- Carries: Carries northbound and southbound vehicles and pedestrians over the Imus River
- Crosses: Imus River
- Locale: Boundary of Kawit and Bacoor, Cavite, Philippines
- Other name: Abubot Bridge
- Maintained by: Department of Public Works and Highways (DPWH)

Characteristics
- Design: Concrete girder bridge
- Material: Concrete (formerly timber/wood)

Statistics
- Toll: Free (Toll abolished in 1951)

Location
- Interactive map of Binakayan Bridge

The Binakayan Bridge, historically known as the Abubot Bridge, is a permanent concrete road bridge spanning the Imus River located along the Tirona Highway in the boundaries of Bacoor City and Kawit, Cavite, Philippines.

The bridge serves as a major crossing connecting the town of Kawit with neighboring city of Bacoor.

== History ==
=== Early wooden structure ===
During the Philippine Revolution in the 19th century, the crossing connecting the towns of Cavite el Viejo (now Kawit) and Bacoor was initially constructed as a 3-span wooden truss bridge resting on two concrete abutments and two pile bents, spanning the Imus River. Formerly known as the Abubot Bridge, it was maintained and periodically rebuilt by the Bureau of Public Works due to damage from seasonal flooding and wear. Reconstruction work was done during the 1920s under the Insular Government of the Philippine Islands to convert it to 10-meter reinforced concrete deck girder bridge by adding three additional bents between the existing bents and abutments.

=== Toll operation and post-war conversion ===
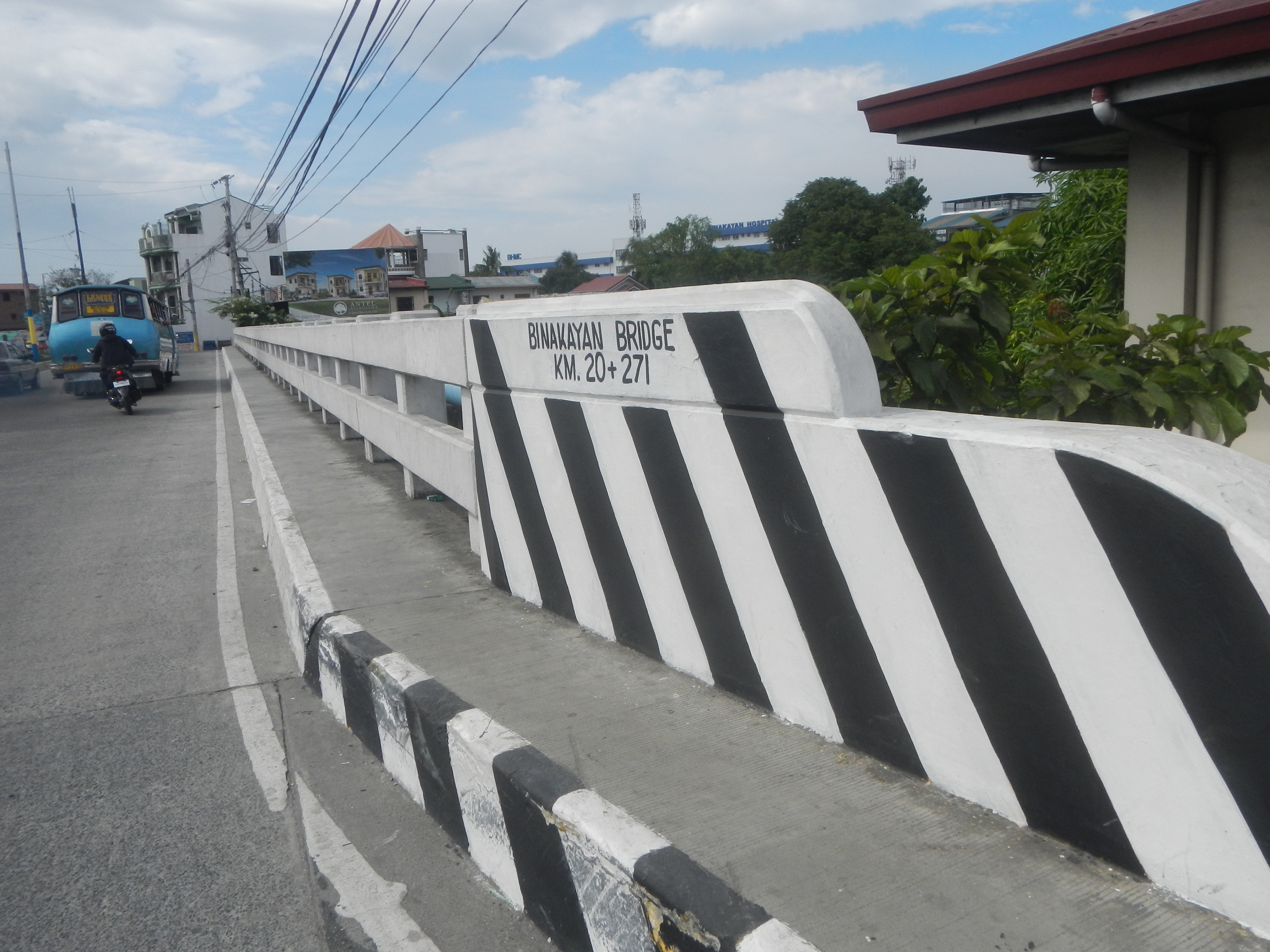
The bridge's identification marker

For several decades during the early-to-mid 20th century, the crossing operated as a toll bridge to fund its ongoing repair and upkeep. On October 25, 1951, President Elpidio Quirino signed Executive Order No. 481, s. 1951, officially terminating the collection of tolls on the Binakayan Bridge after the original construction costs were fully recouped by the Philippine government.

The wooden structure was subsequently replaced by a modern concrete girder bridge.

== During the Philippine Revolution ==
During the Philippine Revolution, the area around Binakayan Bridge was a key battleground. Between November 9 and 11, 1896, it served as one of the key defensive gateways during the Battle of Binakayan–Dalahican.

On November 10, a woman named Gregoria "Gloria" P. Montoya joined Aguinaldo's forces while defending the fortification. Although Aguinaldo requested her to leave for safety, she refused, intending to avenge the death of her Katipunero husband who was killed a day earlier during the battle in Dalahican. To assist the defense, Aguinaldo placed several units under her command to delay Spanish reinforcements marching from Bacoor—part of an 8,000-strong contingent of Iberian and Cuban troops previously stationed in Las Piñas and Parañaque. Montoya's most notable contribution was single-handedly dismantling the wooden bridge (now Binakayan Bridge) across the Imus River in Mabolo, Bacoor, which connected Bacoor to Cavite Viejo (now Kawit). Her action successfully delayed Spanish reinforcements advancing toward Binakayan, though it ultimately cost her life.
