= Licerio Topacio =

General Licerio Topacio (1839–1925) was a leader in the Philippine independence movement.

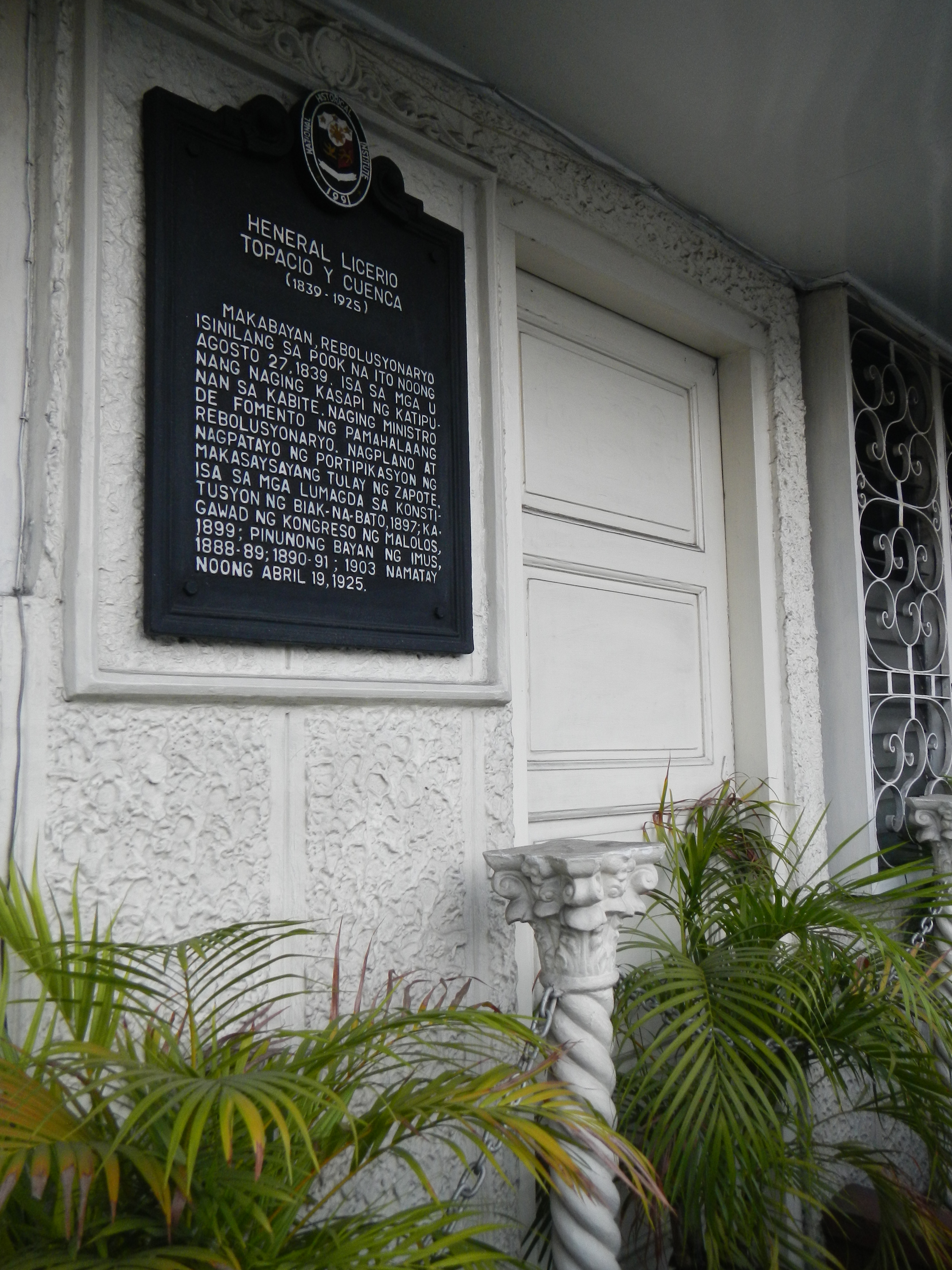
House at Imus, Cavite

Born in Imus, Cavite, on August 27, 1839, to Miguel Topacio, a former gobernadorcillo, and Marta Cuenca, Topacio finished his studies in Imus. He was not able to pursue higher education in Manila.

Because of the ongoing Lachambre offensive in Magdalo territory, only eight Magdalo leaders were able to attend the Tejeros Convention on March 22, 1897. They were Baldomero Aguinaldo, Daniel Tria Tirona, Felix Cuenca, Cayetano Topacio, Crispulo Aguinaldo, Antonio Montenegro, and an unidentified Magdalo leader. Except for Montenegro and this unidentified leader, they were all members of the Magdalo Council or Government. Licerio Topacio was the eldest of the Magdalo leaders present at the age of 58. In deference to his age, he must have been considered by the group for nomination as president of the Revolutionary Government to be established. But he declined because he was too old and that the presidency needed a younger, stronger man. The next choice was Emilio Aguinaldo, who was absent, defending the strategic Pasong Santol in Dasmariñas against repeated assaults by Lachambre's troops. Aguinaldo was elected president of the revolutionary government in absentia.

After the Battle of Imus (September 3, 1896) and the Battle of Binakayan (November 9–11), Aguinaldo’s prestige as a military leader had risen. Aguinaldo later won the majority votes in the Magdiwang-dominated Tejeros Convention.

Had Licerio Topacio, instead of Aguinaldo, been nominated in the Tejeros Convention, he may have been decisively beaten by Andres Bonifacio, the Katipunan Supremo.

There are alternative views about the reasons he did not become head of the movement. One biographer, Sol H. Gwekoh, says that had Topacio not given way to a young man, Emilio Aguinaldo, he would have been the leader of the Philippine Revolution. Another biographer, Benjamin M. Bolivar, claims that Topacio “declined the honor” when Aguinaldo offered him the leadership of the revolution.

After the Philippine–American War Topacio was twice appointed as municipal president of Imus. He died on April 19, 1925, at the age of 86.
