= Salvador Estrella =

Filipino general

- Born: August 20, 1856; Malolos, Bulacan, Spanish Philippines
- Died: October 19, 1932 (aged 76); Malolos, Bulacan, Philippine Islands
- Military career
- Allegiance: First Philippine Republic
- Branch: Philippine Revolutionary Army
- Service years: 1896–1900
- Rank: Brigadier General
- Nickname: "Red blooded"
- Conflicts: Philippine Revolution: Perez Dasmariñas; Naic; Alapan; Philippine–American War: San Roque; Guadalupe

Salvador Estrella (20 August 1856 – 19 October 1932) was a Filipino general who fought in the Philippine Revolution and the Philippine–American War. For his courage in battle, he earned the moniker "red blooded."

== Early life and career ==
Little is known about Estrella's early life and career: he was born in Malolos, Bulacan in 1856; three years later, on 31 August 1859, the town of Malolos was divided into three independent towns: Malolos, Barasoain and Santa Isabel. Estrella hailed from Santa Isabel.

== Military career ==
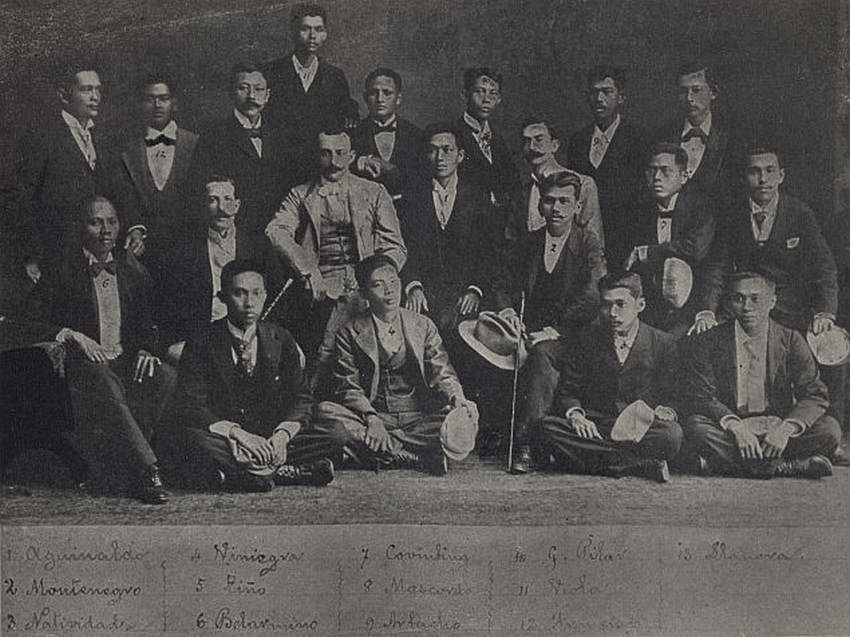
Filipino revolutionaries exiled to Hong Kong. Estrella is in the back row, flanked by Isabelo Artacho, Antonio Montenegro, Gregorio del Pilar, and Isidro Torres.

When the Philippine Revolution broke out in 1896, Estrella was serving in the native contingent of the Spanish colonial armed forces. Soon enough, he was among the native officers who deserted the colonial armed forces and joined the revolutionaries. By 1897, he has distinguished himself in the battles at Perez Dasmariñas and Naic. For his courage in these battles, he received the moniker red blooded from his fellow revolutionaries. This was the time when Governor General Camilo García de Polavieja renewed the Spanish offensive in Cavite, with his deputy José de Lachambre leading on the front line. Due to the overwhelming gains of the Spanish, Emilio Aguinaldo was forced to relocate his headquarters from Talisay, Batangas to Biak-na-Bato in San Miguel, Bulacan. On 15 November 1897, the provisional constitution for the Biak-na-Bato Republic was ratified, with Estrella as one of the signers. With the Spanish seeking a quick resolution to the war, the Pact of Biak-na-Bato was signed on 14 December 1897 by Spanish Governor-General Fernando Primo de Rivera and the Republic of Biak-na-Bato President Emilio Aguinaldo. Aguinaldo and his fellow revolutionaries were given amnesty and monetary indemnity by the Spanish Government, in return for which the revolutionary government would go into exile in Hong Kong (later known as the Hong Kong Junta). Aguinaldo had decided to use the money to purchase advance firearms and ammunition later on return to the archipelago. Among those who were exiled was Estrella.

On 19 May 1898, Aguinaldo decided to resume the revolution and returned to the Philippines through American aid. Among those who returned with him was Estrella. When the Philippine–American War broke out on 4 February 1899, Estrella was one of the first generals to see action outside Manila. On 5 February, the Americans positioned themselves in the outskirts of San Roque (now part of Cavite City), which Filipino troops are being commanded by Estrella. Three days later, on 8 February, Second Lieutenant John Glass of the 1st Battalion of the California Heavy Artillery (California National Guard) was sent with an escort to demand Estrella the surrender and the evacuation of the town. Otherwise, artillery and gunboat bombardment would be done against them. By this time, the gunboats Manila and Callao have been positioned just outside the town to assist the offensive. On 9 February, the town mayor approached Commodore George Dewey to ask for more time to decide the matter. When Dewey refused, the Filipinos raised the white flag of surrender. However, this was only a deception to lure the Americans into attacking the town. When the Americans managed to occupy San Roque, the retreating Filipinos set the town on fire. In order to gain access to the area, the Americans had to flank it from the sea. Meanwhile, skirmishes were undertaken whenever the Americans caught up with the Filipinos. Estrella would continue leading Filipino troops for the rest of the year, even fighting alongside Brigadier General Pío del Pilar in Guadalupe, Makati (then part of Rizal). However, on 8 June 1900, Estrella was caught with Pío del Pilar by the American secret police (which utilized a native contingent headed by Captain Lara) at Guadalupe.

== Later life and death ==
Estrella died in his hometown of Malolos, Bulacan on 19 October 1932, aged 76.
