= Daniel Tirona =

Filipino politician (1864–1939)

Daniel Tría Tirona

Member of the Malolos Congress from Batanes
- In office September 15, 1898 – November 13, 1899 Serving with Vito Belarmino

Military Governor of Cagayan and Isabela
- In office 1898–1898

Personal details
- Born: Daniel Tría Tirona y Mata; July 22, 1864 Cavite El Viejo, Cavite, Captaincy General of the Philippines
- Died: September 2, 1939 (aged 75) Manila, Philippine Commonwealth
- Relations: Candido Tirona (brother)
- Education: Colegio de San Juan de Letran, (Bachelor of Arts)

Military service
- Allegiance: First Philippine Republic; Republic of Biak-na-Bato; Katipunan (Magdalo)
- Branch/service: Philippine Revolutionary Army
- Years of service: 1897–1900
- Rank: Brigadier General
- Battles/wars: Philippine Revolution; Philippine–American War

Daniel Tría Tirona y Mata (July 22, 1864 — September 2, 1939) was a Filipino politician. He became infamous for causing divisions within the Philippine revolutionary movement and for insulting and maligning Andres Bonifacio during the Tejeros Convention in 1897.

== Biography ==
=== Early life ===
Tirona was born in the town of Cavite el Viejo (i.e., Kawit) in Cavite. He had an elder brother, Candido Tirona. He was married four times, widowed thrice and had three children. He worked as a schoolteacher. He obtained a Bachelor of Arts degree from the Colegio de San Juan de Letran and studied law in the University of Santo Tomas.

=== Katipunan ===
He and his elder brother Candido were members of the Katipunan, a secret society founded in 1892 by Andrés Bonifacio and others. The Katipunan sought independence from Spain through armed revolt. The Tironas were leading members of the Magdalo, one of two chapters of the Katipunan in Cavite, the other being the Magdiwang. They were close associates of Emilio Aguinaldo, mayor of Cavite el Viejo and the most prominent Magdalo leader.

=== Military career ===
After the outbreak of the Philippine Revolution in the last days of August 1896, Tirona ceased his law studies. With several provinces in open revolt, the rebels of Cavite enjoyed the most success and they controlled virtually the entire province by September–October 1896.

After the Spanish forces retook Imus, Cavite on March 25, Governor-General Camilo de Polavieja offered amnesty to surrendering rebels. Tirona took advantage of the amnesty offer.

However, Tirona returned to Aguinaldo sometime later. Aguinaldo had been exiled to Hong Kong in December 1897 in accordance with the Pact of Biak-na-Bato which officially ended the revolution. In May 1898, the Philippines was embroiled in the Spanish–American War. Aguinaldo returned to the Philippines and officially resumed the revolution as an unofficial ally to the United States. Tirona was a witness and signatory of the Philippine Declaration of Independence on June 12. Commissioned as a colonel, Tirona headed a military expedition sent by Aguinaldo to Cagayan in August. He was subsequently appointed military governor of Cagayan and Isabela and held the rank of brigadier-general. Tirona represented the province of Batanes in the Malolos Congress in 1898-1899. The Philippine–American War broke out in February 1899 and Tirona and his troops were in Cagayan.

"Having the best and well equipped troops among Aguinaldo's forces, he surrendered in January 1900 without firing a single shot."

It was reported to Aguinaldo that Tirona became the servant of the American officer to whom he had surrendered for a time, cleaning his shoes and serving his meals.

=== Later life ===
Tirona supported the American colonial government after Aguinaldo's capture in March 1901. He was one of the representatives of Cavite el Viejo that met with the Taft Commission during their visit to Cavite on June 6. In the same year he held the position of provincial secretary of Cavite. He afterward served as provincial assessor and treasurer of Tarlac.

Tirona lived to see the establishment of the Commonwealth of the Philippines in 1935. He died in 1939 just before the start of World War II.

== Controversy ==
As the revolution progressed, the Magdalo and Magdiwang clashed over authority and jurisdiction and did not help each other in the face of Spanish counterattacks. Bonifacio was called to Cavite as the Supremo (supreme leader) or Presidente Supremo (Supreme President) of the Katipunan to mediate between the factions and unify their efforts. Meanwhile, Tirona's brother Candido was killed in battle on November 10 and he succeeded him as Magdalo secretary of war four days later. When Bonifacio arrived in Cavite in late November, Tirona was part of the welcoming party.

Within Cavite, friction grew between Bonifacio and the Magdalo leaders. Earlier in October, Aguinaldo had issued a manifesto in the name of the Magdalo ruling council which proclaimed an insurgent government. This was done despite the existence of the Katipunan, which Bonifacio had already converted into an insurgent government with him as president just before the outbreak of hostilities. Once Bonifacio was in Cavite the Magdalo leaders made overtures about replacing the Katipunan with an insurgent government of their design. Bonifacio and the Magdiwang maintained they already had a government in the Katipunan.

After Bonifacio was acclaimed as the "ruler of the Philippines" by townsfolk, unflattering rumors about him began to spread. It was rumored that Bonifacio had stolen Katipunan funds, his sister was the mistress of a priest, and he was an agent provocateur paid by Spanish friars to foment unrest. Also circulated were anonymous letters which told the people of Cavite not to idolize Bonifacio because he was (allegedly) a Freemason, a mere warehouseman, an atheist, and uneducated. These letters also said Bonifacio did not deserve the title of Supremo since only God was supreme. Tirona was widely suspected to be responsible for the rumor-mongering. When confronted by Bonifacio, Tirona dismissed his accusations in such a manner that provoked him to anger. He drew a gun and would have shot Tirona if others had not intervened.

Tirona was present at the Tejeros Convention on March 22, 1897, wherein Bonifacio and leaders of the Magdalo and Magdiwang met to settle the issue of leadership of the revolution. Bonifacio presided over the elections that followed, despite his misgivings over the lack of representation by other provinces. Tirona helped distribute the ballots. Emilio Aguinaldo was elected President in absentia while Bonifacio was elected Director of the Interior. Tirona loudly protested Bonifacio's election to Director of the Interior because he lacked a lawyer's diploma (the implicit message being that he lacked the education for the position). Tirona repeatedly suggested a prominent Cavite lawyer, José del Rosario, for the position. Since it had been agreed beforehand to respect the election results, Bonifacio demanded an apology. Instead, Tirona made to leave the assembly room. Angered, Bonifacio again drew his gun and was again restrained from shooting Tirona. Bonifacio invoked his position as chairman of the convention and leader of the Katipunan to declare the proceedings null and void. In the following days, Bonifacio refused to recognize Aguinaldo's government and alleged the elections were fraudulent. This allegation is supported by the revolutionaries Santiago Álvarez, Gregoria de Jesús and Guillermo Masangkay. Bonifacio was eventually arrested, tried and executed for treason by Aguinaldo's government.

== In popular culture ==
Tirona was portrayed in various films which featured or centered on the Philippine Revolution. He was portrayed by the following actors in these films:

- 2012 - Don Umali in El Presidente
- 2014 - Lawrence Roxas in Bonifacio: Ang Unang Pangulo

== Legacy ==
The Tirona Highway in Cavite is named after him.
