= Candido Tirona =

Filipino revolutionary leader

- Born: Candido Tría Tirona y Mata; August 29, 1863; Kawit, Cavite, Captaincy General of the Philippines
- Died: November 10, 1896 (aged 33); Northern Cavite, Spanish East Indies (now Philippines)
- Spouse: Macaria Majaba Geronimo
- Relatives: Daniel Tirona (brother)
- Military career
- Allegiance: Katipunan (Magdalo)
- Conflicts: Philippine Revolution: Kawit Revolt; Battle of Imus; Battle of Binakayan-Dalahican

Candido Tría Tirona y Mata (August 29, 1863 – November 10, 1896) was a Filipino revolutionary leader who participated and died in the Battle of Binakayan-Dalahican during the Philippine Revolution. He was a secretary of war in Magdalo chapter of the Katipunan and a close friend of Emilio Aguinaldo.

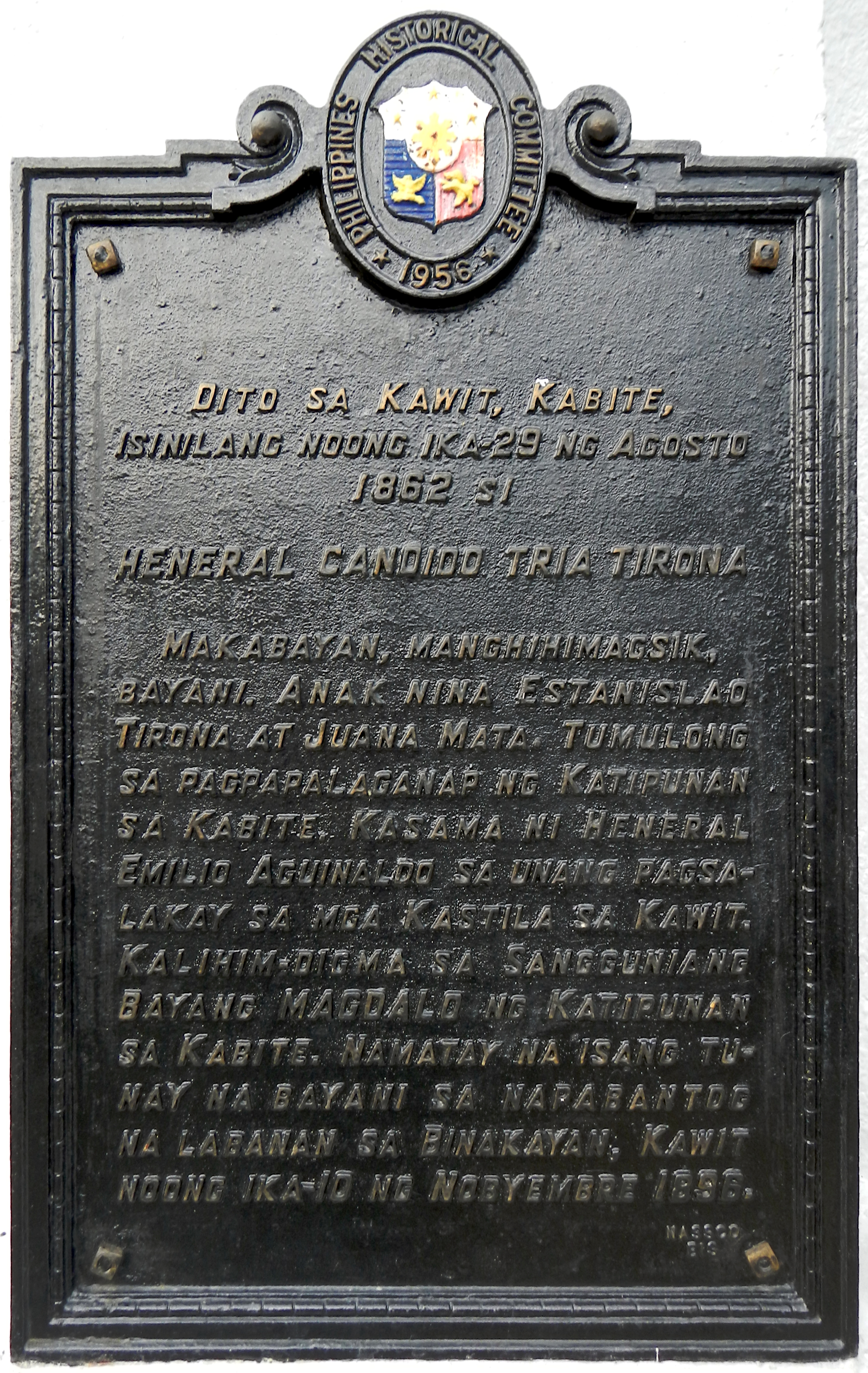
National historical marker installed in 1956 outside the Kawit parish church

Tirona was born to Don Estanislao Tirona and Juana Mata. His father was a capitan municipal of Cavite Viejo. His brother Daniel Tirona also became a general in the revolution.

== Portrayals ==
- 2012 – Portrayed by Ronnie Lazaro in El Presidente
