= Roque López =

Roque López Duarte (12 August 1747 – 14 October 1811) was a Spanish sculptor.

== Biography ==
López was born in Era Alta, an independent small village close to Murcia. He was the second son of Roque López Duarte y Juana López Máiquez. When he was only 17 years old, he went to Murcia to become an apprentice to the Italian origin baroque sculptor Francisco Salzillo of who became his main disciple.

Only five months after working with him, Salzillo admired his student's work so much that in his will (made in 1764, although he died in 1783) he cited him as heir of his own work tools. With Salzillo, López learned from 1764 to 1783 the keys to baroque sculptures and biblical knowledge; in 1772 he is considered 'master'. To the style of Salzillo, López added a more realistic style and, as a result of that, greater expressiveness of his works. His technique of the "round lump" stands out. He is considered one of the last rococo sculptors before neoclassicism

According to his notebook, found in his study when he López died (Libro de la Verdad), throughout his career he created 466 sculptures, almost all of them religious, receiving commissions from many cities, towns and villages in southeastern Spain, mainly in Murcia, Albacete, Ciudad Real, Toledo and Madrid. His sculptures decorated churches, convents and private residence. He had two children: José and María.

== Art career ==
Some of his masterpieces are the Capture of Christ (Tobarra), Our Father Jesus Nazarene (Murcia, Lorca, Alatoz and Alhama de Murcia), Christ Risen (Lorca), Our Lady of the Incarnation (La Raya), Our Lady of Los Remedios (Torreagüera), Our Lady del Rosario (Sucina), Our Lady of Sorrows (Murcia, Águilas and Beniaján), Saint Joseph with the Child (Murcia, Totana and Lorca), Saint Michael (Huercal-Overa), Saint John Evangelist (Murcia and Alhuazas), Saint Cecilia (Murcia), Saint Paul Hermit (Murcia), Saint Peter of Alcántara (Murcia), Christ Child (Caudete) and The Samaritan (Murcia).

== Family ==
Duarte's wife, Lucía Hernández Martínez, died in 1807 in Murcia. López died in Mula from yellow fever, which murdered also his only son José López as well as his niece Lorenzo López.

== Legacy ==
In 2011, the bicentenary of his death, the Museo Salzillo in Murcia organized a major exhibition of his works entitled Roque López. La mirada del discípulo.
