= Flaviano Yengko =

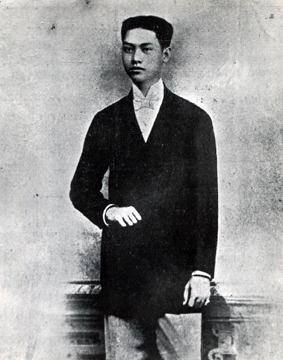
- Yengko in 1896
- Born: Flaviano Yengko y Abad; December 22, 1874; Tondo, Manila, Captaincy General of the Philippines
- Died: March 3, 1897 (aged 22); Imus, Cavite, Captaincy General of the Philippines
- Military career
- Allegiance: Katipunan (Magdalo)
- Service years: 1896–1897
- Rank: General
- Conflicts: Philippine Revolution: Battle of Binakayan; Battle of Zapote Bridge; Battle of Salitran

Flaviano Yengko y Abad (December 22, 1874 – March 3, 1897) was one of the youngest generals during the Philippine Revolution, next only to Gregorio del Pilar (The Boy General) and Manuel Tinio y Bundoc (commander of the Tinio Brigade. The Soul of Insurrection in the North. The "Magiting" of Katipunan). He was regarded as the "Hero of Salitran".

== Early life ==
Flaviano was born on December 22, 1874, in Tondo, Manila, to Babilio Yengko, a Chinese mestizo from Tondo, Manila, and Maria Abad of Imus, Cavite. When he was five years old, he began to study at the Escuela Normal. He finished with the qualification maestro de ascenso. Then, he obtained his Bachelor of Arts at Colegio de San Juan de Letran. He later took law at the University of Santo Tomas, and worked for some time as a clerk in the Court of First Instance at Binondo, but then he decided to quit the course when the Philippine Revolution broke out in August 1896. He left home to join the Revolution, leaving a note for his mother that he was going to "fight for the Fatherland".

== Love story and the Revolution ==
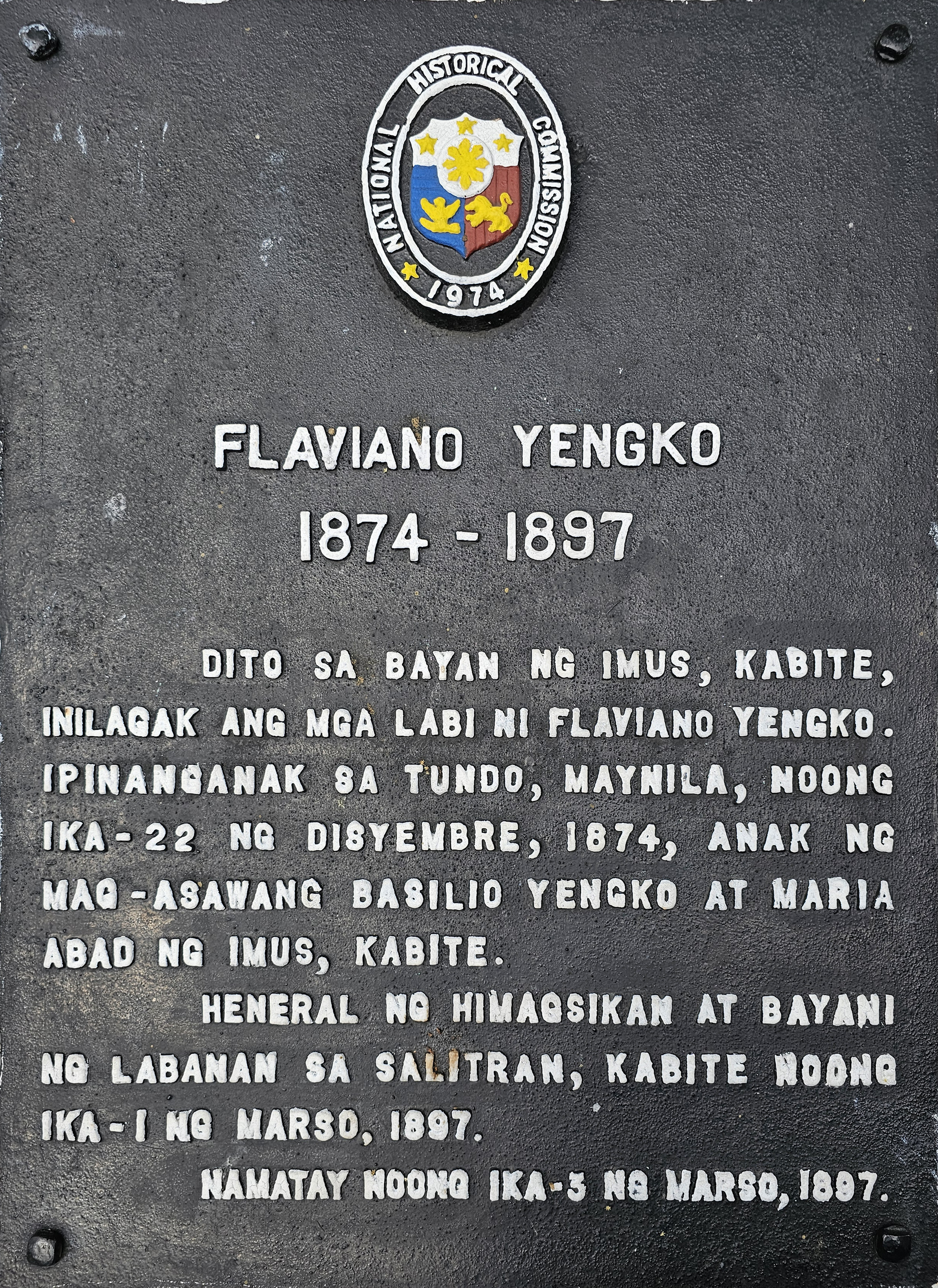
Historical marker installed by the National Historical Commission in Imus, Cavite, which is where Yengko's remains were interred.

Yengko originally did not want to fight in the Revolution, as he was then finishing his law course, but one primary factor that pushed him to do so had to do with his love story. He had a rival for a young woman of Cavite who had distinguished himself in more than one battle during the Revolution. Though the woman favored Yengko, her father, perhaps a patriot, was inclined toward Yengko's young rival. To make his daughter make up her mind, he used to tell her, "What can you expect from a dude like him (Yengko) who does not know anything but to dress himself like a woman and is incapable of picking up a gun and fighting like a man for our cause?"

The words of the father eventually reached the ears of Yengko, and as he was a man of deep honor, he decided to show that the father had a misconception of him. From then on, there took place a real contest between the two rivals to perform the most courageous acts in the Revolution.

On November 8, 1896, Yengko reached Imus, where he presented himself to General Emilio Aguinaldo. The first assignment given to him was the transport of gunpowder from Manila to Cavite.

He then fought at the Battle of Binakayan, which took place from November 9 to 11, 1896. It was considered the first major victory of Filipino revolutionaries during Philippine Revolution. Yengko's bravery and valor during the battle caught the attention of General Aguinaldo, who promoted him to the rank of captain after the battle. By December 1896, he had the rank of a colonel. Still, he was dressed in a neat and elegant woolen suit.

On February 13, 1897, Governor General Camilo de Polavieja opened his first phase to regain territory lost to the revolutionaries, the Cavite campaign. General José de Lachambre, Polavieja's deputy, advanced against the revolutionaries with 16,000 men armed with Spanish M93s (also known as Mausers), and one field battery. Many of the soldiers he led were from Pampanga, which were fired during Ramon Blanco's administration.

Yengko, along with other revolutionaries led by Aguinaldo and General Edilberto Evangelista, fought the Spanish at the Battle of Zapote Bridge. The battle was a Filipino victory, but the counterattack made on February 22 caused only a Filipino retreat. Despite that, Aguinaldo promoted Yengko to brigadier general for his performance in the encounter.

After the fall of Perez Dasmarinas to enemy control, Yengko, along with General Crispulo Aguinaldo and Colonel Juan Cailles, defended Salitran in hopes to stop the Spanish advance to Imus, the capital of the Cavite revolutionaries. During the battle that ensued on March 1, he was fatally wounded in the abdomen and was carried by his men to a military hospital in Imus. At the hospital, his love comforted him. With the satisfaction of a reciprocated love and the glory of having fought for his country, he died on March 3, 1897, due to urinal complication.
