= Gregoria Montoya =

Filipina revolutionary

- Born: November 28, 1863; Kawit, Cavite, Captaincy General of the Philippines
- Died: November 10, 1896 (aged 32); Dalahican, Cavite, Captaincy General of the Philippines
- Military career
- Allegiance: Katipunan
- Service years: 1896
- Conflicts: Philippine Revolution

Gregoria Montoya y Patricio (1863–1896) was a Filipina revolutionary who fought during the Philippine Revolution.

== Biography ==
To avenge her husband, also a revolutionary who died during the Revolution, Montoya led a 30-member unit of the Katipunan, wielding a bolo on one hand and carrying the Katipunan flag in the other at the Battle of Binakayan-Dalahican. She was killed in action during the battle, but her leadership contributed to a decisive Filipino victory.
