= Battle of Binakayan–Dalahican =

Part of the Philippine Revolution

- Part of the Philippine Revolution
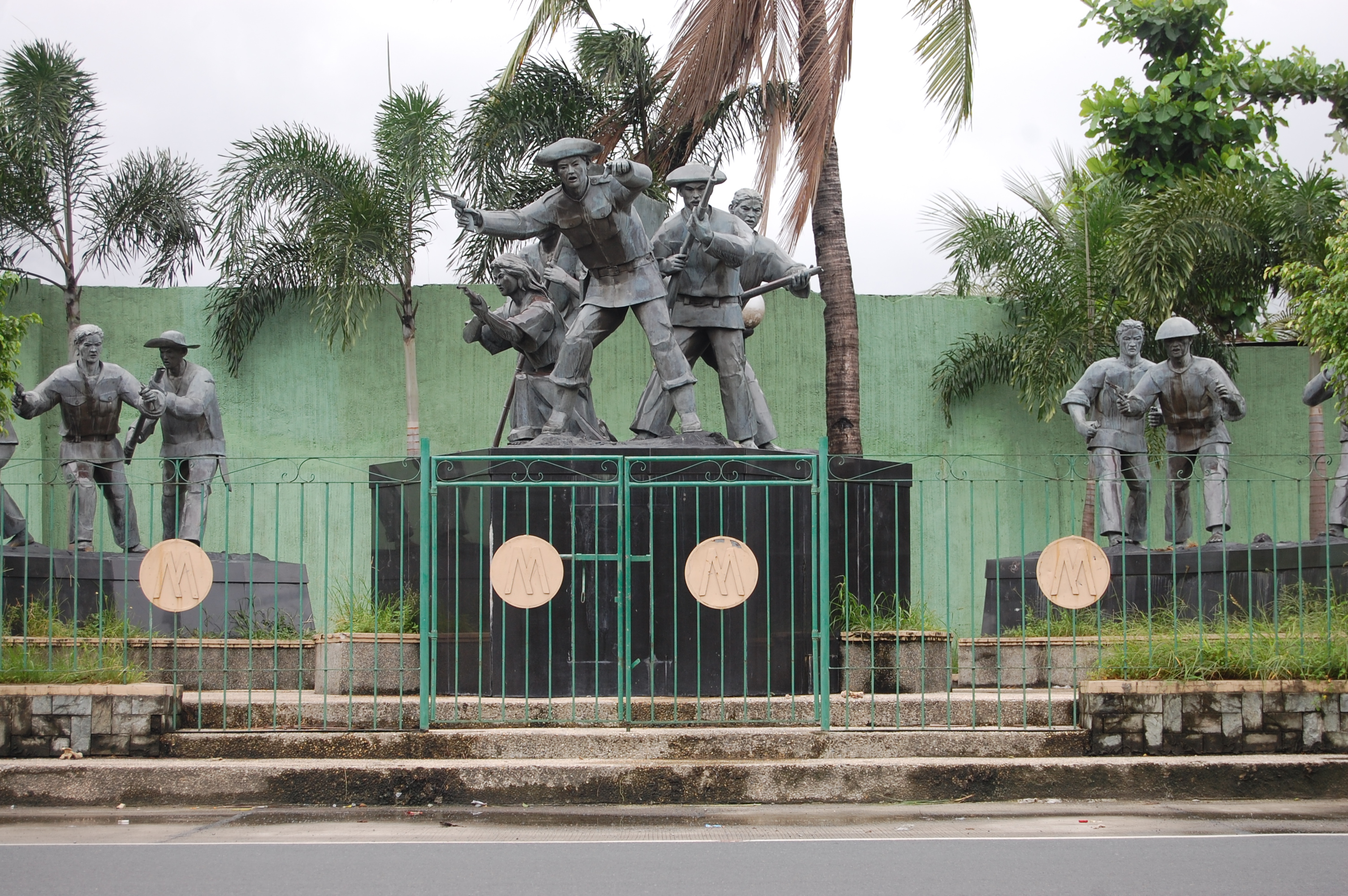
- Monument of the Battle of Binakayan
Date	November 9–11, 1896
Location	Northern Cavite, Spanish East Indies (now Philippines); Major fighting: Noveleta, and Cavite el Viejo towns, plus the city of Cavite; Minor fighting or skirmishes: Imus and Bacoor towns
Result	Filipino victory
Territorial changes	Filipinos liberate all of Cavite and parts of Laguna and Batangas

Belligerents
Katipunan: Magdalo; Magdiwang; Matagumpay	Spanish Empire: Guardia Civil

Commanders and leaders
Emilio Aguinaldo; Santiago Alvarez; Pio del Pilar; Candido Tirona †; Crispulo Aguinaldo; Baldomero Aguinaldo; Gregoria Montoya †; Artemio Ricarte; Pascual Alvarez; Edilberto Evangelista; Vito Belarmino; Flaviano Yengko; Pantaleon Garcia; Mariano Riego de Dios	Ramón Blanco; Diego de los Ríos; Fermín Díaz Matoni; José Marina (WIA); Mariano Borraja †; Victoriano Oloriz (WIA); Marcelino Muñoz (WIA); Norberto Baturone y Gener †; José Castro †; Fernando Chacon †

Strength
105,000 (Note: Combined military strength of both battles of Binakayan and Dalahican.): 35,000 regulars and militiamen; 65,000+ armed peasants & volunteers	24,000–26,000; At Binakayan; 20,995: 8,000 Spanish Army troops on land; 1,612 Spanish Marines on ships; 1,328 infantry of the 4th Cazadores Battalion; 55 generals of the 4th Cazadores Battalion; 2 companies from 73rd Regiment; 1 company of artillery; 60 military engineers; 2 naval warships; 4 gunboats; 10,000+ native mercenaries and loyalists; At Dalahican; 3,000–5,000: 1,500–3,500 from the 4th Battalion of Cazadores; 4 large guns; 3 bronze mortars; Several contingents from 73rd Native Regiment

Casualties and losses
At Binakayan: 300+ confirmed deaths ≈3,000 more casualties At Dalahican: ≈400–700 casualties	At Binakayan~500+ confirmed deaths (including 9 officers) ≈8,000 more casualties At Dalahican: 1,000+ casualties Hundreds more captured in Cavite City

The Battle of Binakayan–Dalahican (Tagalog: Labanan sa Binakayan–Dalahikan; Spanish: Batalla de Binakayan-Dalahican) was a simultaneous battle during the Philippine Revolution that was fought on November 9–11, 1896 that led to a decisive Filipino victory. The twin battle took place at the shores of Binakayan, in the town of Cavite Viejo (also called Cavite el Viejo, now Kawit); Dalahican and Dagatan in Noveleta; and, to minimal extent, in Imus and Bacoor towns in Cavite, Philippines that lasted for two days before the Spanish army retreated demoralized and in disarray. The result of the battle was the first significant Filipino victory in the country's history.

== Background ==
By the time the revolution began in August 1896, Cavite was one of the first provinces in the Philippines to declare independence from Spain. Earlier in the war, the Filipino revolutionaries under the Supremo Andres Bonifacio, the leader and the instigator of the revolution, attempted to invest then take Manila by force, but was stymied by severe lack of decent weapons in their part as well as the reluctance of other revolutionary provincial armies, especially the ones from Cavite which also had difficulty in mounting such an attack then rather attacked local Spanish garrisons in the province, from taking part of the engagement. The Supremo Bonifacio had been repeatedly defeated in battle, losing his prestige as well as the morale of some men who were serving at his side, especially those who were from Bulacan and Morong provinces. In contrast, the revolutionaries in the province had been largely successful in battles from the start of the revolution against the Spaniards, though outnumbered. Spanish general Ernesto de Aguirre and had been defeated by the rebels more than two months earlier during the Battle of Imus in September 1896, including generals Emilio Aguinaldo of the Magdalo faction. The former successfully led a small uprising in Cavite el Viejo on August 31, 1896, where he defeated and killed the Spanish commander of the Guardia Civil, after Bonifacio's defeat at the Battle of San Juan del Monte. The leadership was then passed from his cousin, Baldomero, to him, where most of Magdalo members and revolutionaries regarded him as their leader.

In Cavite, the Sangguniang Bayan (provincial council) of the Katipunan have two popular councils presiding its members over their respective areas. One of this council is the Magdiwang Council, which was headed by Mariano Álvarez encompassing the municipalities of Alfonso, Bailen (now called General Emilio Aguinaldo), Indang, Magallanes, Maragondon, Naic, Rosario, San Francisco de Malabon (now General Trias), San Roque (now part of Cavite City), Tanza, and Ternate. The other council, Magdalo, is headed by Baldomero Aguinaldo and presides the towns of Amadeo, Bacoor, Carmona, Perez-Dasmariñas (now Dasmariñas), Cavite el Viejo, Mendez Núñez (now Mendez), and Silang. Magdalo's name originated from Aguinaldo's pseudonym for Katipunan which was rooted from Santa Magdalena (Saint Mary Magdalene), Cavite Viejos's patron saint. Magdalo held its capital in Imus, while Magdiwang was based in the town of Noveleta.

On October 31, 1896, Emilio Aguinaldo, now a general of the revolutionary army and still afresh from his victory at Imus, announced in a 773-word manifesto that the revolution aimed for the total independence of the whole Philippines. Later that same day, this had the effect of an attempt for a centralized government named "Republica Filipina". It stipulated that the Magdalo faction is to be its acknowledged revolutionary government, with Baldomero Aguinaldo named as the president and Emilio Aguinaldo named as the commander-in-chief, although the leadership of Bonifacio as the Supremo of the Katipunan currently existed. However, with Bonifacio defeated battle after battle and subsequently his influence dwindling, the Magdalo faction being victorious in every battle became increasingly seen by the Caviteños as the legitimate carrier and leader of the revolution. Due to this, huge throngs of Caviteños rallied to Imus and Kawit and joined the Magdalo on the hopes that their land will be rid from Spanish dominion, such that their numbers were far too many to be properly led by a single commander; they saw "Heneral Miong" as they called Emilio as their leader.

== Prelude ==
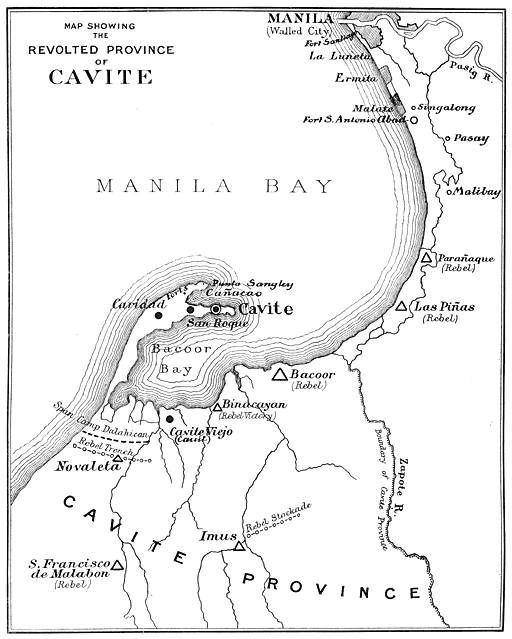
Map of Cavite province showing stockades created by revolutionaries.

General Álvarez and Colonel Inocencio Salud took charge of the construction of the bamboo fortifications in Dalahican known as “Battery Numbers 1,2 and 3” in September 1896. Dalahican was a strategic barrio guarding the entrance to the Cavite peninsula.

Alarmed by a previous siege led by General Aguinaldo in Imus in September 1896, Governor-General Ramón Blanco y Erenas ordered the 4th Battalion of Cazadores from Spain to aid him in quelling the rebellion in Cavite. On November 3, 1896, the battalion arrived carrying a squadron of 1,328 men and some 55 generals. Apart from that, Blanco ordered about 8,000 men who recently came from Cuba and Spain to join in suppressing the rebellion when he learned that insurgents already occupied most of Las Piñas and Parañaque towns in the outskirts of Manila, and they later cantoned in Bacoor to rendezvous with Blanco's army in Cavite as well as to fend off any possible reinforcements from the provinces of northern and central Luzon, specifically the provinces of Bulacan and Morong where the Supremo Bonifacio and his forces were still remaining.

Prior to the land attacks, Spanish naval raids were conducted on the shores of Cavite, where cannonballs were bombarded against the revolutionary fortifications in Bacoor, Noveleta, Binakayan and Cavite Viejo. The most fortified locations in Noveleta are the Dalahican and Dagatan shores defended by Magdiwang soldiers, while the adjacent fishing village of Binakayan in Kawit was fortified by Magdalo. Spanish naval operations were determined to crush the fortifications in these areas, mainly because the lake around Dalahican was so strategic as it connects to the interior of Cavite. Apart from defending Binakayan, the Magdalo soldiers also kept the lower part of Dagatan up to Cavite's border near Morong province (now Rizal province).

Cavite City, the capital of the province, is connected by a narrow isthmus in Dalahican to the mainland Cavite province. Blanco feared of the port city falling to the hands of the rebels who by this time already have controlled nearly all of the province save for the city and the town of Bacoor. Each day, the stockade advanced towards the isthmus and to the outskirts of Cavite City itself. To prevent further mishaps and the fall of whole Cavite to the Filipino rebels, Blanco launched twin attacks to the stockades in both Cavite el Viejo and Noveleta to drive the rebels back towards inland Cavite province and hopefully, for the Spanish, disintegrate their army thus ending the rebellion in the province.

By November 1, the military activity in the area by the Spanish had increased in intensity, with warships patrolling the seas in the area and artillery from the naval armory of Cavite City occasionally shelling the shores of Kawit and Noveleta. This greatly concerned the Magdiwang general Santiago Alvarez in Dalahican, who personally rode on a horse and went to the house of the Aguinaldo family in Kawit to discuss military matters and plans with the Magdalo general Emilio Aguinaldo. When word of the Spanish army rallying outside Manila and additional reinforcements from Cuba and Spain proper disembarking in Manila via a few Manileño katipuneros who fled south to Cavite after Bonifacio's defeat arrived in the revolutionary headquarters in Kawit, it soon became clear that a Spanish assault towards Cavite is underway and hence a defensive strategy was needed. To suit for such needs, Emilio Aguinaldo vouched for his cousin Baldomero to have general Edilberto Evangelista construct trenches and fougasses stretching from Noveleta to Kawit all the way to the boundary with Bacoor.

== Disposition of forces ==
The Filipino Katipunan revolutionaries numbered about 100,000 men including 35,000 regulars and hastily conscripted local militia armed with short swords as well as rifles and muskets including ammunition acquired and looted from the captured municipal offices of the Guardia Civil across Cavite, and more or less 65,000 peasants and laborers armed on the spot and volunteers both civilian and medical desperately gathered from all Katipunan-controlled parts of Cavite. The regulars and militia were posted in the trenches while the peasant levies were positioned behind them, with the trench system being a mile and a half long stockade and dense trench networks stretching between Noveleta along Dalahican and to the Morong-Cavite provincial border in the north, cutting of and preventing overland reinforcements from Manila towards Cavite City. A "conservative" estimate by a contemporary Spanish priest based in Manila during the same era counted roughly 105,000 men under arms were present in the field.

On November 8, Blanco commissioned Colonel José Marina to command the attack on the Binakayan front in Cavite Viejo. The column assigned to Marina included nearly 20,000 men, among them more than 9,000 Spaniards: 1,600 marine infantry, two companies from the 73rd Native Regiment, a company of artillery, 60 military engineers from the 6th Company of Engineers, two naval warships, and four gunboats. The 73rd Native Regiment included Filipino native auxiliaries, but more than 10,000 native mercenaries, loyalists and volunteers were also assigned to the attack on Binakayan. Forts in Cavite City opened fire on approaching revolutionaries, as the warships Castilla, Reina Cristina, and the gunboats Bulusan, Leyte, Villalobos and Cebu destroyed stockades in Noveleta and Cavite el Viejo.

== Battle ==
Emilio Aguinaldo, the chief commander of the revolutionary forces at Binakayan.

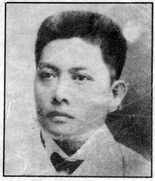
Santiago Alvarez, the chief commander of the revolutionary forces at Dalahican.

The first attack on November 8 coincided with Cavite City's week-long fiesta celebrating its patron saint, Our Lady of Solitude of Porta Vaga. Despite the wails of revolution, pilgrims of the Virgin flocked the city, with revolutionists cooperating and attending all of the festivities and celebrations. The sound of cannonballs hitting the shores of Cavite was only taken by local townsfolk as the enemy's contribution to the fiesta. By nightfall, Spanish firings intensified, but the rebels took no action, to honor the Virgin of Solitude.

Meanwhile, Emilio Aguinaldo, the leader of the council defending Binakayan, was at the boundary of Laguna and Batangas with a few aides and militiamen, thinking that the enemy would approach there. However, when he heard news that Spanish forces were building up in Binakayan by the morning of November 8, he and his men hurried back to defend the stockades and arrived at evening of the same day at Cavite el Viejo. From there, he hurried to the village of Binakayan to supervise its defense while Alvarez, already stationed in Noveleta, was to defend the village of Dalahican.

=== Attack in Binakayan ===
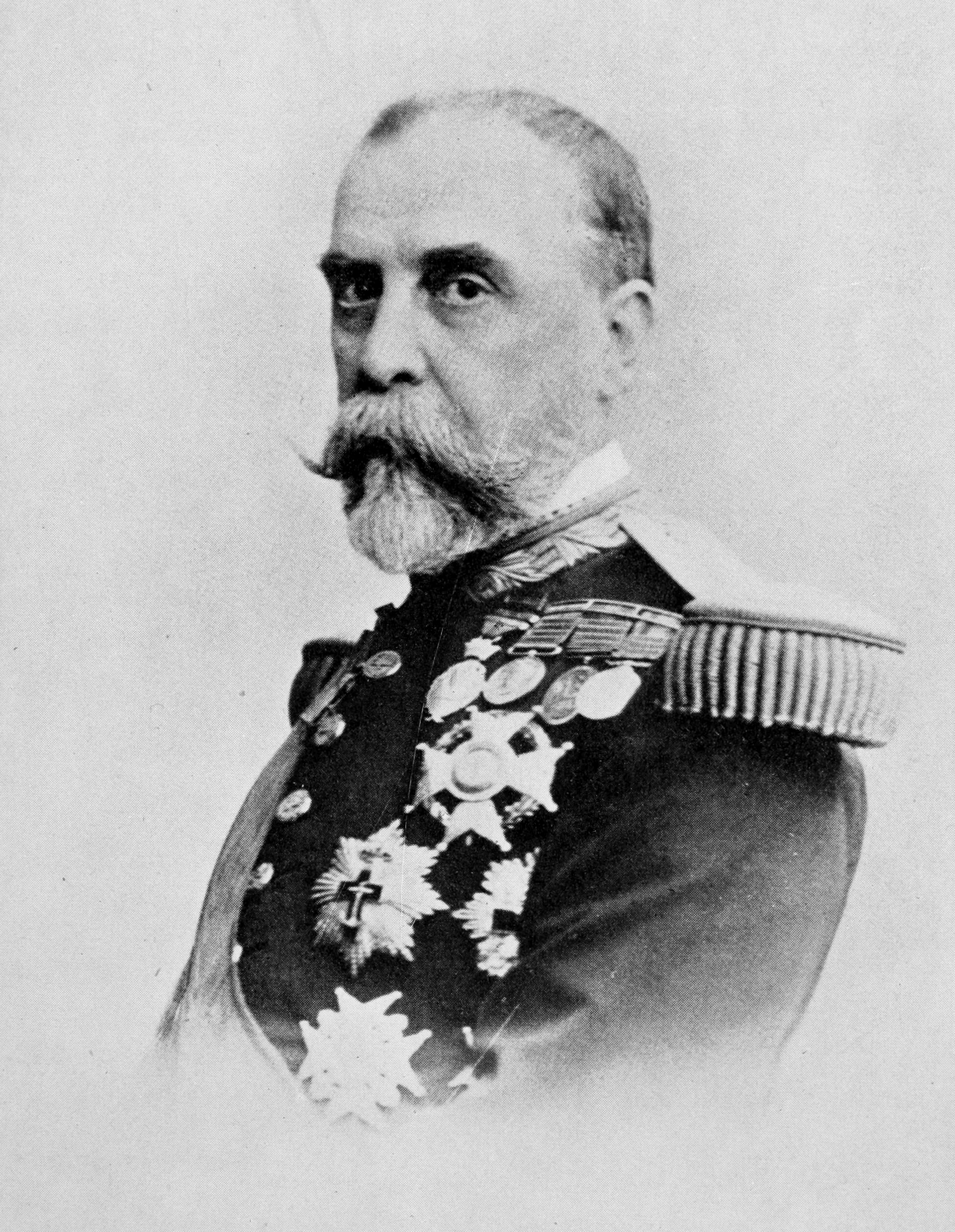
Ramón Blanco over all commander in chief of the Spanish forces in Binakayan and Dalahican.

At 6 a.m. on November 9, 1896, after a series of artillery bombardments, Spanish soldiers launched a siege towards rebel fortifications in Binakayan and Dalahikan. The columns were twofold: the first one, commanded by Col. José Marina headed to Binakayan, while the second one by General Diego de los Ríos approached entrenchments at Dalahican.

As the Spanish forces assaulted the Filipino battlements, Aguinaldo was surprised to see that they could not penetrate the excellent trench system designed by General Edilberto Evangelista. Although, during the Spanish advance, Candido Tirona, one of the Filipino generals present in the battle, was stabbed in the neck and killed by a Spaniard while observing the battle from a coconut tree not far from the shore. The revolutionaries then conducted a series of massive counterattacks with their bolos and machetes to curb the Spanish advance heading towards Binakayan and Cavite el Viejo, but each wave only produced massive losses at their side. The revolutionaries later halted their attacks, but their acts slowed the enemy's advance long enough for more of their men from their rear to later join the fray.

On November 10, a woman named Gregoria "Gloria" P. Montoya joined Aguinaldo while defending the fort. Aguinaldo requested Gloria to leave the fortification, but she refused. She claimed she wanted to avenge the death of her Katipunero husband who died a day ago during the attacks in Dalahican. To serve the post, Aguinaldo gave Gloria several units to delay the incoming Spanish reinforcement marching from Bacoor, Cavite, the reinforcement being the 8,000-strong force of Iberian and Cuban army contingents that were weeks earlier stationed in Las Piñas and Parañaque. Her most significant and memorable contribution to this battle was when she, by herself, dismantled the wooden bridge across the Imus River in Mabolo, Bacoor, which connects the town of Bacoor to Cavite Viejo. Because of her actions, Spanish reinforcements coming to Binakayan were delayee, though at the cost of her own life.

On November 11, Spanish forces advanced to destroy enemy entrenchment with no development of opposition from the rebels. When the army reached the road forking onwards between Cavite Viejo and Imus, their position became pelted by a long, dense line of entrenchments at short range. The main body defending the fortifications consisted of men armed with Remington rifles, a Mauser rifle, and native muskets and cannons loaded with improvised missiles made of scrap iron which were destructive to about "500 arms length". At every advance, more Spanish soldiers fell, including the officers. Aguinaldo subsequently ordered his soldiers to counterattack at the right moment with the most number of men available. Still reeling over the death of his friend and right-hand man Tirona two days earlier, he personally led the Filipino army at the front and furiously charged at the Spanish lines. Huge numbers of katipuneros then rushed into the fight in waves, swarming into several enemy units until, one by one, they were destroyed piecemeal. In the face such resistance, the remaining Spanish forces, battered and demoralized, were forced to retreat back to their ships while some headed back instead to Manila, concluding the attack at Binakayan. The Filipinos pursued, resulting in an utter rout for the Spanish army. Although the defeated Spanish suffered major losses, artillery fire coming from Spanish gunboats in Cavite City in support of the retreat prevented its annihilation. A small surviving group led by Marina rallied towards the entrenchment in Dalahican. By the end, the Spanish suffered roughly 500 dead, thousands wounded, missing, or taken captive, and lost about 200 guns, mostly Mausers and Remingtons, as well as munitions and other supplies.

=== Attack in Dalahican ===
The Battle of Dalahican lasted for 36 hours, as it had in Binakayan. About 3,000 Spanish troops, under Blanco's orders, marched towards Dalahican. Although initially successful in breaching Filipino defenses, the Spanish failed to totally destroy their positions and were rendered under constant attack by the Filipinos. During the battle, corpses of Spanish forces and revolutionaries alike were taken and stored in three wells under Alvarez's command. The Spanish attack at Dalahican completely failed, suffering more than 1,000 casualties in the process. With no way to withdraw to Manila due to the Filipino victory at Binakayan, they instead withdrew to Cavite City by nightfall of November 11, signalling the end of the battle.

== Aftermath ==
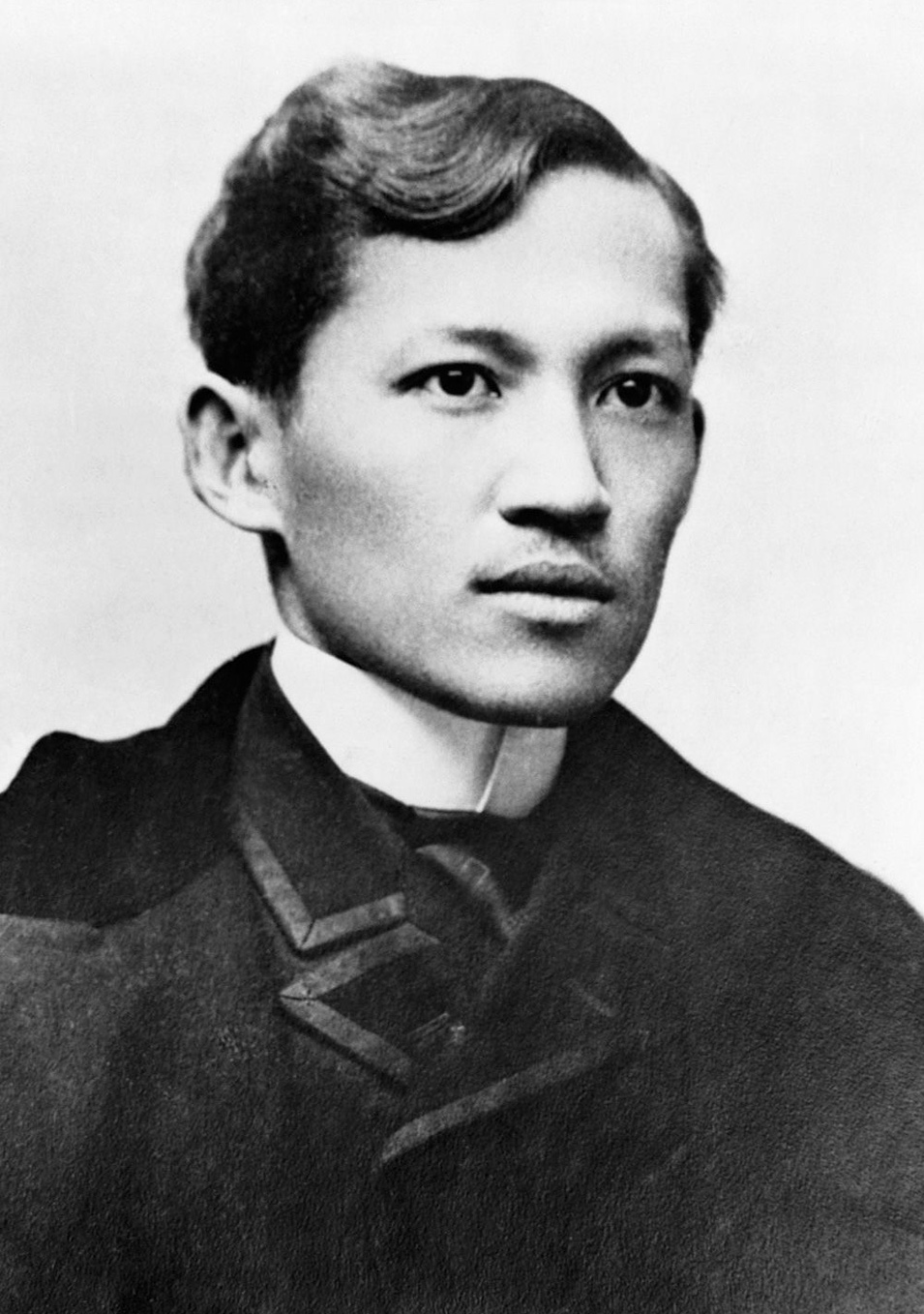
The Filipino writer and reformist José Rizal was accused of rebellion by the Spanish government, and the assumption became strong after the Katipunan's victories in Binakayan and Dalahican. He was thus executed on December 30, 1896, more than a month after the battle.

The decisive victories at Binakayan and Dalahican saved most of Cavite province from being recaptured by the Spaniards (most of Cavite was recaptured by the Spaniards upon Aguinaldo's exile by the provisions of the Pact of Biak-na-Bato in 1897). It paved the way for the Filipino revolutionaries to liberate nearby provinces from Spanish control. The Spanish colonial government became cautious of Aguinaldo's presence in Cavite, as this meant as long as Aguinaldo and his revolutionaries are in Cavite the revolution continues in the revolutionaries' favor; in fact, they began to fear him more than they could on Bonifacio. To make matters worse for the Spaniards, many more Filipinos in Batangas, Laguna, Pampanga, Bulacan and Morong joined the Katipunan independence movement inspired by the victory in Binakayan and Dalahican. The outcome of the battle even persuaded Bonifacio and his staff to retreat along with his men to the province to celebrate the victory with Aguinaldo and Álvarez later on December 1, 1896. What followed was that several townsfolk from all over nearby provinces raced to settle in the territory of the newly liberated Cavite, bringing with them their town bands, their patron saints, and so on. This period of temporary peace saw what the settlers of Cavite called "Ang Panahón ng Tagalog" (the Tagalog Era). After the battle, the Spanish government sent a document issuing ceasefire to Aguinaldo and not Bonifacio, which angered the latter. The Spanish forces had to recover for more than a month after their crushing defeat.

The battle made Aguinaldo, himself one of the chief commanders of the battle, a permanent legend and icon in Filipino history, as it was the first major Filipino victory of the war and of the Philippine history over a colonial power. Fighting the battle more decisively than Álvarez did on Dalahican, who also recognized his ability to win the battle and convinced that he must be the leader of the revolution along with several others, Aguinaldo used his victory as pretext to consolidate his position on the Katipunan over Bonifacio, who himself suffered numerous defeats, during the Tejeros Convention the next year, where he was elected as president of the revolutionary government "Republica Filipina". However, this did not stop the execution of the Filipino doctor and nationalist, José Rizal, under the new governor-general Camilo de Polavieja more than a month later after the battle, due to charges of rebellion, sedition, and conspiracy by the Spanish government. Ramón Blanco, the former governor-general of the Philippine islands at the time, gave Rizal time to leave the islands for Cuba, but was thus arrested while en route. The execution occurred on December 30 the same year.
