= List of presidents of the Philippines by date of death =

The following is a list of presidents of the Philippines by date of death. Thirteen out of the seventeen individuals who have served as president of the Philippines have died, three of them while in office. (Note: The four living presidents (in order of birth) are: Joseph Estrada (April 19, 1937), Rodrigo Duterte (March 28, 1945), Gloria Macapagal Arroyo (April 5, 1947), and Bongbong Marcos (September 13, 1957).) The oldest president at the time of death was Emilio Aguinaldo, who died at 94 years and 321 days. Ramon Magsaysay, who died in a plane crash at the age of 49 years and 198 days, was the youngest to die in office.

Two presidents died overseas, both in the United States: Manuel Quezon in New York in 1944, and Ferdinand Marcos in Hawaii in 1989. The most recent death was that of Fidel Ramos, who died on July 31, 2022.

== Presidents in order of death ==
Order of Death	President	Date (Note: Dates of death sorted by month and day)	Age	Cause	Place	Presidency
1	Manuel L. Quezon (Note: Died in office)	August 1, 1944	65	Tuberculosis	Saranac Lake, New York, United States	(2nd) November 15, 1935 – August 1, 1944
2	Manuel Roxas	April 15, 1948	56	Heart attack	Angeles, Pampanga	(5th) May 28, 1946 – April 15, 1948
3	Elpidio Quirino	February 29, 1956	65	Heart attack	Quezon City	(6th) April 17, 1948 – December 30, 1953
4	Ramon Magsaysay	March 17, 1957	49	Airplane crash	Balamban, Cebu	(7th) December 30, 1953 – March 17, 1957
5	Jose P. Laurel	November 6, 1959	68	Cerebral hemorrhage	Santa Mesa, Manila	(3rd) October 14, 1943 – August 17, 1945
6	Sergio Osmeña	October 19, 1961	83	Pulmonary edema	Quezon City	(4th) August 1, 1944 – May 28, 1946
7	Emilio Aguinaldo	February 6, 1964	94	Coronary thrombosis	Quezon City	(1st) January 23, 1899 – April 19, 1901
8	Carlos P. Garcia	June 14, 1971	74	Heart attack	Quezon City	(8th) March 18, 1957 – December 30, 1961
9	Ferdinand Marcos	September 28, 1989	72	Cardiac arrest	Honolulu, Hawaii, United States	(10th) December 30, 1965 – February 25, 1986
10	Diosdado Macapagal	April 21, 1997	86	Heart failure, pneumonia and renal complications	Makati	(9th) December 30, 1961 – December 30, 1965
11	Corazon Aquino	August 1, 2009	76	Cardiorespiratory arrest	Makati	(11th) February 25, 1986 – June 30, 1992
12	Benigno Aquino III	June 24, 2021	61	Renal disease, secondary to diabetes	Quezon City	(15th) June 30, 2010 – June 30, 2016
13	Fidel V. Ramos	July 31, 2022	94	COVID-19 complications	Makati	(12th) June 30, 1992 – June 30, 1998

Map of the Philippines denoting where each of the 11 of the 13 deceased Philippine presidents died
Presidents that died in Quezon City (5): Quirino, Osmeña, Aguinaldo, Garcia, Aquino III
Presidents that died in Makati (3): Macapagal, Aquino, C., Ramos
Map of the contiguous United States denoting where 1 of the 13 deceased Philippine presidents died
Map of Hawaii denoting where 1 of the 13 deceased Philippine presidents died

== Died same age ==
=== Same age (rounded down to nearest year) ===
- 94: Emilio Aguinaldo and Fidel V. Ramos
- 65: Manuel L. Quezon and Elpidio Quirino

== Died before multiple predecessors ==
Manuel Roxas (left), Elpidio Quirino (center), and Ramon Magsaysay (right) were each outlived by three of their predecessors, more than any other Philippine president.

5th president Manuel Roxas (died April 15, 1948)

- 11 years, 205 days before 3rd president Jose P. Laurel (died November 6, 1959)
- 13 years, 187 days before 4th president Sergio Osmeña (died October 19, 1961)
- 15 years, 297 days before 1st president Emilio Aguinaldo (died February 6, 1964)

6th president Elpidio Quirino (died February 29, 1956)

- 3 years, 251 days before 3rd president Jose P. Laurel (died November 6, 1959)
- 5 years, 233 days before 4th president Sergio Osmeña (died October 19, 1961)
- 7 years, 343 days before 1st president Emilio Aguinaldo (died February 6, 1964)

7th president Ramon Magsaysay (died March 17, 1957)

- 2 years, 234 days before 3rd president Jose P. Laurel (died November 6, 1959)
- 4 years, 216 days before 4th president Sergio Osmeña (died October 19, 1961)
- 6 years, 326 days before 1st president Emilio Aguinaldo (died February 6, 1964)

== Died after multiple successors ==
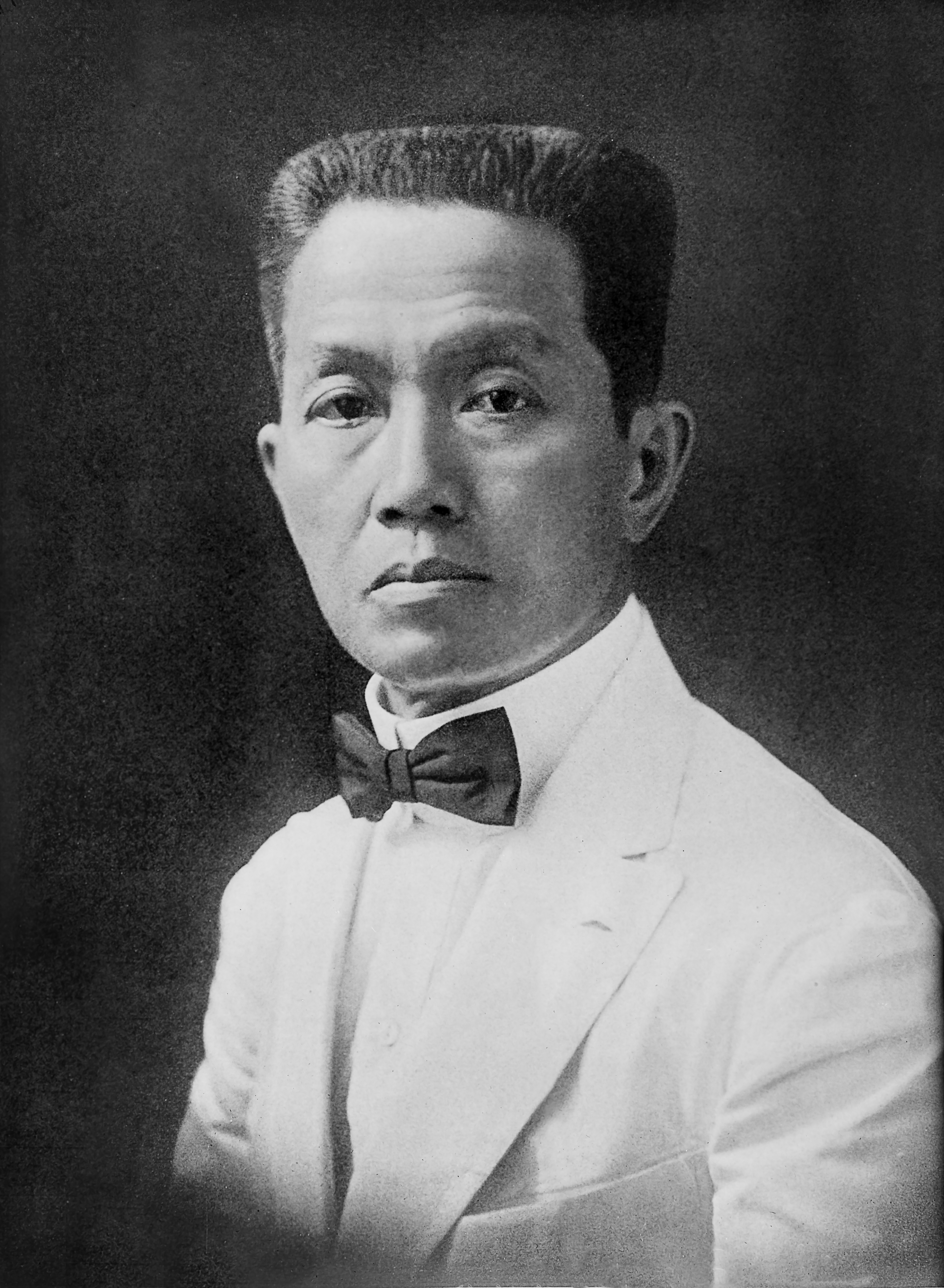
Emilio Aguinaldo outlived six of his successors, more than any other Philippine president

1st president Emilio Aguinaldo (died February 6, 1964)

- 19 years, 189 days after 2nd president Manuel L. Quezon (died August 1, 1944)
- 15 years, 297 days after 5th president Manuel Roxas (died April 15, 1948)
- 7 years, 343 days after 6th president Elpidio Quirino (died February 29, 1956)
- 6 years, 326 days after 7th president Ramon Magsaysay (died March 17, 1957)
- 4 years, 92 days after 3rd president Jose P. Laurel (died November 6, 1959)
- 2 years, 110 days after 4th president Sergio Osmeña (died October 19, 1961)

3rd president Jose P. Laurel (died November 6, 1959)

- 11 years, 205 days after 5th president Manuel Roxas (died April 15, 1948)
- 3 years, 251 days after 6th president Elpidio Quirino (died February 29, 1956)
- 2 years, 234 days after 7th president Ramon Magsaysay (died March 17, 1957)

4th president Sergio Osmeña (died October 19, 1961)

- 13 years, 187 days after 5th president Manuel Roxas (died April 15, 1948)
- 5 years, 233 days after 6th president Elpidio Quirino (died February 29, 1956)
- 4 years, 216 days after 7th president Ramon Magsaysay (died March 17, 1957)

== See also ==
- List of burial places of presidents and vice presidents of the Philippines
