= Ongpin =

Ongpin is a surname. Notable people with the surname include:

- Jaime Ongpin (1939–1987), Filipino businessman and activist
- Roberto Ongpin (1937–2023), Filipino businessman
- Román Ongpin (1847–1912), Chinese-Filipino businessman
