= Gota de Leche =

Coordinates: 14.60290°N 120.98842°E

- Founded: 1906
- Founder: Trinidad Rizal, Concepcion Felix
- Type: Non-governmental organization
- Location: 859 S. Loyola St., Sampaloc, Manila, Philippines
- Region served: Philippines
- Owner: La Protección de la Infancia Inc.

Gota de Leche (lit. A Drop of Milk) is a foundation started by Trinidad Rizal (sister of Philippine National Hero, Dr. José Rizal) and Concepción Felix in 1906 that primarily aims to provide nutritional and medical needs of indigent Filipino mothers and their children. Founded by La Protección de la Infancia Inc., the foundation continues to deliver daily milk rations to Filipino infants

== Building ==
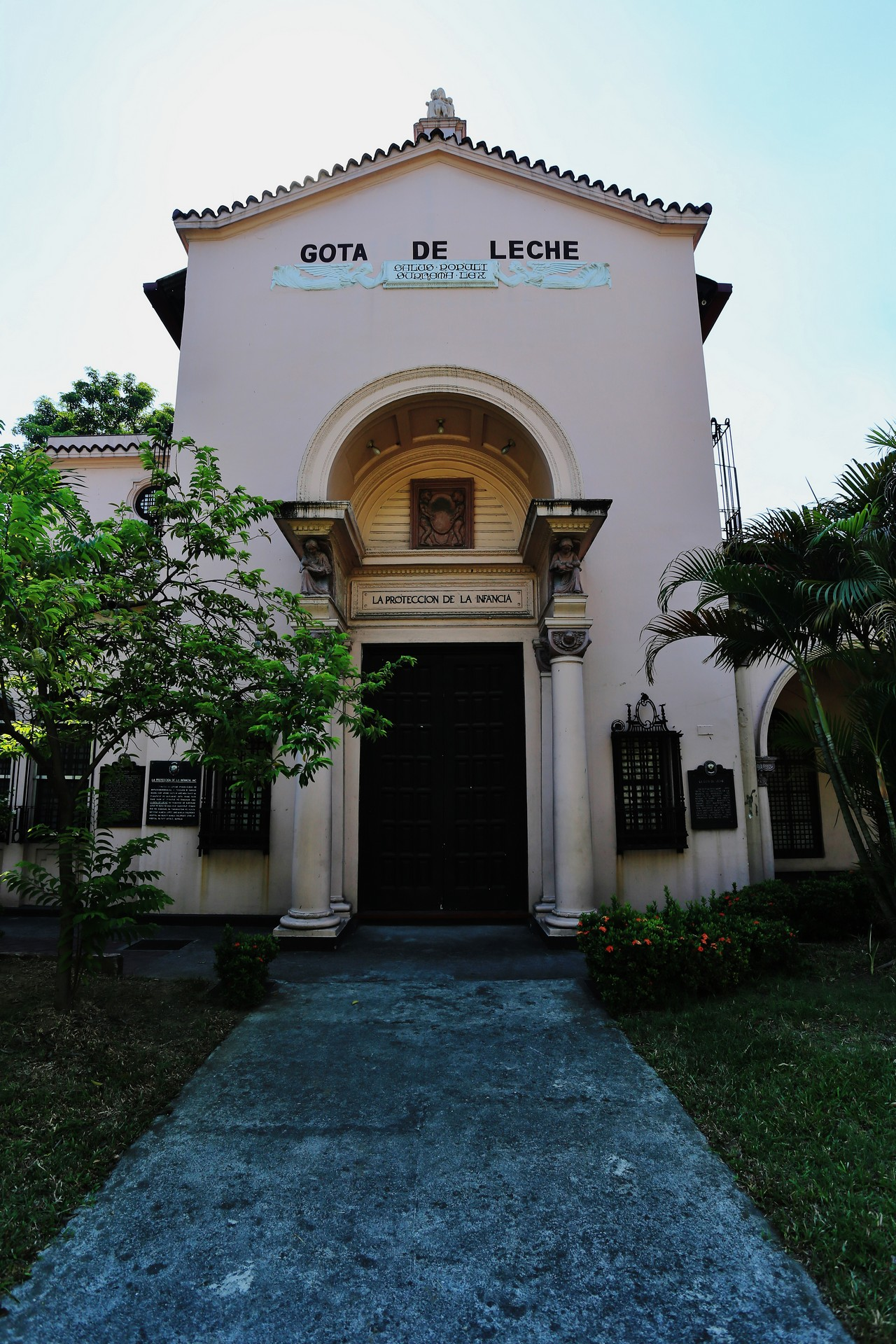
Facade of the Gota de Leche Building in Sampaloc, Manila

Its headquarters, the Gota de Leche building located at 859 S. Loyota St., Sampaloc, Manila, Philippines, designed by architects Juan Arellano and Arcadio Arellano (founding father of Philippine architecture), was awarded Honourable Mention by the UNESCO Asia Pacific Heritage Awards for Cultural Heritage Conservation in 2003. This opened further support from the National Commission on Culture and the Arts.

The Gota de Leche Building was declared by the National Museum of the Philippines as an Important Cultural Property in August 2014.

== History ==
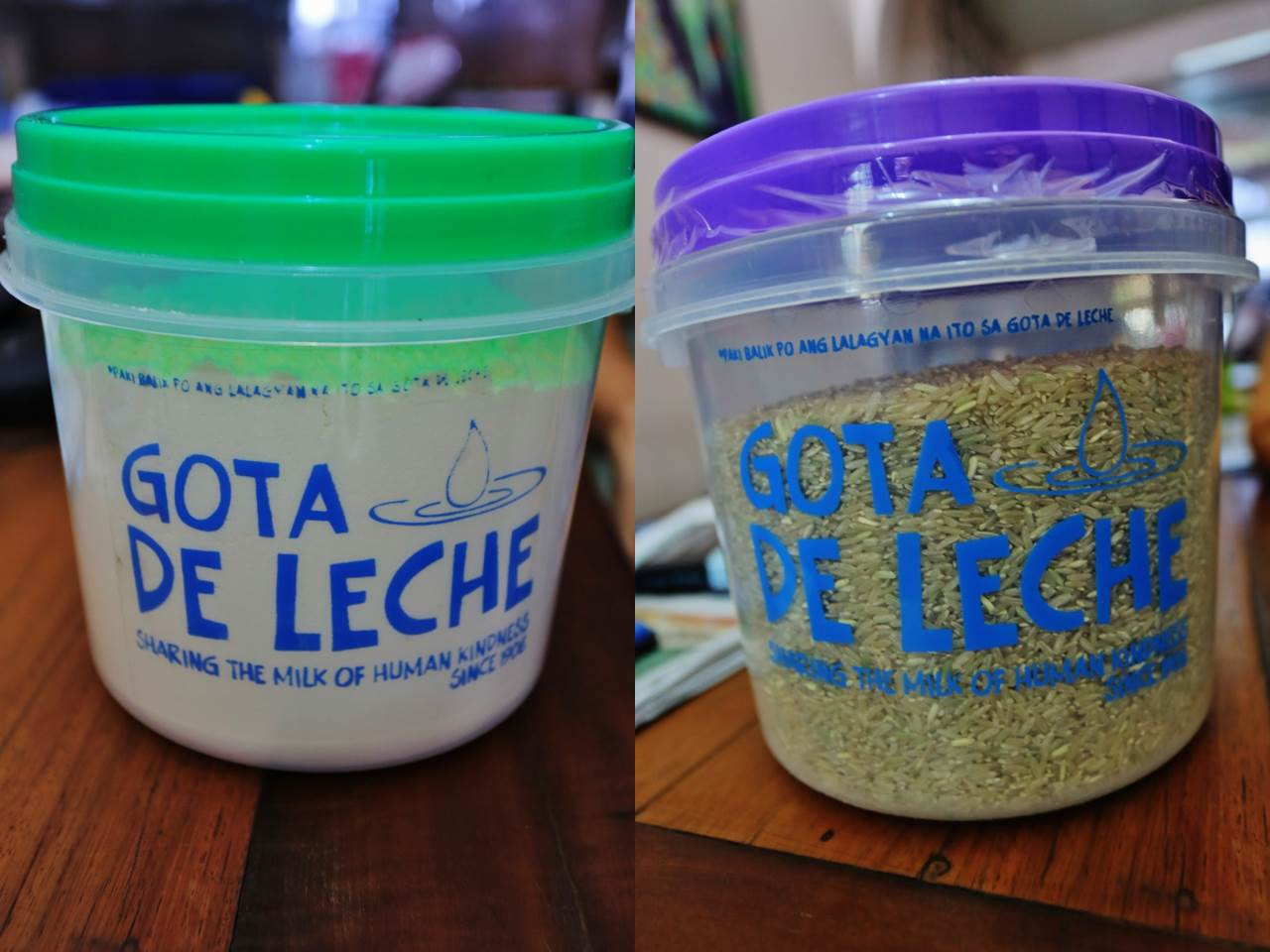
Milk and Brown Rice Canisters

Beriberi, a sickness caused by a nutritional deficit in Vitamin B1 or Thiamine, was discovered among Filipino women after the Philippine–American War in 1902. Hundreds of infants died before ever reaching 3 months old and it was found that the milk coming from affected mothers were causing these deaths. This distressing condition moved a group of women to address the situation. And so in 1905, Asosación Feminista Filipina was born. It was led by Trinidad Rizal and Concepcion Felix, together with other educated women of the time.

Gota de Leche was established the year after, in 1906, as station that manages the daily distribution of pasteurized cow’s milk to Filipino infants. They also provide nutrition education programs to Filipino mothers.

This project was recognized as heroic and in order for it to further succeed, the founders needed to collaborate with other professionals who were willing to lend a helping hand to the cause. The collaboration subsequently led to the formation of La Protección de la Infacia Inc., the Philippines’ first independent charity organization constituted by doctors and business leaders among others.

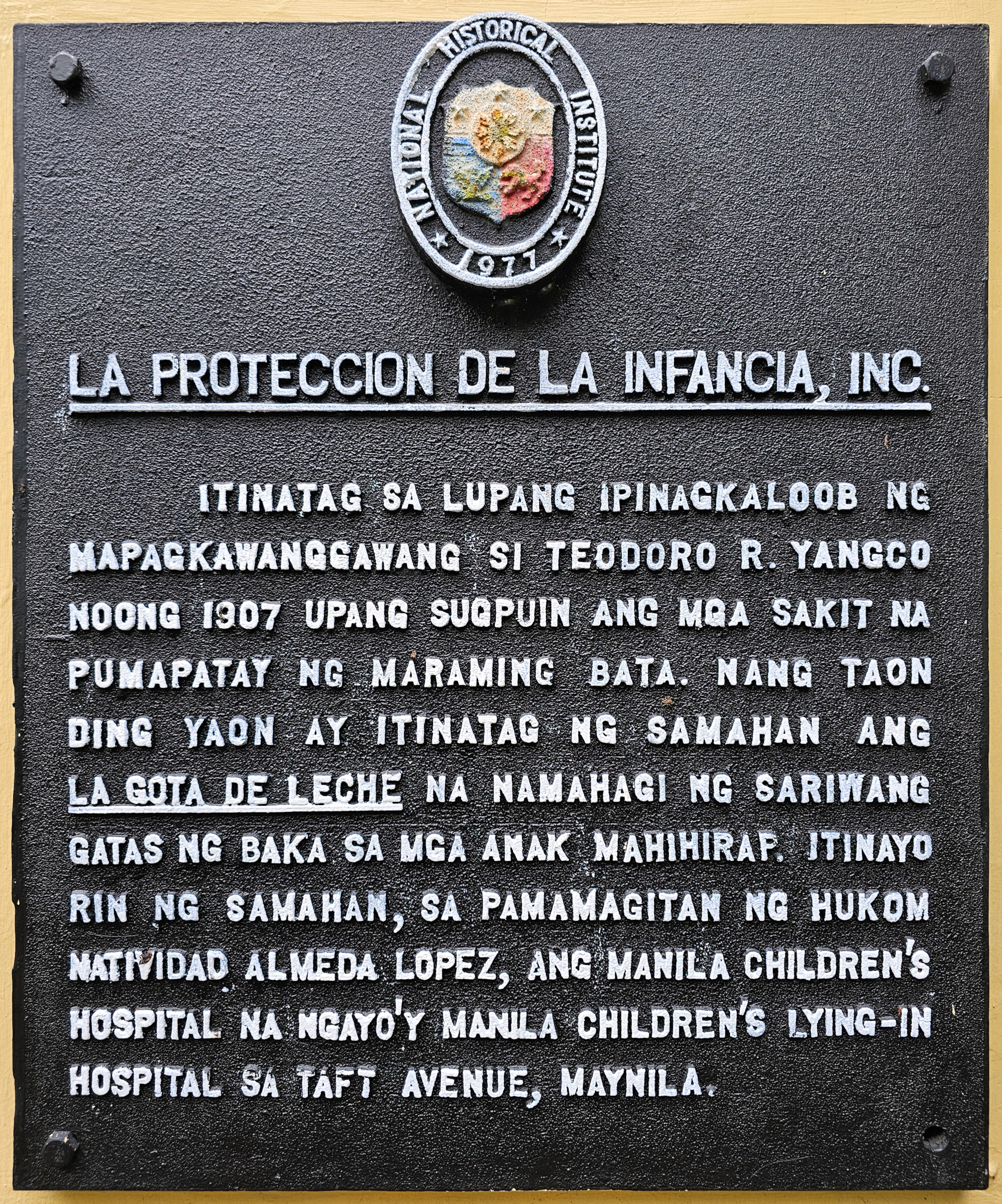
National historical marker installed in 1977 to commemorate La Proteccion de la Infancia

La Protección de la Infancia Inc. opened Gota de Leche, the brainchild of Dr. Calderon, who was inspired after witnessing the noble act of the organization.

Initially headquartered on Calle San Pedro (now Evangelista Street) in Santa Cruz near Plaza Miranda, the society moved to its present location in Sampaloc upon the completion of the Gota de Leche Building in 1917.

Gota de Leche continues its charitable activities. It still provides nutritional and medical assistance to qualified Filipino mothers and children while closely monitoring their improvement. This landmark building also houses the first national center for women’s rights that provides counselling services. Other services include dental assistance, educating families on common illnesses, and playing educational games with the children.

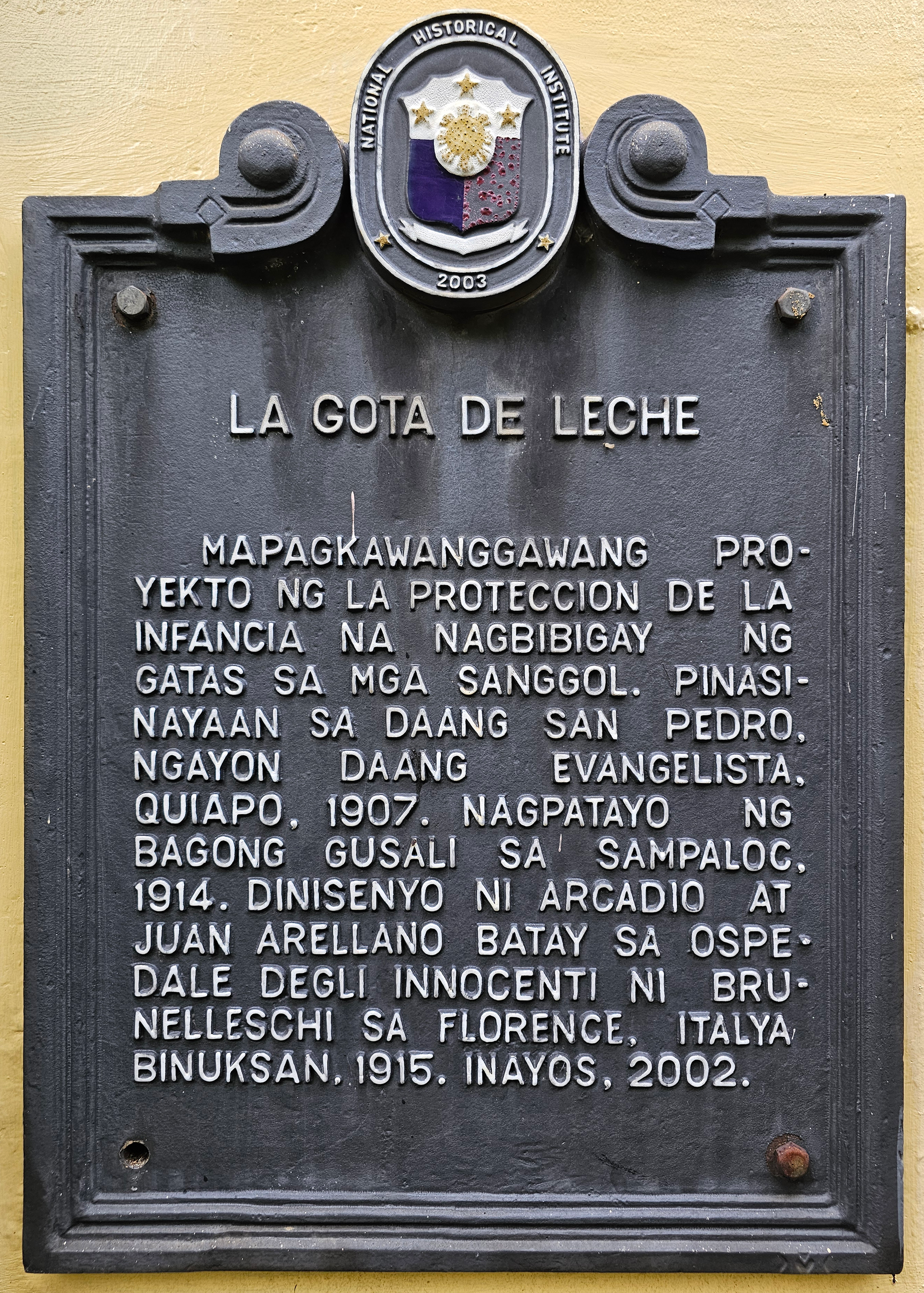
National historical marker installed in 2003 to commemorate the project and the building

Gota de Leche has also started their Brown Rice program, for impoverished families ensuring access to complementary food rations for both mother and child. Volunteers come and provide information on diet and keeping healthy to their parents.

In the wake of the recent disaster caused by Typhoon Yolanda, the institution has also opened its doors, literally, to those displaced by the typhoon.

The careful restoration of Gota de Leche established the importance of heritage structures and the value of historical buildings as an alternative to demolition.
