= List of burial places of presidents and vice presidents of the Philippines =

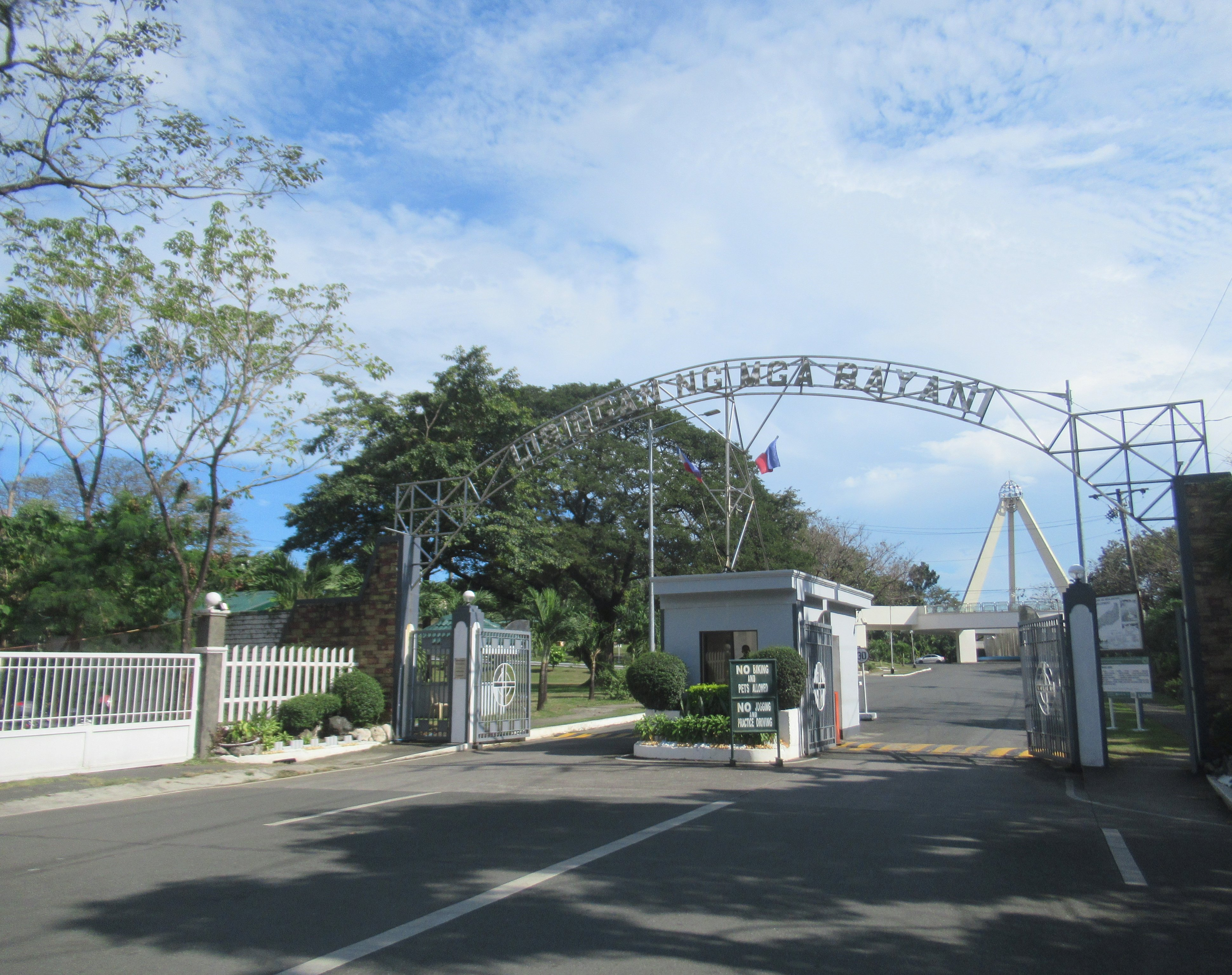
The Libingan ng mga Bayani in Taguig serves as the final resting place of five presidents of the Philippines.

The burial places of presidents and vice Presidents of the Philippines are located across three provinces and four cities within the National Capital Region. To date, 17 individuals have served as President of the Philippines, 13 of whom have died. The city of Taguig, home to the Libingan ng mga Bayani, is where the greatest number of presidents (and one vice president) are buried. Fifteen individuals have served as Vice President of the Philippines, seven of whom have died, including four who later became president. In total, 16 individuals who held either office have died.

== Presidential burial places ==
No.	President	Date of death	Burial place	City and province	Site image
1	Emilio Aguinaldo	February 6, 1964	Aguinaldo Shrine	Kawit, Cavite	
2	Manuel L. Quezon	August 1, 1944	Quezon Memorial Shrine (Note: Interred at this site on August 1, 1979, after initially being interred in the Arlington National Cemetery and Manila North Cemetery.)	Quezon City	
3	Jose P. Laurel	November 6, 1959	Tanauan City Public Cemetery	Tanauan, Batangas	
4	Sergio Osmeña	October 19, 1961	Manila North Cemetery	Manila	
5	Manuel Roxas	April 15, 1948	Manila North Cemetery	Manila	
6	Elpidio Quirino	February 29, 1956	Libingan ng mga Bayani (Note: Interred at this site on February 29, 2016, after initially being interred in the Manila South Cemetery.)	Taguig	
7	Ramon Magsaysay	March 17, 1957	Manila North Cemetery	Manila	
8	Carlos P. Garcia	June 14, 1971	Libingan ng mga Bayani	Taguig	
9	Diosdado Macapagal	April 21, 1997	Libingan ng mga Bayani	Taguig	
10	Ferdinand Marcos	September 28, 1989	Libingan ng mga Bayani (Note: Interred at this site on November 18, 2016, after initially being interred in the Byodo-In Temple and the Ferdinand E. Marcos Presidential Center.)	Taguig	
11	Corazon Aquino	August 1, 2009	Manila Memorial Park – Sucat	Parañaque	
12	Fidel V. Ramos	July 31, 2022	Libingan ng mga Bayani	Taguig	
15	Benigno Aquino III	June 24, 2021	Manila Memorial Park – Sucat	Parañaque	

=== Future presidential burial places ===
Former president Joseph Estrada plans that his remains will be buried in the grounds of the Joseph Ejercito Estrada Museum and Archives in Tanay, Rizal. This was revealed by his son, Jinggoy Estrada, in a YouTube video in 2020. The burial place was built near a rock where the former president frequently prays in his former resthouse, which became the location of his house arrest after his presidency.

== Vice presidential burial places ==
No.	Vice President	Date of death	Burial place	City and province	Site image
1	Sergio Osmeña	October 19, 1961	Manila North Cemetery	Manila	
2	Elpidio Quirino	February 29, 1956	Libingan ng mga Bayani (Note: Interred at this site on February 29, 2016, after initially being interred in the Manila South Cemetery.)	Taguig	
3/7 (Note: Fernando Lopez served two non-consecutive terms as vice president (under Elpidio Quirino from 1949 to 1953, and under Ferdinand Marcos from 1965 to 1972). He is officially recognized as both the third and seventh Vice President of the Philippines.)	Fernando Lopez	May 26, 1993	Lopez Family Cemetery	Jaro, Iloilo City	
4	Carlos P. Garcia	June 14, 1971	Libingan ng mga Bayani	Taguig	
5	Diosdado Macapagal	April 21, 1997	Libingan ng mga Bayani	Taguig	
6	Emmanuel Pelaez	July 27, 2003	Unknown		
8	Salvador Laurel	January 27, 2004	Libingan ng mga Bayani	Taguig	

== See also ==
- Burial of Ferdinand Marcos
