= Death of River Nasino =

2020 incident in Manila, Philippines

- Date: October 9, 2020
- Cause: Acute respiratory distress syndrome
- Burial: October 16, 2020; Manila North Cemetery

River Nasino (July 1, 2020 – October 9, 2020) was a 3-month-old Filipino girl who died in a Manila hospital after suffering from acute respiratory distress syndrome while her mother Reina Mae Nasino was detained for illegal possession of firearms and explosives. The baby's death sparked condemnation from progressive groups due to the police handling involved during the baby's funeral and burial.

== Background ==
The 23-year-old pregnant human rights worker Reina Mae Nasino and two other activists were arrested at Tondo, Manila on November 5, 2019, and detained at the Manila City Jail for illegal possession of firearms and explosives, a non-bailable offense. However, the detainees' lawyers asserted that the firearms and other weapons were planted. During the custody, River Nasino was born prematurely on July 1, 2020, at the Dr. Jose Fabella Memorial Hospital and was later diagnosed with acute gastroenteritis. Reina pleaded that the baby should be allowed stay by her side until at least six months old. Despite this, the baby was forcibly separated on August 13, 2020, despite the pleas that the baby was not healthy to separate a breastfeeding infant from her mother. A month later, River was brought to the hospital after she had shown signs of COVID-19; she tested negative for the virus. She died on October 9, 2020. At the day of the baby's death, her mother asked to the court to let her see her daughter.

== Funeral ==
The Manila Regional Trial Court only gave Nasino a six-hour furlough (three hours for the wake and another three hours for the burial), which was reduced from three days, to allow her to visit her daughter's funeral. The funeral of River was held on October 14, 2020, at the La Funeraria Rey in Pandacan, where police had deployed 20 personnel, as well as SWAT members. Reina Nasino visited the wake of her daughter, wearing full personal protective equipment (PPE) while handcuffed. Only the family members were allowed inside the wake. Nasino was also caught in the video begging on her knees before the police to allow the procession to start at 11:30 am, an hour before Nasino's three-hour furlough would start. In addition, the police barred progressive groups from holding protest placards outside the funeral home. However, tension arose when the police escorts prevented the media from interviewing her. A video from CNN Philippines showing the Chevrolet Suburban hearse carrying River's remains sped up during the procession, leaving the relatives behind. The police denied the allegations of maltreatment, saying that the deployment of personnel was to ensure the safety of the detainee.

It was reported that 43 police personnel were deployed for the burial of the baby. During the burial of the baby at the Manila North Cemetery, Nasino's parents and lawyers pleaded with the police to remove her handcuffs so she could hug the coffin for the last time but the police refused. The mother of the detainee, Marites Asis, expressed her displeasure over what happened at the burial as they were forced to run after the hearse after it had sped up.

In the aftermath, the Nasino family planned to file a case against the personnel of the Bureau of Jail Management and Penology and the Philippine National Police (PNP) for the "grotesque and barbaric" act against the detainee.

== Later events ==
=== Voiding of search warrant ===
The Court of Appeals, in a decision promulgated on August 31, 2022, granted the petition filed by Reina Mae Nasino and two fellow activists, nullifying the search warrants issued by the Manila and Quezon City Regional Trial Courts that led to their arrest, citing the failure to meet the standards.

After three years of detention, the three were ordered released on bail in December.

They had filed for dismissal of charges of illegal possession of firearms and explosives, arguing that they can no longer be prosecuted.

=== Acquittal of Reina Mae Nasino ===
They were acquitted by the Manila RTC Branch 47 through a decision dated July 17, 2023, but made public only ten days later, which also granted their joint motion for reconsideration against a court order in June that denied their demurrer to evidence.

== Reactions ==
On October 15, 2020, The College Editors Guild of the Philippines denounced the treatment of Reina Nasino and held the Duterte government liable for depriving her of her "right to free expression".

Hashtags #JusticeForBabyRiver and #FreeReinaMaeNasino, as well as #OustDuterteNOW trended on Twitter on October 16, 2020, in response to the police handling of the burial. Militant mass organizations Anakbayan and Gabriela strongly condemned the police handling of River's funeral, the latter calling it a "brutal takeover", while activist group Karapatan blamed the Duterte administration for the baby's death and slammed the reduction of her furlough, calling it "gross injustice and heartless". Carlos Conde of the Human Rights Watch also condemned the baby's death, denouncing it as a "new, unconscionable low" for the Philippine government. The Philippine Commission on Human Rights (CHR) expressed concern with how the Philippine government was handling the case. The CHR said it was investigating allegations that Reina Mae Nasino was being harassed because of her human rights work.

Vice President Leni Robredo also expressed sympathy over the death of the baby, noting that the police presence at the funeral was "overkill". Local celebrities Anne Curtis, her sister Jasmine Curtis-Smith, Bianca Gonzalez, and director Antoinette Jadaone also condemned the police handling at the burial. Justice Secretary Menardo Guevarra said that the case against the detained activist will proceed, adding that the department "sympathize with the accused for her personal loss". Migrante International called for the justice of the baby and the release of the detainee. Human rights lawyer Chel Diokno on his Twitter account also denounced the actions of the police, noting that despite the law, what had transpired to both Reina and River was "cruel". Renato Reyes Jr. of Bayan reacted on the burial, stating that "we will never forget this."

On October 18, 2020, Metropolitan Manila Development Authority (MMDA) spokesperson Celine Pialago, through her Facebook account, said that Nasino's supporters "should scrutinize who the detained activist is" and added that the public support for the grieving activist was a "drama serye" (transl. "drama series"). However, Pialago's statement sparked outrage from social media for "disrespect" and "zero empathy" towards the grieving mother and her baby.

On October 23, 2020, the International Coalition for Human Rights in the Philippines (ICHRP) said that the Philippine government's alleged maltreatment of Reina Mae and River Nasino could constitute violations of international standards on prisoners and children. The ICHRP noted how Reina Mae Nasino was separated from her baby and how the mother was prevented from seeing her the baby when it got sick.
