= Gota de Leche Building =

Cultural heritage site in Manila

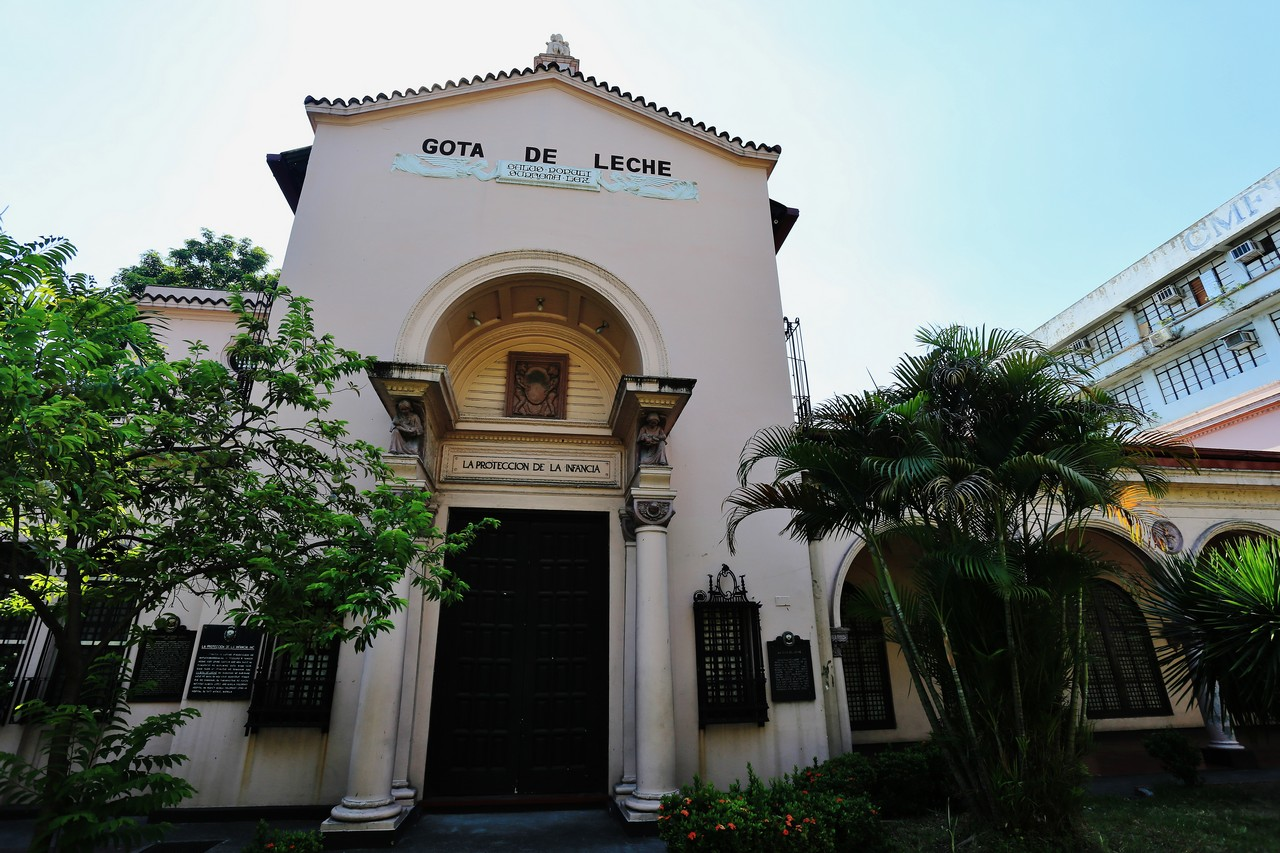
- Façade
- Interactive map of the Gota de Leche Building area

General information
- Status: Completed
- Architectural style: Spanish Colonial Revival
- Location: Sampaloc, Manila, Philippines
- Coordinates: 14.6028°N 120.9885°E
- Current tenants: Gota de Leche
- Groundbreaking: 1914
- Completed: 1915
- Renovated: 2002

Technical details
- Floor count: 2

Design and construction
- Architects: Arcadio Arellano; Juan Arellano
- Designations: Important Cultural Property (National Museum of the Philippines; August 2014)

Renovating team
- Architect: Augusto Villalon
- Other designers: Liliane Rejante Manahan (wall finishing consultant)

The Gota de Leche Building is a heritage site located in Sampaloc, Manila, Philippines. It was designated as an Important Cultural Property by the National Museum of the Philippines in August 2014. The cultural heritage site was named an Honourable Mention in the 2003 UNESCO Asia Pacific Heritage Awards.

== Architecture and design ==
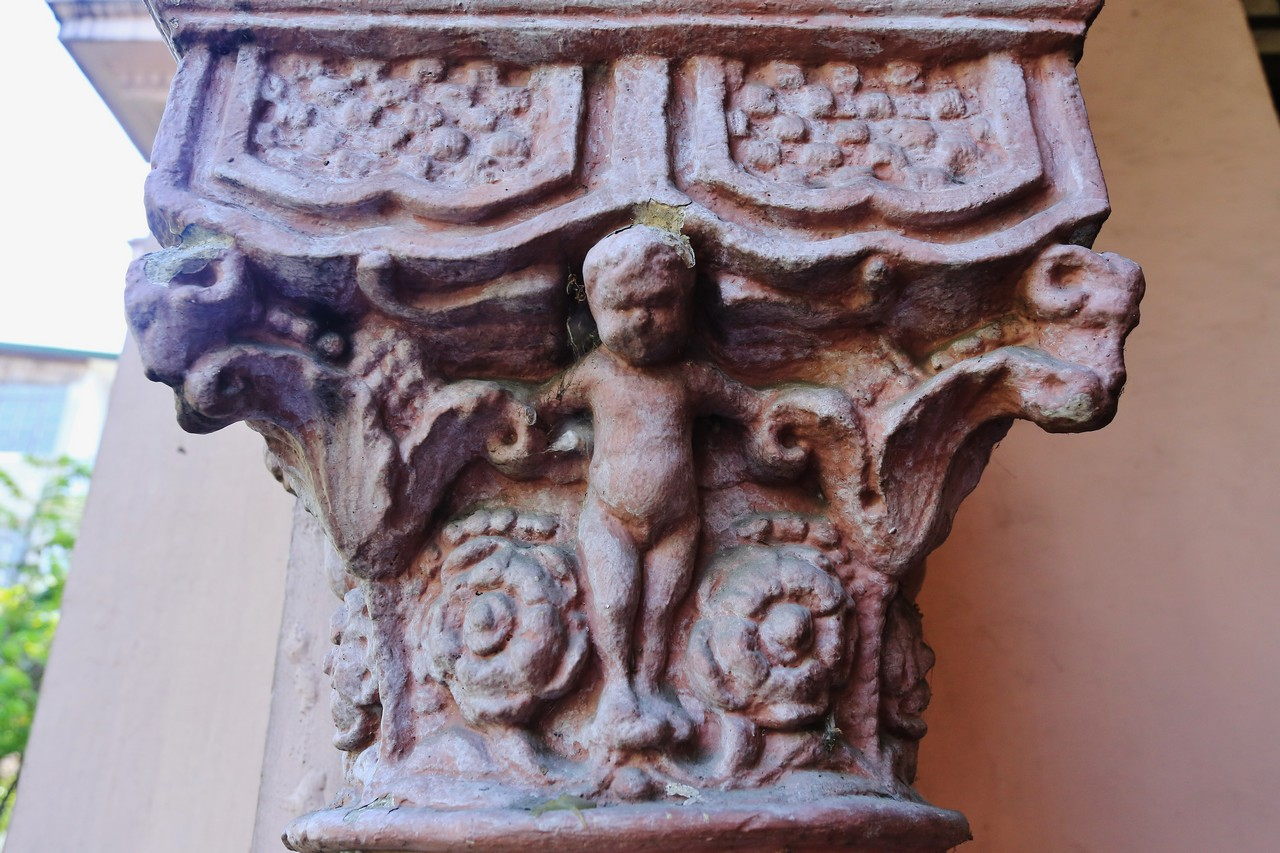
Column detail

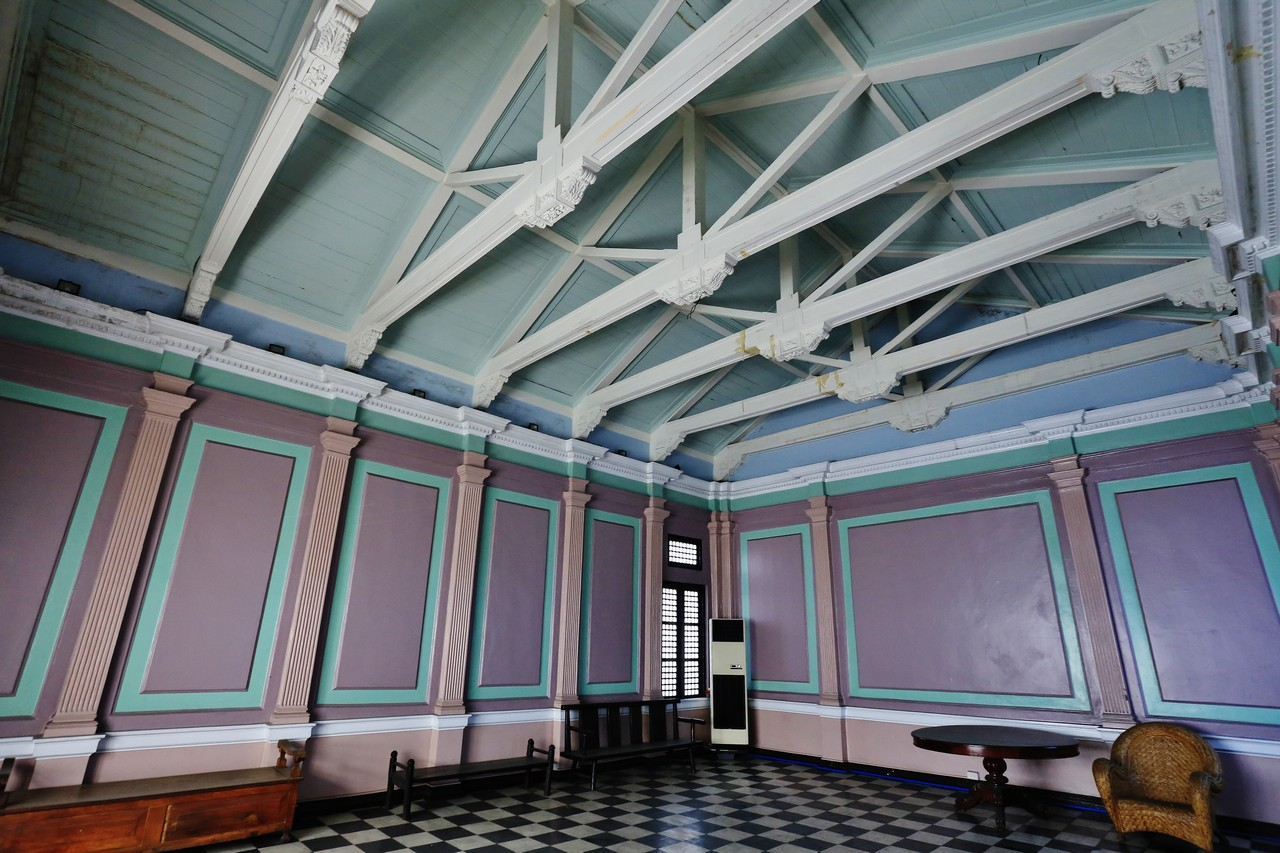
Gota de Leche Second Floor

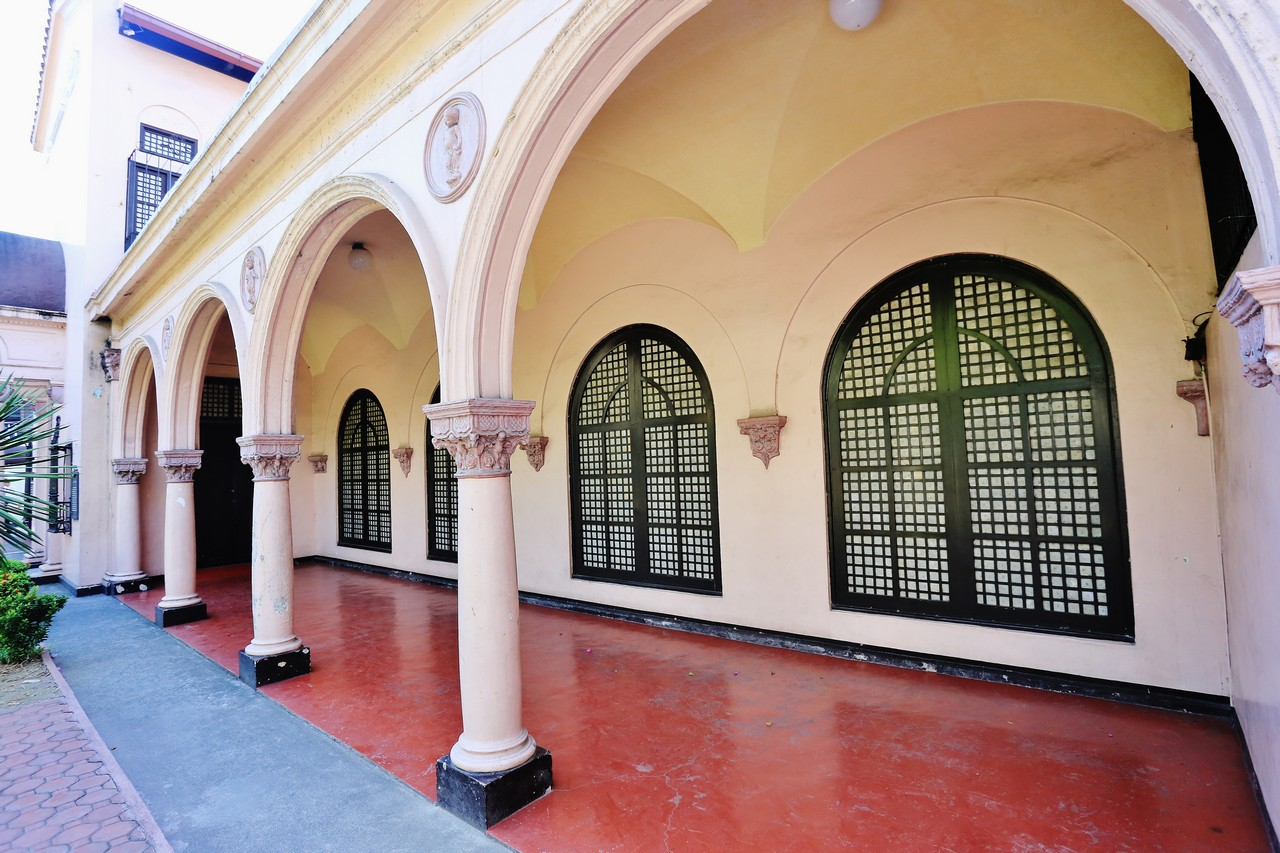
Portico

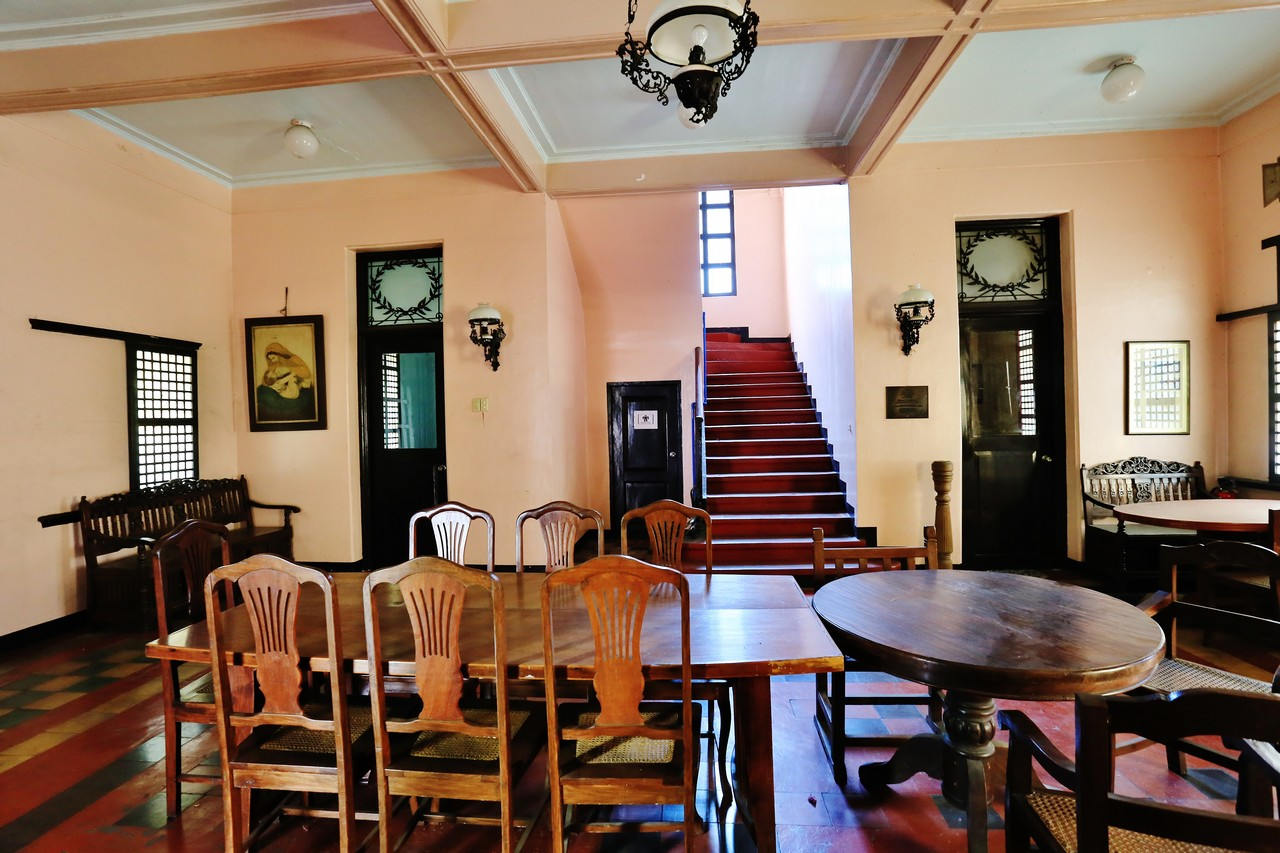
Interior

Architect Arcadio Arellano, with help from his brother Juan Arellano, was responsible for the design of the two-storey Gota de Leche Building located in S. Loyola Street. The building's construction started in 1914, and was opened in 1915. It and was constructed out of brick masonry. The structure features a series of adjoining arches with glazed terracotta spandrels that acts as a corridor or a veranda that effectively provides shades to the large windows. In addition, a tall arched doorway serves as the main entrance with images of infants as adornments. A simple fountain with a statue can be found on the front yard.

The Ospedale degli Innocenti, an orphanage in Florence, Italy which was considered as the first renaissance building in Europe, was the inspiration for the architecture Gota de Leche Building. The Gota de Leche's design has been cited as exceptional and a successful adaptation of Spanish Colonial architecture that is well suited to the Spanish influence in the Philippines.

=== Restoration ===
The building inevitably showed significant deterioration and soon needed repairs or reconstructions. It was fortunate to have survived World War II as its foundation and structural system remained in good condition.

The location of Gota de Leche has been a target of real estate developers as the land values became higher. And while most heritage buildings in the area were being demolished, owners of Gota de Leche firmly decided to restore the building to its original condition.

Under the supervision of architect Augusto Villalon and Liliane Rejante Manahan acting as wall finishing consultant, the restoration project for the Gota de Leche building was constructed on the principle of authenticity. They removed changes added to the building to bring it back to its original appearance, which meant tearing down an annex built on the southern end of the building and a few more structures constructed to act as classrooms to a nearby university during the 1950s. The removal of these structures restored view from the streets to the heritage building and also provided access of vehicles to the rear parking area. Landscape for the front garden was also restored.

During the 1950s, there were changes made inside the building for the installation of air condition units so the ceilings had to be dropped for this purpose. These changes were removed during the restoration project, including the replacement of the full mezzanine located on the ground floor with one that is only half the area. One can now see the completely intact original wooden ceilings, mouldings, carvings, and exposed truss work.

Almost all of the materials used during the original construction were still available in the Philippines during the restoration process. Consequently, several materials were the same as the original. The capiz (Placuna placenta) that were used for the windows were not available in Manila so they sourced it from Albay, a province in South Luzon, where the traditional skills and raw materials still exist. Construction skills were also closely monitored and workers were trained as regards the conservation process.

The Gota de Leche building restoration has been completed in 2002 and has been cited as an outstanding example of heritage conservation, receiving an honorable mention from UNESCO in the 2003 Asia-Pacific Heritage Awards. It has also established the importance of heritage structures and their importance as an alternative to destruction.
