= Trinidad Tecson =

Filipino revolutionary

Trinidad Perez Tecson
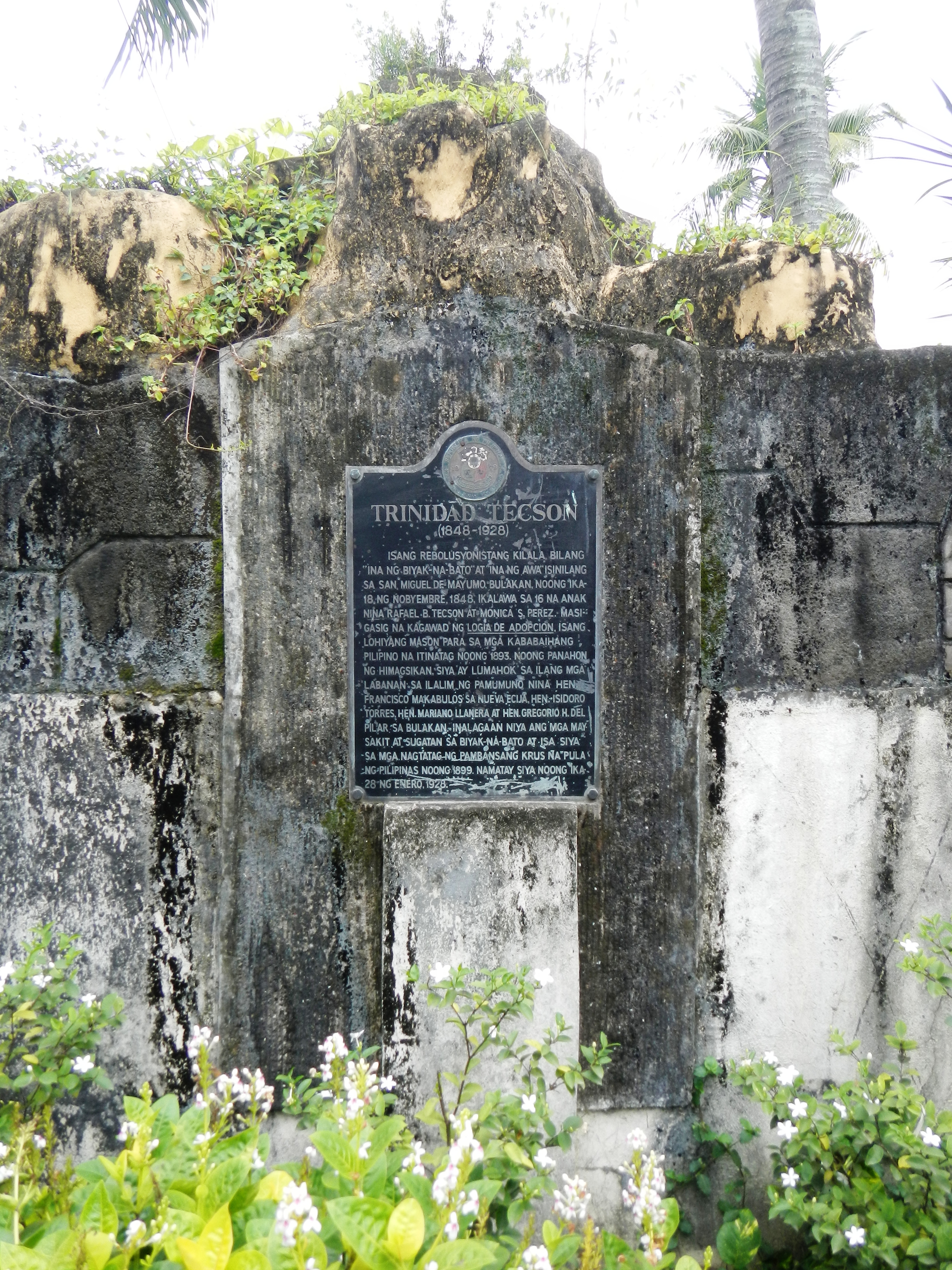
- Historical marker, Santa Rita Bata, San Miguel, Bulacan
- Born: November 18, 1848; San Miguel de Mayumo, Bulacan, Captaincy General of the Philippines
- Died: January 28, 1928 (aged 79); Ermita, Manila, Philippine Islands
- Resting place: Manila North Cemetery
- Known for: Philippine Revolution founder of Philippine National Red Cross
- Political party: Katipunan

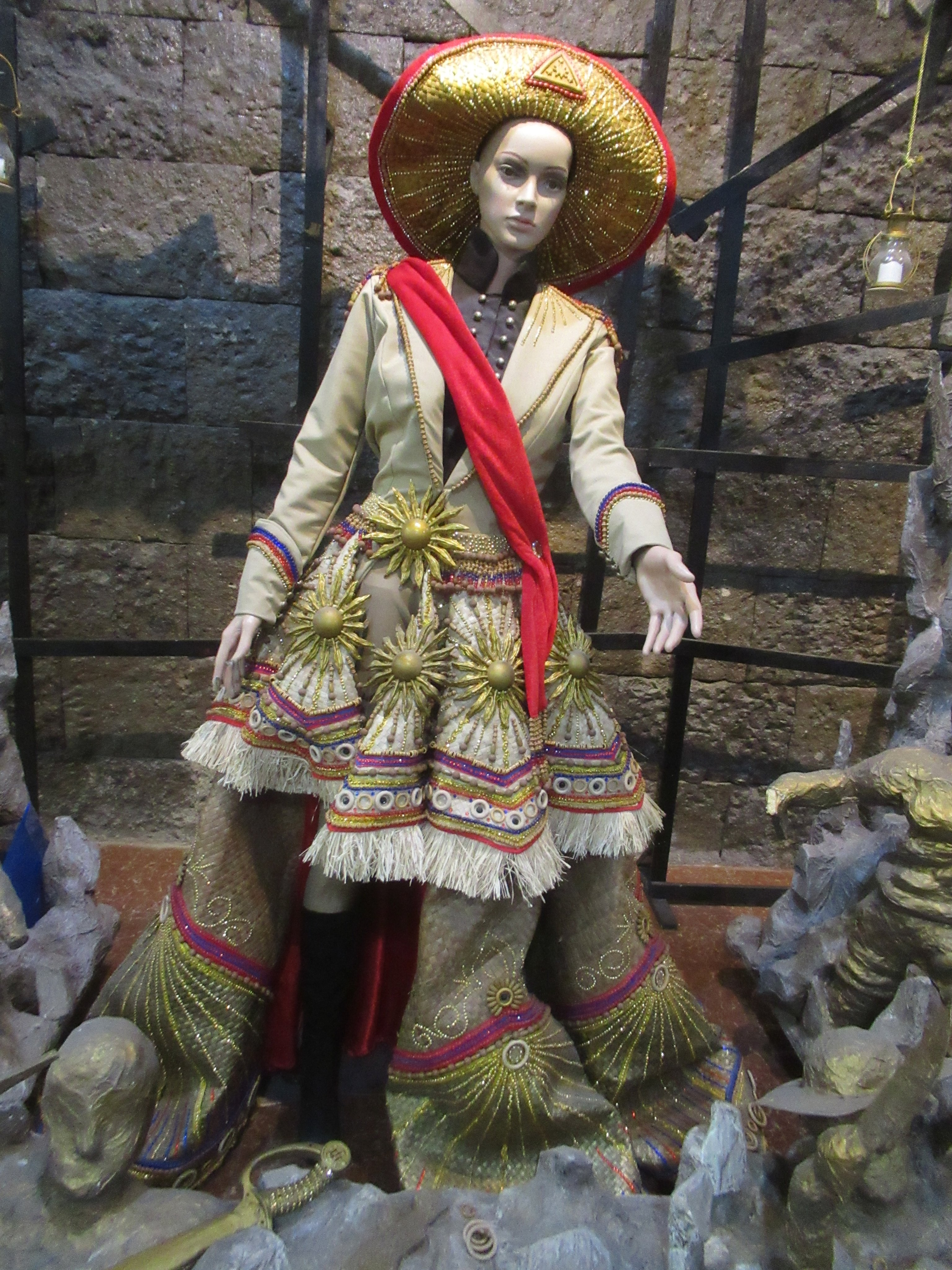
Tecson at the Hiyas ng Bulacan Museum

Trinidad Perez Tecson (November 18, 1848 – January 28, 1928), known as the "Mother of Biak-na-Bato" and "Mother of Mercy", fought to gain Philippines independence.

She was given the title "Mother of Biak-na-Bato" by Gen. Emilio Aguinaldo and served as its nurse and combatant. She was also cited as the "Mother of the Philippine National Red Cross" for her service to her fellow Katipuneros.

== Early life ==
Tecson was born in San Miguel de Mayumo, Bulacan, one of sixteen children of Rafael Tecson and Monica Perez. She learned to read and write from schoolmaster Quinto. She practiced fencing with Juan Zeto and was feared throughout the province, called "Tangkad" (tall) by her peers. Orphaned at a very young age, she stopped school and went with her siblings to live with relatives. She married at 19 and had two children, Sinforoso and Desiderio, who both died. Tecson and her husband were engaged in the purchase and sale of cattle, fish, oysters, and lobsters to be sold in Manila.

== Philippine-American War ==
She joined the revolutionary forces led by Gen. Gregorio del Pilar and participated in the assault on the province of Bulacan and Calumpit. She also served in the Malolos Republic and was designated as the Commissary of War. During the American drive northward, she was in Cabanatuan. Bringing with her sick and wounded revolutionaries, Tecson crossed the Zambales mountains to Santa Cruz then to Iba.

== Life after the war ==
After the war, her second husband died and she continued in business in Nueva Ecija, concentrating on selling meat in the towns of San Antonio and Talavera. She married her third husband, Doroteo Santiago, and after his death, married Francisco Empainado. On January 28, 1928, she died in Philippine General Hospital at age 79. Her remains lie in the Plot of the Veterans of the Revolution in Cementerio del Norte.
