= Rafael R. Roces Jr. =

Filipino journalist, writer, patriot, spy, and martyr

Rafael "Liling" Reyes Roces Jr. (October 12, 1912 – August 30, 1944) was a Filipino journalist, writer, patriot, World War II spy, hero, and martyr. He was the son of Rafael Filomeno Roces Sr. (the publishing house owner and proprietor of the Ideal Theater on Avenida Rizal in Manila, Philippines) and Inocencia "Enchay" Reyes. A Manileño, he studied at the Ateneo de Manila University.

Liling Roces married Leonor "Noring" Varona on January 13, 1937. He had two children, namely: Sylvia Roces-Montilla (born January 31, 1938) and Antonio Rafael "Tony" Roces. After his Roces's death, Leonor Varona later remarried with Aurelio Montinola Sr.

During the Japanese Occupation of the Philippines, Liling Roces spied for the American troops Commander George Rowe. After a SPYRON courier was caught by Japanese soldiers, he, among others, were suspected of providing information to George Rowe and Lt. Commander Charles "Chick" Parsons. He was imprisoned and tortured by the Kempeitai in Fort Santiago. On August 30, 1944, he, other prisoners, and twenty-three other members of the resistance were boarded onto a truck and brought to the Cementerio del Norte (North Cemetery) of Manila. Roces and his companions were beheaded and buried in one common ground.
