= Arcadio Arellano =

Filipino architect (1872–1920)

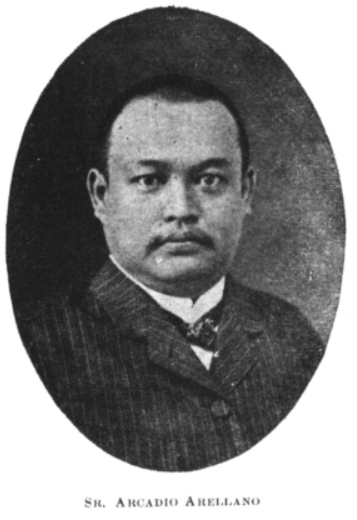
- Born: 13 November 1872; Tondo, Manila, Captaincy General of the Philippines
- Died: 20 April 1920 (aged 47); Manila, Philippine Islands
- Resting place: Manila North Cemetery
- Education: Ateneo Municipal de Manila
- Occupation: Architect
- Spouse: Amalia Ocampo
- Parent(s): Luis Arellano; Bartola de Guzman

Arcadio Arellano (13 November 1872 – 20 April 1920) was a Filipino architect who was considered a pioneer during his time. He built famous edifices and the residential buildings of the elite. In all his works, he departed from American and European designs and instead incorporated Filipino native plants and motifs.

== Early life and education ==
Arellano was born on 13 November 1872 in Tondo, Manila. He was the third child in a brood of fifteen children. His father, Luis Arellano, was a native of Bulakan, Bulacan and was a builder himself. The older Arellano built the Franciscan Church at Pinaglabanan, San Juan, and was also a consultant to Don Juan Hervas, the Spanish consulting architect, from 1887 to 1883. Arellano's mother was Bartola de Guzman. One of his uncles was Deodato Arellano, the propagandist and first president of the Katipunan.

He acquired his elementary education from schools in Tondo. In 1892, he received his Bachelor of Arts degree from the Ateneo Municipal de Manila. He took further courses in business and maestro de obras (construction foreman) from the Escuela de Artes y Oficios where he graduated in 1895.

== Involvement in the Philippine Revolution ==
Arellano served in the engineering corps and attained the rank of captain during the second stage of the Revolution. He was responsible for supervising the repairs made to the Malolos Convent in 1898. The Malolos Convent was used by the Revolutionary government during the Revolution.

== Government service during the American Regime ==
Arellano also supervised the assessments in Intramuros as ordered by the Schurman Commission. By 1901, he became technical director of general assessment for the whole city. He was also able to work closely with Governor W. H. Taft as his private consulting architect.

On 15 February 1907, he represented the district of Santa Cruz in the advisory board of Manila, holding the position until 1 July 1908. He was then appointed member of the municipal board on 8 May 1909 and stayed in the same position until the end of the year. He was appointed board member anew on 18 October 1913 until he resigned on 6 May 1915.

On 8 October 1915, he was tasked by the government to prepare the plans and specifications for the construction of a monument for the heroes of 1896 under Act 2494. He finished the project a year later.

Among the important ordinances he helped draft while being both adviser and councilman were the following:

- The punishment of gambling;
- Awarding of a prize to the inventor of an inexpensive fire-proof roofing material;
- Revision of the light and power rates; and,
- Recovery of lands along Tondo beach.

He took part in preparing the building code for Manila and worked with Sergio Osmeña in planning the construction of a monument for Filipino heroes.

== Known architectural works ==
Residential Buildings:

- Gregorio Araneta's home on R. Hidalgo Street
- Ariston Bautista's residence on Barbosa Street
- Gonzalo Tuazon's home

Commercial and Industrial Buildings

- “El 82”
- The former Hotel de Francia
- Carmelo & Bauermann building
- Gota de Leche Building on Lepanto Street
- Casino Español de Manila on Taft Avenue

Others

- Mausoleum of the Veterans of the Revolution
- Legarda Crypt at the Manila North Cemetery
- Various Buildings of Don Hilario Sunico of Binondo

== Affiliations ==
- Philippine Academy of Engineering, Architecture, and Land Surveying
- Club Popular
- Club Nacionalista
- Property Owners Association of Manila
- Philippine Chamber of Commerce
- Manila Merchants’ Association

== Personal life ==
Arellano was said to have been a well-dressed and well-groomed man who loved taking care of horses, hogs, and poultry. He also loved music and sang in a tenor voice. He collected paintings as well.

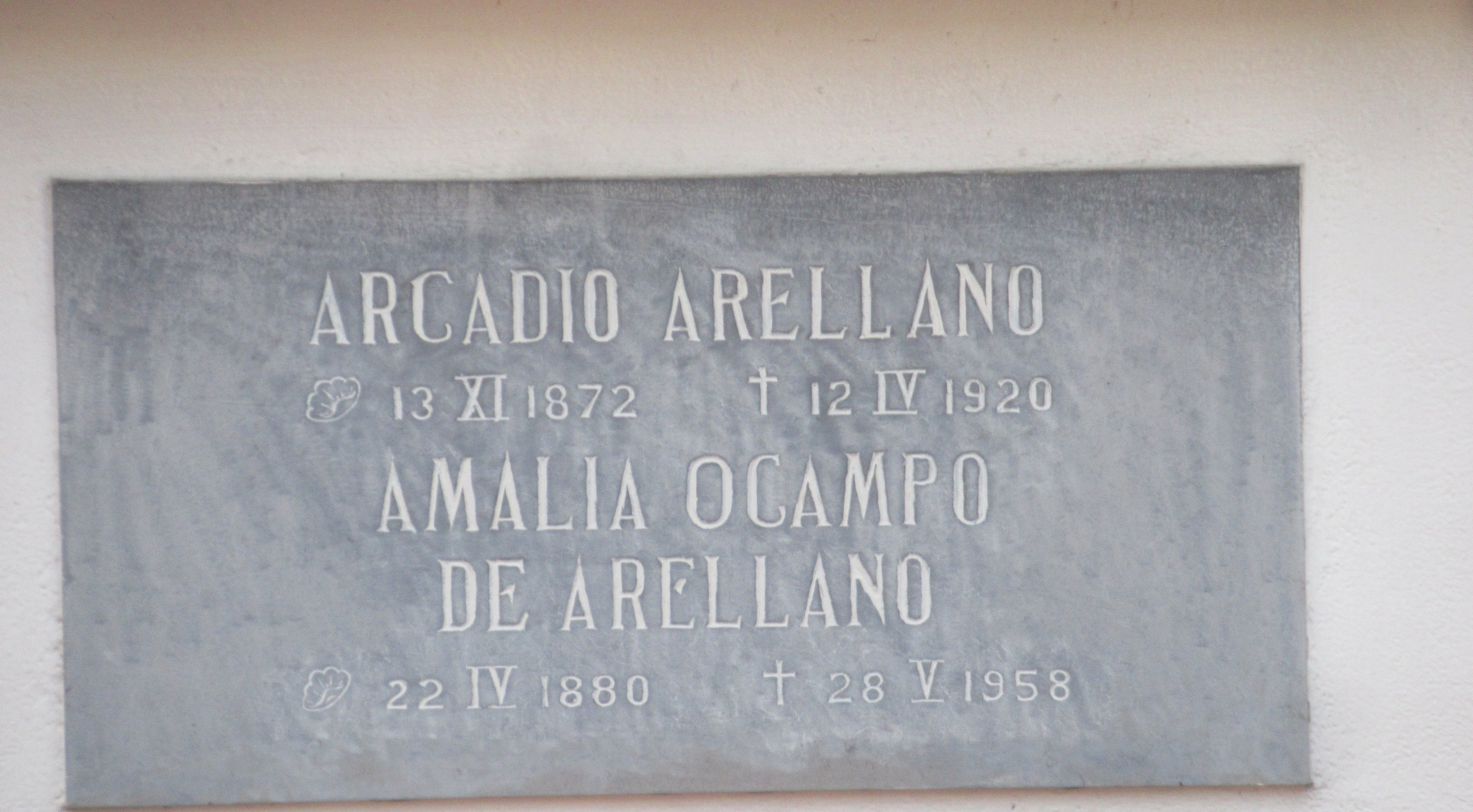
Arellano & Amalia Ocampo's graves at Manila North Cemetery.

He was married to Amalia Ocampo, daughter of Martin Ocampo, who was the owner of the publications El Renacimiento and Muling Pagsilang. They had nine children, namely: Luis, Araceli, Natividad, Irma, Friné, Arturo, Raul, Otilio, and Elsa.

== Death ==
Arellano died on 20 April 1920 in Manila, Philippines.
