= Manila North Cemetery =

Public cemetery in Manila, Philippines

- Entrance of the Manila North Cemetery
- Interactive map of Manila North Cemetery

Details
- Location: Santa Cruz, Manila
- Country: Philippines
- Coordinates: 14.633°N 120.989°E
- Type: Public
- Owned by: Manila City Government
- Size: 54 ha (130 acres)

The Manila North Cemetery (Spanish: Cementerio del Norte) is a 54 ha (130 acres) historic cemetery managed by the City of Manila, the capital city of the Philippines. It is one of the largest cemeteries in Metro Manila and is located at the northern fringes of the city. It is bordered by two other historic cemeteries: the La Loma Cemetery and the Manila Chinese Cemetery.

Numerous impoverished families notably inhabit some of the mausoleums.

== History and architecture ==
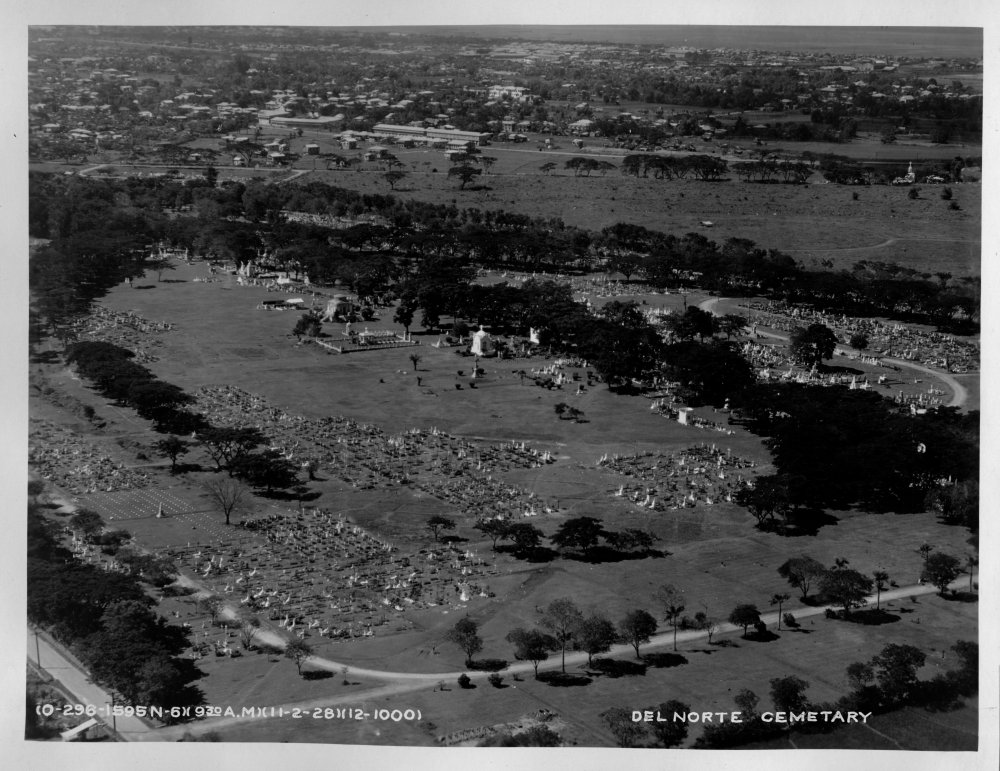
Aerial view of Cementerio del Norte (1928)

The Manila North Cemetery was formerly part of La Loma Cemetery but was separated as an exclusively Catholic burial ground. The cemetery formerly known as Cementerio del Norte was laid out in 1904.

The cemetery in its entirety was once called Paang Bundok, the area Jose Rizal selected as his final resting place. The current Paang Bundok is now a barangay located before the cemetery grounds.

During the Japanese occupation of the Philippines in World War II the cemetery became the site of atrocities, with accounts that Imperial Japanese forces led by General Tomoyuki Yamashita brutally killed more than 2,000 unarmed noncombatants in the cemetery from October to November 1944.

The cemetery being one of the oldest cemeteries in the metropolis is evident on the different designs of mausoleums that reflect the prevailing architectural style in the Philippines during the period they were constructed. The styles range from simple, plain-painted with a patch of greenery, to very complex designs that contain reliefs that are difficult to carve while also having different colors.

== Informal settlement ==
Around 6,000 informal settlers live inside the cemetery, and most of them serves as caretakers of the mausoleums where they also stay to survive. They often serve as informal tour guides, bringing visitors to tombs of famous people and discussing the oral history of the area. When the families or owners of the mausoleums come, especially during and after All Soul's Day, the families transfer to other places. Others take advantage of the quantity of visitors during the Allhallowtide holiday, setting up stalls to sell drinks and snacks, and providing visitors services such as renting out their toilets.

Clearing operations made in 2019 destroyed the shanties and other obstructions inside the cemetery, displacing the families who lived in the makeshift homes and in the mausoleums.

== Heritage structures ==
=== Mausoleum of the Veterans of the Revolution ===
Mausoleo de los Veteranos de la Revolución

The Mausoleum of the Veterans of the Revolution is a memorial dedicated to Filipino revolutionaries of the Philippine Revolution and the Philippine–American War.

=== Tuason-Legarda Family Mausoleum ===
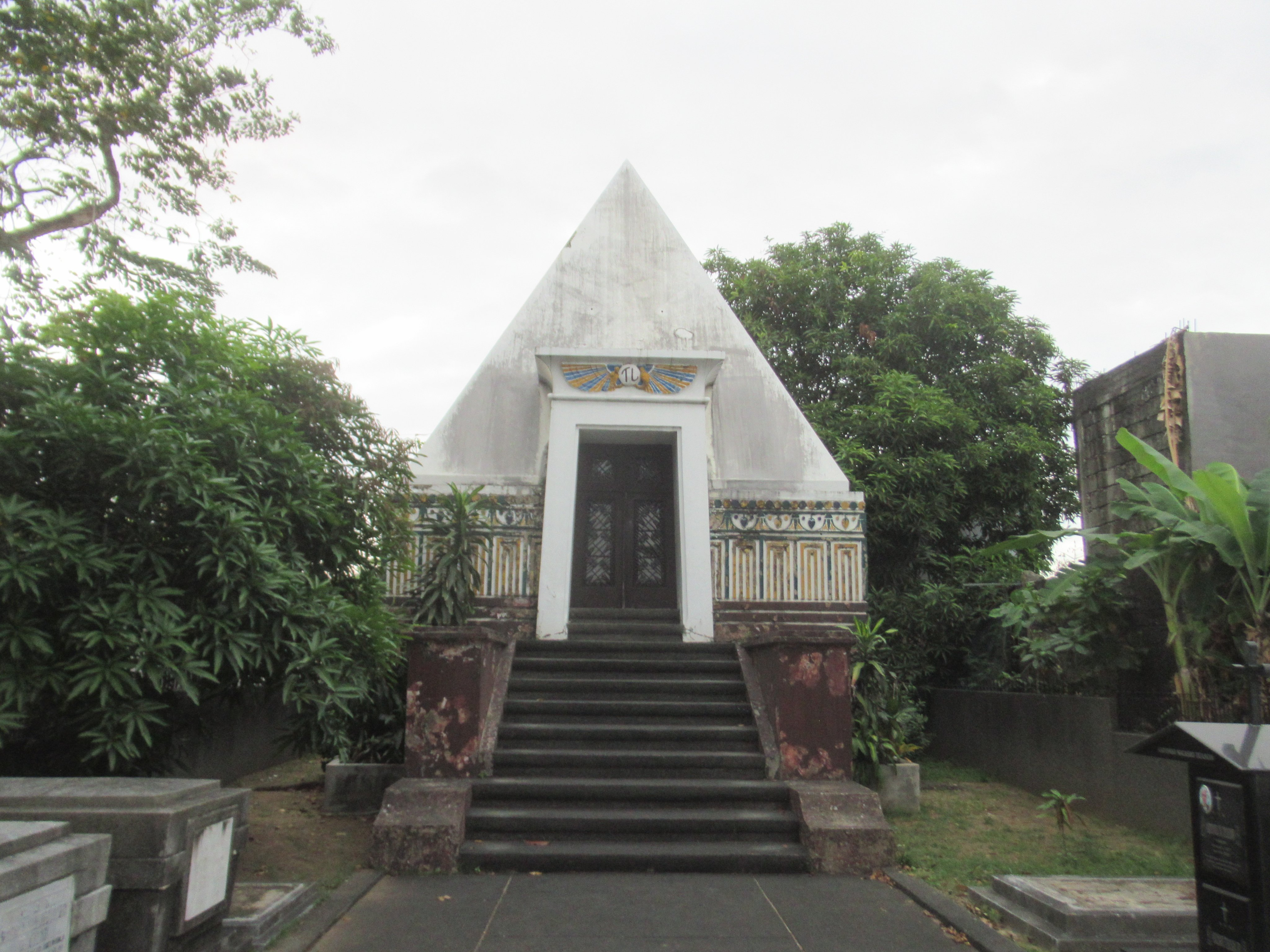
Tuason-Legarda Family Mausoleum

Completed in 1915, this mausoleum is noted for its Egyptian-inspired design, especially the two sphinxes found in its entrance. It is a collaborative work of brothers Arcadio and Juan Arellano. It is the final resting place of the ancestors and descendants of the Tuason-Legarda-Prieto-Valdes families.

=== Bautista-Nakpil Pylon ===
The Bautista-Nakpil Pylon at the North Cemetery was designed by Juan Nakpil as a tribute to both Bautista and Nakpil families, including his uncle and benefactor, Dr. Ariston Bautista. The funerary pylon is a tall, square podium which has four human figures on the top corners that form a gesture of prayer capping off the tall columns. The frontal side is embellished by geometricized flowers, spiraling foliage, and nautilus shells in low-relief concrete panels which has a highly decorated stoup on the lower portion. An octagonal lantern-like form sits on top of the podium with miniature columns buttressing on all sides and crowned by a rigid dome.

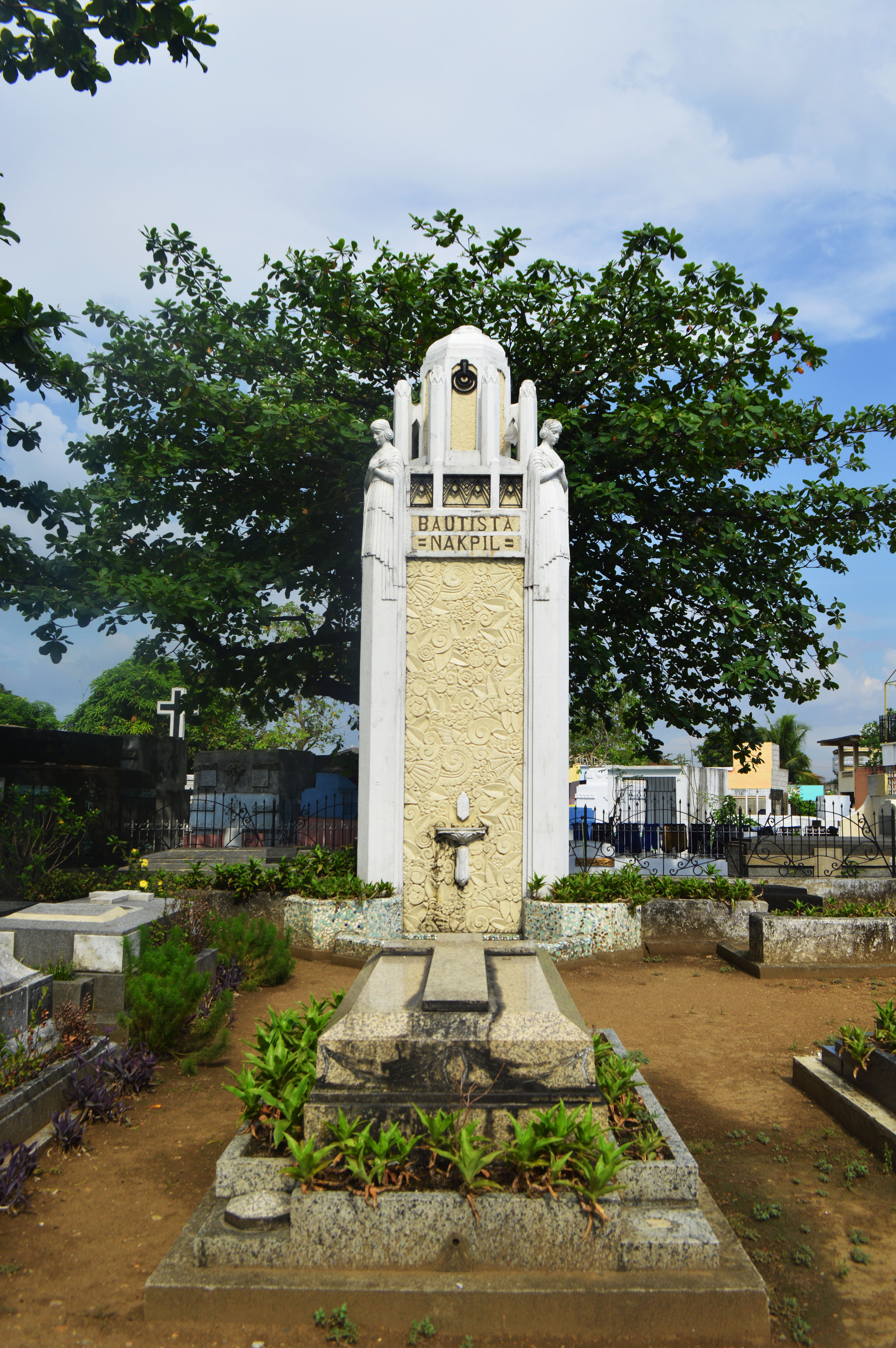
Bautista-Nakpil Pylon front view.

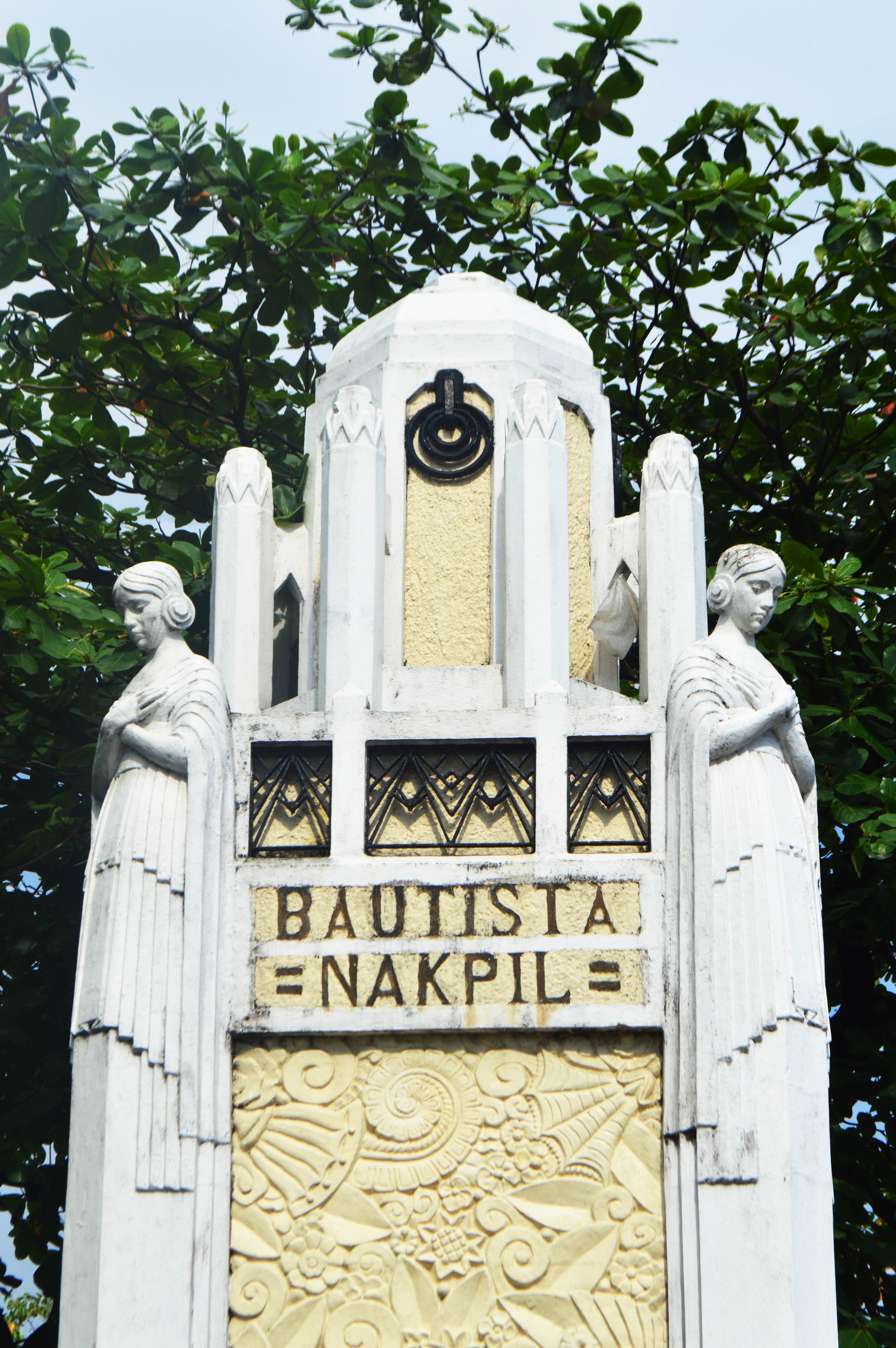
Art Deco design on the Bautista-Nakpil pylon.

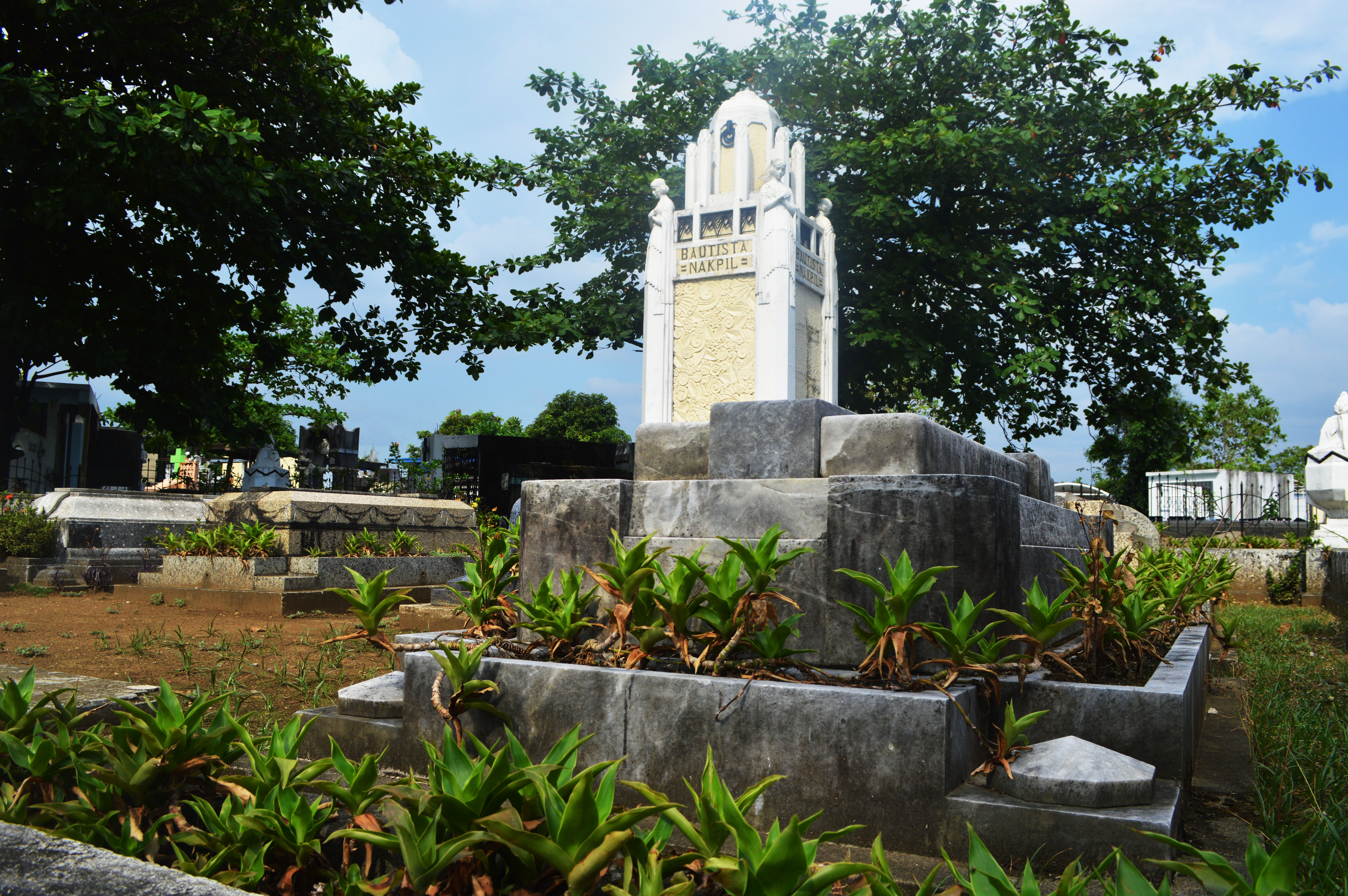
Bautista-Nakpil Pylon site.

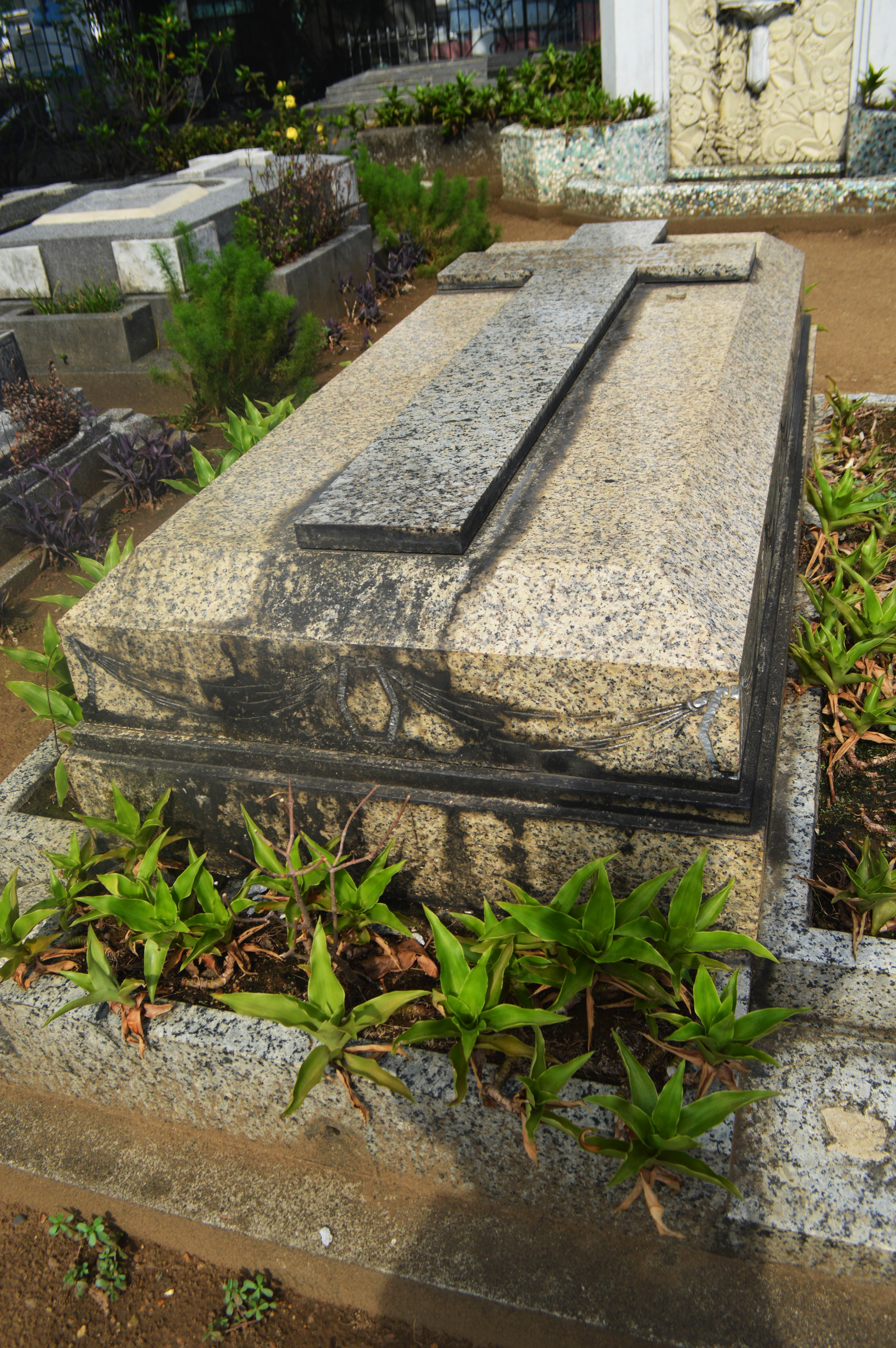
One of the graves at the Bautista-Nakpil Pylon site.

== Crematorium and columbarium ==
Manila North Cemetery Columbarium

On October 24, 2016, the Manila North Cemetery Columbarium was inaugurated. Construction started in February with a cost of ₱90 million. The four-storey columbarium has 5,000 square meters and can accommodate 4,088 niches while the crypt has 1,218 slots for coffins.

== Manila North Green Park ==
Manila North Green Park

A part of the cemetery became the Manila North Green Park, an extension of the Manila North Cemetery. It was developed through a joint-venture between the City of Manila and the CHC Development Consortium, Inc.

== Notable burials ==
The remains of key figures in Philippine history are buried in the cemetery. Most of the people have their tombs on the main avenue of the cemetery while other notable people are located near the main entrance. Some of them are:

- Arcadio Arellano (1872–1920), architect
- Ladislao Bonus (1854–1908), Father of the Philippine Opera
- José Corazón de Jesús (1896–1932), poet known as Huseng Batute. Lyricist of the famed protest anthem Bayan Ko
- Tomás Cloma (1904–1996), president of the Philippine Maritime Institute (now PMI Colleges). Interred in a mausoleum shaped like a ship, titled SS Last Voyage
- Mariano Jesús Cuenco (1888–1964), 4th President of the Senate of the Philippines
- Doña Narcisa Buencamino vda. de León (1877–1966), Founder and matriarch of LVN Pictures, Inc.
- Isauro Gabaldón (1875–1942), former senator and resident commissioner to the US Congress
- Francis Burton Harrison (1873–1957), former American governor-general
- Amado Hernández (1903–1970), labor leader, Philippine literary icon and National Artist for Literature
- Atang de la Rama-Hernández (1905–1991), wife of Amado, kundiman singer, actress, and National Artist for Theater and Music
- Félix Resurrección Hidalgo (1853–1913), painter
- Arsenio Lacson (1912–1962), former Manila mayor
- Alfredo Lim (1929–2020), former Manila mayor, NBI Director, DILG Secretary and senator
- Tomas Morato (1887–1965), mayor of Calauag, Quezon, then first appointed mayor of Quezon City. His wife Consuelo Eclavea Morato is also buried with him
- Julio Nalundasan (1894 –1935), former Ilocos Norte congressman allegedly assassinated by Ferdinand Marcos
- Román Ongpin (1847–1912), businessman, philanthropist, nationalist, and civic citizen
- Florentino Torres (1844-1927), 3rd Associate Justice of the Supreme Court of the Philippines
- Quintín Paredes (1884–1973), former House Speaker and senator
- José Ignacio Paua (1872–1926), Chinese-Filipino general who joined the Katipunan, a secret society that spearheaded the 1896 Philippine Revolution against the Spanish Empire. He later served in the Philippine Republican Army under General Emilio Aguinaldo.
- Carmen Planas (1914–1964), first woman to be elected to any public office in the Philippines, former Vice mayor and former councilor of Manila
- Claro M. Recto (1890–1960), former senator and Spanish-language author
- Saturnina Rizal Mercado de Hidalgo (1850–1913), sister of Jose Rizal. Interred in the Ver-Hidalgo-Rizal Mausoleum.
- Lucía Rizal (1857–1919), sister of José Rizal. Interred in the Herbosa Mausoleum.
- Owen Robyns-Owen, Chief Officer, British Merchant Navy (died: January 9, 1945, at the age of 67), is the only British Commonwealth war grave in the cemetery
- José E. Romero (1897–1978), former representative of Negros Oriental, senator, first Philippine ambassador to the United Kingdom, and Secretary of Education. His second wife, Elisa Zuñiga Villanueva (1910–1999), is also buried with him
- Epifanio de los Santos (1871–1928), historian and former statesman. EDSA is named after him
- Hilarión "Larry" Silva (1937–2004), comedian and politician
- Andrés Solomón (also known as "Tugo" or "Togo") (1905–1952), actor
- Trinidad Tecson (1848–1928), revolutionary nurse
- Lilian Velez (1924–1948), singer-actress of the mid and late 1940s and dubbed as the singing sweetheart of Philippine movies, who was murdered by her co-actor, Narding Anzures on June 26, 1948
- Pancho Villa (1901–1925), a boxer, the first Asian Flyweight World Champion
- Antonio Villegas (1928–1984), former Manila mayor. Formerly buried in Reno, Nevada
- Teodoro Yangco (1861–1939), former resident commissioner to the United States Congress and businessman for whom Yangco Market is named
- Joaquín "Buwaya" Fajardo (1940s–1991), actor
- Rodolfo Boy Garcia (1935–1997), actor
- Rod Navarro (1930–2003), actor
- Asiong Salonga (1924–1951), gangster
- Renato "Porky" Gomez (1948–2009), comedian
- Max Alvarado (1929–1997), actor
- Max Laurel (1944–2016), actor
- José Katigbak (1879–1916), engineer and first Filipino student of the renowned Harvard University in Cambridge, Massachusetts
- Patricia Mijares (1923–2012), actress
- Shalala (1960–2021), comedian and TV/radio personality
- Moody Díaz (1930s–1995), actress
- Víctor López Jr. (1950–1985), barangay chairman of Tondo, Manila
- Col. Joe Pring (1942–1994), police officer and biological father of actress Joyce Pring
- Fred Elizalde (1907–1979), musician, composer, conductor, bandleader and president of the Manila Broadcasting Company
- José Ma. Basa (1839–1907), patriot and propagandist
- Metring David (1920–2010), comedian
- Rudy Meyer (1937–2009), actor
- Bentot Sr. (1920–1986), actor
- Bentot Jr. (1970–2016), actor
- Chiquito (1932–1997), actor and comedian
- Robert Reyes Natividad (1941–2007), Singer, movie and television actor, famous for Aawitan kita
- Guillermo Masangkay (1867–1963), Friend and Adviser of Gat Andrés Bonifacio, One of the first member of Katipunan and revolutionary general in Filipino-American War. Buried in his family plot.
- Isidoro De Santos (1873-1939), patriot and former congressman
- River Nasino (2020), infant baby whose death, funeral, and burial caused controversy in the Philippines.
- Dr. Alberto I. Vasquez (1962–2021), Dentist
- Josefa V. Mendoza (1954–2020), Brgy. Chairwoman of Malate, Manila
- Misael "Boy" Gonzales, Jr. (1959–2026), veteran reporter and anchor of DZRH

Unmarked graves

- Macario Sakay (1878 –1907), Filipino Revolutionary General. Buried in an unmarked grave after his execution in the Old Bilibid Prisons.
- 28 victims of Asociacion De Damas De Filipinas fire tragedy on December 3, 1998. Buried in unmarked graves.

Group and Family plots

Mausoleo de los Veteranos de la Revolución

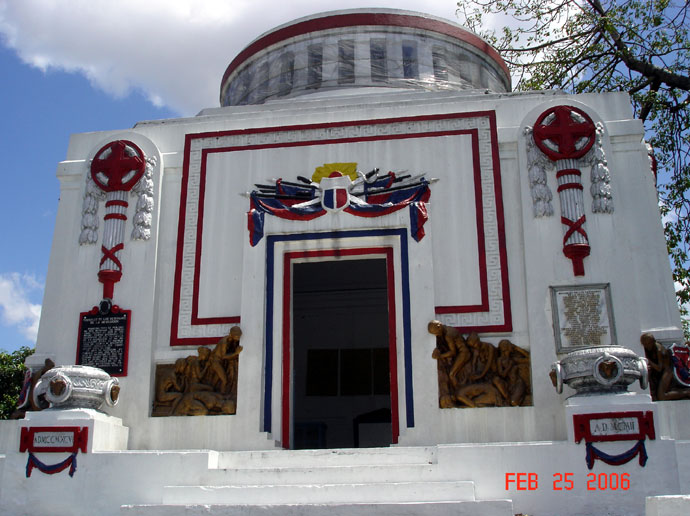
Mausoleo de los Veteranos de la Revolución

A memorial and national monument dedicated to Filipino revolutionaries of the Philippine Revolution of the 1890s and the Philippine–American War. Notable burials in this monument were:

- Juan Arevalo, patriot, son of Bonifacio Flores Arevalo, assembly member (Declaration of Philippine Independence, Cavite-Viejo, Province of Cavite, June 12, 1898)
- Adriano Hernández (1870–1925), Brigadier General of the Philippine Revolution and Military Strategist and the local hero of Dingle, Iloilo.
- Fernando Canon – Filipino revolutionary general, poet, inventor, engineer, musician
- Pío del Pilar (1865–1931), Philippine revolutionary figure.
- Justo Lukban (1863–1927), Major of the Philippine Revolution and the Philippine–American War. Member of the Malolos Congress. Third Mayor of Manila

29 Martyrs of World War II Memorial

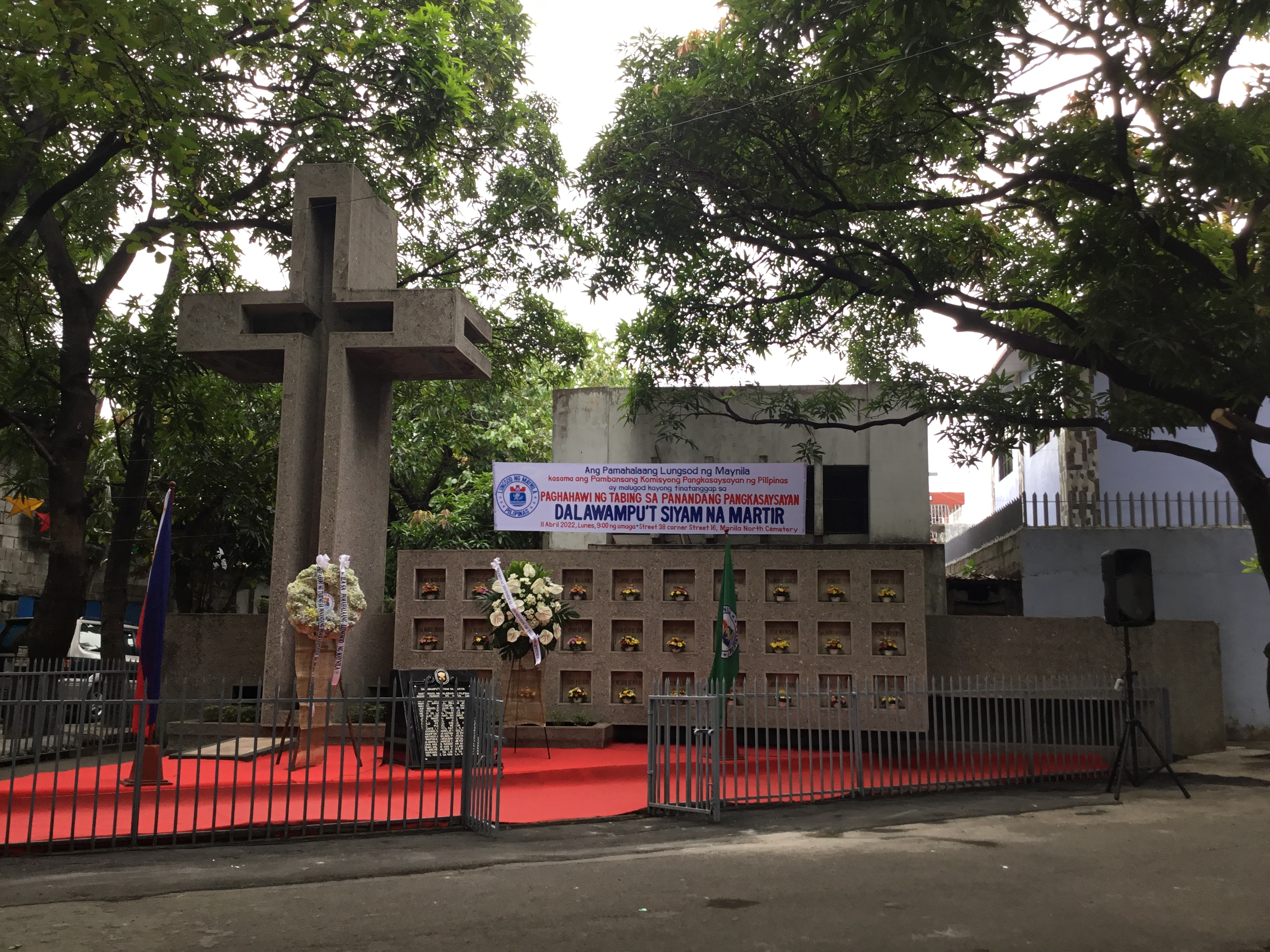
29 Martyrs of World War II Memorial

This memorial serves as the final resting place of twenty-nine Manila residents that the Japanese Army executed on August 30, 1944. The remains of the executed individuals were said to be located and identified by their compatriots after the war, after a Japanese-American officer (working in the Japanese Army as a spy), revealed what he had seen and the location of the grave after the executions. Their remains were interred in this mausoleum on March 9, 1947. Notable burials in this plot were:

- Manuel Arguilla (1911–1944), Ilokano writer in English, patriot, and martyr, known for his widely anthologized short story "How My Brother Leon Brought Home a Wife"
- José Fortich Ozámiz (1898–1944), former senator and first provincial governor of Misamis Occidental
- Rafael "Liling" R. Roces Jr. (1912–1944), Filipino journalist, writer, patriot, World War II spy, hero, and martyr

Osmeña Family Plot

- Sergio Osmeña (1878–1961), former 4th president of the Philippines.
- Esperanza Limjap-Osmeña (1894–1978), former First Lady of the Philippines

Roxas Family Plot

- Manuel A. Roxas (1892–1948), former 5th president of the Philippines
- Trinidad Roxas (1899–1995), former First Lady of the Philippines

Magsaysay Family Plot

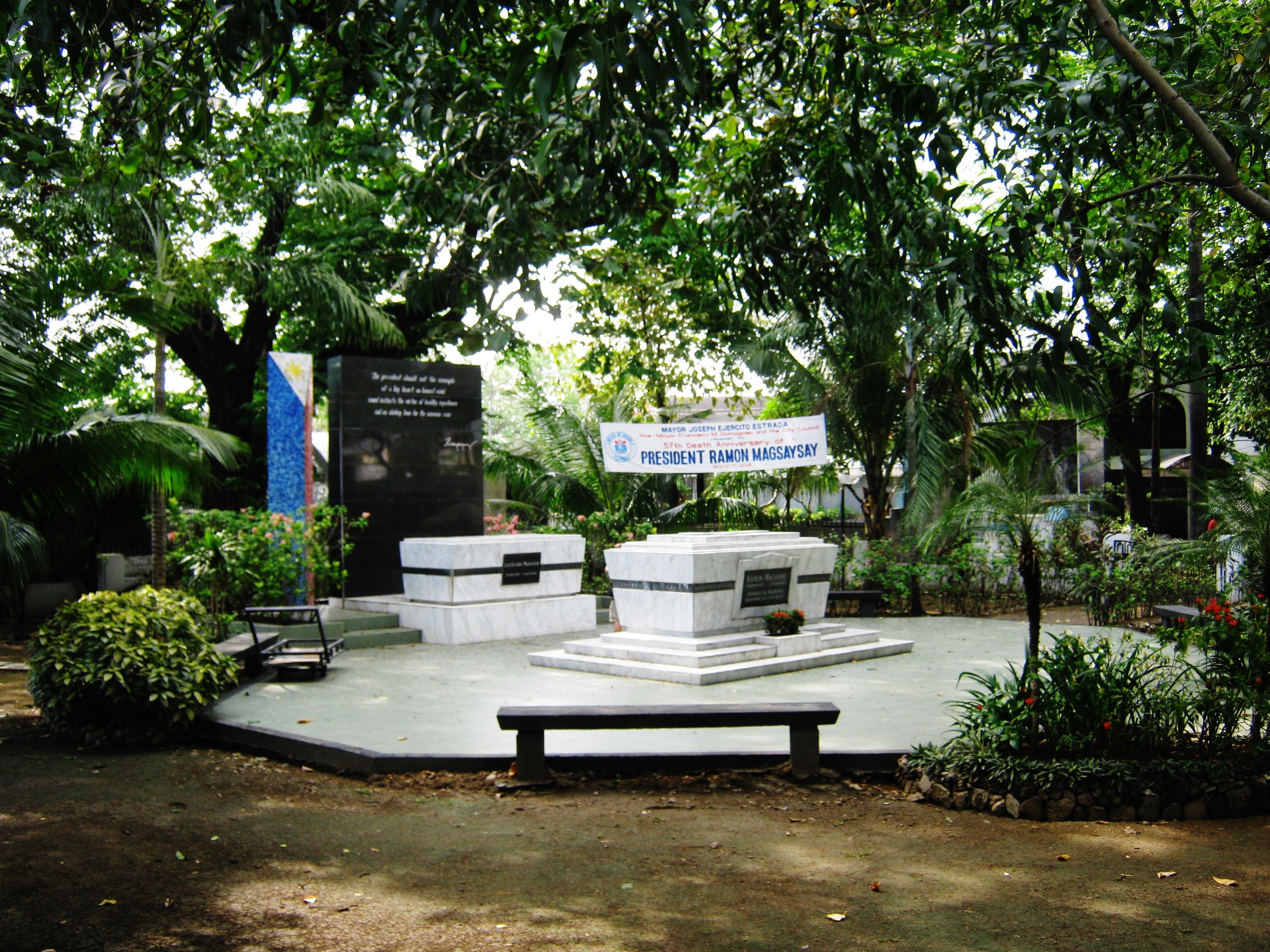
Magsaysay Memorial

- Ramon Magsaysay (1907–1957), former 7th president of the Philippines.
- Luz Banzon Magsaysay (1914–2004), former First Lady of the Philippines
- Genaro Magsaysay (1924–1978), former Senator of the Philippines and Representative of the Zambales

Bautista-Nakpil Family Plot

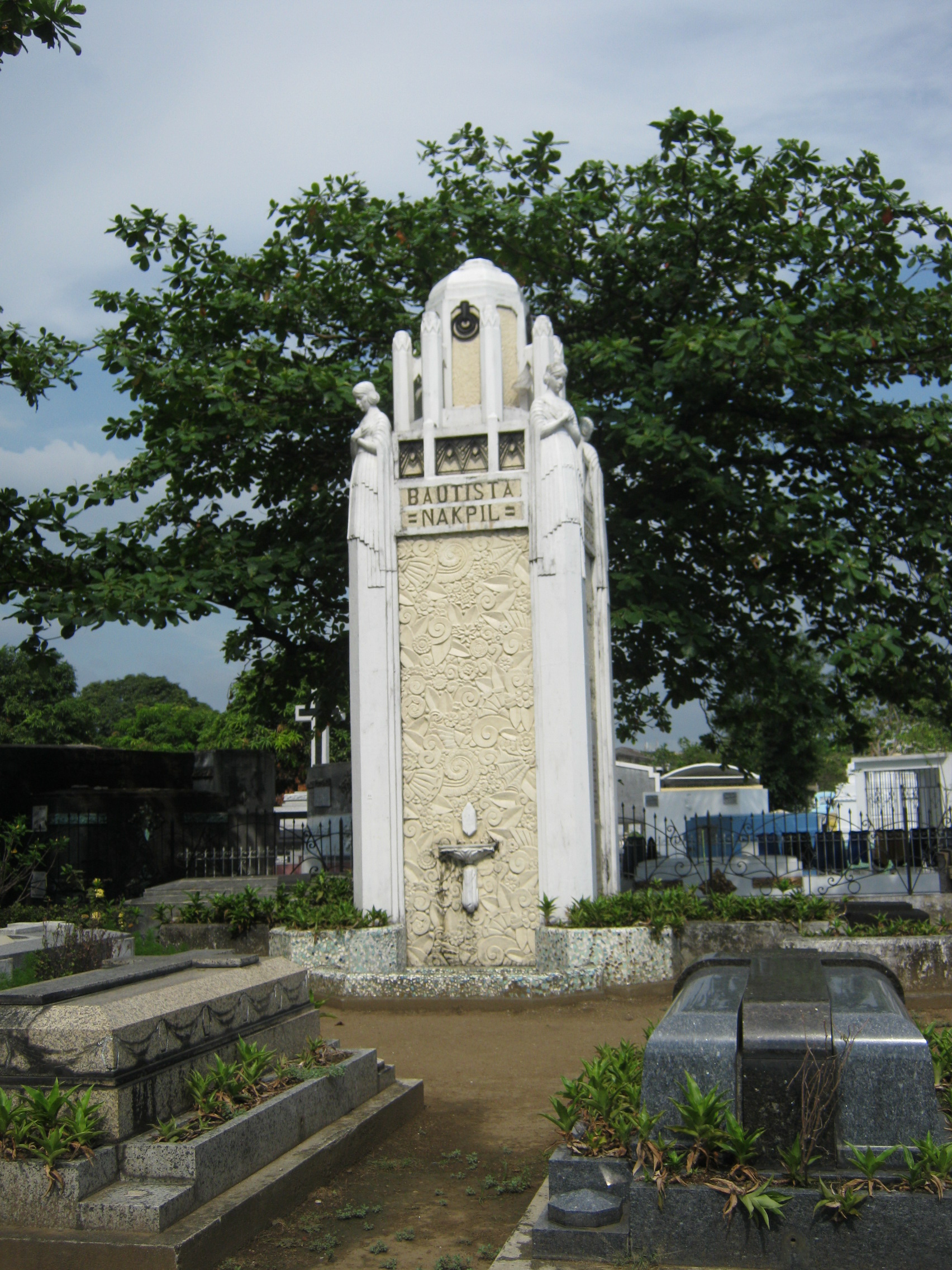
Bautista-Nakpil Pylon

- Ariston Bautista Lin, Filipino physician, philanthropist, and patriot.
- Gregoria de Jesús-Nakpil (1875–1943), wife of Andrés Bonifacio, later wife of Julio Nakpil
- Julio Nakpil (1867–1960), composer, father of Juan Nakpil.

Roces Family Mausoleum

- Alejandro Roces Sr. (1875–1943) – newspaper publisher, "Father of Philippine Journalism"
- Joaquin "Chino" Roces (1913–1988) – nationalist, newspaper publisher, and freedom fighter during the reign of Martial law under Ferdinand Marcos.

Tuason-Legarda Family Mausoleum

- Benito Legarda (1853–1915), vice-president of the Malolos Congress and first resident commissioner of the Philippines to the US Congress
- Iggy Arroyo (1950–2012), former congressman of Negros Occidental (2004–12)

Poe Family Mausoleum

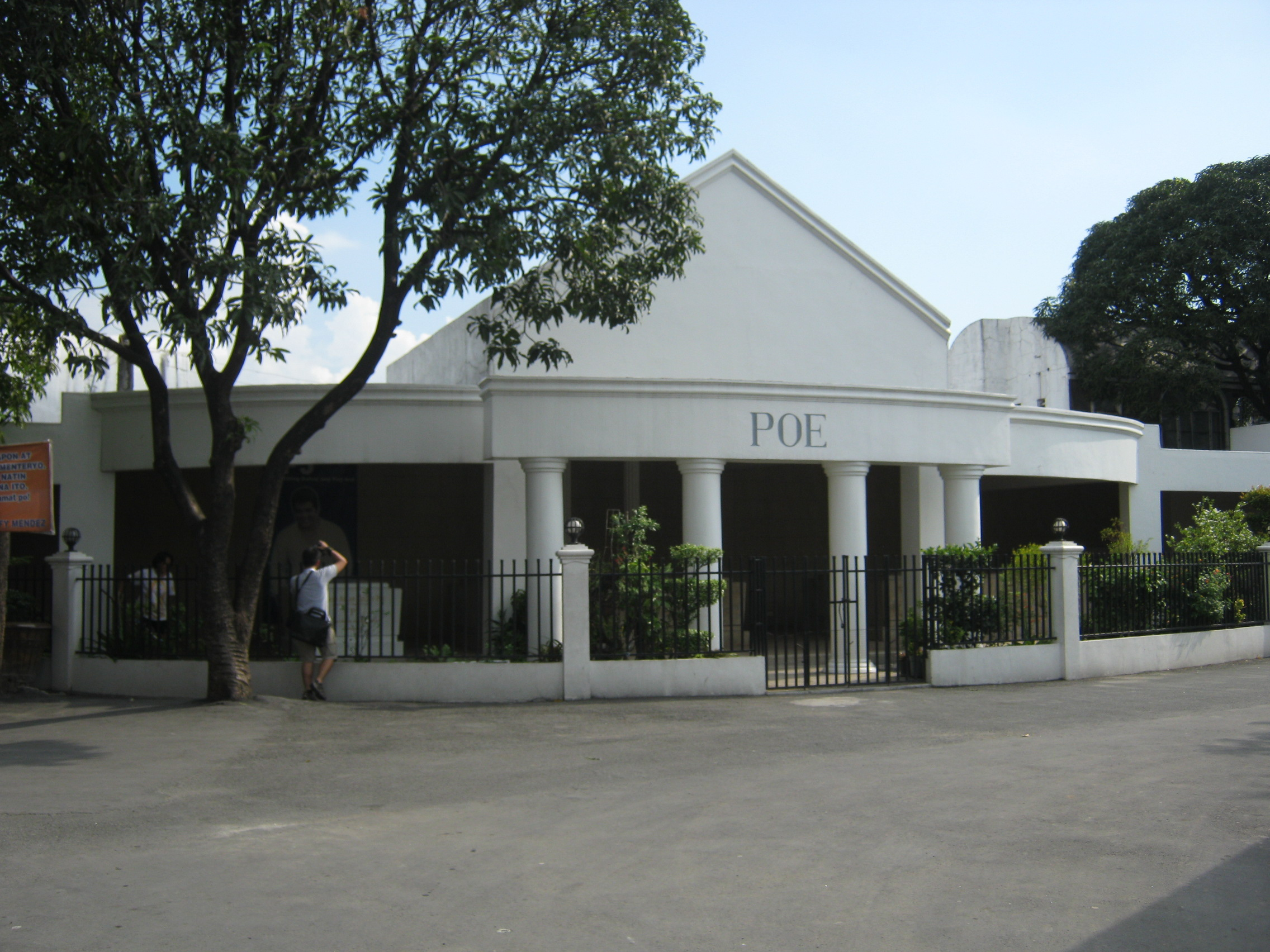
Poe Family Mausoleum

- Fernando Poe, Sr. (1916–1951), film producer, director, actor
- Fernando Poe, Jr. (Ronald Allan K. Poe) (1939–2004), National Artist for Film, and 2004 presidential candidate
- Susan Roces (Jesusa Purificacion Levy Sonora-Poe) (1941–2022), actress and wife of Fernando Poe, Jr.
- Andy Poe (1943–1995), actor and brother of Fernando Poe Jr.
- Conrad Poe (1948–2010), actor and half-brother of Fernando Poe Jr.

Other Group plots and memorials

- American Association plot
- Armed Forces of the Philippines Cemetery
- Boy Scout Cenotaph (in memory of the 24 Boy Scouts who died on board United Arab Airlines Flight 869 en route to the 11th World Scout Jamboree)
- Firemen's plot
- Jewish Cemetery
- Masonic burial grounds
- Military and police plot
- Thomasites' plot
- Veterans of Foreign Wars plot

Former interments

- Melchora Aquino (1812–1919), also known as Tandang Sora and Mother of Katipunan. Formerly buried at Mausoleo de los Veteranos de la Revolución, was later exhumed and reburied at Himlayang Pilipino. Remains transferred to the Tandang Sora National Shrine in Quezon City
- Pedro Guevara (1879–1938), former senator and resident commissioner to the US Congress. In 1993, his remains were transferred to Loyola Memorial Park in Marikina.
- Francisco Rizal Mercado (1818–1898) and Teodora Alonso Realonda (1827–1911), parents of José Rizal. Remains were later transferred to Museo ni José Rizal Calamba on January 4, 1997
- Paciano Rizal (1852–1930), oldest brother of José Rizal. Remains were later transferred to Los Baños, Laguna in 1985
- Trinidad Rizal (1868–1951) and Josefa Rizal (1865–1945), sisters of José Rizal. Remains were later transferred to Los Baños, Laguna in 1985
- Narcisa Rizal (1852–1939), sister of José Rizal. Her remains and the remains of the rest of her family were exhumed and transferred to Los Baños, Laguna in 2013
- Marcelo H. del Pilar (1850–1896), Philippine author and propagandist. Formerly buried at the Mausoleo de los Veteranos de la Revolución under the name Plaridel, was later exhumed and reburied in his house in Marcelo H. del Pilar Shrine Bulacan, Bulacan
- Manuel L. Quezon (1878–1944), Former President Commonwealth Government (1935–1944). Formerly buried at Arlington National Cemetery (buried from 1944 to 1946). Transferred to Quezon Memorial Shrine in 1979
- Aurora Quezón (1888–1949), Former First Lady of the Philippines, wife of Manuel Quezon. Transferred to Quezon Memorial Shrine in 2005
- Pedro Paterno (1857–1911), 2nd Prime Minister of the Philippines under the First Republic. Formerly buried at the Manila North Cemetery; his remains were later transferred at San Agustin Church
- Emilio Jacinto (1875–1899), patriot, the Brains of the Katipunan. Formerly buried in Sta. Cruz, Laguna and was later exhumed and reburied at the Mausoleo de los Veteranos de la Revolución. Remains transferred to Himlayang Pilipino, Quezon City in 1975.
- Licerio Geronimo (1855–1924), Revolutionary general. Initially buried at the Mausoleo de los Veteranos de la Revolución, his remains were then reinterred in the base of the Licerio Geronimo Memorial located in Rodriguez, Rizal on February 20, 1993
- Mariano Noriel (1864–1915), Filipino general who fought during the Philippine Revolution and the Philippine–American War. Formerly buried at the Mausoleo de los Veteranos de la Revolución
- Isabelo delos Reyes (1864–1938), politician, labor union activist, and a founder of the Iglesia Filipina Independiente. Formerly buried at the Manila North Cemetery and was later exhumed and reburied in the Maria Clara Church of the Iglesia Filipina Independiente in Manila.
- Juan Nakpil (1899–1986), National Artist for Architecture. His remains and that of his wife, Anita Agoncillo Noble, were cremated and transferred to The Heritage Park, Taguig
- Manuel Earnshaw (1862–1936), former resident commissioner to the US Congress. His remains were later transferred at San Agustin Church.
- Gerardo "Gerry" Roxas, Sr. (1924–1982), former senator. Transferred to the Loyola Memorial Park.
- Gerardo A. Roxas, Jr. (1960–1993), former representative of Capiz, son of Gerardo Roxas Sr. Transferred to the Loyola Memorial Park.
- Dick Israel (1947–2016), movie and television actor, formerly of ABS-CBN and Viva Films; his remains along with his wife Marilyn Michaca (1947–2016) were later transferred to the Eternal Gardens Memorial Park

== Popular culture ==
- The Museum Foundation of the Philippines and Carlos Celdran's Walk This Way both used to hold walking tours the Chinese Cemetery, North Cemetery and La Loma Cemetery.
- Manila North Cemetery and Chinese Cemetery have a trove of funerary architecture. Mausoleums are designed to look like Chinese pagodas, Hindu Shikhara temples, Egyptian pyramids guarded by Sphinxes, Greek- and Roman-inspired temples, Romanesque-type churches, even Art Deco mausoleums.
- A scene from the 1984 Filipino neo noir crime prison drama film Bulaklak sa City Jail was shot inside the Mausoleo de los Veteranos de la Revolución.
- The Manila North Cemetery was the plot setting for the episode 'Paa' of the 2010 horror film Cinco.

== See also ==
- Marcos Museum and Mausoleum
- Quezon Memorial Circle
- La Loma Cemetery
- Manila Chinese Cemetery
- Libingan ng mga Bayani
- Manila American Cemetery and Memorial
- Manila South Cemetery
- Scouting memorials
