= Román Ongpin =

Chinese Filipino businessman and philanthropist (1847-1912)

Román T. Ongpin
- Born: Román Tanbensiang Ongpin; February 28, 1847; Binondo, Manila, Captaincy General of the Philippines
- Died: December 10, 1912 (aged 65); Philippine Islands
- Resting place: Manila North Cemetery
- Occupations: Businessman, philanthropist
- Spouse: Pascuala Domingo-Ongpin

Román Tanbensiang Ongpin (February 28, 1847 – December 10, 1912) was a Chinese Filipino businessman and philanthropist who aided Filipino revolutionaries against the Spanish and American colonial administration in the Philippine islands.

== Early life ==
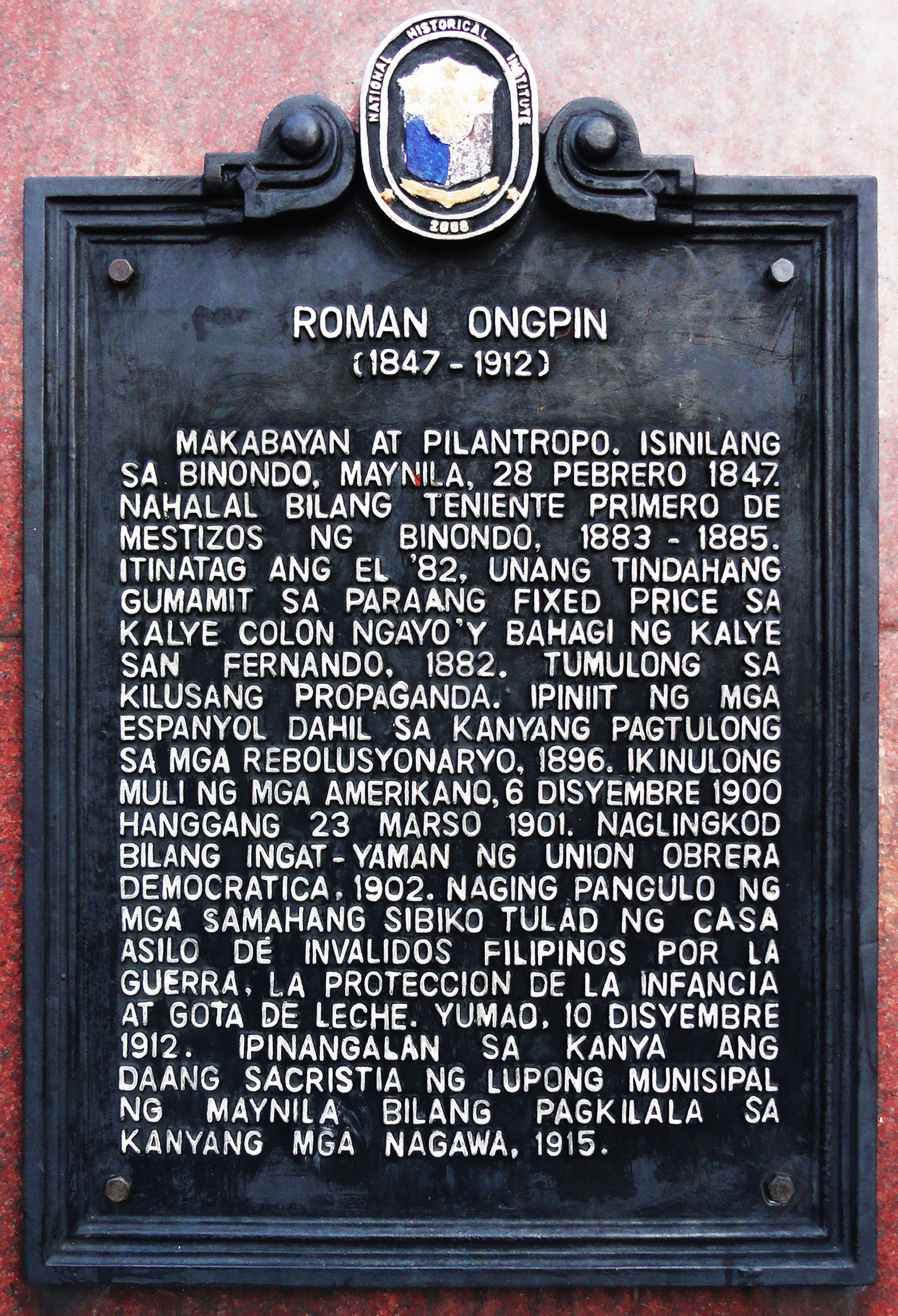
National historical marker installed in 2008 near Binondo Church in Manila

Ongpin was born in Binondo, Manila on February 28, 1847 to Simón Ongpin and Sinfrosa Tanbensiang. His father Simón (Chinese: 王翼彬; pinyin: Wáng Yìbīn; Pe̍h-ōe-jī: Ông Ia̍k-pin; hispanicised as "Ongpinco", Chinese: 王彬哥; Pe̍h-ōe-jī: Ông-pin-ko; later shortened to become "Ongpin", Chinese: 王彬; Pe̍h-ōe-jī: Ông-pin) was among those who left mainland China for the Philippines to do business, which he had learnt at a young age.

== Career ==
Ongpin established his own business in 1883 which he named "El 82" to symbolise the colony’s rebirth from the cholera epidemic the year before. Ongpin's business was a success, and his wealth and social standing improved. He pioneered the use of fixed pricing and the double-entry accounting system. Among the exclusive wares he sold at El 82 were art supplies; Ongpin's wife, Pascuala Domingo, was a descendant of Filipino painter Damián Domingo, noted for his more secular subjects. Through this, Ongpin also got involved with the Illustrados.

Ongpin eventually became a financier of the Katipunan, letting the revolutionary organisation use his store as one of its many hideouts. Ongpin also provided cash and food to the movement until the end of the Spanish colonization of the Philippines. Ongpin once again aided Filipinos in the ensuing Philippine–American War, and was jailed by American forces in December 1900.

Despite his release in March 1901, Ongpin remained staunchly opposed to the United States' occupation of the islands. He expressed this by not catering to Americans, and teaching his children to be self-sufficient without help from foreigners.

Ongpin was also involved in civic organizations and held several positions in these. He was the Teniente Primo de Mestizos, president of Casa Asilo de Inválidos Filipinos de Guerra (an institution for war veterans formed by Pascual Poblete) and treasurer of the Unión Obrera Democrática Filipina formed by labour activist Isabelo de los Reyes. He was also a member of the Philippine Chamber of Commerce.

== Death and legacy ==
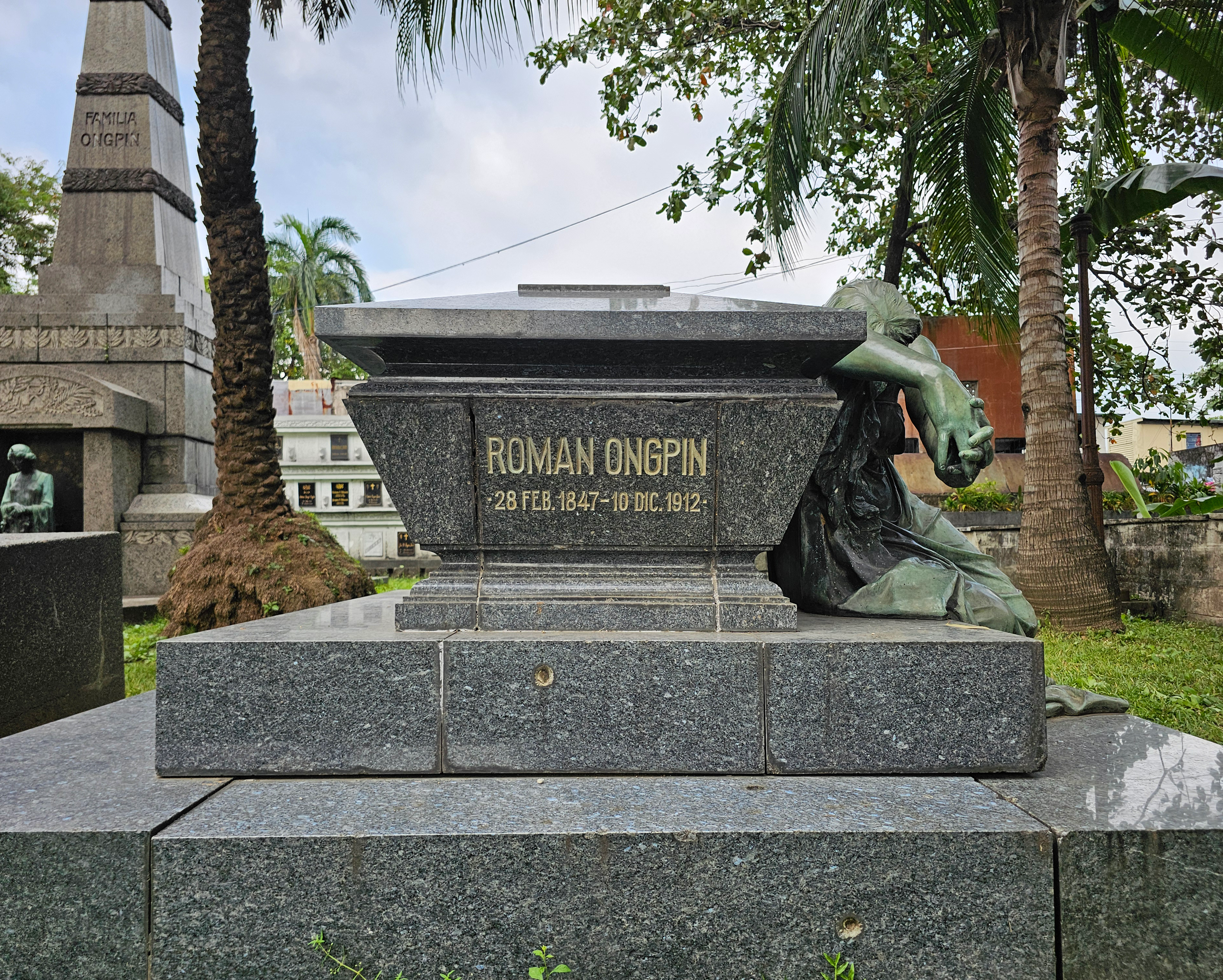
Ongpin's gravesite at the Manila North Cemetery

Ongpin died on December 10, 1912, due to heart ailment. Before his death, he requested his family to dress his remains in a barong tagalog. He was interred at the North Cemetery of Manila.

The street Calle Sacristia in Manila was renamed as Ongpin Street on September 17, 1915 and a monument of Ramon T. Ongpin was built near the Binondo Church Quintin Paredes corner Ongpin Streets and the Plaza de Binondo (now Plaza San Lorenzo Ruiz).
