= Hidalgo Street =

Street in Manila, Philippines

Coordinates: 14°35′53″N 120°59′9″E

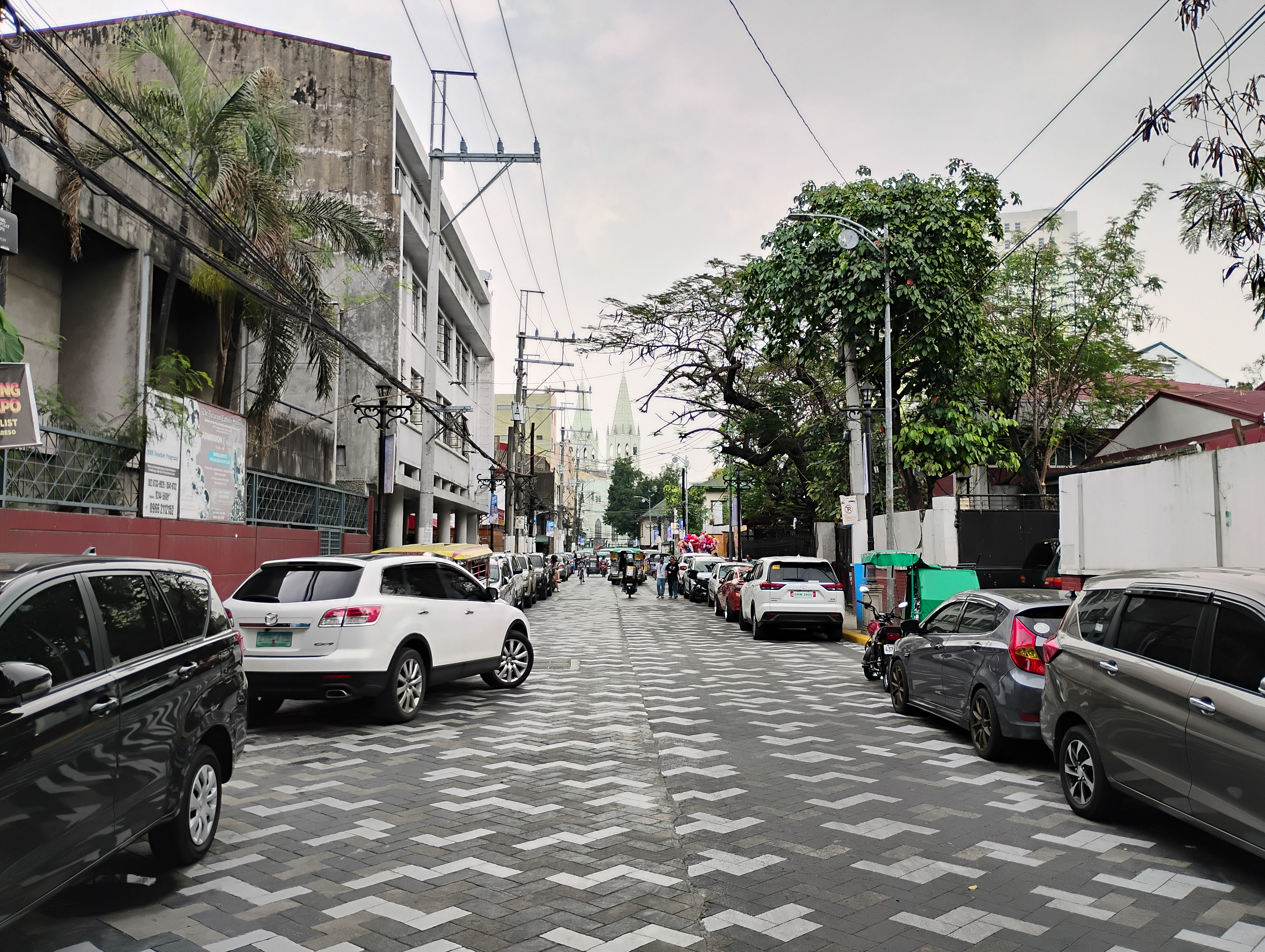
- Hidalgo Street looking towards San Sebastian Church
- Interactive map of Hidalgo Street
- Former names: Calle San Sebastian; Calle Crespo
- Namesake: Félix Resurrección Hidalgo
- Length: 0.8 km (0.50 mi)
- Location: Manila, Philippines
- West end: Gomez Street
- Major junctions: Villalobos Street; N170 (Quezon Boulevard); Bautista Street; Elizondo Street
- East end: Bilibid Viejo Street and Plaza del Carmen

Hidalgo Street (also F. R. Hidalgo Street or R. Hidalgo Street) is a street located in Quiapo in the old downtown of Manila, Philippines. It runs east–west through the district's center, linking two of its most popular landmarks, Quiapo Church and San Sebastian Church. It is divided by Quezon Boulevard into two sections: the western section is a pedestrian zone that forms the southern boundary of Plaza Miranda, running parallel to Carriedo Street, while the eastern section is a two-lane street which leads to the San Sebastian Church. Formerly known during the Spanish colonial times in sections as Calle [de] San Sebastian and Calle Crespo, respectively, it was renamed after the Filipino painter Félix Resurrección Hidalgo. It was once considered "the most beautiful street in Manila."

== Notable architectural structures ==
Among the historic structures along the Hidalgo Street area are:

- Basilica Minore de San Sebastian
- Basilica Minore of the Black Nazarene (Quiapo Church)
- Ocampo Pagoda Mansion (Bilibid Viejo Street)
- Nakpil-Bautista House (Ariston Bautista Street): Masterpiece by Arcadio Arellano, Viennese Secession motifs, home of Julio Nakpil, musical composer of the Katipunan, and Gregoria de Jesus, organizer of the women's corps of the Katipunan.
- Boix House (beside Nakpil house): Beautiful 1890s house with Neo-Renaissance ornamentation.
- Paterno Mansion (Hidalgo Street): Large mansion with Neoclassical details.
- Enriquez Mansion (formerly on Hidalgo Street, transferred to Bagac, Bataan): An 1890s house with Ionic columns. Praised by Maria Morilla Norton in the 1910s as "the most beautiful house in the islands." Became the site of the School of Fine Arts of the University of the Philippines.
- Ocampo Mansion (Hidalgo Street): Home to Francisco Santiago, composer of the Ave Maria. It is the original site of the University of the Philippines Conservatory of Music.
- Zamora House (Hidalgo Street): Residence of Manuel A. Zamora, inventor of "tiki-tiki" for fighting beriberi. It has a sequence of inner courtyards.
- Padilla House (Hidalgo Street)
- Don Jose Sulpicios Orpilla Mansion (Hidalgo Street)
- Genato House (Hidalgo Street, Bilibid Viejo): Home of Don Ramon Genato, a Spanish aristocrat whose son Vicente originally produced Chorizo de Bilbao/Chorizo Bilbao. The house, renowned for its ballroom, was once a gathering place for Manila's high society in the 1880s to 1890s.

== Schools ==
Along Hidalgo Street are Manuel Luis Quezon University Manila Campus and Nazarene Catholic School (formerly Quiapo Parochial School) Elementary and Secondary School buildings. The street also serves as an entrance road towards Guzman College of Science and Technology on De Guzman Street. On the eastern end of the street are Santa Rita College and San Sebastian College – Recoletos de Manila.

== Images ==
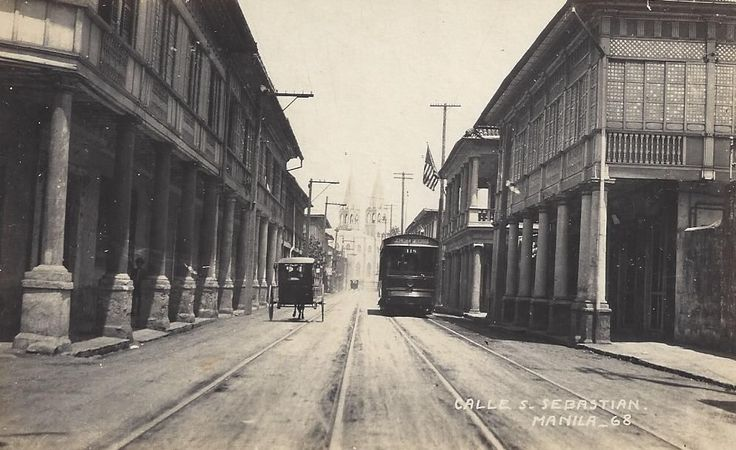
Calle San Sebastian (now Hidalgo Street)

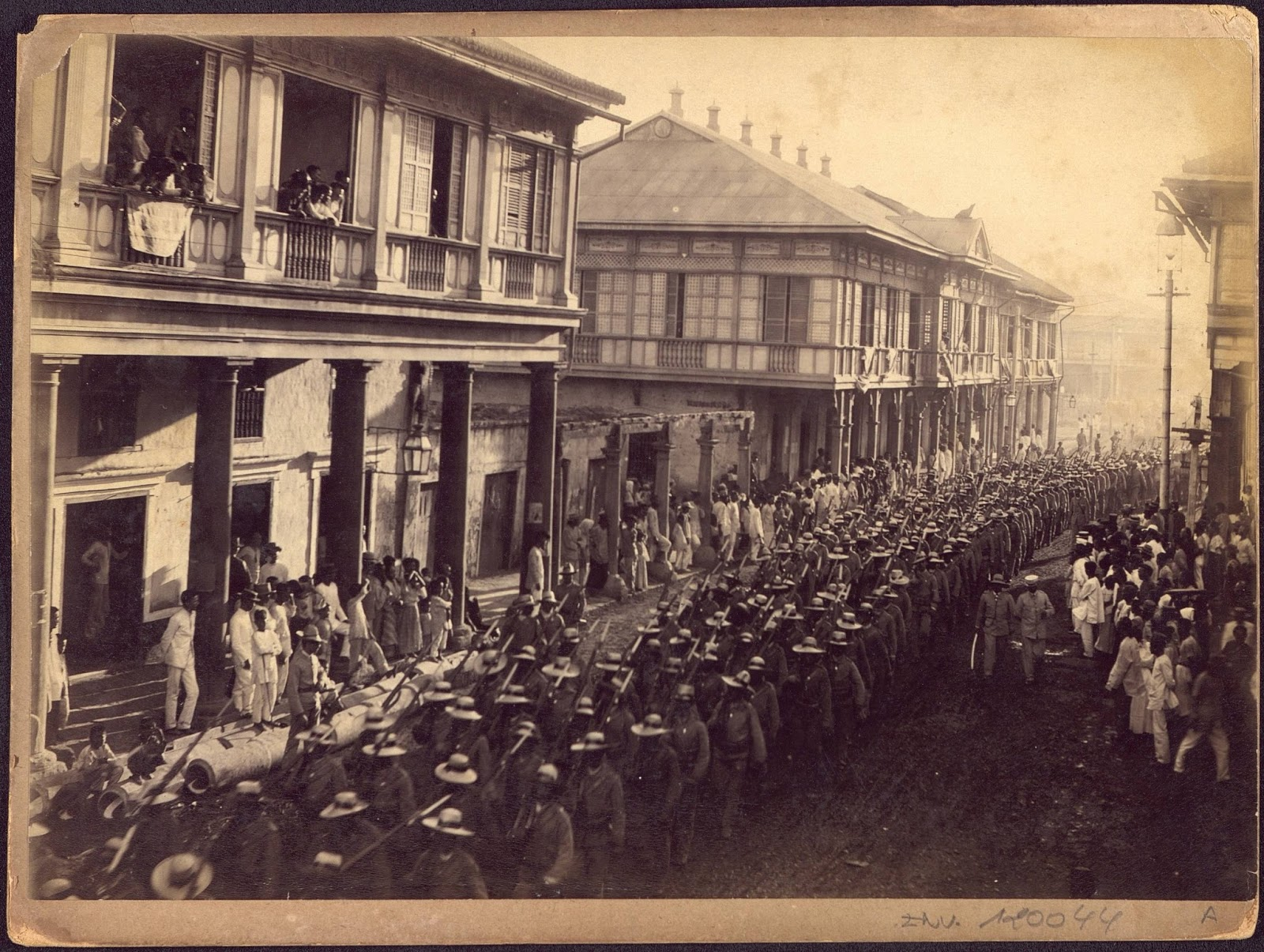
Parade of Soldiers at Calle San Sebastian (now Hidalgo Street), Manila

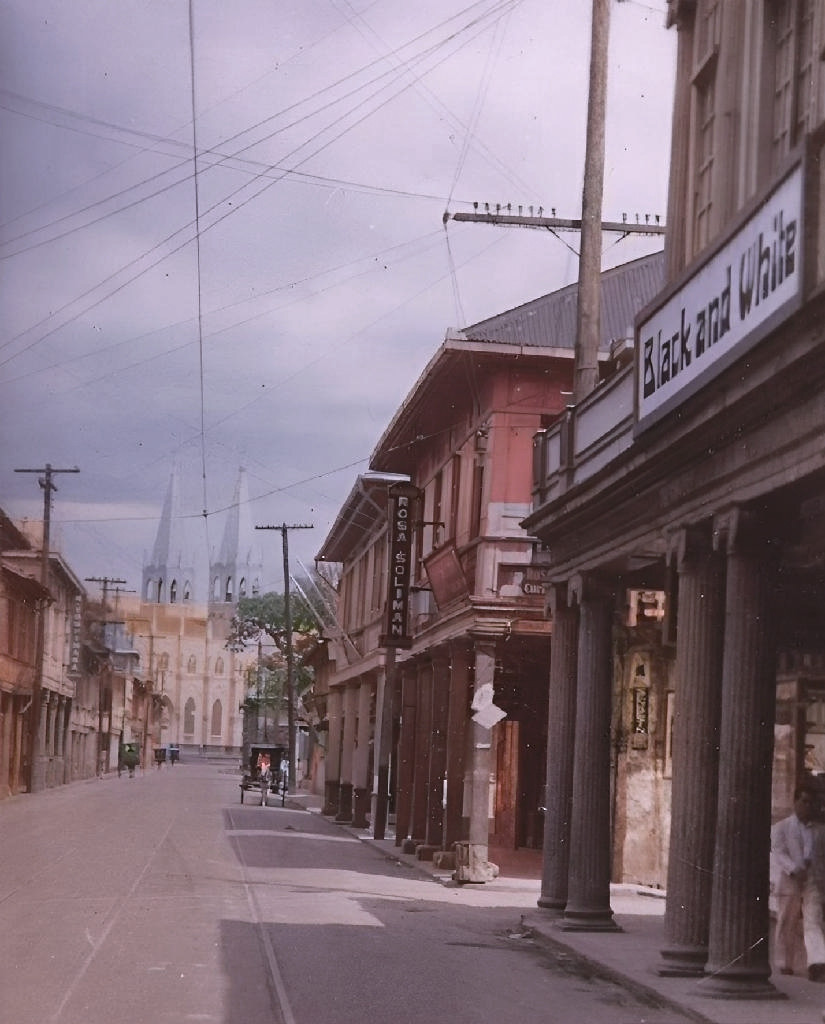
Ionic Colonnade Columns calle San Sebastian

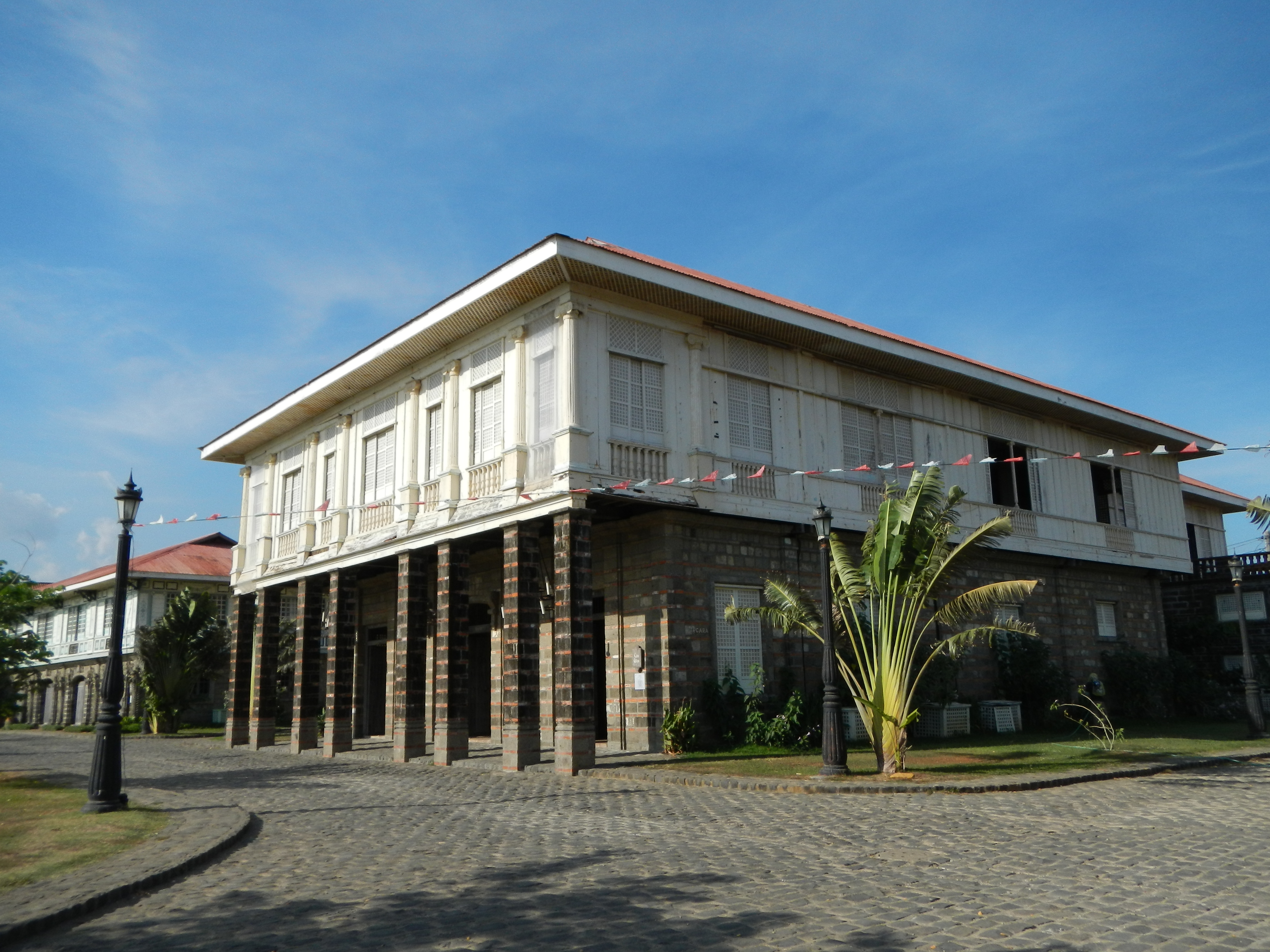
Casa Hidalgo (now moved to Las Casas Filipinas de Acuzar)
