= Fernando Zialcita =

Filipino anthropologist and cultural historian

Fernando Nakpil Zialcita
- Education: Ateneo de Manila University (AB, MA Philosophy) University of Hawaiʻi at Mānoa (MA, PhD Anthropology)
- Occupations: Anthropologist, cultural historian
- Employer: Ateneo de Manila University
- Known for: Philippine cultural heritage, identity, and urban heritage conservation

Fernando "Butch" Nakpil Zialcita is a Filipino anthropologist and cultural historian known for his work on Philippine cultural heritage, identity, and urban heritage conservation.

== Early life and education ==
Fernando Nakpil Zialcita holds a Master of Arts in Philosophy from the Jesuit-run Ateneo de Manila University, and earned both his M.A. and Ph.D. in Anthropology from the University of Hawaiʻi at Mānoa. He currently teaches at the Department of Sociology and Anthropology at the Loyola Schools, Ateneo de Manila University, where he also heads the Cultural Heritage Studies Program.

== Career ==
While originally from Manila, much of Zialcita's anthropological fieldwork has focused on farming communities in the Ilocos region of Northern Luzon. In more recent years, his research has shifted toward urban settings, particularly street-level studies, driven by his interest in urban heritage and regeneration. He is an active advocate for the preservation of built heritage in the Philippines.

Zialcita's academic and advocacy work frequently explores the intersections of Filipino cultural identity with both the Hispanic and Southeast Asian worlds. He has written extensively on traditional architecture, culinary heritage, and forms of popular Christianity, emphasizing that Filipino culture is best understood through a multifaceted approach that examines its diverse influences.

Zialcita is a professor at the Department of Sociology and Anthropology at the Jesuit-run Ateneo de Manila University and is program director of the Ateneo Social and Cultural Laboratory (ASCL). He obtained his M.A. in philosophy at the Ateneo de Manila University and an M.A. and Ph.D. in anthropology from the University of Hawaiʻi.

== Views on Filipino identity ==
His work Authentic Though Not Exotic: Essays on Filipino Identity (2005) argues against views of Filipino identity (in particular, those of the lowland Christian Filipino) as "bastardized," "corrupted," non-Asian, or too Western. Such attitudes, he claims, generally stem from the (1) "demonization of Spanish influence; (2) a limited menu of binaries of interpreting culture (i.e., colonial versus noncolonial/anticolonial and Asia versus West); (3) and reductionist [nativist] views" of culture among Filipinos, including intellectuals and scholars.

For Zialcita, lowland Christian Filipino culture, although not "exotic," (i.e., alluding to the preference of scholars and anthropologists for "uncontaminated" upland peoples as subjects for study) is an authentic, syncretic, and distinct culture, able to hold its own scholarly interest.

He proposes appreciating Filipino culture as one that is mestizo, where cultural mestizaje (derived from Mexican "mixing") is viewed as a desirable process, "articulated in terms of tensions and oppositions which are accepted as part of being human" (230). The word mestizo which implies a blending of cultures carries with it more positive associations in contrast to notions of hybridity, "mongrel," or "half-breed." Owing to a shared (syncretic or mestizo) Spanish heritage, Zialcita proposes increased interaction and comparative works between Filipino and Latin American scholars.

== Personal life ==
Zialcita is part of the Nakpil family of Quiapo, Manila who are direct descendants of musician and composer Julio Nakpil and Gregoria de Jesús, founder of the women's chapter of the Katipunan and widow of revolutionary leader Andres Bonifacio. He is a board member of The Bahay Nakpil-Bautista Foundation, Inc., a foundation dedicated to the preservation of the historic Nakpil-Bautista ancestral house.

Zialcita is fluent in Filipino, English, and Spanish.

== Published works ==
- Philippine Ancestral Houses,1810-1930. (1980).
- Notions of Justice: A Study of an Ilocos and a Bulacan Barangay. (1989).
- Tropical Living: Contemporary Dream Houses in the Philippines. (1990). (Ed. with Elizabeth V. Reyes, Paulo Alcazaren, and A. Chester Ong).
- The Soul Book: Introduction to Philippine Pagan Religion (The Philippine Reader No. 1). (1991). (Ed. with Francisco R. Demetrio, Gilda Cordero-Fernando, and Roberto B. Feleo).
- Filipino Style. (1997). (Ed. with Rene Javellana, Fernando Nakpil-Zialcita, Luca Invernizzi Tettoni [Photographer] and Tara Sosrowardoyo [Photographer], and Elizabeth V. Reyes).
- Cuaresma. (2000). (Ed. with Gilda Cordero-Fernando).
- Authentic Though Not Exotic: Essays on Filipino Identity. (2005). Ateneo de Manila University Press. [Winner, National Book Award (2006)].
- Quiapo: Heart of Manila (2006). (Ed.).
- Endangered Splendor (with E. Akpedonu, V. Venida). (2021). Ateneo de Manila University Press.

== See also ==
- Nick Joaquin
