= Zialcita =

Zialcita is a surname. Notable people with the surname include:

- Danny Zialcita (1939–2013), Filipino film director, writer and producer
- Eduardo Zialcita (born 1950), Filipino public servant and businessman
- Fernando Zialcita, Filipino anthropologist and cultural historian
