= Plaza Miranda =

Public square in Quiapo, Manila

- Public square
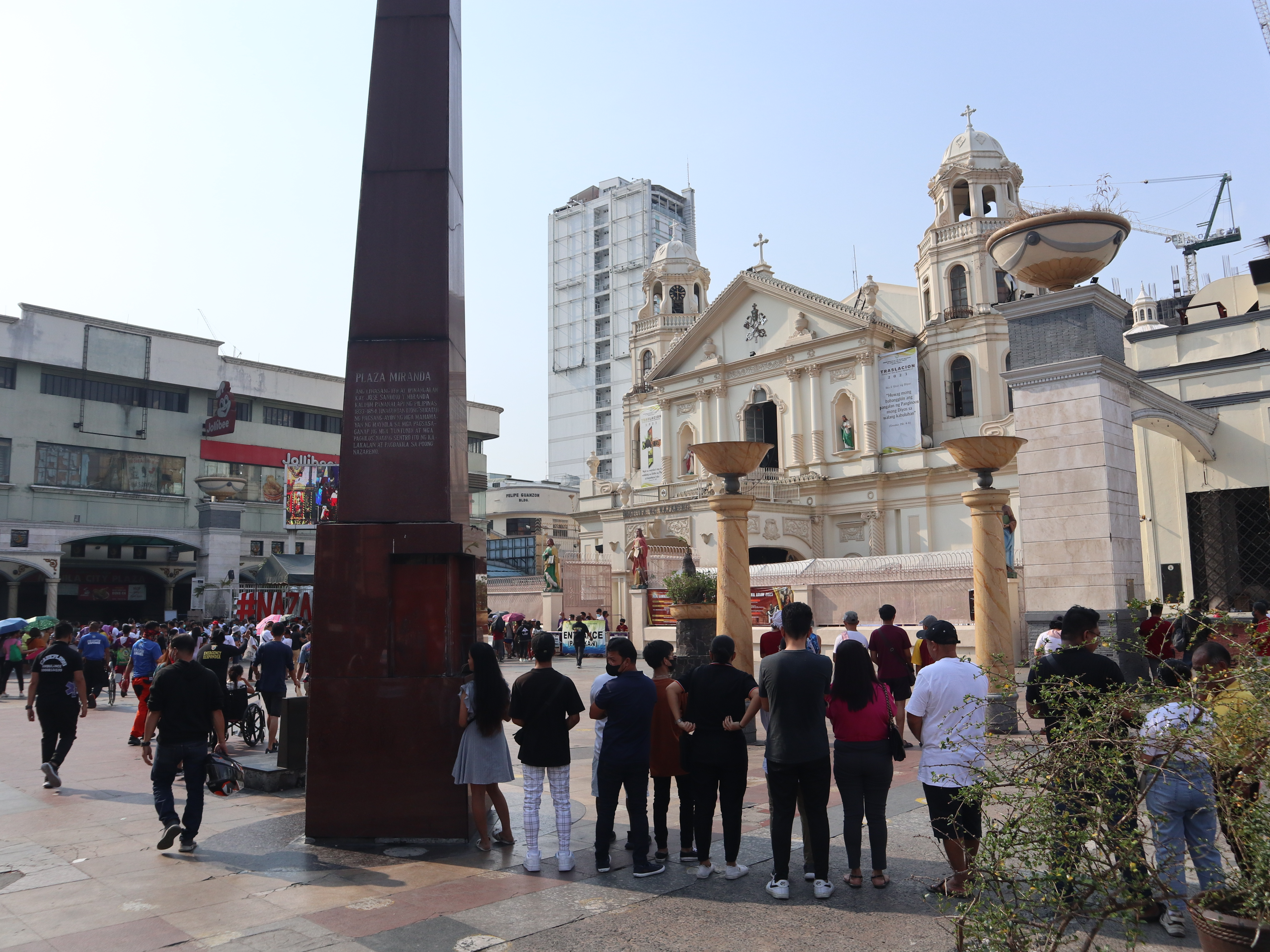
- Considered the center of Quiapo, Plaza Miranda is surrounded by several shopping buildings and its most famous landmark, the Quiapo Church.
- Dedicated to: José Sandino y Miranda
- Owner: City of Manila
- Location: Quezon Boulevard and Hidalgo Street, Quiapo; Manila, Philippines
- Interactive map of Plaza Miranda
- Coordinates: 14°35′53″N 120°59′01″E

Plaza Miranda is a public square bounded by Quezon Boulevard, Hidalgo Street and Evangelista Street in Quiapo, Manila. It is the plaza which fronts the Minor Basilica and National Shrine of Jesus Nazareno (Quiapo Church), one of the main churches of the City of Manila and is considered the center of Quiapo as a whole. Inaugurated in its current form by Mayor Arsenio Lacson in 1961, it is named after José Sandino y Miranda, who served as the Philippines' Secretary of the Treasury between 1833 and 1854.

Regarded as the center of Philippine political discourse before the imposition of martial law in 1972, the plaza was the site of the 1971 Plaza Miranda bombing, where two grenades were launched at a political rally of the Liberal Party, killing nine people. It later became the venue of the Movement of Concerned Citizens for Civil Liberties (MCCCL) rally led by Sen. Jose W. Diokno on September 21, 1972, where 50,000 people gathered together to protest the impending martial law declaration of the Marcos dictatorship. Martial law was quickly made official hours after the event. It underwent a ₱49 million renovation in 2000 after decades of neglect as a result of Manila's urban decay in the 1970s and 1980s, giving it a more modern design despite protests from various historical groups and cultural experts, with a monument erected to commemorate bombing victims and additional architectural elements installed. Currently, Plaza Miranda serves as a freedom park, where assemblies and protests may be held without needing a permit from local authorities, and with thousands of people crossing through it every day, it is considered Manila's version of Times Square.

Plaza Miranda's political significance also extended to other episodes of unrest before Martial Law. In January 1971, a confrontation between protesters and state agents known as "Black Wednesday" occurred at the plaza and resulted in five deaths. The incident formed part of the political unrest preceding Ferdinand Marcos's declaration of Martial Law. According to the University of the Philippines Diliman Third World Studies Center, Black Wednesday remains less prominent in public memory than the August 1971 Plaza Miranda bombing, despite being one of three major violent events associated with the site.

Despite fronting the Quiapo Church, Plaza Miranda and the streets surrounding it is known as a center for fortune-telling and the sale of lucky charms and amulets. Most fortune tellers who practice around Plaza Miranda claim that they can draw their ability to tell fortunes from their devotion to the Black Nazarene (the patron of the Quiapo Church) despite Catholic Church doctrine deploring the practice.

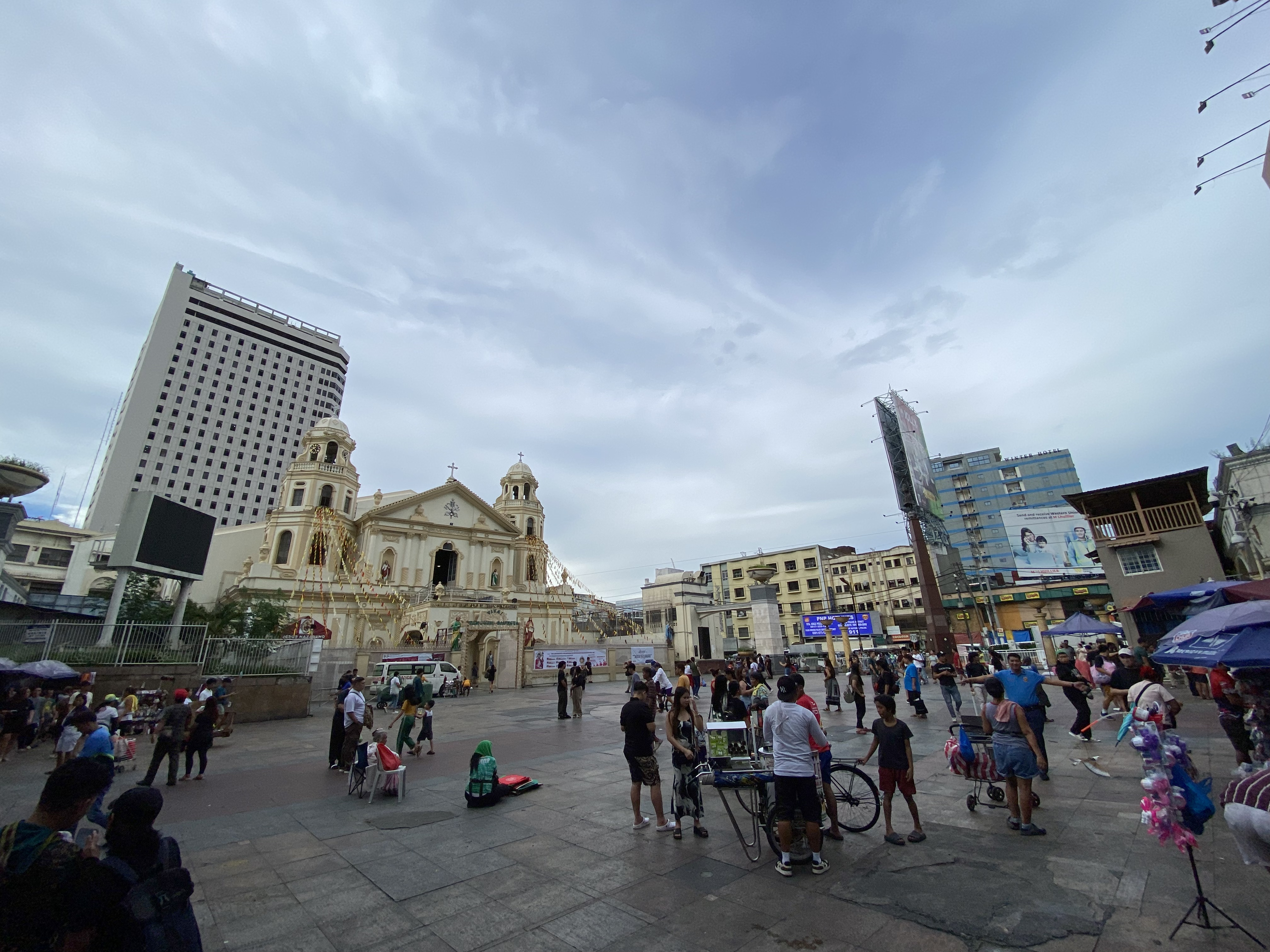
The plaza as seen from its western side

== Architecture ==
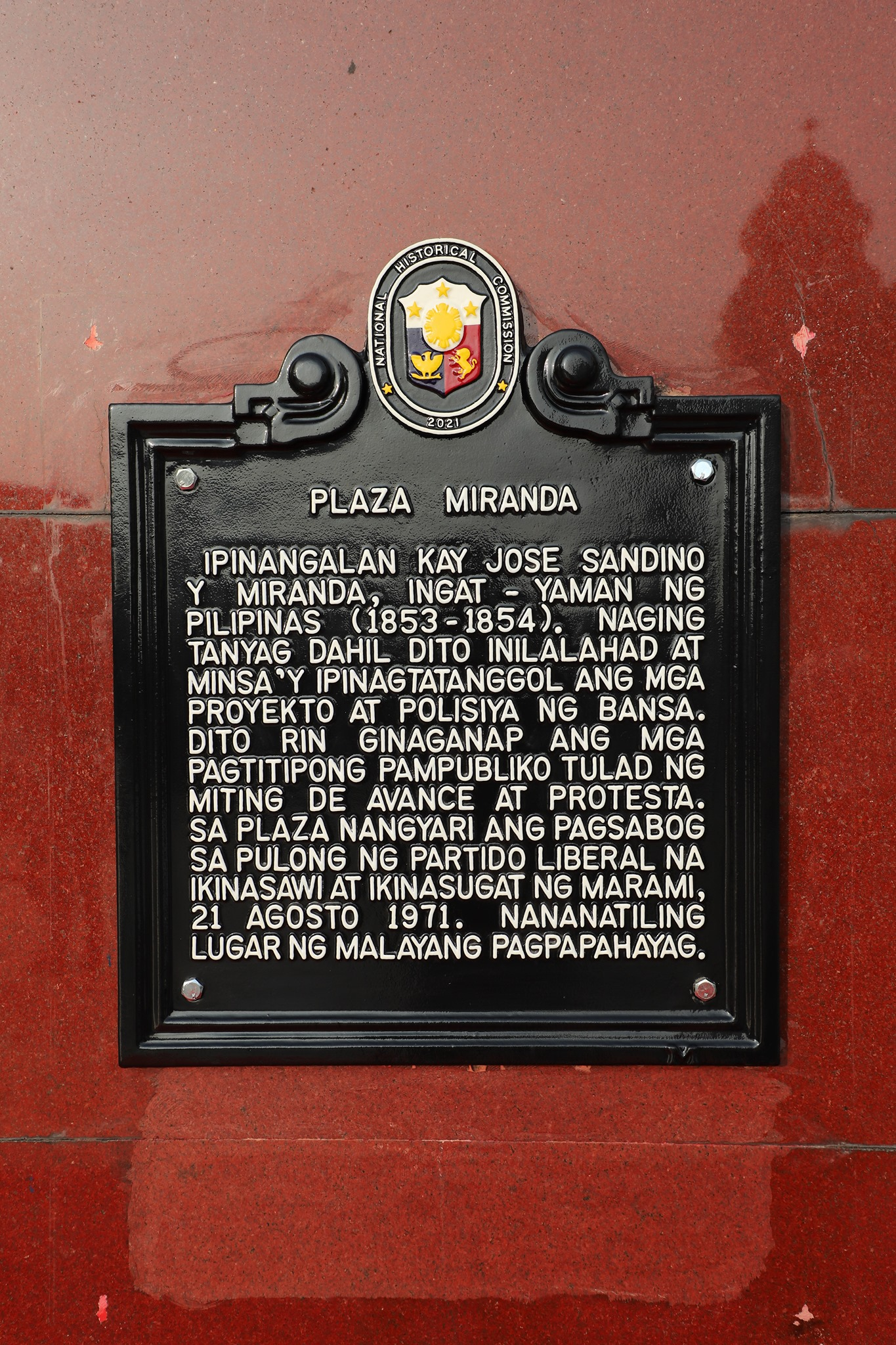
National Historical Commission of the Philippines' historical marker commemorating Plaza Miranda, unveiled on the 50th anniversary of the Plaza Miranda bombing

=== Design and layout ===
Plaza Miranda has an area of 5,358 square meters (57,670 ft^{2}), bounded by the Quiapo Church to the north, Quezon Boulevard to the east, Hidalgo Street to the south and Evangelista Street to the west. The plaza proper, which has a design capacity of 16,074 persons, is paved with granite tiles and is surrounded by Neo-Gothic architectural details which are inspired by the Quiapo Church's architecture, particularly on the western side, which contains two grand entrance arches bearing the coat of arms of Manila. The two grand arches are separated by several smaller arches, which form a covered colonnade, incorporating into their design the sea lion found in the coat of arms. A larger, more elaborate grand arch was also constructed on the plaza's south side, at the intersection of R. Hidalgo and Villalobos Streets.

Two of the plaza's four corners contain historical markers. A plaque commemorating the Plaza Miranda bombing in 1971 is installed at the southwest corner, unveiled by President Gloria Macapagal Arroyo on August 21, 2002, while the southeast corner, fronting Quezon Boulevard, has a 35-foot (11 m) high marble obelisk topped by a statue of a woman whose outstretched arms bear a torch, representing freedom. The obelisk is flanked by two columns on each side, topped with urns made from an alloy of cast iron and bronze, which also serve as gas-fired cauldrons which may be lit for special occasions. The Manila city government declared this particular corner the "Plaridel Corner" after the nom-de-plume of Marcelo H. del Pilar, editor and co-publisher of La Solidaridad, on August 30, 2005, the centenary of del Pilar's death, and the historical plaque, written in Filipino, bears a quotation attributed to the French writer and philosopher Voltaire.

Tutol ako sa sinabi mo, ngunit ipagtatanggol ko hanggang kamatayan ang karapatan mong sabihin iyon.
(I disapprove of what you say, but I will defend to the death your right to say it.)

The plaza is lit at night by several floodlights installed at strategic points throughout the area, both on the ground and on top of the colonnade. This and a sound system are controlled electronically from a control room located within the Lacson Underpass to the southeast.

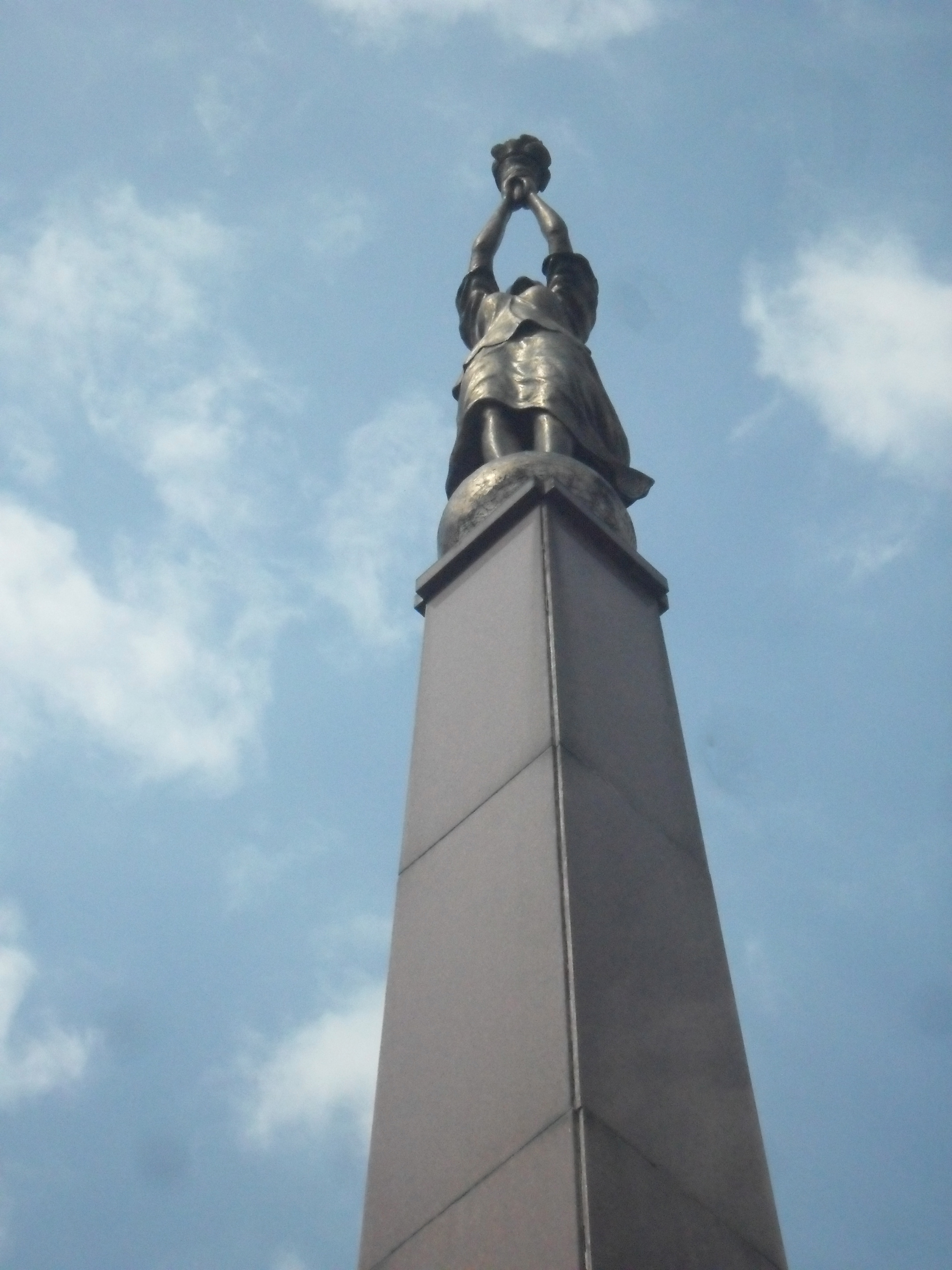
The top of the Obelisk in Plaza Miranda

=== Surrounding buildings and structures ===
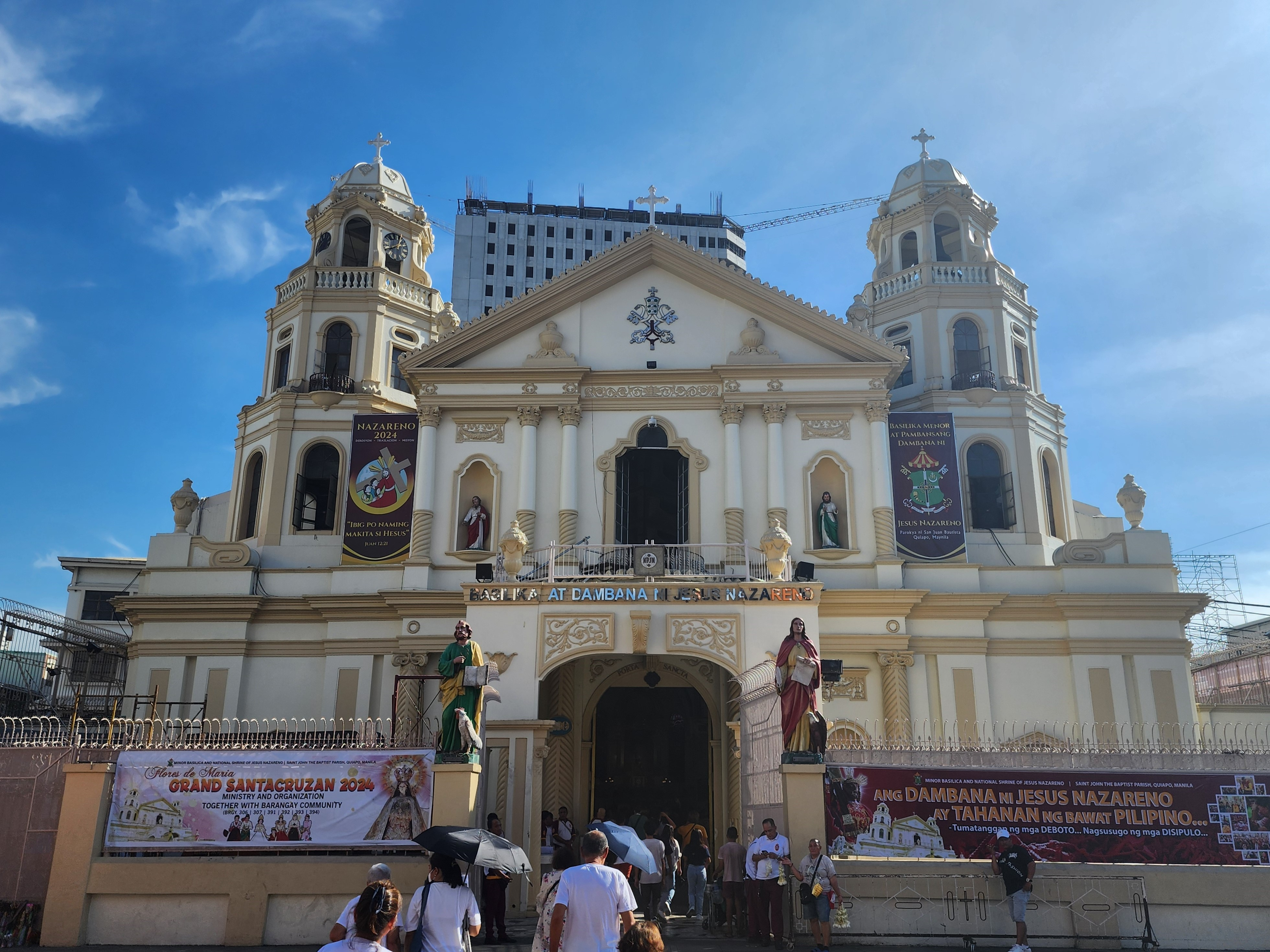
The façade of Quiapo Church looms over the plaza.

Aside from the Quiapo Church, several other notable buildings surround Plaza Miranda. The most prominent buildings within the plaza's vicinity are the F&C Tower (formerly the Picache Building), which formerly housed the headquarters of the Philippine Savings Bank, and the Times Theater, one of Manila's oldest cinemas. Before the 1970s, a building which stood opposite the present-day Plaridel Corner featured an electronic news ticker operated by The Manila Times; the building has since been demolished, and in its place was built the Plaza Miranda branch of Mercury Drug, whose façade features a large LED display. In 2015, the two displays were replaced with a single large LED display — said to be the largest in Asia — measuring 11.5 meters (38 ft) by 24.8 meters (81 ft).

The area around R. Hidalgo Street is also known as the "photographers' haven" owing to the presence of several buildings that house shops offering photography-related services, some of which have been in operation for decades.

Three of the seven entrances to the Lacson Underpass are located within the vicinity of Plaza Miranda: the Carriedo entrance at the plaza's northwest corner, the Villalobos entrance across from the Plaridel Corner in front of the Mercury Drug Plaza Miranda, and the Paterno entrance at the northeast corner beside the Quiapo Church.

== See also ==
- List of parks in Manila
- List of city squares
