= Ocampo Pagoda Mansion =

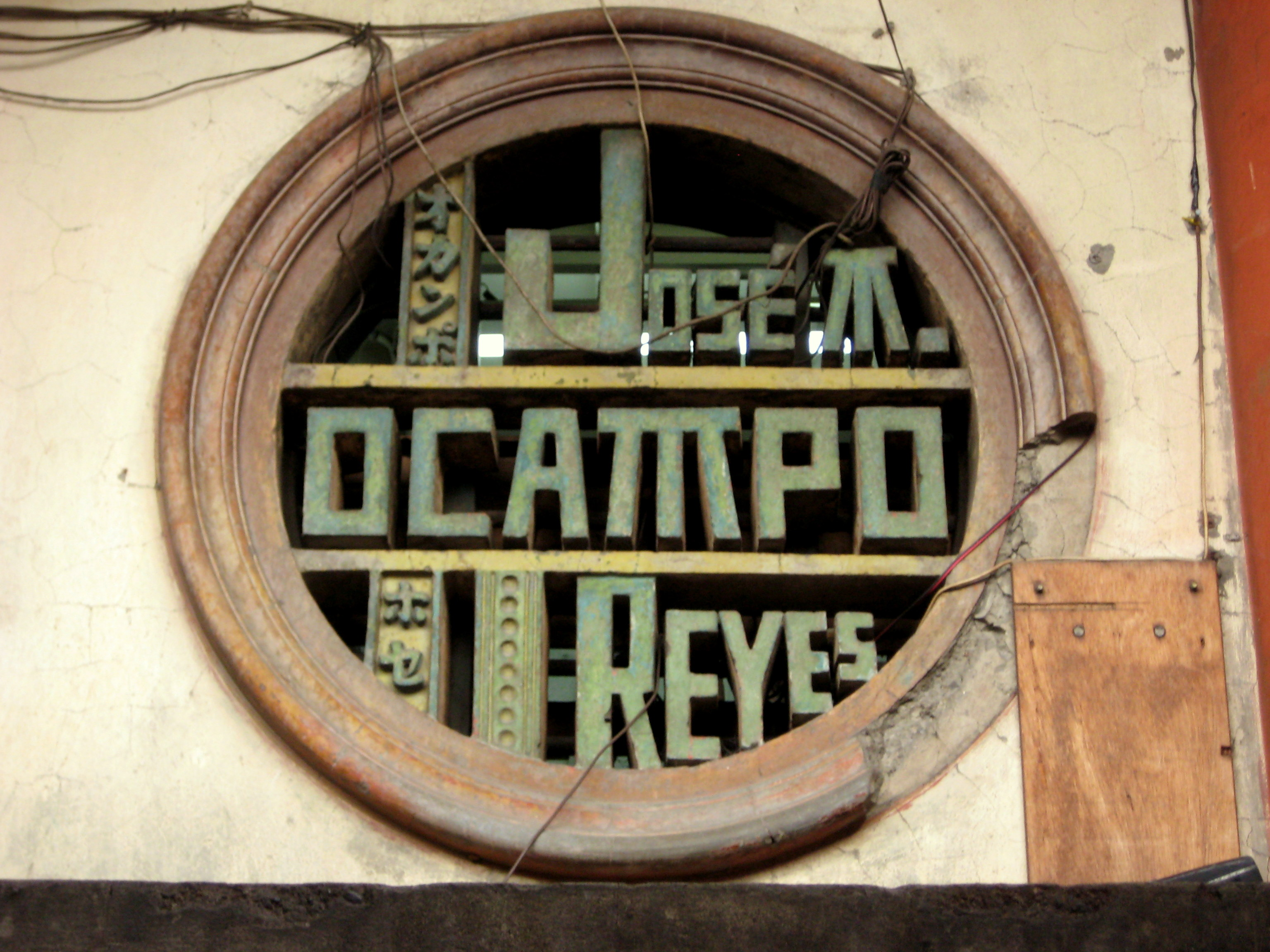
- Emblem of the Ocampo Pagoda Mansion
- Interactive map of the Ocampo Pagoda Mansion area

General information
- Type: Residential house
- Architectural style: Pagoda
- Location: Quiapo, Manila, Philippines
- Coordinates: 14.600291°N 120.985865°E

The Ocampo Pagoda Mansion is a mansion which resembles a pagoda configuration in Quiapo, Manila, Philippines. It was commissioned by Jose Mariano Ocampo and was constructed from 1936 to 1941 on the eve of the Japanese invasion of the Philippines.

== History ==
The three-storey structure with a seven-storey tower at the northwestern corner was Ocampo's vision of a Japanese castle standing behind his mansion across an estero (estuary). The Japanese-themed structure was inspired by the owner's admiration of Japan as having proved that an Asian country could modernize and equal the developments and progress occurring in the West. Ocampo was aided by two Filipino engineers and two Japanese overseers. It was timely that the Japanese-inspired structure was built during the colonization of the Philippines by the Japanese military. Because of the high-grade reinforced concrete that was used in the building, the house became a shelter for Ocampo's neighbors during the air battles between Japanese and American planes over Manila in World War II.

Now in a state of disrepair, the house was last seen fully intact in the 1960s.

== Architecture ==
Though Japanese-inspired, the Pagoda is a combination of styles. The base of the four-sided tower is decorated on two sides with juxtaposed Japanese dormer gables with ornate bargeboards. The reinforced concrete gables do not carry any ridge but act as an ornament to the tower's base. On top of the interwoven gables is the upper part of the tower which resembles a medieval Western style. The house is crowned by battlements with defensive, teeth-like crenellations. Machicolations are located beneath the battlements, and there are cantilevered turrets at the corners of the tower. The pyramidal red-tiled roofs, including the turret crowns, outline the house's structure in the skyline.

According to Victorino Manalo, a museum expert and director of the Metropolitan Museum of Manila, there is an elaborate world of symbols present in the structure. The most important of these symbols is Ocampo's personal emblem, which is the owl carved under the main gable of the lower tower.
