= Guzman College of Science and Technology =

Private college in Manila, Philippines

- Kolehiyong Pang-agham at Teknolohiya ng Guzman (Filipino)
- Seal
- Former names: Safe Driving Institute; International Automotive and Diesel Institute; Guzman Institute of Technology
- Type: Private
- Established: October 11, 1947
- Affiliations: CHED (Commission on Higher Education), TESDA
- Executive Vice President: Renato S. Relampagos
- Location: Manila, Philippines; 14°36′00″N 120°59′04″E
- Campus: Urban
- Sister Schools: Guzman Institute of Fashion, Guzman Institute of Electronics, Guzman Institute of Agriculture & Technology
- Colors: Red, White and Blue
- Website: www.guzmancollege.edu.ph
- Location in Manila Location in Metro Manila Location in Luzon Location in the Philippines

Guzman College of Science and Technology is one of the institutions founded by Don Zacarias P. De Guzman in 1947. It is a vocational college in Manila, the Philippines. Don Zacarias began the college out of sympathy for unemployed individuals who needed work after the devastation of World War II. Louie De Guzman, former head of Guzman College and son of Don Zacarias, has stated that the school has gained enough renown that "leading politicians would be invited on graduation to challenge the graduates."

== History ==
=== Founding and first courses (1940s and 1950s) ===
In its earliest days, the Guzman Education System was established on 11 October 1947 when Don Zacarias P. De Guzman founded the "Safe Driving Institute" at Recto Avenue in Manila with eight students. It was soon relocated to a small building in front of the Central Market in less than a year. The school name was renamed to "International Automotive and Diesel Institute" in 1949 to reflect the short-term vocational technical courses. In 1950, Don Zacarias established the Guzman Institute of Technology. Soon after, he opened the Guzman Institute of Fashion which was created to meet the growing social life of the Filipinos in the post-war era.

=== New campus and sister schools (1960s and 1970s) ===
Due to the increasing population of students, a six-storey building was constructed in Quiapo, Manila. The school was transferred to this new site in 1960 and additional courses were offered including secondary education. Another sister school was established in 1968, the Guzman Institute of Electronics in the old Cinerema Building to meet the demands in the rising electronics industry in the Philippines.

Eventually, it was soon transferred to the more spacious Ramon Roces Building along Soler street in Quiapo.

In 1962 Don Zacarias appointed Louie De Guzman as vice president over the vocational branch near Central Market in Manila which Louie presided over for two years. Thereafter, De Guzman was appointed to head the main building in Quiapo (then called the "Guzman Institute of Technology") from 1968 to 1970. During this time the enrollment reached over 8,000 students which he states was "one of the largest vocational schools in the country at that time."

The early martial law years in the seventies affected the college as well. Among the measures undertaken at this period of uncertainty was the introduction of two-year technical courses to supplement the regular courses being offered and in anticipation of an economic recovery.

=== Fire and restoration (1980s and 1990s) ===
The awakening of the economy in the early 1980s brought about opportunities in other careers, but wrought its toll on the school's administrative line up. However, a rationalization of the school's direction led to the formulation of the mission and mandate of Guzman Institute of Technology to its present concentration on technical vocational education.

On December 30, 1992, a fire razed the Quiapo six-story building to the ground. Makeshift rooms were set up, and the lack of full facilities adversely affected the school's enrollment in the ensuing terms.

Guzman Institute of Technology was heavily affected by the fire, but its sister school, the Guzman Institute of Electronics was able to continue expanding. It opened the Guzman Institute of Agriculture & Technology in Pinugay, Baras, Rizal in 1993, and its Dasmariñas, Cavite branch in 1994. Both branches eventually closed.

The Guzman Institute of Technology rebuilt in 1995, by then acting president, Bonier De Guzman, who constructed a four-storey building on the site of the old building and the Guzman Institute of Electronics moved to the new building in 1996. This now becomes the present day Guzman College of Science and Technology.

== Present times ==
The Philippine education system embraces formal and non-formal education. It is closely related to the American system of education but differs in the number of school years as other countries have 12 years basic education. In the Philippines, however, primary education is composed of six years and four years in secondary education in which with the tertiary education comprise the formal education system.

Non-formal education includes education opportunities that facilitate achievement of specific learning objectives for particular students, especially the out-of-school youths or adult illiterates who cannot avail of formal education. An example is the functional literacy program for non-literate adults and semi-literate which include basic literacy training and livelihood training skills.

The Guzman College of Science and Technology today is a major contributor to the field of automotive technology. With a firm partnership with Toyota Motors Philippines, the college is involved in the development of the latest technologies and innovations in the automotive industry. It holds gold medals in the youth and open contests in the skills competition sponsored by TESDA.

Facilities are upgraded with new functional audio-visual room. To cater female clientele, a four-year course in B.S. in Office Administration was offered in June 2008.

Instructors had recently attended the upgrading seminar as required by TESDA. The GCST has been accredited as a Testing Center for Manila in the following disciplines: Automotive, Building Wiring, Refrigeration & Airconditioning (HVAC). It is the recipient of a grant in its partnership with the Department of Environment and National Resources (DENR) in relation to its National CFC Phase-out Plan Project.

GCST is believed to be a veritable source of skilled manpower for industries and a high placement rate of 98%, the Office of Student Affairs coordinates with more than 300 companies nationwide for their requirements for trainees and employees.

Through the sponsorship of Toyota Motor Philippines Foundation, selected automotive students now enjoy full scholarship grant.
