= Julio Nakpil =

Filipino musician, composer and general

Julio Nákpil
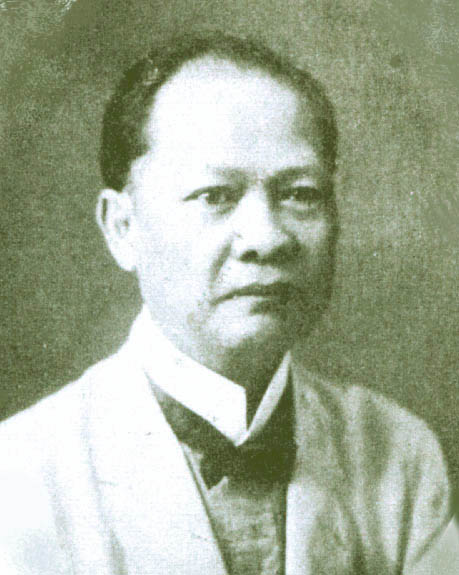
- Born: Julio Nákpil y García; 22 May 1867; Quiapo, Manila, Captaincy General of the Philippines
- Died: 2 November 1960 (aged 93); Quiapo, Manila, Philippines
- Spouse: Gregoria de Jesús (m. 1898; died 1943)
- Children: Juan Nakpil

Julio Nákpil y García (22 May 1867 – 2 November 1960) was a Filipino musician, composer and a General during the Philippine Revolution against Spain. He was a member of the Katipunan, a secret society turned revolutionary government which was formed to overthrow the Spanish government in the Philippines. His Katipunan adoptive name was J. Giliw or simply Giliw. He was commissioned by Andres Bonifacio, President of the Insurgent Tagalog Republic, to compose a hymn which was intended to become the National Anthem of the Tagalog Republic. That hymn was entitled "Marangal na Dalit ng Katagalugan". Thus, to some, he is remembered as the composer of the first national anthem of the Philippines. He is also a known huge critic of Emilio Aguinaldo.

== Early life ==
Julio Nákpil was born on May 22, 1867, as one of the twelve children of a well-off indio family in Quiapo district of Manila. His parents withdrew him from formal schooling after two years and had him look over the family stable. Julio educated himself at home and eventually learned how to play the piano as customary among the affluent families during that period.

During the outbreak of the Philippine Revolution in August 1896, Julio Nákpil was appointed as General by the Katipunan Government and was the commander of the revolutionary forces in the northern Philippines under Andrés Bonifacio.

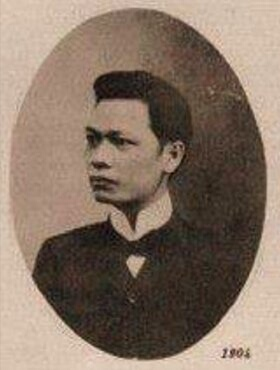
Julio Nakpil in 1904

Many of Julio's compositions during this time were inspired directly by the Revolution. Julio composed "Marangal na Dalit ng Katagalugan" which was intended by Bonifacio to become the national anthem of the Philippines but was ultimately replaced for Lupang Hinirang composed by Julián Felipe. After execution of the Bonifacio brothers, Nákpil claimed to have received threats on his own life as well as that of General Antonio Luna, the which latter ending up being assassinated.

== Later life ==
After the Revolution, Nákpil fell in love with and eventually married Bonifacio's widow Gregoria de Jesús. They moved to Manila and raised six children. Their eldest child and the only boy was Juan Nákpil who became a prominent Filipino architect and was recognized as a National Artist for Architecture. Another child married the architect Carlos Santos-Viola. Julio continued to compose until his death in 1960. Before his death he also contributed to a book on his life that was published by his heirs in 1964.

He became a renowned critic of Emilio Aguinaldo, in his memoirs titled Apuntes Sobre la Revolución Filipina (Notes on the Philippine Revolution) I swear before God and before History that everything related in these notes is the truth and I entreat the historian not to publish this until after my death." On page 30 of his memoirs can be found Nákpil's notes on the death of Bonifacio, and on page 130 is his account of the assassination of Antonio Luna where Nákpil wrote "When General A. Luna was dastardly assassinated by Janolino and his men on the stairs of the Convent of Kabanatuan and already fallen on the ground, Trinidad Aguinaldo the mother of Emilio Aguinaldo looked out the window and asked: Ano, humihinga pa ba? (So, is he still breathing?) (according to Nákpil's account)

On pages 157-158, Nákpil wrote of Aguinaldo,

"Emilio Aguinaldo's surrender to the Americans was a cowardly act. There was no doubt that he coveted the presidency. He surrendered for fear that others more competent than he would occupy the post of president of the Republic. Had he fought with his captors, regardless of whether he succumbed so that he might be considered a hero, at least to vindicate his crimes, by this time we would be admiring a monument to the second hero of the Philippines, unlike what he did delivering himself as prisoner and afterward taking an oath of allegiance to the American flag."

== Death ==
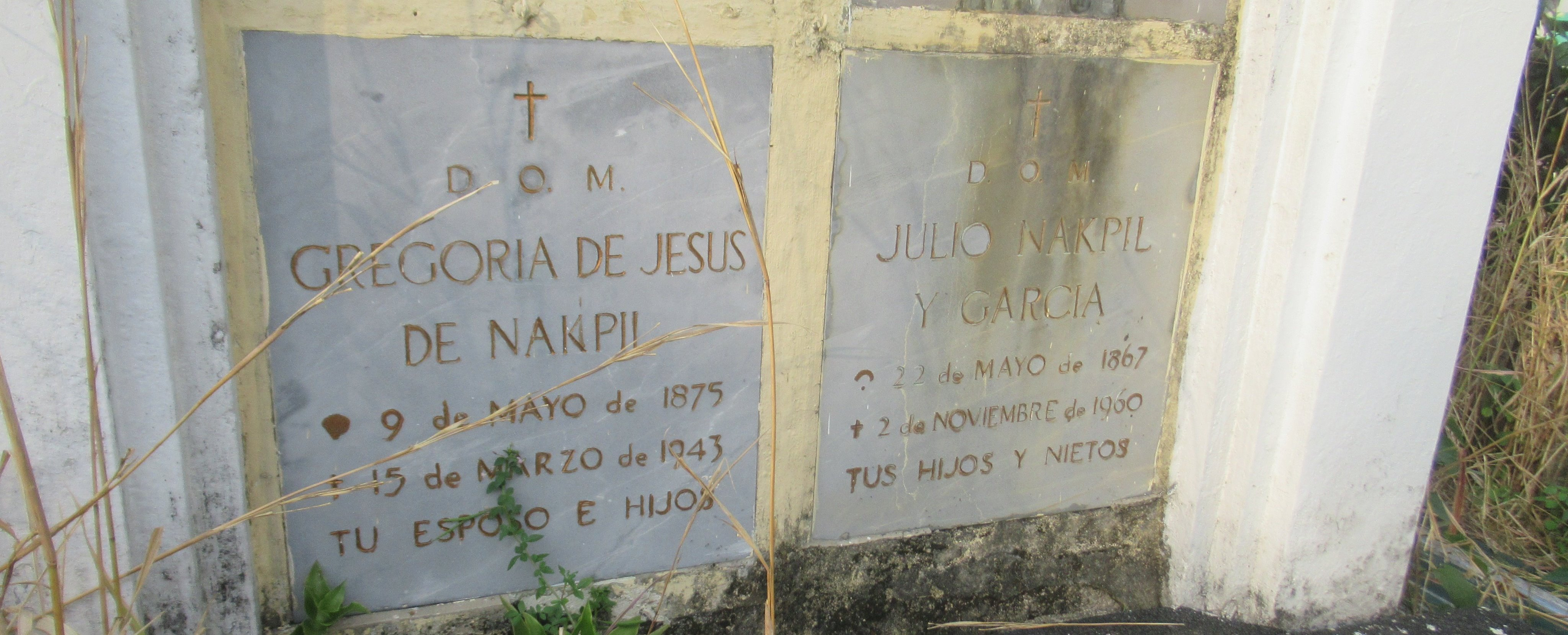
Grave of Nakpil and Gregoria de Jesús at the Manila North Cemetery

Nákpil died of heart attack at his home on November 2, 1960, in Quiapo, Manila. He was buried at Manila North Cemetery in Santa Cruz, Manila the next day.

== Legacy ==
The house where Nákpil and de Jesús lived, known as Bahay Nákpil-Bautista, still stands in Quiapo and is maintained by his heirs as a museum that also offers walking tours of Quiapo and other special events and doubles as a performance area.

Bahay Nákpil-Bautista is one of the two Spanish-style structures left standing in Bautista Street, Quiapo, Manila, the other being Casa Boix.

== Compositions ==
The Compositions of Julio Nakpil
Date	Title	Genre	Instrumentation	Notes
1888 April 27	Cefiro	Polka	Piano	Nákpil's first known composition.
1890 May 17	La Brisa Nocturna	Habanera	Piano	
1890 September 29	Noche Tempestuosca	Polka de Salon	Piano	
1890	Ecos de Visayas	Danza	Piano	
1890	Ecos de Iloco	Danza	Piano	
1890	Ilang-ilang	Mazurka	Piano	
1891 May 28	Recuerdos de Cápiz	Habanera Carateristica	Piano	Nákpil's most famous composition. Published in 6 editions. Awarded the Diploma for Honor by the 1st Exposición Regional de Filipina in 1895 and a silver medal at the St. Louis World's Fair in 1904.
1891 August 1	Luz Poetica de la Aurora	Gavota	Piano; Piano 4 hands	Awarded the Diploma for Honor in 1895 by the 1st Exposición Regional de Filipina in 1895.
1891 October 21	Danza Campestre	Habanera de Concierto	Piano	
1891 October 21	Teatro Luisa	Polka Brillante	Piano	
1891 November 25	La Brisa Aurora	Habanera	Piano	
1892 May 4	Cleotilde		Piano	
1892 July 15	Kundiman	Kundiman	Piano	An arrangement of Jose Rizal's favorite Kundiman
1891	Sueño Eterno	Mazurka Funebre	Piano	Dedicated to Nákpil's late father
1893 August 4	Amor Patrio	Romanza	Soprano, Orchestra; Soprano, Oboe, Piano	a scope of Maria Clara's song in Jose Rizal's novel Noli me Tangere.
1895	Exposición Regional de Filipina	Pas à quatre	Piano	Awarded the Diploma for Honor in 1895 by the 1st Exposición Regional de Filipina in 1895.
1896 January 27	Marangal na Dalit ng Katagalugan	National Anthem	Voices, Piano	Commissioned by Andres Bonifacio as the national anthem of the Tagalog Republic. However, Julian Felipe's Lupang Hinirang eventually became the country's official National Anthem.
1896 August 26	Cry of Balintawak		Piano; Band	
1896 August 30	Armamento			
1897 March 20	Pahimakas	Mazurka Funebre	Piano; Band; Orchestra	A funeral march commemorating Rizal's execution.
1897 June 15	Pamitinan	Polka Carateristica	Orchestra	for the remontados “who went into hiding because of persecution.”
1897 October 12	Pag-Ibig	Habanera	Voice, Piano	Written for his wife Gregoria de Jesus
1898 October 12	Pasig-Pantayanin	Paso-doble Militar	Piano; Orchestra	A military march dedicated to the brave revolutionaries.
1898 November	Biyak-na-Bato	Paso-doble Militar	Band	composed for revolutionary general Teodoro Sandiko
1899	Kabanatuan	Marcha Funebre	Band; Orchestra; Piano	Funeral March in memory of the death of Antonio Luna. Premiered 1904.
1903 September	Salve Patria	Grand March	Orchestra	Arrangement of Marangal na Dalit ng Katagalugan as a Grand March, with further additions
1904	Pinching	Habanera	Piano	
1943 August 26	Deus Omnipotens et Misericors	Marcha Funebre	Band	Dedicated to the memory of those who have fallen during the night
1944 September 19	Victory March	March	Orchestra	Dedicated to the armies of the United States and the Philippines and her Guerrilla
	Johnny and Little Julia	Boston Waltz		
	Melodia			
