= Bahay Nakpil–Bautista =

Museum in Manila, Philippines

Bahay Nakpil-Bautista
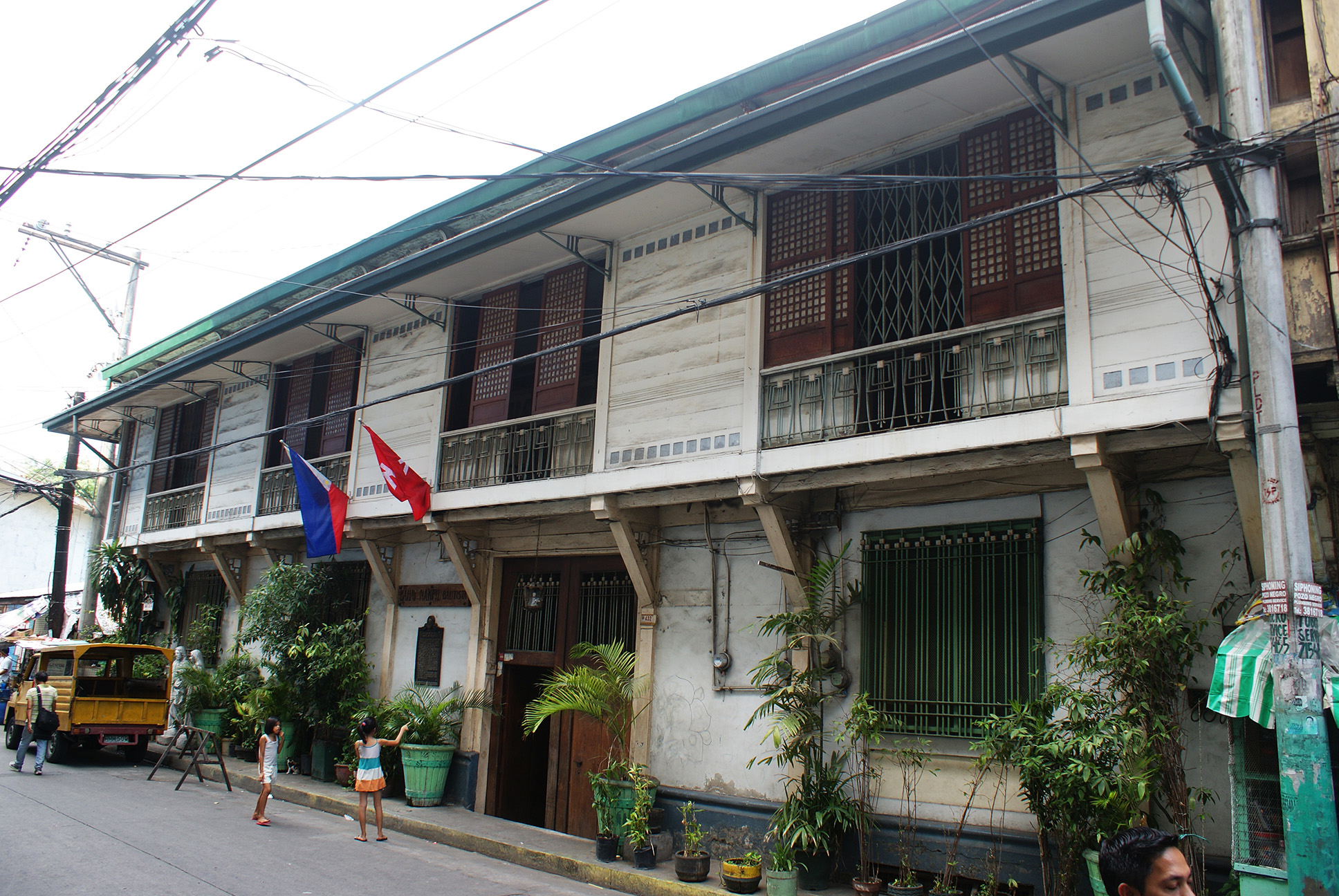
- View from the street
- Interactive map of the Bahay Nakpil-Bautista area

General information
- Location: A. Bautista Street, Quiapo, Manila, Philippines
- Coordinates: 14°35′54″N 120°59′05″E
- Construction started: 1914

The Nakpil-Bautista House (Filipino: Bahay Nakpil-Bautista) is a bahay na bato ancestral home found in the district of Quiapo, Manila, the Philippines. It was built in 1914 by Arcadio Arellano. The house originally sat on two lots, having a total area of 500 square metres (5,400 sq ft).

The National Historical Commission of the Philippines declared the house as a cultural property on August 25, 2011. Today, the house is a museum and community center showcasing items of the Katipunan, paintings, among others.

== History ==
Arcadio Arellano built the house for Dr. Ariston Bautista and his wife, Perona Nakpil, which survives on 432 Barbosa Street (now A. Bautista Street), Quiapo, two blocks away from the Enriquez ancestral home along Hidalgo Street. Built in 1914, the house is typical of its period: in the lower storey, thin, narrow, brick walls pressed together by wooden studs; upstairs, rooms aired by large calados and shaded by sufficient media aguas.

== Architecture ==
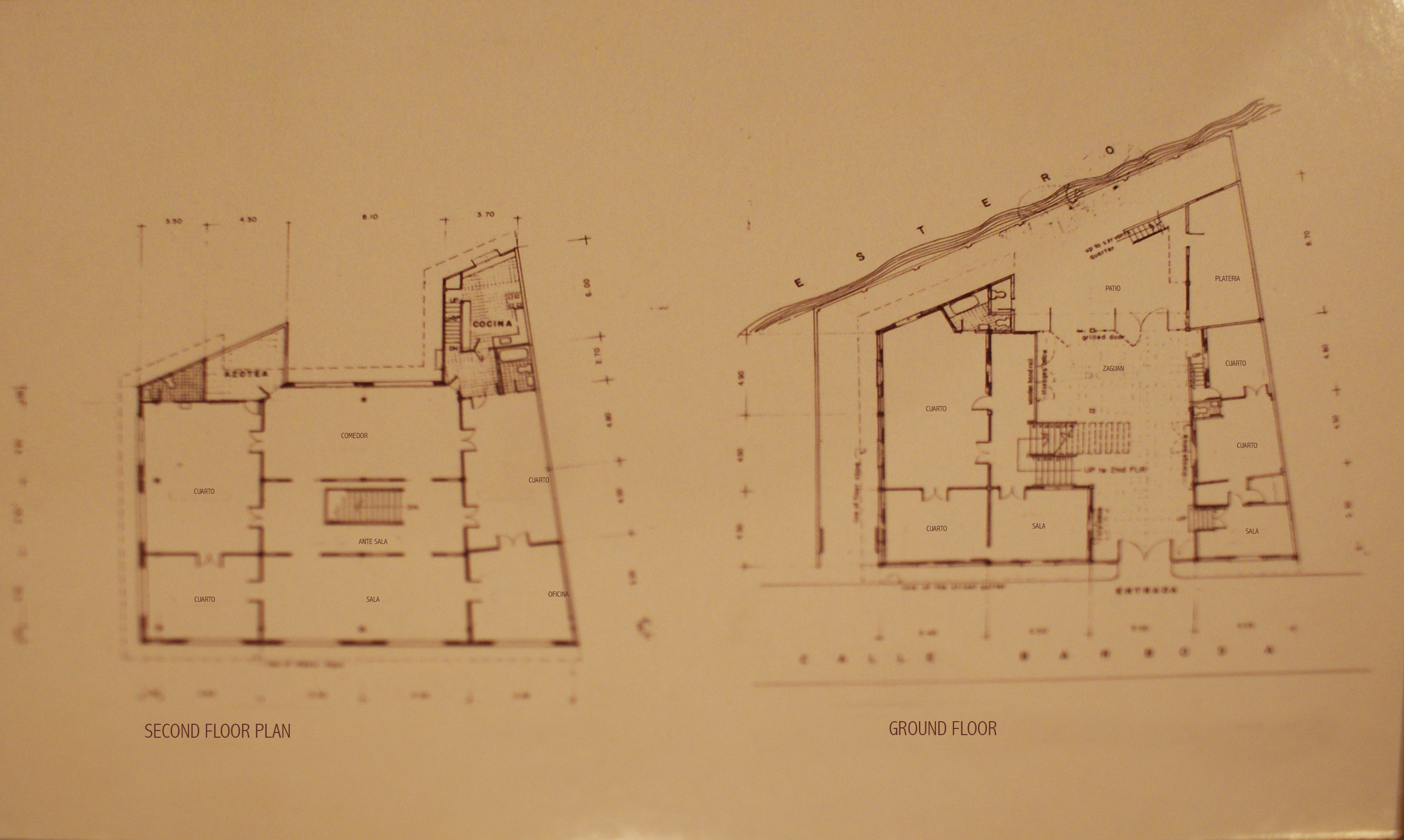
Postcard showing the floor plans of the house

The lot measures 500 square meters and had two storeys, with wood and stone as primary construction materials. The ground floor consists of the zaguan (parking area for horse-drawn carriage), cuarto (bedroom), sala (living room), patio, and the plateria (area for designing jewelry). The upper floor contains the ante sala (anteroom), sala, patio, comedor (dining room), azotea, cuarto, oficina, and cocina (kitchen). The second floor was built with wood to resist earthquakes.

The house is a bahay na bato and had two entrances, a street door and a large iron gate, typical of many Manila houses of the period. The large iron gate leads to the estero behind. The lower storey is in the wood-and-stone style post-1880. Architect and scholar Rodrigo Perez III (also known as Dom Bernardo, OSB) says that in many Filipino houses whether in the Cordillera or in the lowland countryside, “space is surrounded by space.” In a lecture at the Nakpil-Bautista house in 1999, he showed how Arellano’s creation manifests this idea. Going up the main stairway the visitor arrives at the hall, the caida, with doors on all four sides leading to the surrounding rooms, the dining room, the living room, and two suites of bedrooms. Two sets of doors slide Japanese-style to open, vistas extending from street to estero.

It does not have ornate decorative details. Its inspiration is the Vienna Secession, a style not well known in the Philippines during this time. Viennese artists of the 1890s reacted to the fashionable revival of historic styles by creating a style with a contemporary character. The Secession was thus the same as Art Nouveau. After Dr. Ariston Bautista and his wife, painter Petrona Nakpil received a gift of Secession furniture, they designed their entire house around the furniture motifs. Window grilles overlooking the estero have vertical floral stems with flowers sized to small squares, while grilles facing the street display abstract interpretation of lyres. The upper exterior wall is simply decorated with a band of square insets. On the tracery of the interior ransom walls are abstract interpretations of the kiyapo plant, which the Quiapo area is named after.

The upper storey has a museum honoring both the Nakpils and two ancestors who played a role in the Katipunan, Julio Nakpil and his wife Gregoria de Jesus. After the house was finished, Dr. Bautista designed new furniture with the same motifs and had them executed by his Pampango carpenter in residence. The original furniture was divided among the heirs in the 1970s. Some of the present pieces were commissioned to suit the museum’s purposes.

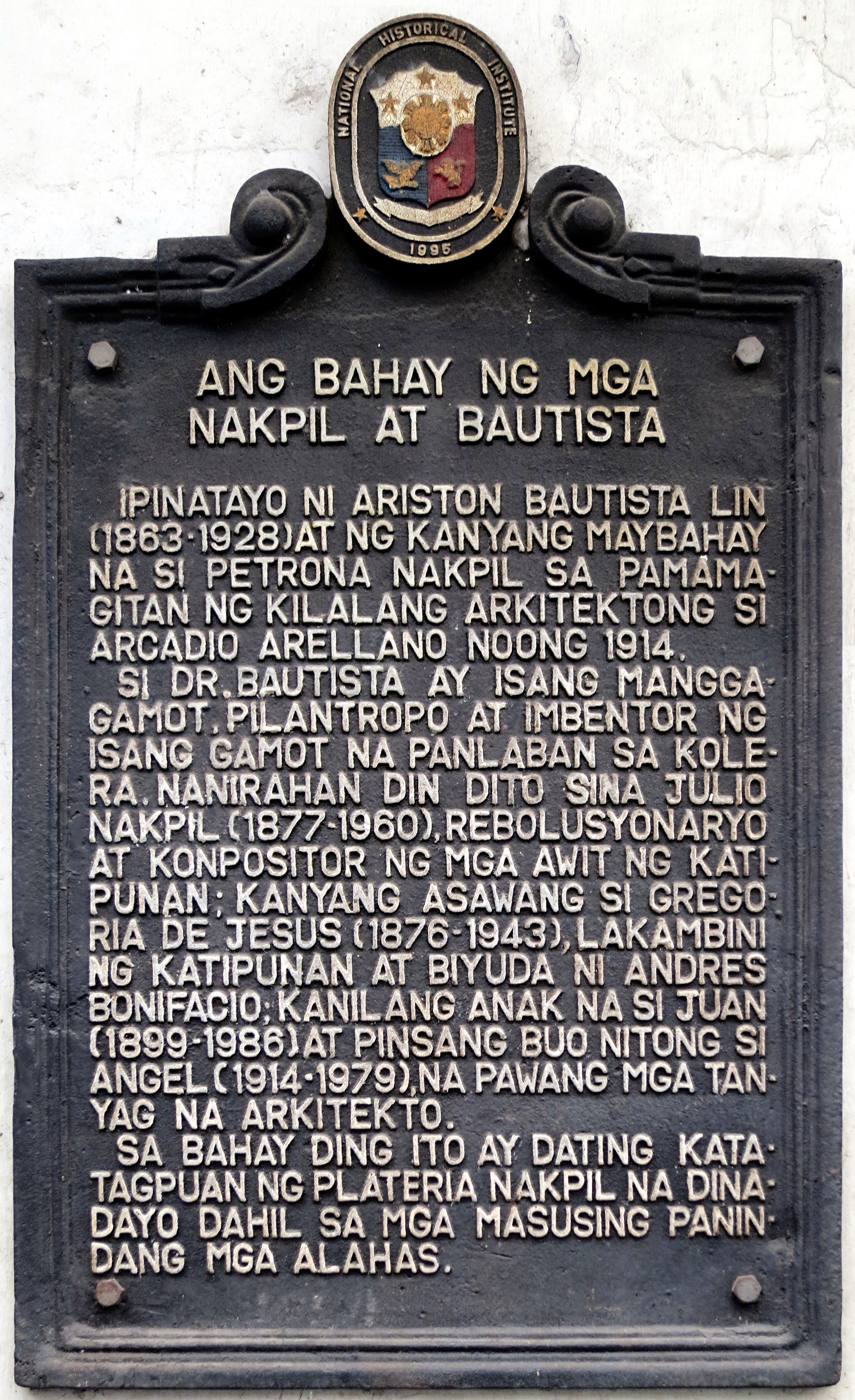
National historical marker

== Historical significance ==
Key figures in Philippine history had lived in the Nakpil-Bautista House. Among them are Dr. Ariston Bautista, one of the first professors in the University of the Philippines College of Medicine, also invented a medicine to combat cholera. Gregoria de Jesus, widow of Andres Bonifacio; later married to Julio Nakpil who was the brother of Petrona, Juan Nakpil, a National Artist for Architecture, and Angel Nakpil. The Nakpil-Bautista House also housed the original Black Nazarene statue of Quiapo Church during the World War II bombings. The Nakpil-Bautista family moved out of the house in 1960s, and it has since been adaptively reused as a community center and museum for the history of Quiapo, the Nakpil-Bautista family, and the Katipunan. The house is also next door to Boix House, another old house in Quiapo much older than Bahay Nakpil-Bautista.

It has been declared a National Historical Landmark.

== Gallery ==
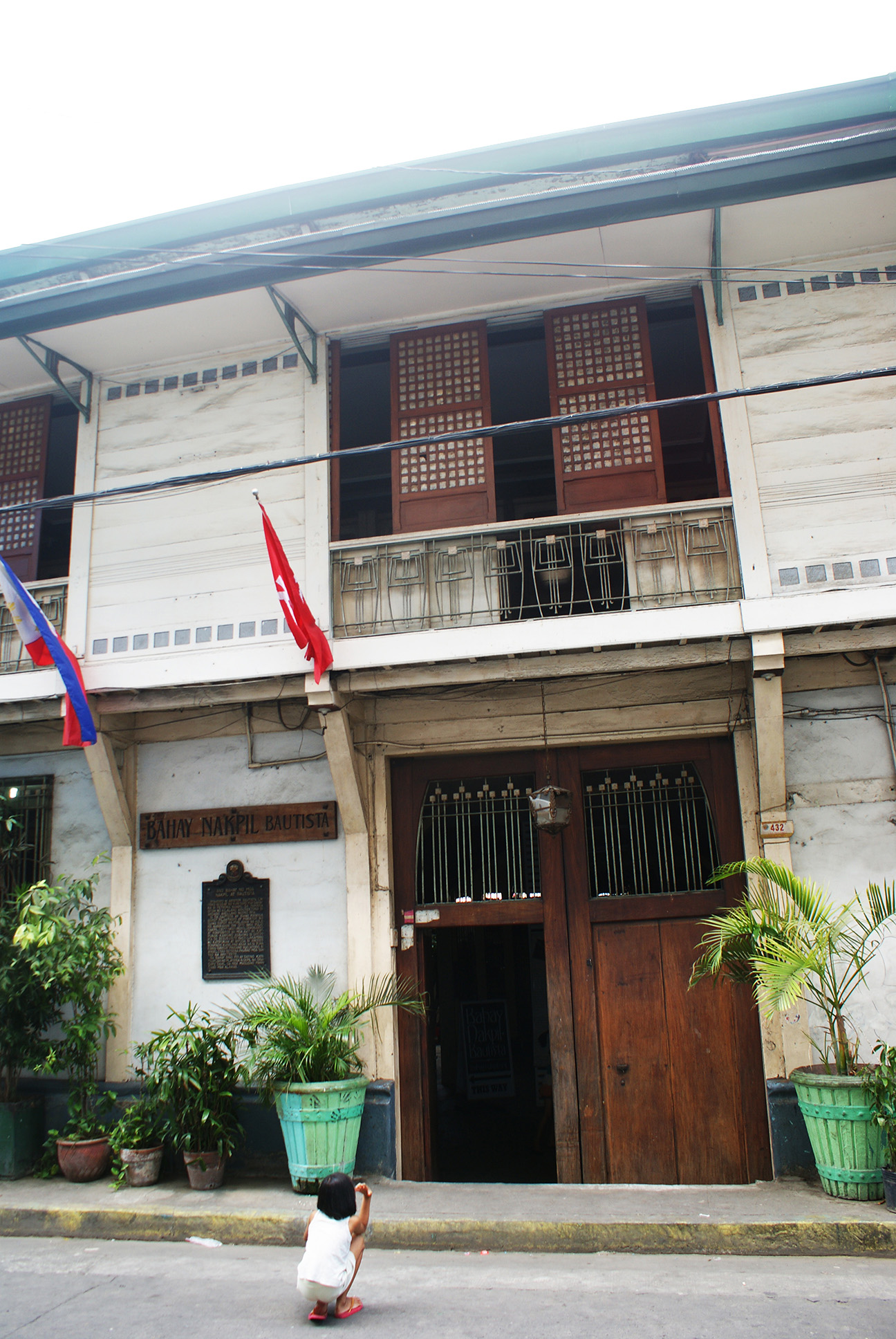
The main door

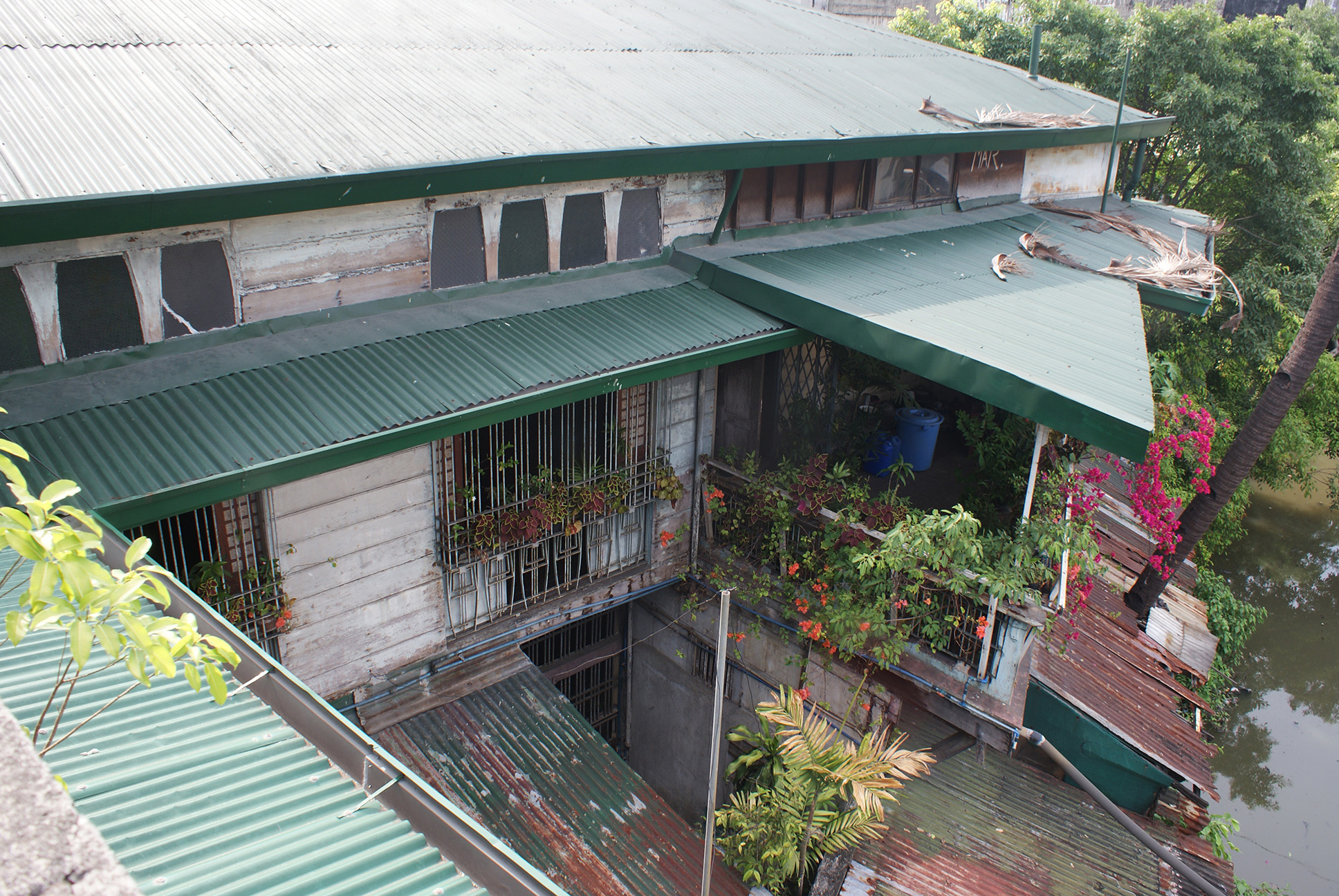
View of house from the estero

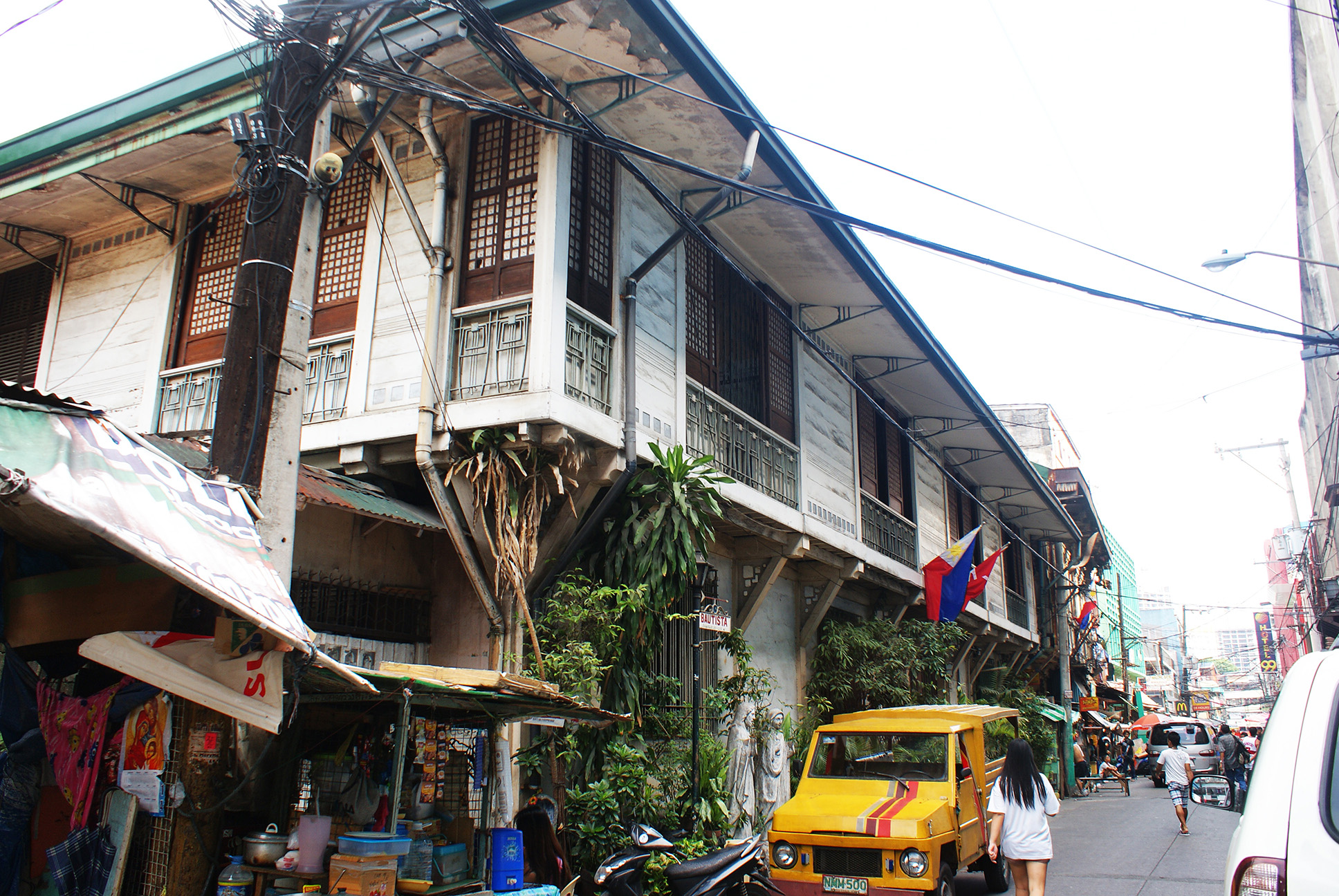
View from the street

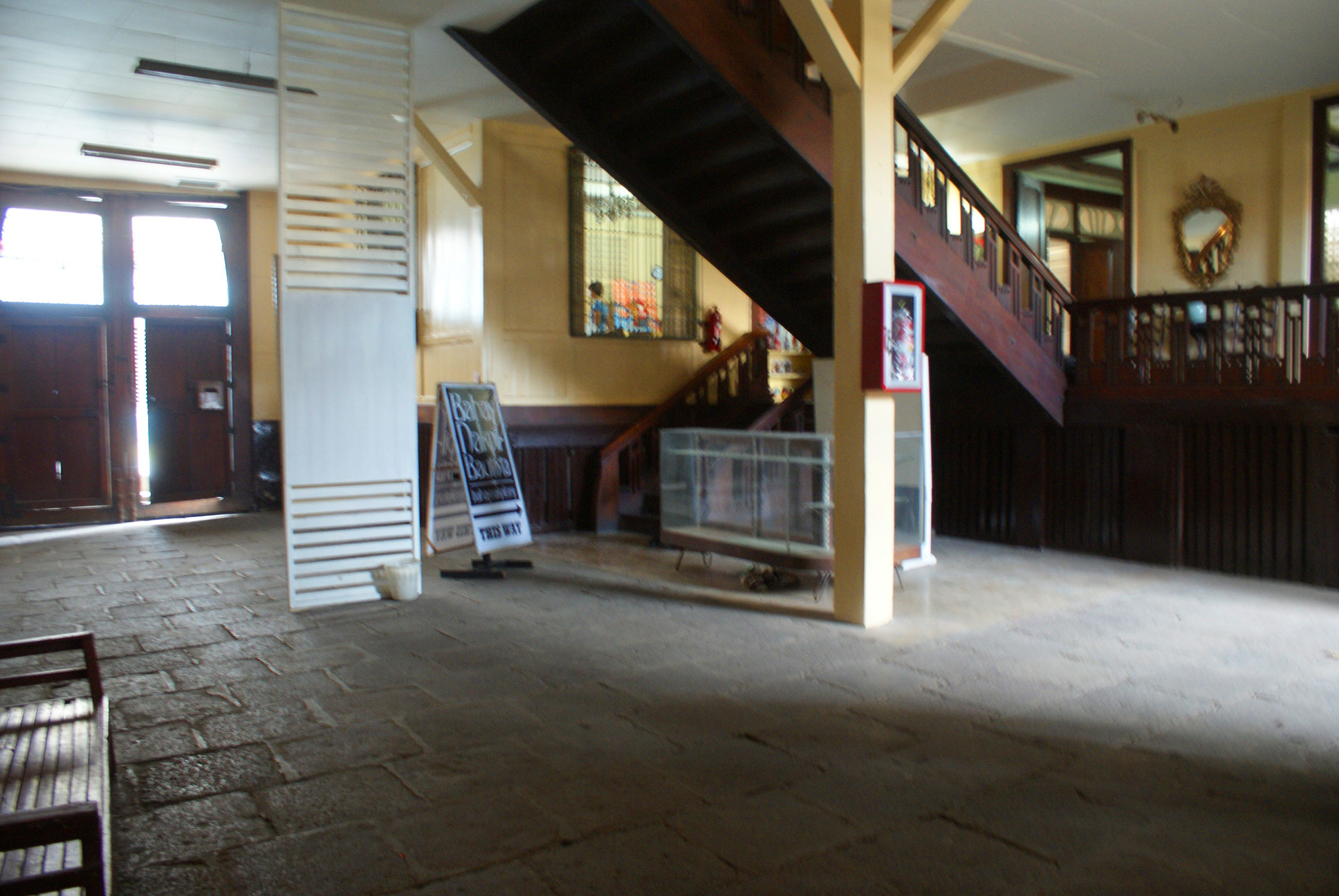
Zaguan, the parking area of horse carriage

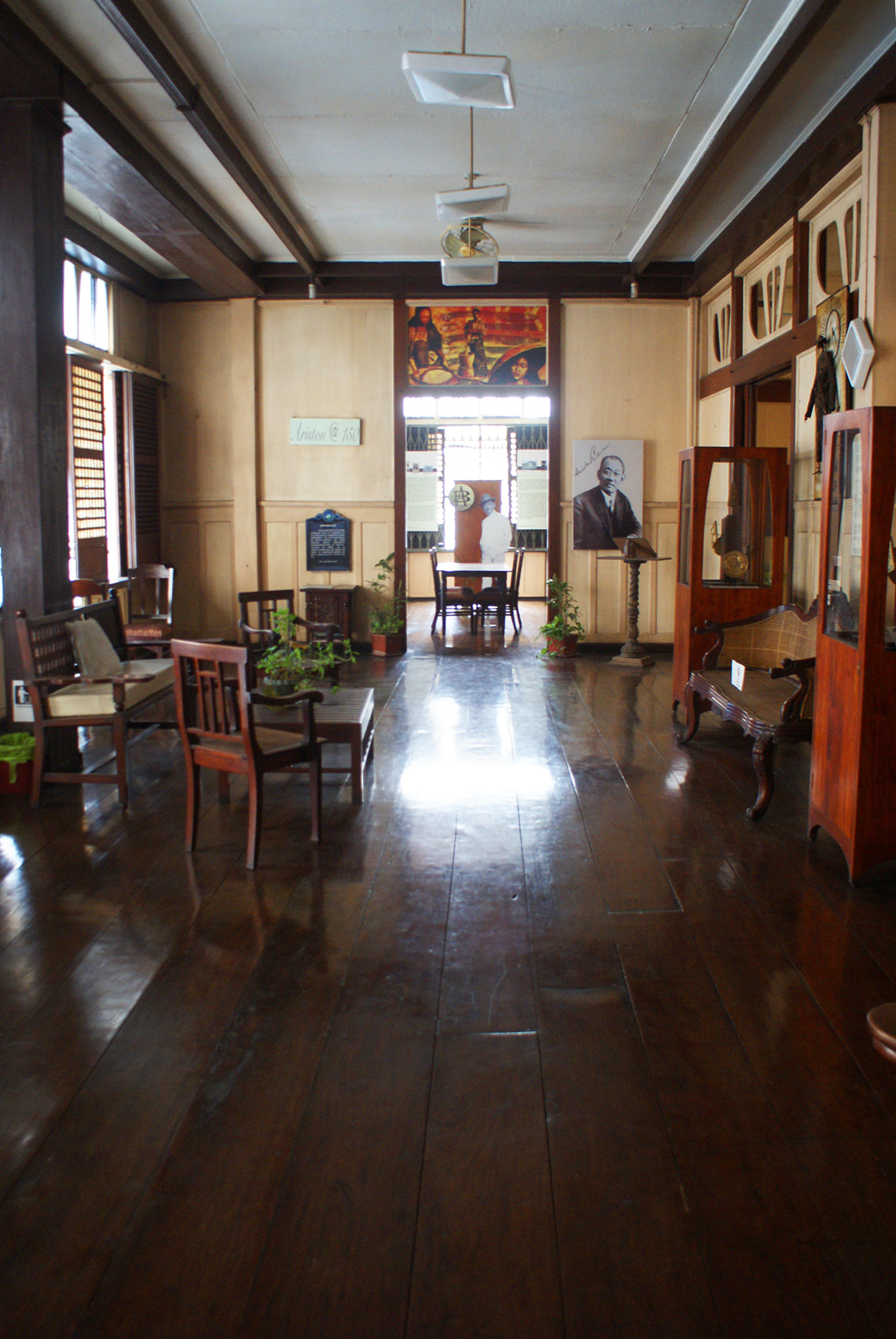
Living Room

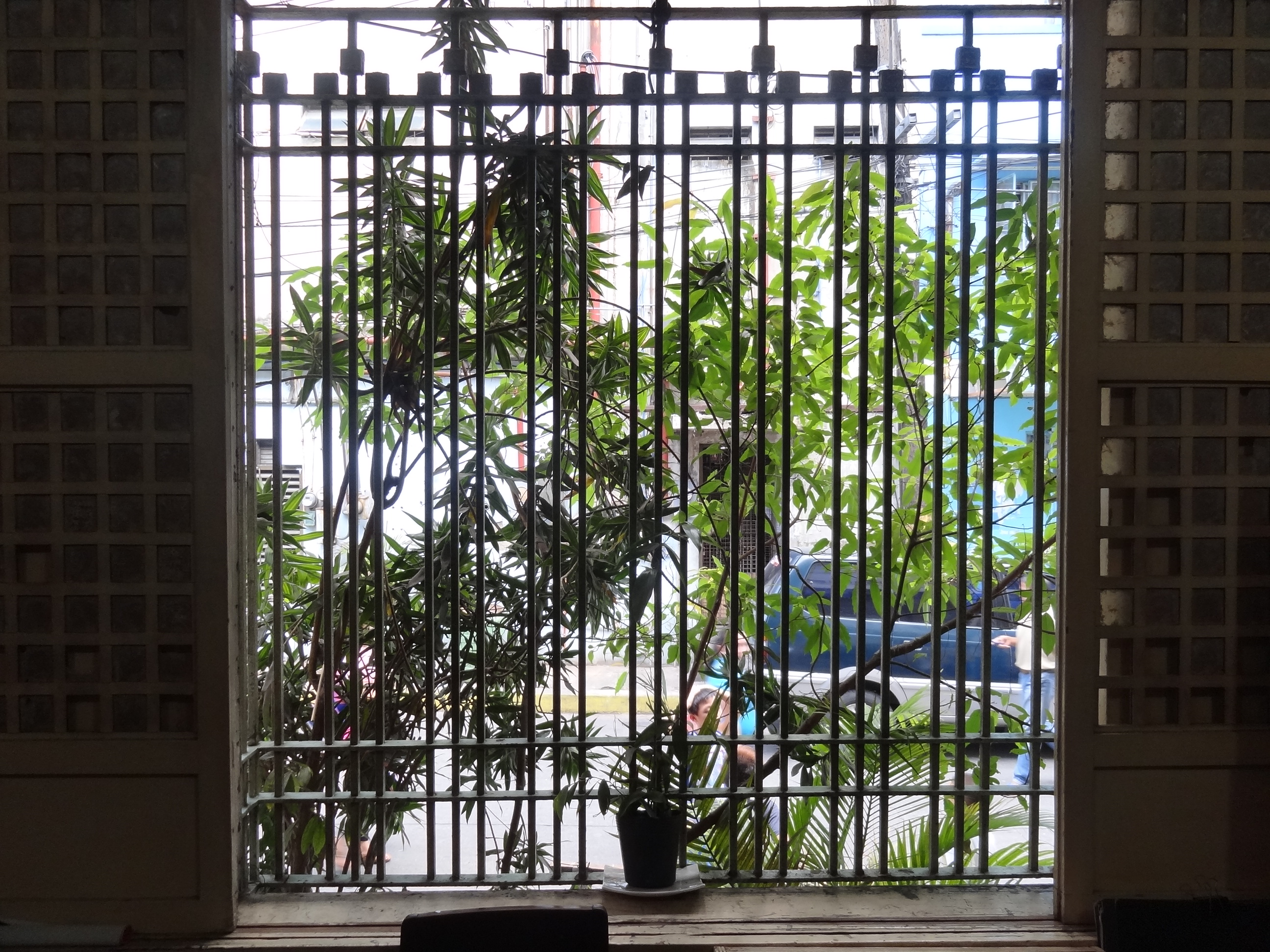
Grillwork reflects Vienna Secession style

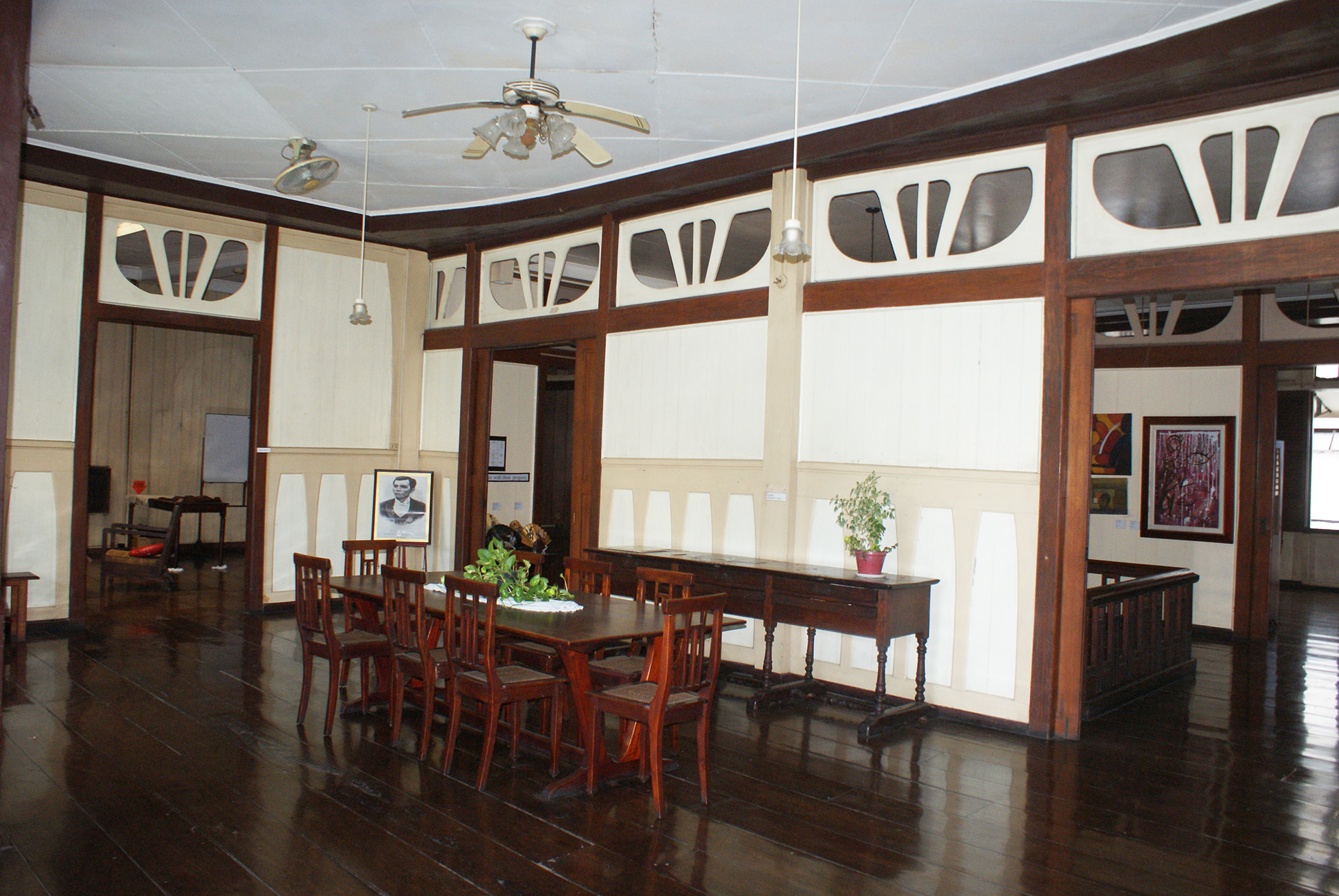
The calado is located on top of the walls, enabling cross ventilation throughout the house

== See also ==
- Philippines National Historical Landmarks
