= Boix House =

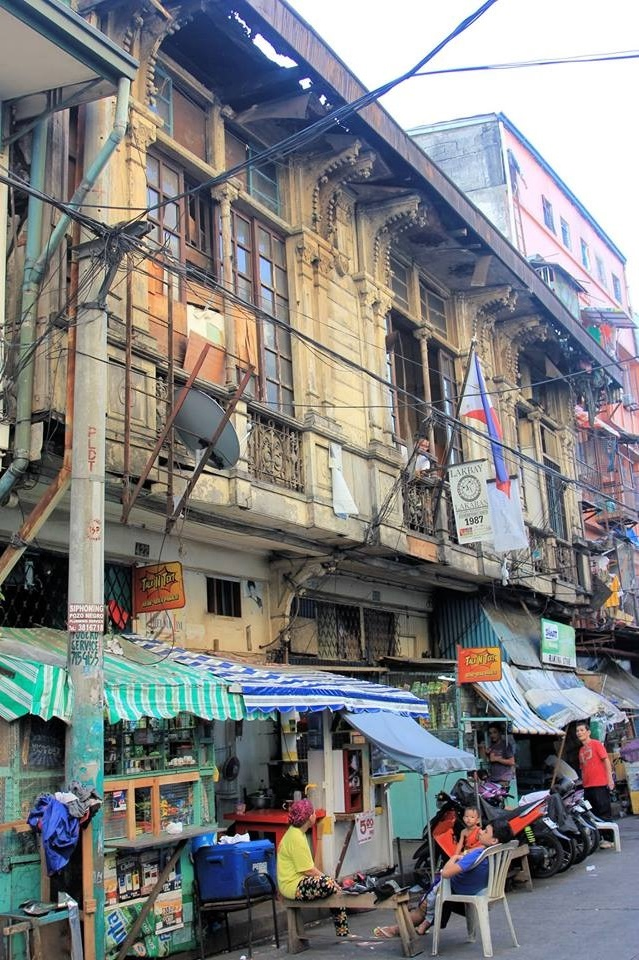
- Boix House, 28 September 2014
- Interactive map of the Boix House area
- Alternative names: Casa Boix; Teotico House; Crespo House; Teotico-Crespo House

General information
- Type: Accessoria
- Architectural style: Neo Classical
- Location: Quiapo, 434 A. Bautista Street, Quiapo, Manila, Philippines
- Coordinates: 14.59836°N 120.98466°E
- Construction started: August 24, 1895
- Owner: Society of Jesus

Height
- Architectural: Bulaklak sa trellis (Flowers in trellis)

Technical details
- Material: Stones, bricks, and wood
- Floor count: Two
- Floor area: 412 m^{2} (4,430 sq ft)

Design and construction
- Architect: Juan A. Hervas

Other information
- Number of rooms: 10 (2nd floor)

The Boix House, also known as Teotico-Crespo House or Casa Boix, is a bahay na bato heritage house located in Quiapo, Manila, the Philippines. Owned by the Philippine Province of the Society of Jesus, the restoration of the house is currently being advocated by the civic group Kapitbahayan sa Kalye Bautista.

The house typifies the bulaklak sa trellis (lit. flowers in trellis) architectural style that was common during the latter part of Spanish rule in the Philippines in the 1890s.

== History ==
=== Construction ===
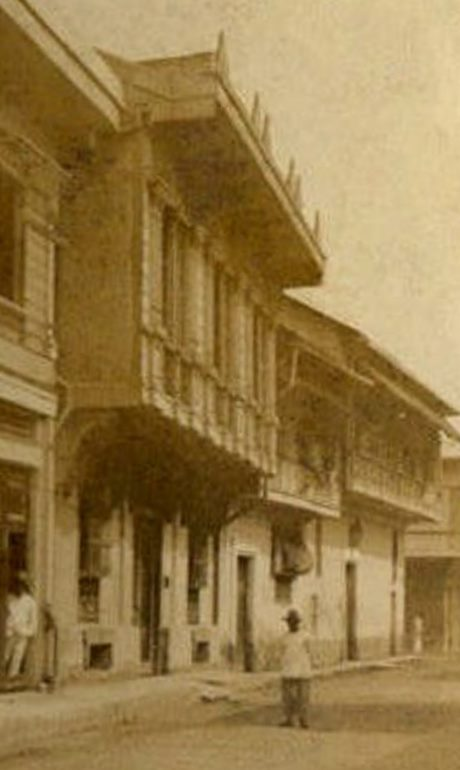
Boix House in the 1900s

The house plan of Boix House was submitted by a certain Marciano Teotico to the Superior Gobierno in Manila, dated August 24, 1895. The house was described as having two latrines, two mezzanines, a bathroom, a cellar, a coach house, a servant's quarters, and a vestibule in the ground floor. The second floor, on the other hand, was described in the plan as having two kitchens, a servant's quarters, an interior gallery, a sala (living room), a pantry, and three other rooms.

=== Post-WWII ===
The house, together with most structures on the east of Quezon Boulevard in the Quiapo district was spared from destruction caused by World War II. After the war, the house became a dormitory. The most notable resident of the house was former Philippine President Manuel Quezon, who once lived at the house during his law studies at the University of Santo Tomas. It was also believed that Quezon attended parties hosted by the Nakpil-Bautista family, who lived just next door at Bahay Nakpil-Bautista. Because of this, the house was known as the Manuel L. Quezon Dormitory.

The ground floor was eventually adaptively reused to house a printing press. The second floor of the house continued to function as a dormitory until 2008 when it was vacated.

=== Ownership history ===
The house was originally owned by the Boix-Terradellas family. Oral traditions then link it to the Crespos, after which the Boix family acquired the property. The Boix family then donated the house to the Society of Jesus.
