= Quiapo, Manila =

District of Manila, Metro Manila, Philippines

Coordinates: 14.600°N 120.983°E

Quiapo
- District of Manila
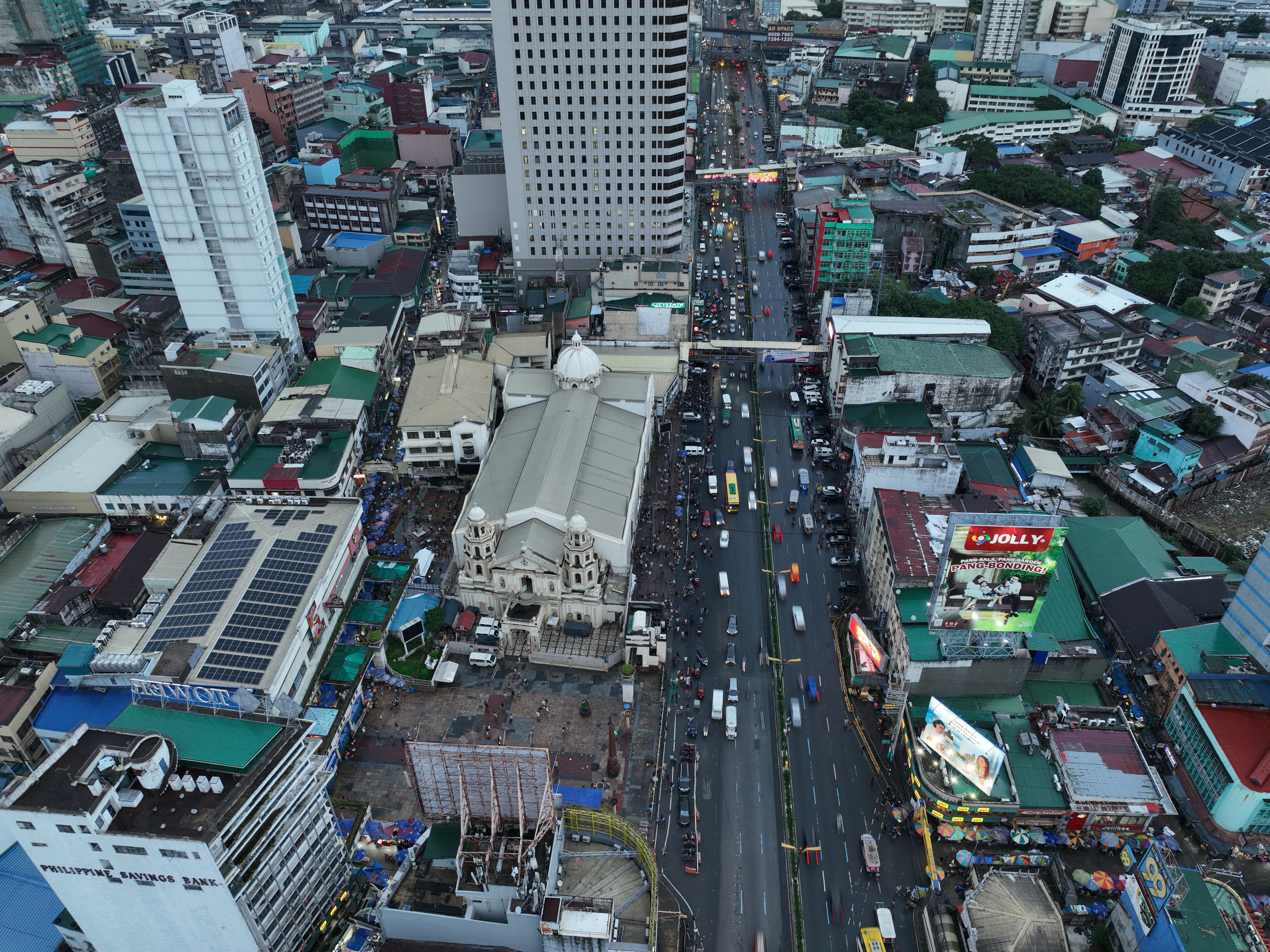
- Drone shot of Quiapo with Quiapo Church
- Country: Philippines
- Region: National Capital Region
- City: Manila
- Congressional districts: Part of the 3rd district of Manila
- Barangays: 16
- Founding Date: August 29, 1586

Area
  - Total: 0.8469 km^{2} (0.3270 sq mi)

Population (2024 census)
  - Total: 32,236
  - Density: 38,060/km^{2} (98,580/sq mi)
- Time zone: UTC+08:00 (Philippine Standard Time)
- Zip codes: 1001
- Area codes: 02

Quiapo ([ˈkjaːpɔʔ]) is a district of the city of Manila, in the National Capital Region of the Philippines. Known as the “Old Downtown of Manila", the district’s most famous landmark is Quiapo Church, a minor basilica enshrining Asia's most sacred Black Nazarene image, which has been processed every January in the historic district, attracting millions of devotees from all over the country and region. The historic district is also dotted with numerous heritage sites, ranging from ancestral and heritage houses such as those in Hidalgo Street, museums, art galleries, libraries, historic places of worship such as churches and mosques, historic cinemas, as well as historic parks and streets, many of which have been run over by informal settlers and the construction of shanty houses, as well as buildings built by corporations. Many historic sites were destroyed by both the Japanese and American colonizers during World War II without compensation or aid for reconstruction, while some post-war sites were demolished by certain corporations. In recent years, various heritage organizations, experts, and lawmakers have pushed for the re-vitalization of Quiapo as a heritage zone, including the rebuilding of lost heritage structures, the revamping of modern structures to fit the historic district's original aesthetics, as well as the planting of trees and plants and the refurnishing of streets to make the district more safe, walkable, and climate-adaptive.

Geographically located at the very center of the City of Manila, Quiapo is bounded by the Pasig River and Estero de San Miguel to the south, San Miguel district to the east, the districts of Sampaloc and Santa Cruz and Recto Avenue to the north, and the Santa Cruz district and Rizal Avenue to the west.

== Etymology ==
Quiapo's name is derived from the abundance of water cabbage (Pistia stratiotes), called kiyapo in Tagalog (spelled quiapo in Philippine Spanish) in the nearby Pasig River. The town of Cuyapo in Nueva Ecija is also named after the same plant.

== History ==
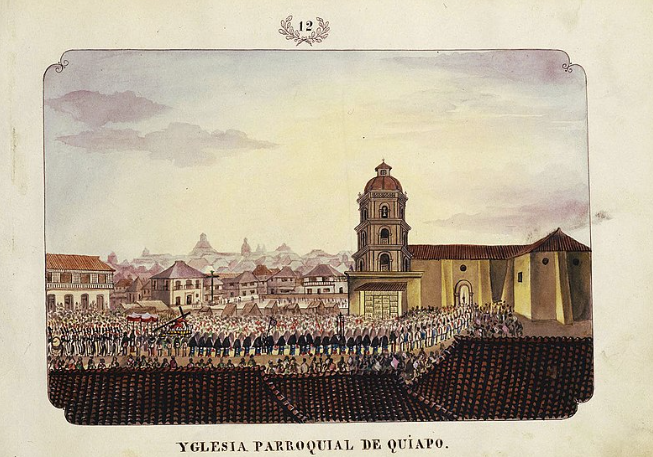
Feast of the Black Nazarene, Quiapo Church, as painted by José Honorato Lozano, 19th century.

Pre-1800 maps of Manila show that Quiapo, historically a poor fishing village, was originally a cluster of islands with marshlands and shallow waters. In 1578, Franciscans arrived and established their main missionary headquarters in nearby Santa Ana de Sapa, taking Quiapo as part of its visita (chapel-of-ease). They founded Quiapo Church and dedicated it to Saint John the Baptist. The Jesuits later arrived in 1581.

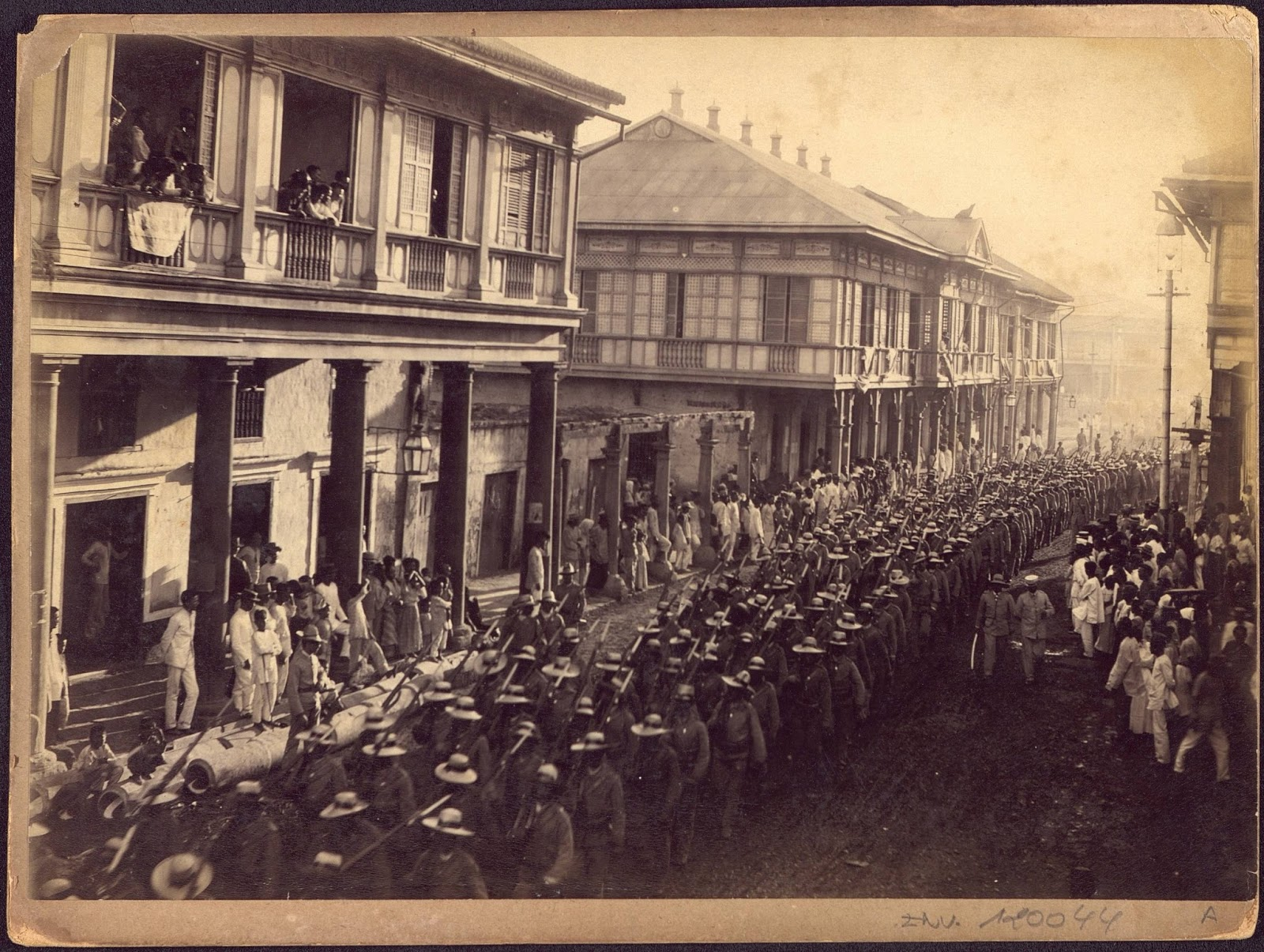
Parade of Soldiers at Calle San Sebastian (now Hidalgo Street), Manila. Known for its Colonnaded Bahay na bato that lined its street.

Franciscan prelate Pedro Bautista petitioned to make Quiapo a separate town. The petition was finally granted by Governor-General Santiago de Vera on August 29, 1586. In 1622, Augustinians arrived and founded a chapel in honor of St. Sebastian at the present-day site of the San Sebastian Basilica. By 1850, then a small agricultural village, population of Quiapo grew as a result of a developing economy in the wake of the Manila galleon trade's termination and the subsequent opening of the country to world trade in 1830. Newly rich mestizos started settling in Quiapo, as well as many rich Europeans, including Spanish army officers.

Quiapo had become a wealthy suburb. Since the American insular government and commonwealth periods through to the late 1970s, it shared its status as the center of the activities of Manila's social elites as well as trade, fashion, art and higher learning with its surrounding vicinity (Avenida Rizal, Santa Cruz, Escolta and the University Belt). However, with the construction of the Manila Light Rail Transit System's LRT-1 spanning over Rizal Avenue, the occlusion of light, the trapping of smog and vehicle emissions left the streets beneath dark, gloomy and with an increase in crime and transients. Consequently, many long-time establishments vacated the area. The vibrancy of Quiapo diminished further during the martial law era due to the economic downfall of the country, which caused social unrest. Sections of the district became important in the success of the 1986 People Power Revolution. Open spaces in the district was filled by makeshift markets to accommodate visitors to the Quiapo Church.

== Community ==
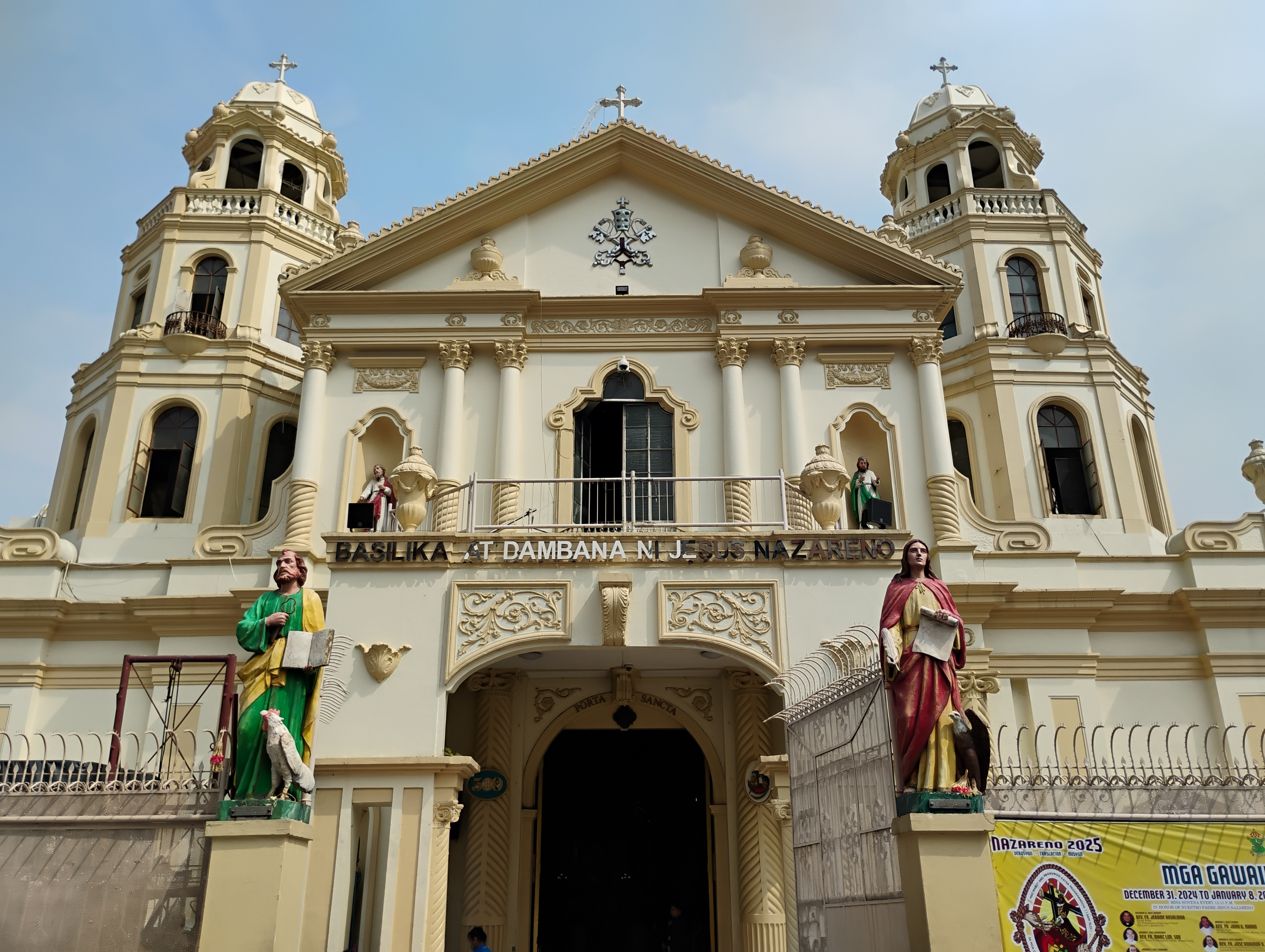
Quiapo Church

Plaza Miranda, in the heart of the Quiapo district, is a town square named after Jose Sandino y Miranda, who served as secretary of the treasury of the Philippines from 1853 to 1863. It is located in front of the Quiapo Church, and has become a popular site for political rallies. On August 21, 1971, while the Liberal Party held its miting de avance in the plaza, a bomb exploded, killing nine and injuring almost 100 civilians.

The Quiapo district is also home to a sizable Muslim population. The Golden Mosque and Green Mosque are located here.

Stores offering herbal products, and a large population of self-described fortune tellers, surround the Quiapo church. Thievery and sales of illegally copied media are prevalent in the district.

In recent years, the local government of Manila, spearheaded by then-Mayor Lito Atienza, launched the Buhayin ang Maynila ("Revitalize Manila") project which greatly rehabilitated Quiapo and its vicinities, most especially Plaza Miranda, Quinta Market, the Arsenio Lacson Underpass and the University Belt. Parts of Rizal Avenue, starting from Carriedo Street to Recto Avenue, were converted into pedestrian shopping arcades.

== Heritage Zone ==
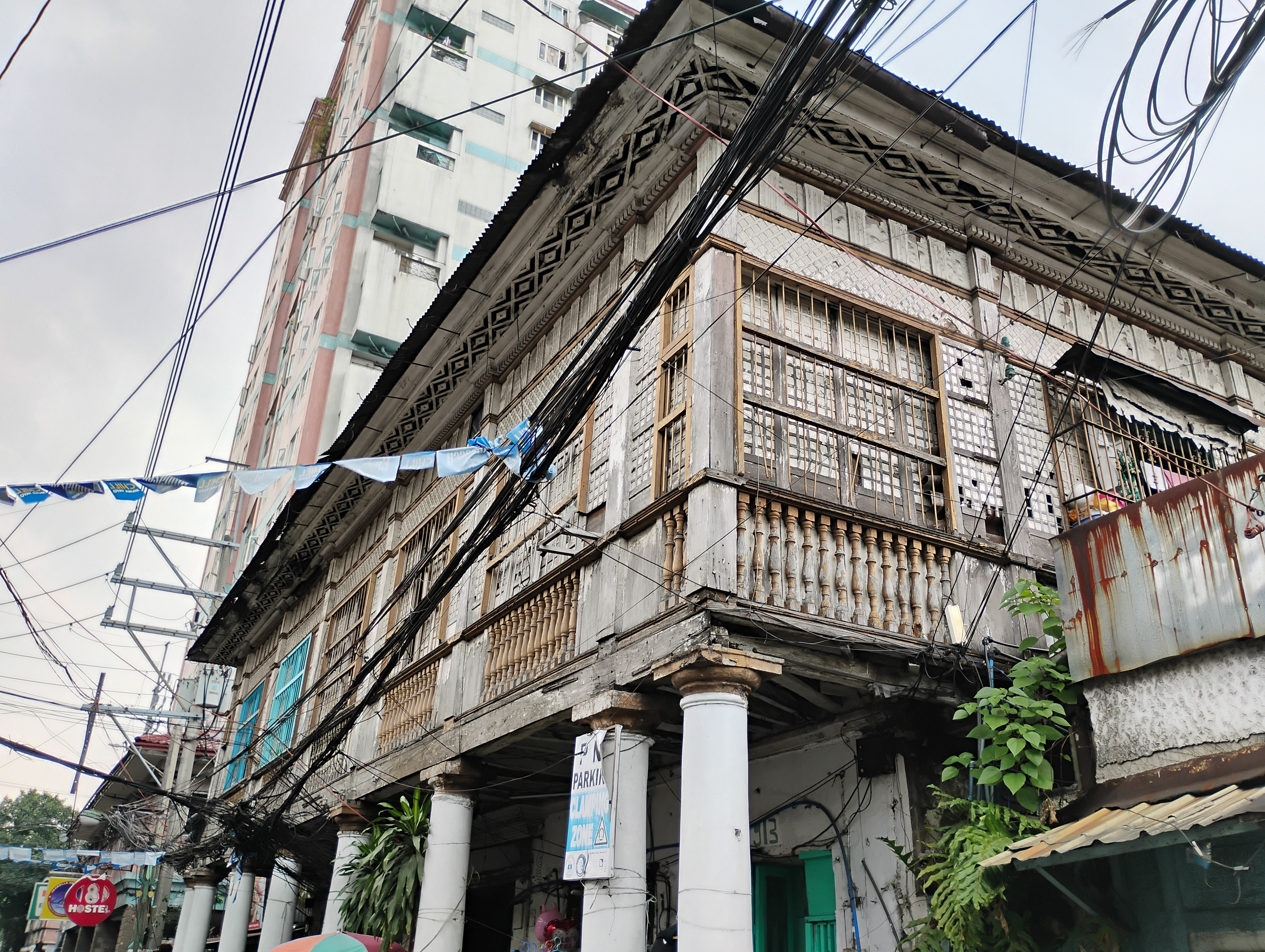
Heritage house

The district of Quiapo is currently being pushed and debated in both the House of Representatives and in the Senate to be declared as a heritage zone. The declaration and legislation would protect the district's numerous heritage sites, from bahay-na-bato structures, the Quiapo Church, San Sebastian Church, the historical universities within it, the Buddhist and Islamic places of worship, and its historical parks and streets, among others. It is also proposed that the district be pushed as a UNESCO World Heritage site once the district has been declared a heritage zone and that the district undergoes renovations and reconstructions that would amplify its heritage zone designation, following guidelines by cultural experts.

In the Senate version of the bill being pushed to recognize Quiapo as a heritage zone, some of the heritage sites recognized included, but not limited to, the following: Minor Basilica of the Black Nazarene, Minor Basilica of San Sebastian, Masjid Al-Dahab, Plaza del Carmen, Plaza Miranda, Quinta Market, Nakpil-Bautista House, Paterno House, Zamora House, Estrella House, Genato House, Zaragoza House, Casa Consulado, Ocampo-Santiago House, Ocampo Pagoda Mansion, Padilla Art Gallery, Casa Boix (Boix House), La Estricista Site, Calle Hidalgo (Hidalgo Street), Calle Argelui, Calle Bautista, V. Calle Bilibid Viejo, Calle de Guzman, and Globo de Oro Street. The intangible cultural heritage emanating from the district was also included as part of the heritage zone, such as the religious rituals, fortune telling traditions, and ancient medical practices of the locals.

== Barangays ==
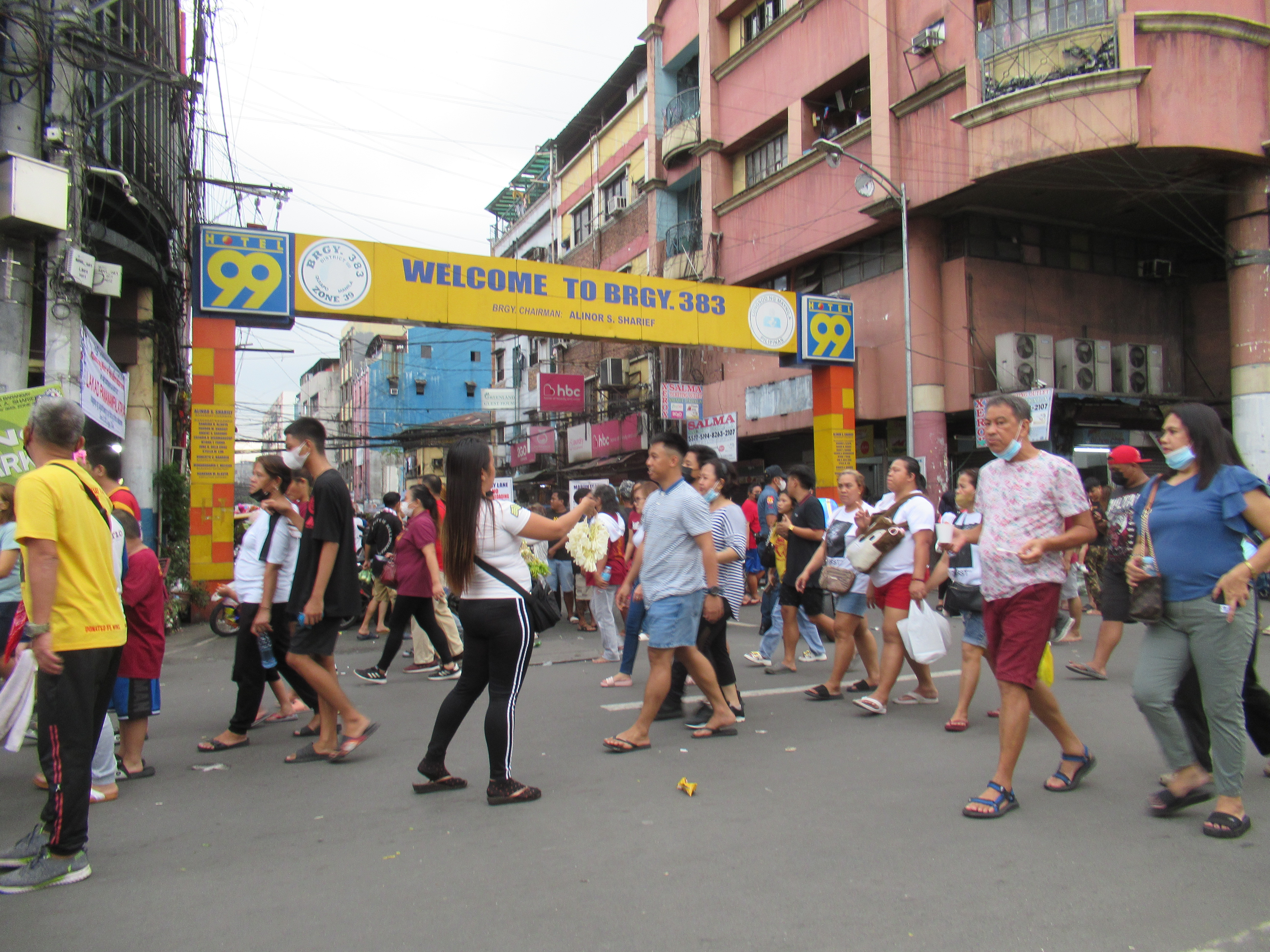
Welcome arch of Barangay 383

Quiapo contains 16 barangays. Barangays 306 to 309 are part of Zone 30 of the City of Manila, while Barangays 383 to 388 are of Zone 39, and Barangays 389 to 394 are of Zone 40.

| Barangay | Land area (km^{2}) | Population (2024 census) |
Zone 30
| Barangay 306 | 0.1013 | 1,273 |
| Barangay 307 | 0.07246 | 1,399 |
| Barangay 308 | 0.04002 | 965 |
| Barangay 309 | 0.06061 | 1,162 |
Zone 39
| Barangay 383 | 0.02049 | 2,529 |
| Barangay 384 | 0.058606 | 3,830 |
| Barangay 385 | 0.07433 | 3,549 |
| Barangay 386 | 0.07397 | 1,245 |
| Barangay 387 | 0.03622 | 2,678 |
| Barangay 388 | 0.02522 | 1,553 |
Zone 40
| Barangay 389 | 0.04103 | 1,788 |
| Barangay 390 | 0.06551 | 900 |
| Barangay 391 | 0.06377 | 2,633 |
| Barangay 392 | 0.02962 | 1,115 |
| Barangay 393 | 0.09322 | 4,130 |
| Barangay 394 | 0.02663 | 1,487 |

== Popular culture ==
Quiapo was the plot setting for the 1986 film Batang Quiapo and its television adaptation and the episode Paa of the 2010 horror film Cinco.

In the film No Other Woman, Quiapo was referenced as a place where there are lots of snatchers/pickpockets in relation to the protagonist's husband's affair. The exact quote arguably had become a meme.

== Notable people ==
- Ariel Rivera
- Julio Nakpil
- Rosemarie Gil

== See also ==
- Hidalgo Street
