= 2015 FAMAS Awards =

Annual Filipino film awards ceremony

63rd FAMAS Awards
- Date: September 20, 2015
- Site: Newport Performing Arts Theater, Resorts World Manila
- Hosted by: Sam Concepcion, Coleen Garcia
- Produced by: Airtime Marketing, Inc.

Highlights
- Best Picture: Bonifacio: Ang Unang Pangulo

Television coverage
- Network: ABS-CBN
- Duration: 1 hour and 30 minutes

The 63rd Filipino Academy of Movie Arts and Sciences Awards Night was held at the Newport Performing Arts Theater inside the Resorts World Manila in Pasay on September 20, 2015 with the theme "Throwback Glam Day, A Look Back At Six Glorious Decades of Philippine Cinema". The awards night was hosted by Sam Concepcion and Coleen Garcia, it was aired on ABS-CBN's "Sunday's Best" at 11:30pm on September 27, 2015.

== Awards ==
=== Major Awards ===
Winners are listed first and highlighted with boldface.

Best Picture	Best Director
**Bonifacio: Ang Unang Pangulo (Philippians Productions & Entertainment Inc., Tuko Film Productions, Buchi Boy Films, and RCP Productions)**; Asintado (Ignacio Films); Feng Shui 2 (Star Cinema & Kris Aquino Production); Hustisya (Likhang Silangan Entertainment); Kamkam (Heaven's Best Entertainment); Magkakabaung (ATD Entertainment Productions); Muslim Magnum .357: To Serve and Protect (Scenema Concept International & Viva Films); She's Dating The Gangster (Star Cinema); Starting Over Again (Star Cinema); The Trial (Star Cinema)	**Enzo Williams (Bonifacio: Ang Unang Pangulo)**; Cathy Garcia-Molina (She's Dating the Gangster); Chito Roño (Feng Shui 2); Chito Roño (The Trial); Francis Posadas (Muslim Magnum .357: To Serve and Protect); Jason Paul Laxamana (Magkakabaung); Joel Lamangan (Hustisya); Joel Lamangan (Kamkam); Luisito Ignacio (Asintado); Olivia Lamasan (Starting Over Again)
Best Actor	Best Actress
**Allen Dizon for Magkakabaung**; Allen Dizon for Kamkam; Coco Martin for Feng Shui 2; Daniel Padilla for She's Dating The Gangster; Derek Ramsay for English Only, Please; George "E.R. Ejercito" Estregan for Muslim Magnum .357: To Serve and Protect; Jake Vargas for Asintado; John Lloyd Cruz for The Trial; Piolo Pascual for Starting Over Again; Robin Padilla for Bonifacio: Ang Unang Pangulo; Rocco Nacino for Hustisya	**Toni Gonzaga for Starting Over Again**; Aiko Melendez for Asintado; Gladys Reyes for Magkakabaung; Gretchen Barretto for The Trial; Jean Garcia for Kamkam; Jennylyn Mercado for English Only Please; Kathryn Bernardo for She's Dating the Gangster; Kris Aquino for Feng Shui 2; Sam Pinto for Muslim Magnum .357: To Serve and Protect; Vina Morales for Bonifacio: Ang Unang Pangulo
Best Supporting Actor	Best Supporting Actress
**Gabby Eigenmann for Asintado**; Emilio Garcia for Magkakabaung; Ian Veneracion for Feng Shui 2; Jim Pebangco for Kamkam; Lito Pimentel for Starting Over Again; Richard Gomez for She's Dating the Gangster; Richard Gomez for The Trial; Roi Vinzon for Muslim Magnum .357: To Serve and Protect; Romnick Sarmenta for Hustisya	**Sylvia Sanchez for The Trial**; Carmi Martin for Feng Shui 2; Chanel Latorre for Magkakabaung; Dawn Zulueta for She's Dating the Gangster; Iza Calzado for Starting Over Again; Jasmine Curtis Smith for Bonifacio: Ang Unang Pangulo; Rita de Guzman for Asintado; Rosanna Roces for Hustisya; Sunshine Dizon for Kamkam
Best Child Performer	Best Screenplay
**Miggs Cuaderno for Asintado**; Alonzo Muhlach for My Big Bossing; Clarence Delgado for Muslim Magnum .357: To Serve and Protect; Felixia Crysten Dizon for Magkakabaung; James "Bimby" Aquino-Yap for The Amazing Praybeyt Benjamin; Raikko Mateo for Feng Shui 2; Ryzza Mae Dizon for My Big Bossing	**Ricardo Lee, Enrico Santos and Kriz Gazmen for The Trial**; Socorro Villanueva for Asintado; Enzo Williams and Keiko Aquino for Bonifacio: Ang Unang Pangulo; Roy Iglesias and Chito Roño for Feng Shui 2; Ricardo Lee for Hustisya; Jerry Gracio for Kamkam; Jason Paul Laxamana for Magkakabaung; Cathy Camarilo for Muslim Magnum .357: To Serve and Protect; Carmi Raymundo and Olivia Lamasan for Starting Over Again
Best Cinematography	Best Production Design
**Carlo Mendoza for Bonifacio: Ang Unang Pangulo**; Dan Villegas for She's Dating the Gangster; Hermann Claravall for Starting Over Again; Lee Briones Meily for Kamkam; Luisito Ignacio for Asintado; Manuel Teehankee for The Trial; Nap Jamir for Hustisya; Neil Daza for Feng Shui 2; Rain Yamson for Magkakabaung; Ricardo Buhay for Muslim Magnum .357: To Serve and Protect	**Roy Lachica and Joel Bilbao for Bonifacio: Ang Unang Pangulo**; Cyrus Khan for Asintado; Cyrus Khan for Magkakabaung; Edgar Martin Littaua for Hustisya; Edgar Martin Littaua for Kamkam; Sharie Marie Montiague for She's Dating the Gangster; Sharie Marie Montiague for Starting Over Again; Winston Acuyong for Feng Shui 2; Winston Acuyong for The Trial
Best Editing	Best Story
**Carlo Francisco Manatad for Feng Shui 2**; Benjamin Tolentino for Bonifacio: Ang Unang Pangulo; Carlo Francisco Manatad for Asintado; Carlo Francisco Manatad for The Trial; Jason Paul Laxamana for Magkakabaung; John Anthony Wong for Kamkam; Marya Ignacio for She's Dating the Gangster; Marya Ignacio for Starting Over Again; Melvin Quimosing for Bonifacio: Ang Unang Pangulo; Vanessa De Leon for Hustisya	**Ricardo Lee, Enrico Santos, and Kriz Gazmen for The Trial**; Carmi Raymundo and Charlene Bernardo for She's Dating the Gangster; Carmi Raymundo, Anjeli Pessumal and Olivia Lamasan for Starting Over Again; Cathy Camarillo for Muslim Magnum .357: To Serve and Protect; Enzo Williams, Carlo Obispo and Keiko Aquino for Bonifacio: Ang Unang Pangulo; Ferdinand Lapuz and Jason Paul Laxamana for Magkakabaung; Jerry Gracio for Kamkam; Ricardo Lee for Hustisya; Roy Iglesias and Chito Roño for Feng Shui 2; Socorro Villanueva for Asintado
Best Sound	Best Musical Score
**Addiss Tabong for Feng Shui 2**; Addiss Tabong for The Trial; Albert Michael Idioma for Asintado; Albert Michael Idioma for Bonifacio: Ang Unang Pangulo; Aurel Claro Bilbao for She's Dating the Gangster; Aurel Claro Bilbao for Starting Over Again; Junel Valencia for Magkakabaung; Lamberto Casas Jr. for Hustisya; Lamberto Casas Jr. for Kamkam	**Cesar Francis Concio for She's Dating the Gangster**; Carmina Cuya for Feng Shui 2; Cesar Francis Concio for Starting Over Again; Cesar Francis Concio for The Trial; Danny Tan and Sherwin Castillo for Asintado; Diwa De Leon for Magkakabaung; Emerzon Texon for Hustisya; Emerzon Texon for Kamkam; Michael Abadam and John Angeles for Starting Over Again; Von De Guzman for Bonifacio: Ang Unang Pangulo
Best Theme Song	Best Visual Effects
**Hindi Pa Tapos for Bonifacio: Ang Unang Pangulo**; Asintado by Gloc 9 for Asintado; Kapayapaan by Datu Khomeini Bansuan for Muslim Magnum .357: To Serve and Protect; Wag Ka Nang Umiyak for The Trial, Lyrics and Music by Ebe Dancel, Interpreted by KZ Tandingan	**Erick Torrente for Muslim Magnum .357: To Serve and Protect**; Aileen Cornejo-Castillo for Starting Over Again; Dodge Ledesma for Feng Shui 2; Dodge Ledesma for The Trial; Orlean Joseph Tan for She's Dating the Gangster

=== Special awards ===
**Iconic Movie Queens of Philippine Cinema**

- Gloria Romero
- Susan Roces
- Nora Aunor
- Maricel Soriano
- Dawn Zulueta
- Sarah Geronimo

**German Moreno Youth Achievement Award**

- Bianca Umali
- Diego Loyzaga
- Jasmine Curtis Smith
- Kiko Estrada
- Kim Rodriguez
- Mark Neumann
- Miguel Tanfelix
- Nadine Lustre
- Robi Domingo
- Sofia Andres

**Face of the Night**

- Richard Gutierrez
- Toni Gonzaga

**FAMAS Lifetime Achievement Award**

- Tito, Vic, and Joey

**Fernando Poe Jr. Memorial Award**

- Coco Martin

**Public Service Award**

- Julius Babao and Kaye Dacer of DZMM's Aksyon Ngayon

**Dr. Jose Perez Memorial Award**

- Lhar Santiago

**Arturo M. Padua Memorial Award**

- Emy Abuan

**Film Critics Choice Award**

- Esoterika: Manila

**FAMAS Presidential Award**

- Doctor Bong Ramirez
