= 2014 Metro Manila Film Festival =

Annual Philippine Festival edition

2014 Metro Manila Film Festival 40th Metro Manila Film Festival
- Awards: Gabi ng Parangal (lit. 'Awards Night')
- No. of films: 8
- Festival date: December 25, 2014 to January 7, 2015

MMFF chronology
- 41st ed. 39th ed.

The 40th Metro Manila Film Festival was the edition of the annual film festival that is held in Metro Manila, Philippines and is organized by the Metropolitan Manila Development Authority (MMDA). During the film festival, no foreign films are shown in Philippine cinemas and theaters (except IMAX theaters) in order to showcase locally produced films. The film festival began on December 23, 2014, and was kicked off by the yearly Parade of Stars' float parade starting from the Quirino Grandstand. The festival ran until January 7, 2015.

The awards night commenced on December 27, 2014 at the Philippine International Convention Center, and was hosted by Edu Manzano and Kris Aquino. It was also aired via delayed telecast on ABS-CBN.

== Official entries ==
The official list of entries were announced on June 21, 2014. From the 13 submissions, 8 were chosen for the festival;

Title	Starring	Studio	Director	Genre
The Amazing Praybeyt Benjamin	Vice Ganda, Richard Yap, Tom Rodriguez, Alex Gonzaga, Bimby Aquino-Yap	Star Cinema & Viva Films	Wenn Deramas	Comedy, action
Bonifacio: Ang Unang Pangulo	Robin Padilla, Vina Morales, Daniel Padilla	Philippians Productions	Enzo Williams	Historical drama, action
English Only, Please	Jennylyn Mercado, Derek Ramsay	Quantum Films, Buchi Boy Films & Tuko Film Productions and MJM Productions	Dan Villegas	Romantic comedy
Feng Shui 2	Kris Aquino, Coco Martin	Star Cinema and K Productions	Chito Roño	Horror
Kubot: The Aswang Chronicles 2	Dingdong Dantes, Isabelle Daza, Joey Marquez, KC Montero, Lotlot de Leon	Reality Entertainment, GMA Films and AgostoDos Pictures	Erik Matti	Comedy, horror, action
Muslim Magnum .357: To Serve and Protect	ER Ejercito, Sam Pinto	Scenema Concept International and Viva Films	Francis "Jun" Posadas	Action
My Big Bossing	Ryzza Mae Dizon, Vic Sotto, Marian Rivera, Nikki Gil, Alonzo Muhlach	OctoArts Films, M-Zet Productions and APT Entertainment	Joyce Bernal, Marlon Rivera & Tony Reyes	Comedy, Fantasy
Shake, Rattle & Roll XV	JC de Vera, Erich Gonzales, Dennis Trillo, Carla Abellana, Lovi Poe, Matteo Guidicelli	Regal Entertainment	Dondon Santos, Jerrold Tarog and Perci Intalan	Horror anthology

== New Wave entries ==
MMDA started to accept entries for the New Wave category until October 7, 2014. On October 24, 2014, the official list of entries were announced. Films were screened on selected cinemas from December 17 to 24, 2014.

Title	Starring	Studio	Director	Genre
Gemini	Sheena McBride, Brigitte McBride, Mon Confiado, Lance Raymundo, Alvin Anson, Sarah Gaugler	Blackswan Pictures	Ato Bautista	Psychological thriller
M (Mother's Maiden Name)	Zsa Zsa Padilla, Nico Antonio, Dennis Padilla, Gloria Sevilla	Eight Films	Zig Madamba Dulay	Drama
Magkakabaung	Allen Dizon, Gladys Reyes, Chanel Latorre, Emilio Garcia	ATD Entertainment Productions	Jason Paul Laxamana	Drama
Maratabat: Pride and Honor	Julio Diaz, Ping Medina, Chanel Latorre	Blank Pages Productions	Arlyn dela Cruz	Political drama
Mulat	Jake Cuenca, Ryan Eigenmann, Loren Burgos	Dvent Productions	Maria Diane Ventura	Drama, romance

=== Student shorts ===
- Bimyana - Kim Zuñiga, De La Salle–College of Saint Benilde
- Bundok Chubibo - Glenn Barit, University of the Philippines Diliman
- Kalaw - Immy Belle Rempis, Asia Pacific Film Institute
- Kubli - Regine Ynieto, Far Eastern University
- Siyanawa - Gio Alpuente, Southern Luzon State University
- Ang Soltera - Arielle Louise Naguit, De La Salle Lipa

=== Animated films ===
- Cherry - Dustin Uy
- Gymsnatch - Eric Dequitos
- Isip-Bata - Eugene Ceriola & Keith Bercero
- An Maogmang Lugar - Mary Ann Espedido
- Shifter - Jerico Fuentes

== Awards ==
2014 Metro Manila Film Festival Gabi ng Parangal
- Date: December 27, 2014
- Site: Philippine International Convention Center, Pasay
- Hosted by: Edu Manzano and Kris Aquino

Highlights
- Best Picture: Bonifacio: Ang Unang Pangulo
- Most awards: Bonifacio: Ang Unang Pangulo (9)

Television coverage
- Network: ABS-CBN

=== Major awards ===
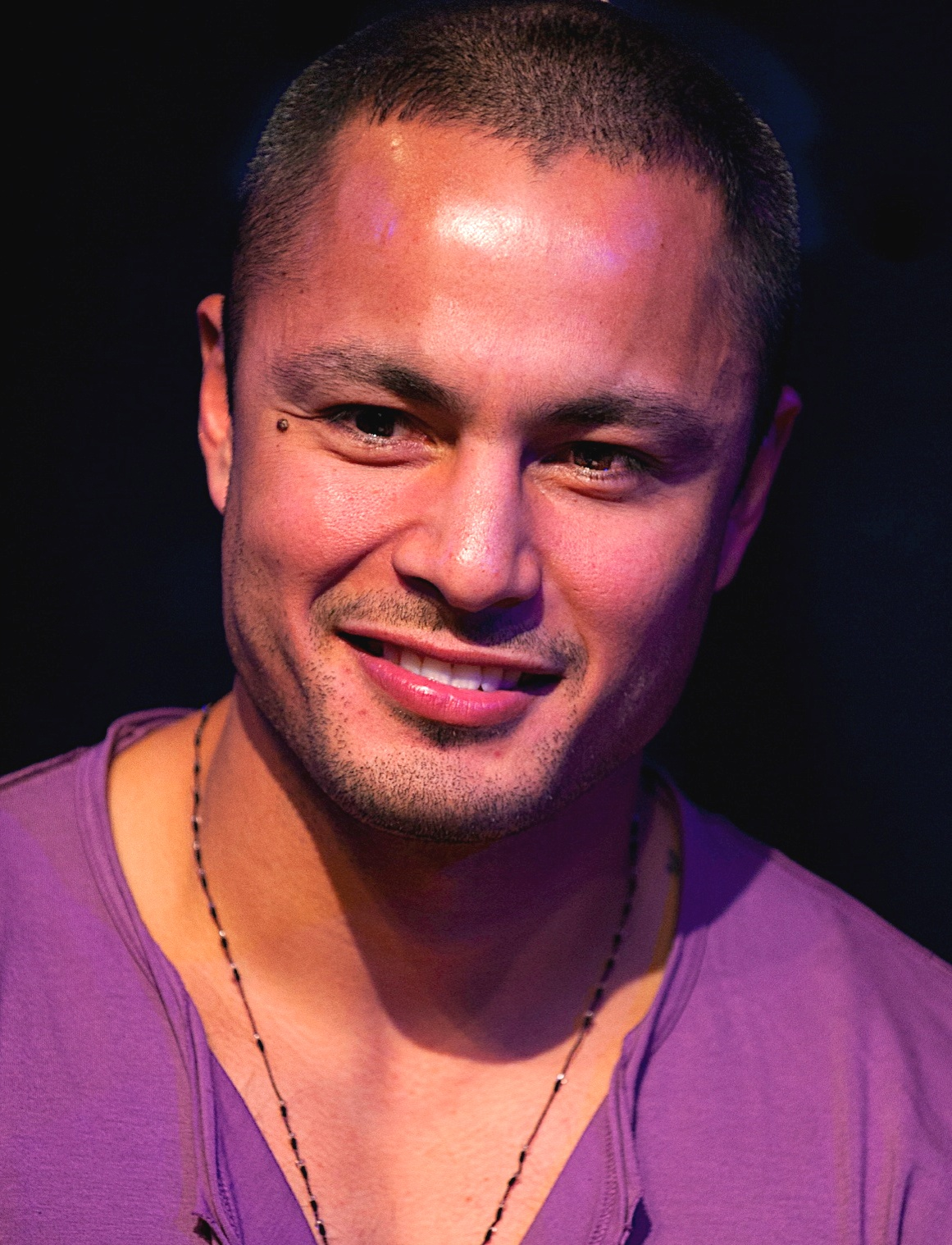
Derek Ramsay, Best Actor winner

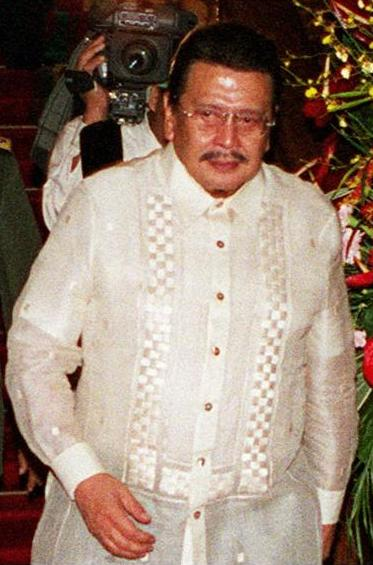
Joseph Estrada, Commemorative Award for Vision and Leadership recipient

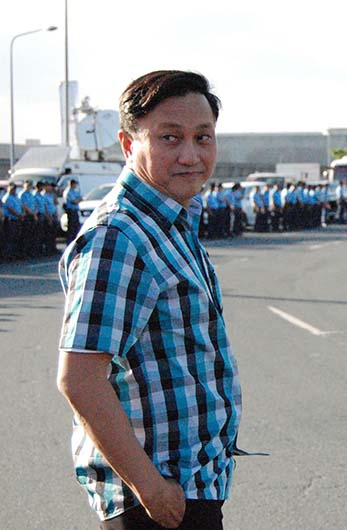
Francis Tolentino, Special MMFF 40th Year Award recipient

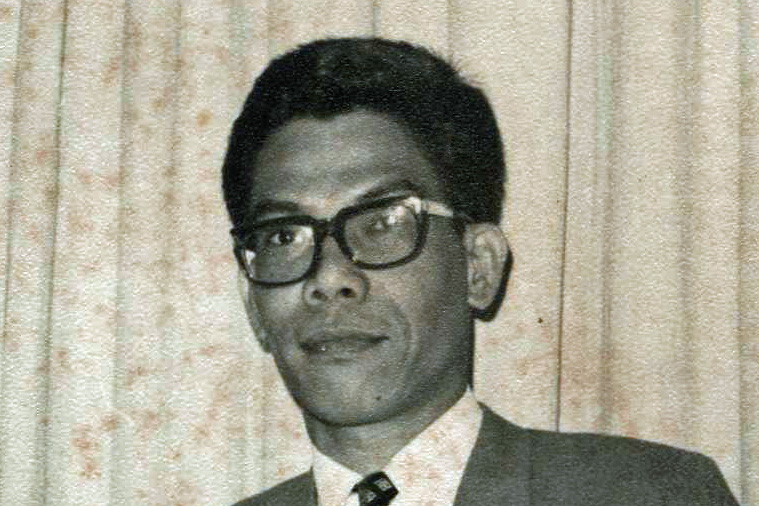
Guillermo de Vega, Special Recognition Award (posthumous) recipient

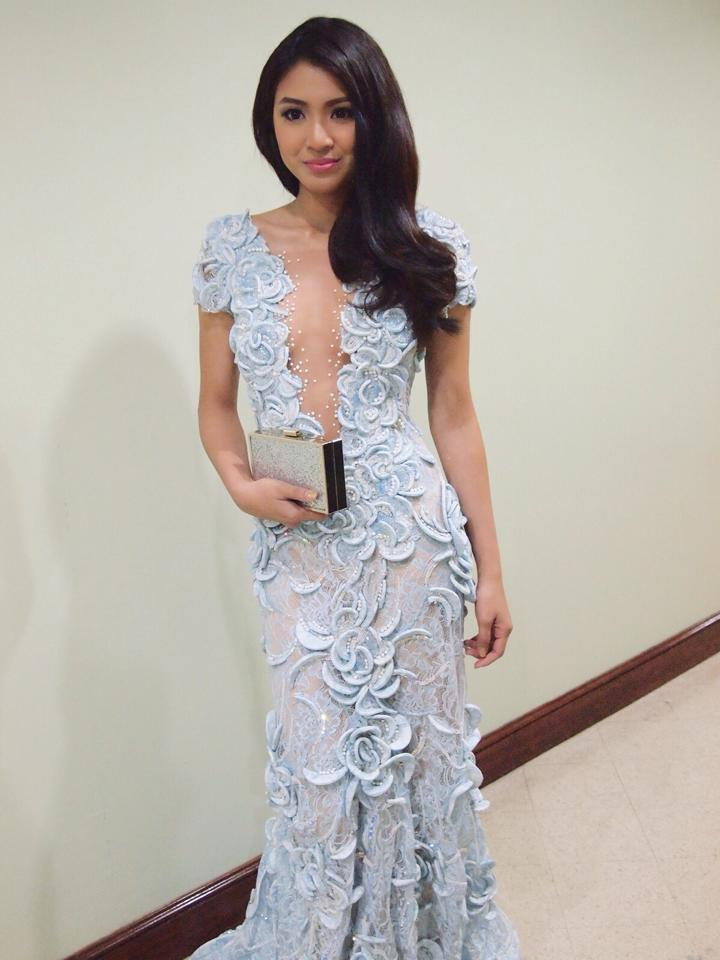
Nadine Lustre, Face of the Night recipient

The following are the winners of the mainstream category:

Best Picture	Best Director
Bonifacio: Ang Unang Pangulo – Philippians Productions; English Only, Please – Quantum Films, Buchi Boy Films & Tuko Film Productions (2nd Best Picture); Kubot: The Aswang Chronicles 2 – Reality Entertainment, GMA Films & Agostodos Productions (3rd Best Picture); Feng Shui 2 – Star Cinema & K Productions; My Big Bossing – OctoArts Films, M-Zet Films & APT Entertainment; Shake, Rattle & Roll XV – Regal Entertainment	Dan Villegas – English Only, Please; Erik Matti – Kubot: The Aswang Chronicles 2; Chito S. Roño – Feng Shui 2; Jerrold Tarog – Shake, Rattle & Roll XV (Ulam); Enzo Williams – Bonifacio: Ang Unang Pangulo
Best Actor	Best Actress
Derek Ramsay – English Only, Please as Julian Parker; Dingdong Dantes – Kubot: The Aswang Chronicles 2 as Makoy; Coco Martin – Feng Shui 2 as Lester Anonuevo; Robin Padilla – Bonifacio: Ang Unang Pangulo as Andrés Bonifacio	Jennylyn Mercado – English Only, Please as Tere Madlansacay; Carla Abellana – Shake, Rattle & Roll XV (Ulam) as Aimee; Erich Gonzales – Shake, Rattle & Roll XV (Ahas) as Sandra/Sarah; Vina Morales – Bonifacio: Ang Unang Pangulo as Gregoria de Jesús
Best Supporting Actor	Best Supporting Actress
Joey Marquez – Kubot: The Aswang Chronicles 2 as Nestor; Sef Cadayona – My Big Bossing (Prinsesa); Kean Cipriano – English Only, Please as Rico; Jose Manalo – My Big Bossing (Taktak); Roi Vinzon – Muslim Magnum .357: To Serve and Protect as Bng. Gen. Gideon de Tagle	Lotlot de Leon – Kubot: The Aswang Chronicles 2 as Nieves; Cai Cortez – English Only, Please as Mallows; Nikki Gil – My Big Bossing (Prinsesa) as Prinsesa Reyna Beatriz; Carmi Martin – Feng Shui 2 as Ruby Anonuevo; Chanda Romero – Shake, Rattle & Roll XV (Ulam) as Aling Lina
Best Child Performer	Best Cinematography
Ryzza Mae Dizon – My Big Bossing as Jessa, Angel and Victoria; Clarence Delgado – Muslim Magnum .357: To Serve and Protect as Niko; Lenlen Frial – English Only, Please as Kay-Kay; Mona Louise Rey – Kubot: The Aswang Chronicles 2 as batang aswang	Carlo Mendoza – Bonifacio: Ang Unang Pangulo; Shing-Fung Cheung – Kubot: The Aswang Chronicles 2; Neil Daza – Feng Shui 2; Lito Mempin & Lee Meily – My Big Bossing (Taktak); Dan Villegas – English Only, Please
Best Screenplay	Best Original Story
Antoinette Jadaone & Anjeli Pessumal – English Only, Please; Cathy Camarillo – Muslim Magnum .357; Bibeth Orteza – My Big Bossing (Prinsesa); Shugo Praico & Enzo Williams – Bonifacio: Ang Unang Pangulo; Michiko Yamamoto & Erik Matti – Kubot: The Aswang Chronicles 2	Antoinette Jadaone & Dan Villegas – English Only, Please; Bonifacio: Ang Unang Pangulo; Erik Matti – Kubot: The Aswang Chronicles 2; Rody Vera – Shake, Rattle & Roll XV (Ahas)
Best Production Design	Best Editing
Ericson Navarro – Kubot: The Aswang Chronicles 2; Winston Acuyong – Feng Shui 2; Roy Lachica – Bonifacio: Ang Unang Pangulo; Mitoy Sta. Ana – My Big Bossing (Prinsesa)	Marya Ignacio – English Only, Please; Vito Cajili & Sheryll Lopez – Kubot: The Aswang Chronicles 2; Carlo Francisco Manatad – Feng Shui 2; Benjamin Tolentino – Bonifacio: Ang Unang Pangulo; Benjamin Tolentino – Shake, Rattle & Roll XV (Flight 666)
Best Visual Effects	Best Make-up Artist
Mothership – Kubot: The Aswang Chronicles 2; Digital Dodge – My Big Bossing (Taktak); Imaginary Friends Studio – Shake, Rattle & Roll XV (Ahas); Post Manila – Bonifacio: Ang Unang Pangulo	Juvan Bermil & Charles Albert Alabado – Kubot: The Aswang Chronicles 2; Cheryl Cabanos – Feng Shui 2; English Only, Please; Jayvee Flores, Insiang Piñero & Bambbi Fuentes – My Big Bossing (Prinsesa); Shake, Rattle & Roll XV (Ulam)
Best Original Theme Song	Best Musical Score
"Hindi Pa Tapos" from Bonifacio: Ang Unang Pangulo – Gloc-9; "Kapayapaan" from Muslim Magnum .357: To Serve and Protect; "Bukas Na" from My Big Bossing – Jan Ilacad	Von de Guzman – Bonifacio: Ang Unang Pangulo; Carmina Cuya – Feng Shui 2; Von de Guzman – Shake, Rattle & Roll XV (Flight 666); Armi Millare – English Only, Please; My Big Bossing (Prinsesa); Erwin Romulo – Kubot: The Aswang Chronicles 2
Best Sound Engineering	Gatpuno Antonio J. Villegas Cultural Award
Wild Sound – Bonifacio: Ang Unang Pangulo; Albert Michael Idioma – My Big Bossing; Live Sound & Hit Productions – Kubot: The Aswang Chronicles 2; Addiss Tabong – English Only, Please; Lamberto Casas Jr. – Shake, Rattle & Roll XV (Ulam)	Bonifacio: Ang Unang Pangulo; English Only, Please; Muslim Magnum .357: To Serve and Protect
Best Float	Fernando Poe Jr. Memorial Award for Excellence
Bonifacio: Ang Unang Pangulo	Bonifacio: Ang Unang Pangulo
Youth Choice Award
Bonifacio: Ang Unang Pangulo

==== Other awards ====
- Commemorative Award for Vision and Leadership – Joseph Estrada
- Special MMFF 40th Year Award – Francis Tolentino
- Special Recognition Award (posthumous) – Guillermo de Vega; accepted by wife Maria de Vega
- Face of the Night – Nadine Lustre

=== New Wave category ===
The following are the winners of the New Wave category:

- Best Picture – Magkakabaung
- Best Director – Jason Paul Laxamana, Magkakabaung
- Best Actor – Allen Dizon, Magkakabaung
- Best Actress – Zsa Zsa Padilla, M (Mother's Maiden Name)
- Best Supporting Actor – Kristoffer King, Maratabat (Pride and Honor)
- Best Supporting Actress – Gloria Sevilla, M (Mother's Maiden Name)
- Special Jury Prize – M (Mother's Maiden Name)
- Best Student Film – Bundok Chubibo by Glenn Barit
- Student Film Special Jury Prize – Kalaw by Immy Rempis
- Best Animation Film – An Maogmang Lugar by Mary Espedido
- Animation Film Special Jury Prize – Cherry by Dustin Uy

== Multiple awards ==
=== Mainstream ===
Awards	Film
9	Bonifacio: Ang Unang Pangulo
7	English Only, Please
6	Kubot: The Aswang Chronicles 2

=== New Wave ===
Awards	Film
3	M (Mother's Maiden Name)
3	Magkakabaung

== Box office gross ==
The Metropolitan Manila Development Authority was criticized for releasing incomplete official earnings of each film. This led to some film studios releasing their own earnings.

Entry	Gross Ticket Sales	
Entry	December 25	January 7
The Amazing Praybeyt Benjamin	₱ 53,300,000*	₱ 402,000,000*
Feng Shui 2	₱ 31,400,000	–
My Big Bossing	₱ 28,000,000	–
English Only, Please	–	–
Kubot: The Aswang Chronicles 2	₱ 11,000,000	–
	TOTAL	₱ 1,014,000,000

Preceded by 2013 Metro Manila Film Festival	Metro Manila Film Festival; 2014	Succeeded by 2015 Metro Manila Film Festival
