= Feng Shui (2004 film) =

Film by Chito S. Roño

- Theatrical release poster
- Directed by: Chito S. Roño
- Written by: Roy Iglesias; Chito S. Roño
- Produced by: Tess V. Fuentes
- Starring: Kris Aquino
- Cinematography: Neil Daza
- Edited by: Vito Cajili
- Music by: Carmina Cuya
- Production company: Star Cinema
- Distributed by: ABS-CBN Film Productions
- Release date: September 15, 2004 (Philippines)
- Running time: 107 minutes
- Country: Philippines
- Language: Filipino
- Box office: ₱170 million

Feng Shui is a 2004 Filipino supernatural horror film directed by Chito S. Roño from a story and screenplay he co-wrote with Roy C. Iglesias. Starring Kris Aquino, it centers on a cursed bagua mirror that brings death to those who stare at it, with the circumstances of their death relating to their Chinese zodiac.

Produced and distributed by Star Cinema, the film was theatrically released on September 15, 2004, in Dolby Digital, grossed ₱170 million at the box office, and was the highest-grossing film of 2004 in the Philippines. A sequel, Feng Shui 2, was released on December 25, 2014, as the official entry to the 40th Metro Manila Film Festival.

Feng Shui was digitally restored and remastered in 2020 and subsequently made available on Apple TV+. In 2022, it was added to Netflix for streaming in Southeast Asia beginning October 14.

== Plot ==
On a bus, Joy Ramirez finds a bagua mirror left behind by a passenger. Upon showing it to Biring at her bakery, the latter tells her to keep it and display it for good luck as per feng shui tradition.

Joy returns home and places the mirror at their front door. Afterwards, her friend Alice grants her a promotion, and she wins a prize at a supermarket. The next day, Joy finds out that the passenger who left the mirror, identified as Evart Mendoza, was hit by a Rabbit Liner bus and discovers that he was born in the year of the Rabbit. Later, Joy learns that Biring, who was born in the year of the Rat, died of leptospirosis. Then Billy, a friend of Joy's son Denton, mentions the stabbing of her regular tricycle driver, Nestor, at a cockfight brawl—he was born in the year of the Rooster. She is later haunted by the ghosts of Nestor, Biring, Evart, and a woman.

Joy visits Evart's widow, Lily, who tells her about the mirror's history; Lily found it in a house she sold as a real estate agent and kept it. It brought her luck, but for each instance, a death followed afterward, with her husband dying after attempting to dispose of the mirror. She urges Joy to return the mirror to her, but the latter refuses. Later, after Joy accepts an inheritance from a late client, her husband Inton and children find a lifeless security guard, who stared into the mirror earlier while inspecting Joy's house. He died from a snakebite—he was born in the year of the Snake.

Joy, Alice, and their psychic friend Thelma seek help from a local geomancer, Hsui Liao. He reveals that the mirror once belonged to a wealthy Chinese family in Shanghai during the Qing Dynasty and Republican era. During the Chinese Civil War, the family evacuated, leaving behind a family member, nicknamed "Lotus Feet", whose feet were bound and could therefore not flee. Her servants then joined the Chinese Communist Party and burned her at the stake. As she perished, she took the mirror and cursed it, taking the soul of anyone who sees their reflection in it.

Joy confronts Inton after meeting with his former lover Dina. After accepting her supermarket prize, she realizes that Alice, who had glanced at the mirror earlier in Joy's house after moving it to the back door, is the next victim. Alice, who was born in the year of the Horse, is defenestrated, falling atop crates of Red Horse Beer bottles. The ghosts of the dead haunt Joy's house and her family is forced to flee. Joy attempts to destroy the mirror, but is stopped by Alice's ghost, and she faints.

The next morning, Hsui Liao calls Joy, telling her that to end the curse, she must refuse offers of good luck and destroy the mirror. Just before they leave, Joy donates blood to Billy, who suffered an accident. Afterwards, she then realizes that Inton is the next victim. Joy rushes to tell him and Dina, but Dina's husband Louie, who has a dog tattoo, shoots his wife and Inton before turning the gun on himself—Dina and Inton were born in the year of the Dog. Meanwhile, as Thelma drives Denton and his sister Ingrid to their mother, she sees a truck of livestock in front of her car. Upon asking them, she realizes that Ingrid was born in the year of the Rooster, and Denton and herself were both born in the year of the Ox. Horrified, Thelma tries to evade the truck but ends up crashing.

Joy arrives home and is met by Lily's lawyer, who is tasked to recover the mirror in exchange for money, but the latter firmly refuses. Distraught by preceding events, Joy finally destroys the mirror. Thelma arrives with Denton and Ingrid. A relieved Joy then realizes that they all died in the road accident when she sees Inton's ghost reuniting with their children's as she screams in horror.

Sometime later, a couple moves into the neighborhood as their twin daughters wander into Joy's former house, finding the restored mirror and bringing it home, with Lotus Feet watching.

== Cast ==
=== Main cast ===
- Kris Aquino as Joy Ramirez
- Jay Manalo as Inton Ramirez

=== Supporting cast ===
- Lotlot de Leon as Alice
- Ilonah Jean as Thelma
- John Vladimir Manalo as Denton Ramirez
- Julianne Gomez as Ingrid Ramirez
- Ernesto Sto. Tomas as Billy
- Cherry Pie Picache as Lily Mendoza
- Nonie Buencamino as Louie
- Jenny Miller as Dina
- Gerard Pizzaras as Teodoro, Billy's uncle
- Joonee Gamboa as Hsui Liao
- Daria Ramirez as Inton's Mother
- Archie Adamos as Tito
- Emil Sandoval as Evart Mendoza
- Luz Fernandez as Aling Biring
- Leo Gamboa as Mang Nestor
- Mon Confiado as Raul
- Denise Joaquin as Office mate
- Jon Achaval as Mr. Mateo
- Hazel Espinosa as Billy's aunt
- Jenine Desiderio as Wife Neighbor
- Froilan Sales as Husband Neighbor
- Archie Ventosa as Atty. Regalado
- Aloysius Noroña as Atty. Ocampo
- Bianca Ito as Girl 1
- Blanca Ate as Girl 2
- Rosie Salco as Lotus Lady

== Themes ==
Film critic Ryan Oquiza highlighted the film's emphasis on the struggle for affluence, expounding on "how it unnerves the middle class from their life of luxury, showing cracks in the seams of gated communities and interrogating their faith in fate" while the recurring themes of Chinese astrology "mystifies the idea of affluence as an unachievable, lofty, and at times, sinister concept". He also interpreted the film's message to suggest that to become rich, one must surrender his/her morals and prepare to have others bear the brunt of the person's self-interest.

== Reception ==
The film was released at the time that 'Asian horror' gained popularity. It was a critical and commercial success, receiving positive reception from critics and audiences alike, and grossing ₱114,236,563 at the box-office making it the first local horror film to breach the 100 million pesos milestone at the box office. The film was the first in the line-up of box-office horror hits that Kris Aquino did under Star Cinema in which she was tagged as "Philippine's Box-Office Horror Queen". It was followed by Sukob (also directed by Roño), Dalaw, and Segunda Mano.

== Sequel and remake ==
A sequel was confirmed by Kris Aquino, and the cast includes Coco Martin, Carmi Martin, Ian Veneracion, Beauty Gonzalez, Rez Cortez, Ian de Leon, Martin Escudero, Elizabeth Chua, Diana Zubiri, Francine Prieto, Pinky Marquez, Raikko Mateo, Kych Cyl Minemoto, Randy See, and Teodoro Baldomaro. Roño returned to direct the film. It served as Star Cinema's official entry to the 2014 Metro Manila Film Festival. The film focused on Coco Martin's character, who, upon getting the cursed bagua, starts to get all the luck and prosperity he could get in his life, but with deadly consequences. Kris Aquino reprised her role as Joy Ramirez to save him from the curse, as did Cherry Pie Picache and Joonie Gamboa. Filming of the film commenced by late August 2014.

A remake of the film has been confirmed and will be produced by Star Creatives and will release on streaming via iWant titled Feng Shui: Curse Reborn.

== Parodies ==
- In the 2012 comedy film Sisterakas, the protagonist Bernice (played by Vice Ganda) hires Lotus Feet, who turns out to be a DVD vendor, to scare off her business rival Roselle (played by Kris Aquino), which leads to her falling down a stairwell and fracturing her foot. The film reused the scene where Lotus Feet was holding Alice's battered corpse in the original film.
- In the 2014 comedy film The Amazing Praybeyt Benjamin, the titular character (also played by Vice Ganda) uses a bagua mirror to distinguish Aquino's son Bimbee from a group of similar-looking children by seeing which of them will scream upon seeing the mirror. The Amazing Praybeyt Benjamin was also part of the 2014 Metro Manila Film Festival which included the film's sequel.

== See also ==
- List of ghost films
