= Espiridiona Bonifacio =

Espiridonia Bonifacio
- Born: May 1, 1872; Tondo, Manila, Captaincy General of the Philippines
- Died: May 26, 1956 (aged 84); Paco, Manila, Philippines
- Resting place: Manila South Cemetery
- Other name: Doña Nonay
- Known for: Philippine Revolution
- Political party: Katipunan
- Spouse: Teodoro Plata (m. 1893; died 1897)

Espiridiona Bonifacio y de Castro (May 1, 1872 – May 26, 1956) was a Filipino Katipunera. She was one of the first female members of Confederation established by her older brother Andres Bonifacio. The others were her older brothers Ciriaco and Procopio Bonifacio.

== Life ==
Bonifacio was born in Tondo, Manila. Her father was Santiago Bonifacio of Taguig, a tailor who served as a teniente mayor of Tondo, Manila. Her mother was Catalina de Castro, a native of Cabangan, Zambales, a mestiza born of a Spanish father and a Filipino-Chinese mother who was a supervisor at a cigarette factory. She was the fourth of six children. Her siblings were Andrés, Ciriaco, Procopio, Troadio and Maxima. The Bonifacio siblings were orphaned at an early age and Andrés had to act as the family's breadwinner. Bonifacio, better known by her nickname, Nonay, was dependent on her brothers for guidance. Her three older brothers were all part of the armed struggle.

She joined the revolution as a teenager, going with either the group or hers brothers wherever they went. Her older brothers were her de facto parents. She hid bullets in the pots she cooked rice in and hid guns under her skirt. She took care of the wounded and sick Katipuneros and cooked for them.

The women's chapter of the Katipunan was formed in July 1893. There were only around 30 women members of the Katipunan, limited to wives, daughters and close relatives of Katipuneros.

In 1893, when she was seventeen years old, she married Teodoro Plata, one of the founders of the Katipunan. She was widowed when Plata was executed in Bagumbayan in 1897 when the Spaniards discovered the Katipunan.

She died on May 26, 1956, in Paco, Manila, and was interred at the Manila South Cemetery.

== In popular culture ==
- Portrayed by Isabel Oli in the 2014 film, Bonifacio: Ang Unang Pangulo.

== See also ==
- Melchora Aquino
- Hilaria Aguinaldo
- Trinidad Tecson
- Gregoria de Jesús
- Agueda Kahabagan
- Agueda Esteban
- Nazaria Lagos
- Teresa Magbanua
- Marina Dizon
- Patrocinio Gamboa
