= Supremo (film) =

- Film poster
- Directed by: Richard V. Somes
- Written by: Jimmy Flores
- Produced by: PM Vargas
- Starring: Alfred Vargas; Mon Confiado; Hermie Concepcion; Nicco Manalo; Alex Vincent Medina; Nica Naval; Manu Respall
- Cinematography: Alex Espartero
- Edited by: Carlo Francisco Manatad; Joris Fernandez
- Music by: Von de Guzman
- Production companies: Alternative Vision Cinema; Strawdogs Studio Production
- Release dates: November 30, 2012 (SM City Fairview); December 5, 2012
- Country: Philippines
- Language: Tagalog

Supremo is a 2012 Filipino biographical film directed by Richard V. Somes about the life of Katipunan Supremo (President) Andrés Bonifacio. The film stars Alfred Vargas as Bonifacio, alongside Mon Confiado, Hermie Concepcion, Nicco Manalo, Alex Vincent Medina, Nica Naval, and Manu Respall. The film premiered at SM City Fairview in Quezon City on November 30, 2012, Bonifacio's 149th birth anniversary, and went into general release on December 5. It was also entered into competition at the 14th Cinemanila International Film Festival.

== Cast ==
- Alfred Vargas as Andrés Bonifacio
- Mon Confiado as Macario Sakay
- Hermie Concepcion as Melchora "Tandang Sora" Aquino
- Nicco Manalo as Emilio Jacinto
- Alex Vincent Medina as Procopio Bonifacio
- Nica Naval as Gregoria de Jesús
- Manu Respall as Emilio Aguinaldo
- Shielbert Manuel as Pio Valenzuela
- Lehner Mendoza as Scarfaced
- Jeff Fernandez as Genaro de los Reyes
- Banjo Romero as Gaspar
- Alex Cabodil as Magbanua

== See also ==
- Bonifacio: Ang Unang Pangulo (2014)
