= Private Benjamin =

Private Benjamin may refer to:

- Private Benjamin (1980 film), a 1980 American film starring Goldie Hawn
  - Private Benjamin (TV series), a TV series based on the 1980 film
- The Unkabogable Praybeyt Benjamin, a 2011 Philippine film
  - The Amazing Praybeyt Benjamin, 2014 sequel film to the 2011 Philippine film
