= Manila South Cemetery =

Public cemetery in Manila, Philippines

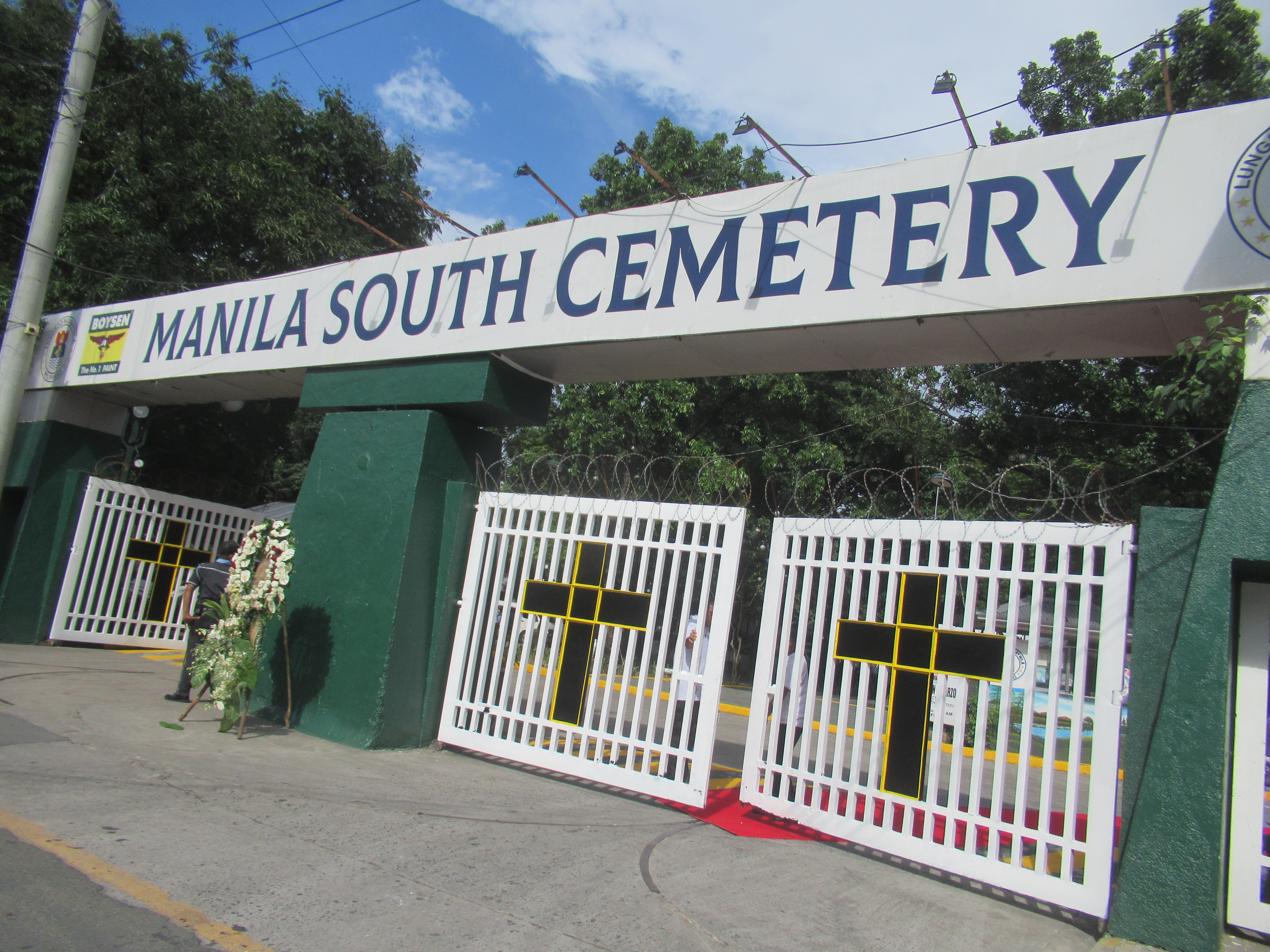
- Main entrance to the Manila South Cemetery
- Interactive map of Manila South Cemetery

Details
- Established: 1920s
- Location: Manila, Metro Manila
- Country: Philippines
- Coordinates: 14°33′56″N 121°1′9″E
- Type: Public
- Owned by: Manila City Government
- Size: 25 hectares (62 acres)
- No. of graves: 750,000+
- Website: www.manilasouthcemetery.com

The Manila South Cemetery is a cemetery in Metro Manila. It is an exclave of San Andres, Manila surrounded by land under the jurisdiction of the Barangay Santa Cruz, Makati.

== History ==
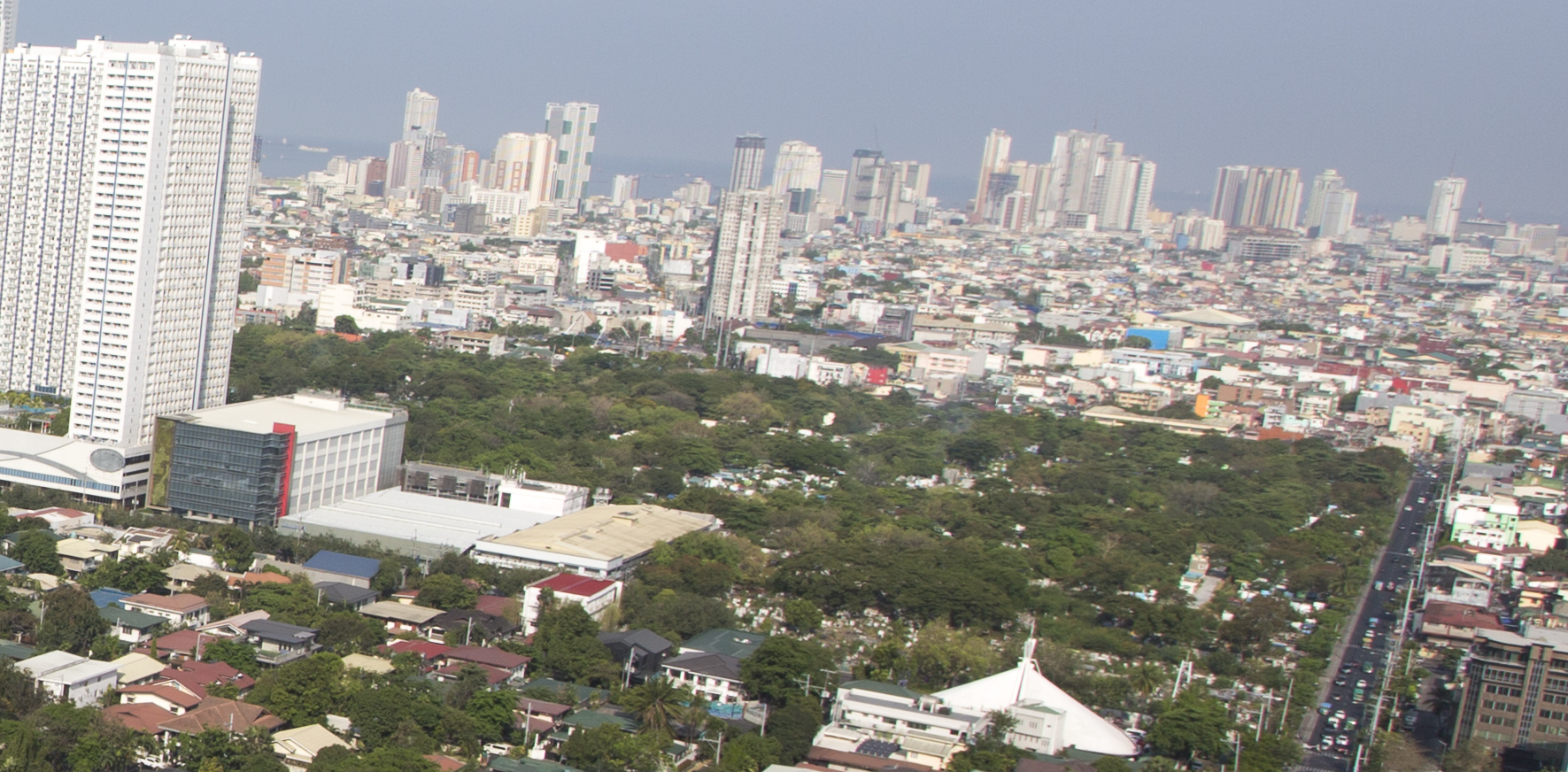
Bird's eye view of the cemetery

The land which the cemetery occupies was previously part of the Hacienda San Pedro de Macati which was owned by the Zóbel de Ayala family. The land was then under the province of Rizal. The South Cemetery was legally acquired by Ordinance 726 and other actions taken as ruled in Jacobo Zobel et al. vs. City of Manila (G.R. No. L-22201, 1925). The cemetery, occupying an area of 25 hectares (62 acres), has a maximum capacity of 371,490 graves. As of June 30, 2007, 266,170 burials were made in the cemetery. There were an estimated 753,186 burials as of July 2018.

On All Saints' Day 2015, a record 32,000 people visited the cemetery.

The Manila City Government under Mayor Isko Moreno in 2020 passed Ordinance No. 8608 allotting 2,400 square meters (26,000 sq ft) within the Manila South Cemetery for the establishment of the Manila Muslim Cemetery. The groundbreaking ceremony for the Muslim cemetery was held on July 22, 2020. The cemetery was inaugurated as the Manila Islamic Cemetery on June 7, 2021.

== Notable burials ==
- Freddie Aguilar (1953–2025), singer (buried in Manila Islamic Cemetery)
- Ramon Bagatsing (1916–2006), longest serving Mayor of Manila, survivor of the Plaza Miranda bombing
- León Guinto (1886–1962), Mayor of Manila during World War II, Governor of Quezon
- Elpidio Quirino (1890–1956), former president of the Philippines (reinterred at the Libingan ng mga Bayani in 2016)
- Espiridiona Bonifacio (1875–1956), nationalist, revolutionary, and sister of Andrés Bonifacio
- Lucrecia Roces Kasilag (1918–2008), composer, music educator, and National Artist for Music
- Lope K. Santos (1879–1963), novelist, linguist, and grammarian of the Filipino language
- Paraluman (1923–2009), actress of the 1950s (reinterred at the St. Therese Columbary)
- Joey Hizon (1958–2016), councilor and representative for Manila's 5th district
- Danny Lacuna (1938–2023), former Vice Mayor of Manila and founder of Asenso Manileño

== See also ==
- La Loma Cemetery
- Manila Chinese Cemetery
- Libingan ng mga Bayani
- Manila North Cemetery
- Scouting memorials
