= Muslim Magnum .357: To Serve and Protect =

- Film poster
- Directed by: Francis 'Jun' Posadas
- Screenplay by: Catherine O. Camarillo
- Story by: Catherine O. Camarillo; E.R. Ejercito
- Based on: Muslim .357 (1986) by Ronwaldo Reyes
- Starring: Jeorge "E.R." Estregan; Sam Pinto
- Cinematography: Francis Ricardo Buhay III
- Edited by: Jason Cahapay
- Music by: Jessie Lasaten
- Production company: Scenema Concept International
- Distributed by: Viva Films
- Release date: December 25, 2014
- Country: Philippines
- Language: Filipino

Muslim Magnum .357: To Serve and Protect, also known as simply Muslim Magnum .357, is a 2014 Filipino action film directed by Francis 'Jun' Posadas and starring Jeorge "E.R." Estregan and Sam Pinto. It is a remake of the 1986 film Muslim .357 directed by and starring Fernando Poe Jr., to whom the film is dedicated.

Produced by Scenema Concept International, the film was released by Viva Films on December 25, 2014, as an entry to the 40th Metro Manila Film Festival.

== Plot ==
Muslim princess Ameerah is kidnapped by an infamous crime group. Lt. Jamal Razul, a veteran police agent, aims to uncover who kidnapped the princess before Ameerah's family declares war with a rival clan they assume to be the culprits.

== Cast ==
- Jeorge "E.R." Estregan as Lt. Jamal Razul
- Sam Pinto as Ameerah Naureen
- Roi Vinzon as Bng. Gen. Gideon de Tagle
- John Arcilla as Col. Jose Ramos
- John Regala as Rasheed Abdul-Salam
- Efren Reyes as Faruq Ghazi
- Jon Hall
- Clarence Delgado as Niko
- Jerico Estregan as Sgt. Joselito Ibanez
- Maita Ejercito as Mandy
- Brenda Archangel as Hajah Brenda Abdul-Salam
- Gwen Zamora as Yasmeen
- Baron Geisler as Yusuf
- Gerald Ejercito as Michael
- Bernard Palanca as Clavio Esteban

== Release ==
Muslim Magnum .357 was released on December 25, 2014, as part of the 40th Metro Manila Film Festival (MMFF).

== Reception ==
=== Accolades ===
Year	Group	Category	Name	Result
2014	Metro Manila Film Festival	Best Screenplay	Cathy Camarillo	Nominated
2014	Metro Manila Film Festival	Best Supporting Actor	Roi Vinzon	Nominated
2014	Metro Manila Film Festival	Best Child Performer	Clarence Delgado	Nominated
2014	Metro Manila Film Festival	Best Original Theme Song	"Kapayapaan" by Datu Khomeini Bansuan	Nominated
2014	Metro Manila Film Festival	Gatpuno Antonio J. Villegas Cultural Award	Muslim Magnum .357	Nominated
2015	FAMAS Awards	Best Picture	Muslim Magnum .357	Nominated
2015	FAMAS Awards	Best Director	Francis Posadas	Nominated
2015	FAMAS Awards	Best Actor	Jeorge Estregan	Nominated
2015	FAMAS Awards	Best Actress	Sam Pinto	Nominated
2015	FAMAS Awards	Best Supporting Actor	Roi Vinzon	Nominated
2015	FAMAS Awards	Best Child Performer	Clarence Delgado	Nominated
2015	FAMAS Awards	Best Screenplay	Cathy Camarillo	Nominated
2015	FAMAS Awards	Best Cinematography	Ricardo Buhay	Nominated
2015	FAMAS Awards	Best Story	Cathy Camarillo	Nominated
2015	FAMAS Awards	Best Visual Effects	Erick Torrente	Won
2015	FAMAS Awards	Best Theme Song	"Kapayapaan" by Datu Khomeini Bansuan	Nominated

=== Box office ===
Among the eight entries to the MMFF, Muslim Magnum .357 is in the bottom four films in terms of box office gross.
