= Guillermo de Vega =

Filipino assistant of Ferdinand Marcos (1931–1975)

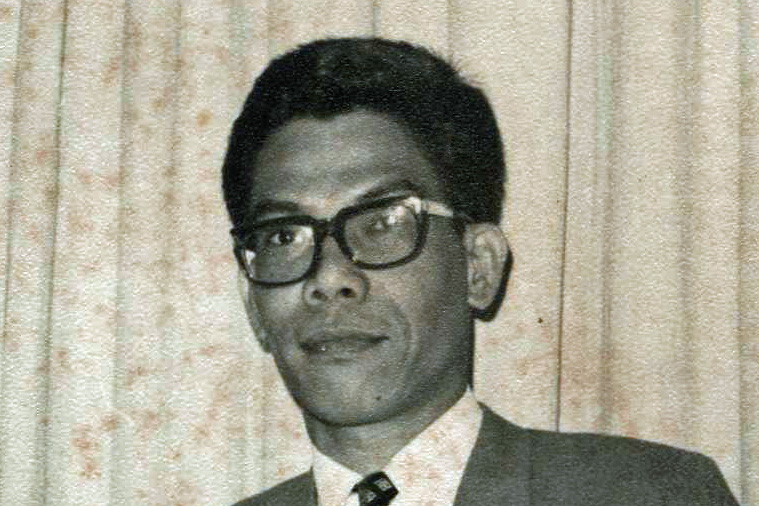
- De Vega in 1969

Chairmen of the Board of Censors for Motion Pictures
- In office 1969–1975
- Preceded by: Office established
- Succeeded by: Ma. Rocio Atienza de Vega

Personal details
- Born: Guillermo Vinluan de Vega; February 1, 1931 Manila, Insular Government of the Philippine Islands
- Died: October 27, 1975 (aged 44) Manila, Philippines
- Spouse: Ma. Rocio Atienza
- Children: 3

Guillermo Vinluan de Vega (February 1, 1931 – October 27, 1975), nicknamed Gimo, was a presidential assistant of Philippine president Ferdinand E. Marcos with the rank of cabinet secretary. As chair of the Board of Censors for Motion Pictures from the late 1960s to 1975, de Vega served as Marcos' chief censor, instituting censorship policies as a means of social change. He was assassinated on October 27, 1975 while working at his office at the Malacañang Palace, the site of the president's residence and office complex.

== Overview ==
As presidential assistant, Secretary de Vega was in charge of preparing documents for the president's appointment of officials of the executive and judicial departments, among other duties. He was thus regarded as the "little president".

He was also the chairman of the Board of Censors for Motion Pictures (now known as the Movie and Television Review and Classification Board), a chess buff and a published writer. He first served Malacañang in 1967 under then Executive Secretary Rafael M. Salas, who recommended him as a Special Assistant in the Office of the President.

Guillermo is survived by his wife Maria Rocio Atienza de Vega and their three children, Maria Margarita, born 1960, Eduardo Jose (Ambassador of the Philippines), born 1964, and Jaime Rafael, born 1967. They were married on February 21, 1959, and his widow has not remarried. His remains are in the St. James Parish at Muntinlupa, Philippines.

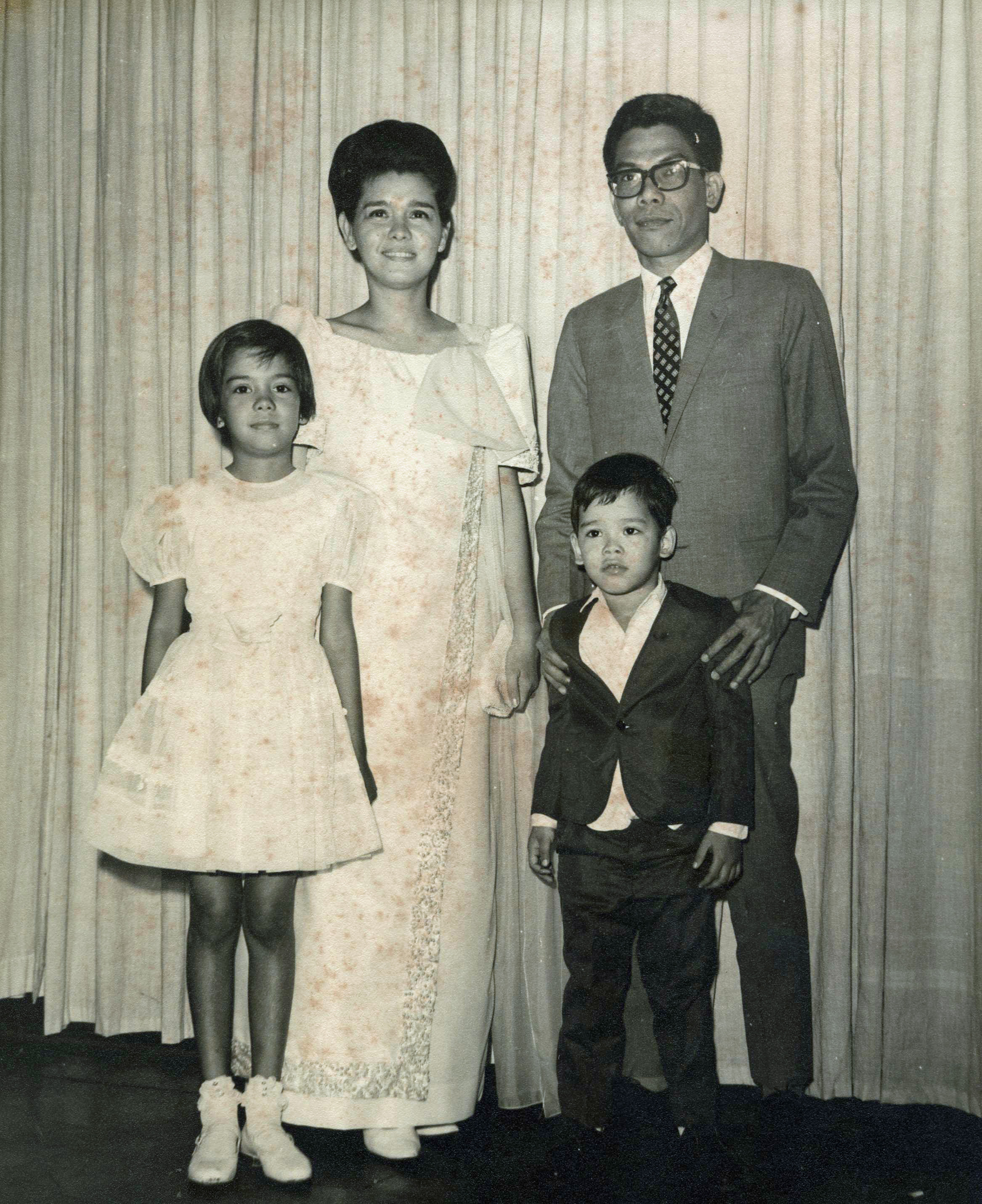
Guillermo de Vega with his family, 1969

Among De Vega's published works were Ferdinand Marcos: An Epic (1974), a biography in verse that was also translated into Filipino, and Film and Freedom: Movie Censorship in the Philippines (1975), the first comprehensive historical account of film censorship in the Philippines.

== Early life ==
De Vega was born in Manila, Philippines on February 1, 1931, to Jose Cruz de Vega and Vicenta Vinluan. He graduated from the Manuel L. Quezon University with a Master of Arts degree in History and a Bachelor of Arts degree in History, cum laude. He obtained his Doctor of Philosophy in History from the University of Sindh in Hyderabad, Pakistan in 1962 as an exchange scholar of the Southeast Asia Treaty Organization (SEATO).

== Achievements ==
The archives of De Vega are housed at the Technological Institute of the Philippines, which granted university scholarships annually in his name from 1976 to 2011.

The Movie Workers Welfare Foundation or Mowelfund established the Dr. Guillermo de Vega Memorial Library in 2006. Mowelfund was the beneficiary of the popular annual Metro Manila Film Festival first held in 1975 when it was founded by De Vega together with former President Joseph Ejercito Estrada, who was then the President of the Philippine Motion Pictures Association, Mayor of San Juan town, and a film actor.

== Death ==
De Vega's death was considered mysterious since it occurred during the years when the Philippines was under martial law. Security within the Malacañang grounds should have been tight. Yet the convicted gunman Paulino Arceo had apparently smuggled in an unlicensed Smith & Wesson revolver in a manila envelope.

During Arceo's meeting with De Vega at his office in the administration building, gunshots were heard by witnesses including Judge (then Prosecutor) Hilario Lacqui, and then Arceo rushed out. Arceo was immediately stopped and arrested when staff found de Vega unconscious and bleeding on the floor. De Vega was pronounced dead on arrival at the hospital due to his five bullet wounds.

The killing was ruled as murder on June 30, 1976, following trial by a military commission. Arceo was imprisoned and given the death penalty. After former president Marcos was ousted from power and replaced by former president Corazon C. Aquino in 1986, the Supreme Court invalidated all decisions rendered by military tribunals against civilians, and the criminal case was retried by the civil courts. The murder case against Arceo was filed before the Regional Trial Court of Manila, which ruled in 1990 that Arceo was guilty of the lesser crime of homicide. He was ordered released from jail since he had served more than the minimum sentence set by Philippine law for the crime of homicide.

When interviewed for a television show in 2002, Arceo claimed he was a victim of the Marcos administration and denied having been paid for his crime. He also repeated his defense that he suddenly lost consciousness but was certain that De Vega was alive when he left the office. Arceo has since died.

== See also ==
- Corazon Aquino
- Joseph Ejercito Estrada
- Ferdinand E. Marcos
