= The Amazing Praybeyt Benjamin =

2014 film by Wenn V. Deramas

- Theatrical release poster
- Directed by: Wenn V. Deramas
- Screenplay by: Keiko A. Aquino; Wenn V. Deramas; Danno Kristoper C. Mariquit
- Story by: Kriz Gazmen; Keiko A. Aquino; Wenn V. Deramas; Danno Kristoper C. Mariquit
- Based on: Private Benjamin by Howard Zieff
- Produced by: Vincent Del Rosario III; Veronique Del Rosario-Corpus
- Starring: Vice Ganda; Richard Yap; Tom Rodriguez; Alex Gonzaga; Bimby Aquino-Yap
- Cinematography: Elmer Despa
- Edited by: Marya Ignacio
- Music by: Vincent de Jesus
- Production companies: ABS-CBN Film Productions, Inc.; Viva Films
- Distributed by: Star Cinema
- Release date: December 25, 2014
- Running time: 105 minutes
- Country: Philippines
- Languages: Filipino; English
- Box office: ₱455 million (US$9 million)

The Amazing Praybeyt Benjamin is a 2014 Philippine action comedy parody film written and directed by Wenn V. Deramas. It is the sequel to the 2011 film The Unkabogable Praybeyt Benjamin. The film is one of the official entries to the 40th Metro Manila Film Festival. Vice Ganda reprised his role as Colonel Benjamin "Benjie" Santos VIII together with a supporting cast Richard Yap, Tom Rodriguez, Bimby Yap and introducing Alex Gonzaga with the special participation of Eddie Garcia.

== Plot ==
In a mission in Paris, Praybeyt Benjamin and his platoon defeat a horde of zombies, parodying Plants vs. Zombies, leading to his promotion to Colonel. Benjamin is assigned to a new general, Wilson Chua, to prepare him better. However, Benjamin messes up a subsequent mission against terrorists led by Jan Jaranjan and is rescued by his grandfather, who sacrifices himself to save him. Benjamin is about to be dismissed from service when Gen. Chua saves him by giving him a mission – to guard his bratty son Bimbee, who holds a clue to the location of the terrorists' next three bomb attacks.

As he watches over Bimbee, Benjamin clashes with Misty, General Chua's daughter, and the meddlesome housemaid Gundina while trying to gain information from a recalcitrant Bimby. However, as he gets to know Bimbee more, he learns that Bimbee is a kid deprived of familial love – something he has ignored in his quest to be on top again. The first bomb explodes harmlessly while the second is found and defused by Benjamin, who is fired after his arrogance causes an error. While relearning his humility with his family, the terrorists abduct Bimby and take him to their last target, a shopping mall. Benjamin is reinstated into the army, rescues Bimby, and defuses the bomb, after which he flies off with Bimby on an umbrella resembling Mary Poppins.

Upon mid-credits, Benjie celebrated his birthday with his family and friends. Wilson heard about Benjie not going back to the service. Benjie says he wants to take a break and spend more time with his family. However, Wilson says they need him and assigns a juvenile delinquent who wishes to be a soldier. There, Wilson introduced James Anred to Benjie. Because of James's good looks, Benjie accepts Wilson's offer.

== Cast of characters ==
=== Main cast ===
- Vice Ganda as Col. Benjamin "Benjie" Santos VIII
- Richard Yap as Commanding General Officer Wilson Chua
- Tom Rodriguez as Jan Jaranjan
- Bimby Aquino Yap as Bimbee Pineda Chua
- Alex Gonzaga as Gundina Galamiton

=== Supporting cast ===
- Al Tantay as Benjamin "Ben" Santos VII
- Eddie Garcia† as Gen. Benjamin "Bino" Santos VI
- Vandolph Quizon as Buhawi Manay
- Nikki Valdez as Lucresia Alcantara
- Kean Cipriano as Emerson Ecleo
- Anja Aguilar as Jesamine Santos
- Jojit Lorenzo as Jolo Makapagtagpo Jr.
- DJ Durano as Dominador "Dondi" Rosales
- Ricky Rivero† as Big Boy Carnate
- Dennis Padilla as Bentot Santos
- Malou de Guzman as Lilibeth Santos
- Abby Bautista as Anjemin Santos
- Tess Antonio as Lisa Santos
- Rhed Bustamante as Misty Chua
- Gerard Garcia as Inspector Daemon Bautista
- Kurt Ong as Inspector Realado
- Boom Labrusca as Boomburoomboom
- David Licauco as Terrorist
- Rubi Rubi as Captain Tenille
- Atak Araña as Zak Apron

=== Cameo ===
- Kris Aquino as Krissy
- Darla Sauler as Darla
- Luis Manzano as young Benjamin "Ben" Santos VII
- Angel Locsin as young Lilibeth Santos
- James Reid as James Anred
- Hideo Muraoka as French Soldier

== Reception ==
=== Box office ===
MMDA Chairman Francis Tolentino, revealed that The Amazing Praybeyt Benjamin topped the box office record of the 40th Metro Manila Film Festival's opening day on December 25, 2014, in a radio interview in DZMM. Praybeyt Benjamin was ahead of fellow entrants, My Big Bossing's Adventures and Feng Shui 2 ranked second and third respectively in terms of box office record on the opening day of the film festival. Tolentino did not state the official figures of the sales on the opening day of the film festival during the said interview.

During her stint at The Buzz where is she is one of the hosts, Kris Aquino said that The Amazing Praybeyt Benjamin recorded P172 million worth of box office receipts as of 3:00 pm PST December 28, 2014.

=== Critical response ===
Despite being a high-grossing film at the 40th Metro Manila Film Festival, reception for The Amazing Praybeyt Benjamin generally received negative reviews.

Zig Marasigan of Rappler, described the film in his movie review as "a brainless, hyper-stylized and utterly ridiculous family comedy". Marasigan criticized Praybeyt Benjamin for "unashamedly made for profit". He also described the film as "cheap, tacky and absolutely nonsensical. But say what you might about the film's level of intellectualism (or lack thereof), it is at least honest about its intentions". Marasigan however acknowledged that the film fulfilled its purpose, to primarily entertain its target audience.

Bubbles Salvador at the Philippine Entertainment Portal, has a more positive review for the film. While Salvador took note of one loophole in the plot of the film - namely the lack of resolution between Bimbee and his father, with the former feeling unloved by the latter, Salvador described Praybeyt Benjamin 2 as "worth of one's couple of hours at the cinema this holiday season, if one is not looking for a lesson in history, a love story, or a good scare, and would settle for a light and funny action comedy".

== Planned sequel ==
After the Leap Day 2016 passing of Deramas, a third film was announced as an entry to the 46th Metro Manila Film Festival. Vice Ganda was expected to reprise his role. Filming for the Praybeyt Benjamin sequel was delayed due to logistics issues caused by the COVID-19 pandemic and uncertainties caused by the non-renewal of ABS-CBN's broadcast franchise. As a script-based submission to the film festival, Praybeyt Benjamin would have to be produced by November 30, 2020.
