= Alonzo Muhlach =

Filipino actor (born 2010)

- Born: Alonzo Andretti Tupaz Muhlach; February 19, 2010 (age 16); Philippines
- Other name: Lonzo
- Occupations: Child actor, model
- Years active: 2014–present
- Agents: Viva Artists Agency; (2015–present)
- Known for: Prinsipe Vladimir (My Big Bossing)

Alonzo Andretti Tupaz Muhlach (born February 19, 2010) is a Filipino actor best known for his role as Prinsipe Vladimir in the "Prinsesa" segment of the anthology film My Big Bossing. In January 2017, he joined the first season of Your Face Sounds Familiar Kids on ABS-CBN.

== Early life ==
Muchlach was born on February 19, 2010, in Manila, Philippines. He is the son of the former child actor Niño Muhlach. His brother, Alessandro Martinno Millare Muhlach (born in 2003) is the son of Edith Millare, his father's first wife. Aga Muhlach and AJ Muhlach are his father's first cousins. His great-aunt is postwar movie star Amalia Fuentes and his great-grandmother is famed prewar actress Nela Álvarez.

== Career ==
He started in McDonald's commercial along with his father.

In 2014, Muhlach is best known for his first film, My Big Bossing as Prinsipe Vladimir.

In 2015, Muhlach made his second film, Wang Fam as Vey Wang.

In later 2015, Muhlach created his third film, Beauty and the Bestie he played Jumbo Villaviencio and the movie was an ultimate success.

Later 2016, Muhlach made his fourth film, Enteng Kabisote 10 and the Abangers he played Benokis, grandson of Enteng.

In 2023, Muhlach played child Austin in Rewind.

== Filmography ==
=== Television ===
Year	Title	Role(s)	Type of Role
2014	Eat Bulaga!	Himself	Cast member
2015	Goin' Bulilit	Himself	Cast member
2015	Pablo S. Gomez's Inday Bote	Entoy	Main role
2015	Wansapanataym: Yamishita's Treasure	Newton	Main role
2016	Carlo J. Caparas' Ang Panday	Alfonso	Supporting role
2016	Happy Truck HAPPinas	Himself	Co-host
2017	Your Face Sounds Familiar Kids (season 1)	Himself / Various Artists	Contestant / Celebrity Performer
2017	D' Originals	Thor	Supporting Role
2017	ASAP	Himself	Co-host / Performer

=== Film ===
Year	Title	Role(s)	Type of Role
2014	The Trial	Julian "Junjun" Regala Bien Jr.	Supporting role
2014	My Big Bossing	Prinsipe Vladimir	Main role
2014	Kubot: The Aswang Chronicles 2	Batang Aswang / Makoy's son	Supporting role
2015	Wang Fam	Vey Wang	Main Role
2015	Beauty and the Bestie	Jumbo Villavicencio	Supporting role
2016	Enteng Kabisote 10 and the Abangers	Benokis Kabisote	Supporting role
2023	Rewind	Child Austin	Guest appearances

== Awards ==
Year	Award	Category	Work	Result
2015	2nd PEP List Awards	Pepster's Choice: Child Star of the Year	My Big Bossing	Nominated
2015	63rd FAMAS Awards	Best Child Performer	My Big Bossing	Nominated
2015	29th PMPC Star Awards for Television	Best Child Performer	Pablo S. Gomez's Inday Bote	Nominated
2015	29th PMPC Star Awards for Television	Best New Male TV Personality	Pablo S. Gomez's Inday Bote	Won
2015	41st Metro Manila Film Festival	Best Child Performer	Beauty and the Bestie	Nominated
2016	32nd PMPC Star Awards for Movies	Movie Child Performer of the Year	Beauty and the Bestie	Nominated
2016	3rd PEP List Awards	Pepster's Choice: Child Star of the Year	Pablo S. Gomez's Inday Bote	Nominated
2016	2nd Alta Media Icon Awards	Best Child Performer for Film	Beauty and the Bestie	Won
2016	30th PMPC Star Awards for Television	Best Child Performer	Carlo J. Caparas' Ang Panday	Nominated
