= Procopio Bonifacio =

Philippine independence activist and revolutionary

Procopio Castro Bonifacio
- Born: c. 1873; Tondo, Manila, Captaincy General of the Philippines, Spanish Empire
- Died: May 10, 1897 (aged 23–24); Maragondon, Cavite, Captaincy General of the Philippines, Spanish Empire
- Cause of death: Execution by firing squad
- Other names: Pío, Pisaw
- Known for: Philippine Revolution
- Political party: Katipunan

Procopio Castro Bonifacio (c. 1873 – May 10, 1897) was a Filipino independence activist and revolutionary during the Philippine Revolution of 1896 against Spain. He was a member of the secret revolutionary society turned revolutionary government Katipunan with his other siblings Ciriaco and Espiridiona. His eldest brother Andres C. Bonifacio was one of the founders and, eventually, president of the Katipunan.

== Family background and early life ==
Procopio was the third of the six children of Santiago Bonifacio and Catalina Castro-Bonifacio. His siblings were Andres, Ciriaco, Troadio, Espiridiona and Maxima.

During childhood he, with his other siblings, sold paper canes and fans made by their brother Andres for their living. Eventually, he was employed as a baggage porter in the government-owned Philippine National Railways until the revolution broke out.

== Family ==
Procopio had an affair with Juana from Mindoro. whom he met while organizing the Katipunan chapter in the island. They then had a son, Juan.

== Katipunan ==
Procopio became a member of Katipunan adopting the name Pisaw. He was responsible for the founding of Katipunan chapter in the island of Mindoro.

With Andres Bonifacio, Candido Tirona, Emilio Jacinto and Pio Valenzuela they founded the Council of the Ancient Assignment in Kawit, Cavite. Procopio was led into light, which is a part of such council.

He was present during the Cry of Balintawak in August 1896 in Caloocan which signaled the start of the Philippine Revolution.

== Revolution ==
Procopio fought the Spanish authorities side-by-side with his brothers Andres and Ciriaco. He was given the rank of colonel.

In December 1896, he and Ciriaco accompanied their brother Andres and wife Gregoria to Cavite through the invitation of Cavite's provincial head of the revolution Mariano Alvarez to mediate between the growing conflict of the two rival factions of the Katipunan in the province, that of Magdiwang headed by Alvarez and Magdalo headed by cousins Emilio and Baldomero Aguinaldo. The mediation turned out to be a lost cause for the Bonifacios. Andres Bonifacio who was recognized as the over-all leader of the revolution and of the Katipunan, was insulted and disrespected by a Magdalo officer. The revolutionary leadership of Andres Bonifacio then shifted to Emilio Aguinaldo who was elected as president through the Tejeros Convention.

== Death ==
Due to the insults experienced by them from the Cavite revolutionary leaders, he and other leaders of the Katipunan signed the Acta de Tejeros, proclaiming that the Tejeros Convention had been disorderly, that its decisions were illegitimate and invalid. They opted to leave the province and go back to Manila or Morong. While they were leaving Cavite, they were the target of a surprise attack (ARREST ORDER due to Treason as initially evidenced by the ACTA de Tejeros itself) by Emilio Aguinaldo's men led by Gen. Agapito Bonzon and Gen. José Ignacio Paua due to some events while they were encamped in a village in Indang. Ciriaco was shot dead, while Procopio was beaten and Andres was shot in the arm and stabbed in the neck by Paua.

The two remaining brothers were then brought to Naic for a trial, then to Maragondon, and were subjected to a court-martial as ordered by the war council under the new revolutionary government. They were sentenced to death. The two brothers were taken into the mountains. Procopio, 24 years old, was shot dead before Andres suffered the same fate.

== In popular culture ==
- Portrayed by Joko Diaz in the film, El Presidente (2012).
- Portrayed by Alchris Galura in the TV series, Katipunan (2013).
- Portrayed by Junjun Quintana in the film, Bonifacio: Ang Unang Pangulo (2014).
- Portrayed by Jake Feraren in the film, Heneral Luna (2015).

== See also ==
- Gregoria A. de Jesus
- Apolinario Mabini
