= Nazaria Lagos =

Filipino nationalist and revolutionary

- Born: August 28, 1851; Jaguimit, Dueñas, Iloilo, Captaincy General of the Philippines
- Died: January 27, 1945 (aged 93); Dueñas, Iloilo, Commonwealth of the Philippines
- Known for: Philippine Revolution; Florence Nightingale of Panay
- Spouse: Segundo Lagos
- Children: Caridad Lagos; Felicita Lagos; Ramon Lagos; Pomposa Lagos; Filomena Lagos; Discoro Lagos; Jose Lagos

Nazaria Lagos (August 28, 1851 – January 27, 1945) was a nurse in the Revolution in the Philippine–American War. She was known as the Florence Nightingale of Panay, as she provided medical treatment to combatants and civilians.

== Early life ==
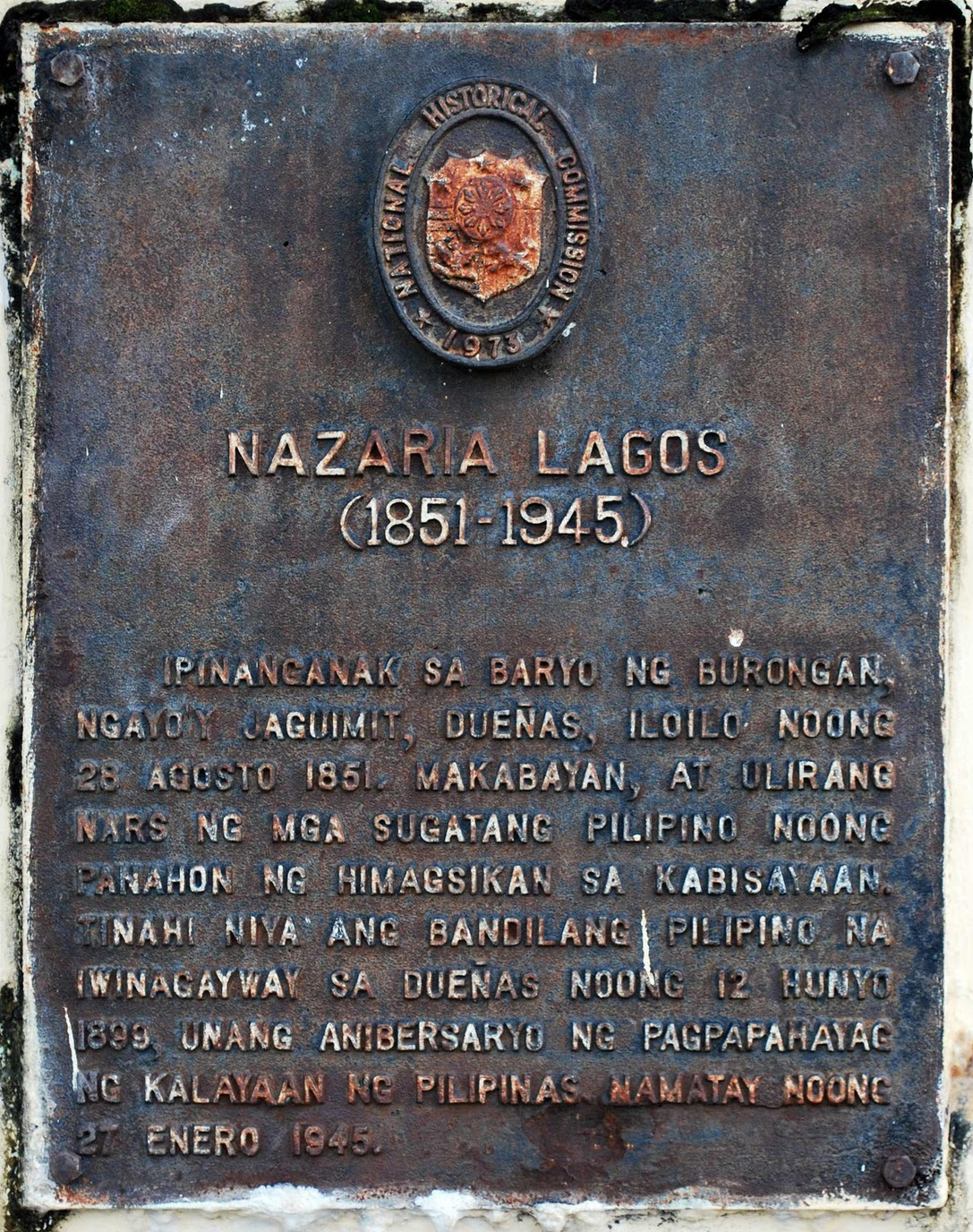
National historical marker installed in 1973 in Dueñas, Iloilo

Nazaria was born on August 28, 1851, in Barrio Burongan (now Jaguimit) Dueñas, Iloilo. She was the only child of Juan de la Cruz Lagos and Saturnina Labrilloso. She studied under Gregorio Tingson, who taught her the ofrecemiento, tocsin, cent, planar, and grammatical castellan.

=== Marriage ===
At 12 years old, Nazaria married Segundo Lagos, son of Bartolome Lagos, founder of the town of Dueñas. Her husband was serving as chief sacristan at the town church when he was appointed municipal president by Gen. Martin Delgado on October 27, 1898. When the military governor ordered Fr. Lorenzo Suarez to organize the first Red Cross in Iloilo in 1897, she was appointed as Red Cross president of Dueñas, with the priest giving her blanket authority to name its other officers.

=== Life in the barrio ===
Despite their connections with both church and government, Nazaria and her husband supported the revolutionary movement by working with, and giving resources to, the Visayan rebels. Their house in barrio Burongan was allegedly used for the meetings of the revolutionary leaders. In one of those meetings, Nazaria was appointed chief and director of the proposed rebel hospital in Jaguimit including the food supply and equipment depot established in the secluded Lagos hacienda, adjoining Jaguimit. She reportedly asked her father to help build the hospital, as well as provide bamboo beds, chairs, tables, shelves, and cabinets, and in soliciting clothing materials and beddings from her town mates. She also collected medicinal plants, such as alibhon, adgaw, buyo, luy-a, beta, amargoso, and guava, since there were no readily available medicines and drugs at the time, and mobilized traditional healers.

== As active Red Cross member during the war ==
During the Philippine–American War, the Red Cross hospital rendered service to wounded Filipino soldiers who had fought in the battle at the Tacas-Tucud-Sambog-Balantang line in February 1899. When the need for supplies and manpower increased, Nazaria tapped the Red Cross women, who helped her in nursing the sick and the wounded and in soliciting contributions of food and other supplies. As the news about the hospital spread, a number of civilians also went there for treatment.

=== Family tragedy and widowhood ===
During this time, Nazaria lost two of their children to smallpox. When the American troops occupied Iloilo, they burned the home of Lagos and the hospital buildings. Nazaria's family fled and were separated, but later reunited after the war.

=== Philippine flag hoisted in Iloilo ===
On June 12, 1899, when Panay observed the first anniversary of the proclamation of Philippine independence, Nazaria showed up with a beautifully embroidered Philippine flag which was raised with solemnity at the Dueñas town plaza. It was made by Nazaria herself, with the help of Gorgonia Somera, Lorenza Calatan and Pomposa and Caridad, her daughters.

== Death ==
Nazaria was blind when she died on January 27, 1945, at the age of 93. Her seven children were successful in their chosen fields; Caridad was the donor of the Jaguimit barrio school site, Felicita became a nurse, Ramon became a pharmacist, politician, and historian. Pomposa and Filomena were teachers, Discoro became the first elementary school principal of Dueñas and Jose was the first Filipino district supervisor for five Iloilo towns.

=== Legacy ===
- In her honor, on August 28, 1973, the National Historical Institute installed a marker at her birthplace.
- Nazaria Lagos Monument was built in her honor.

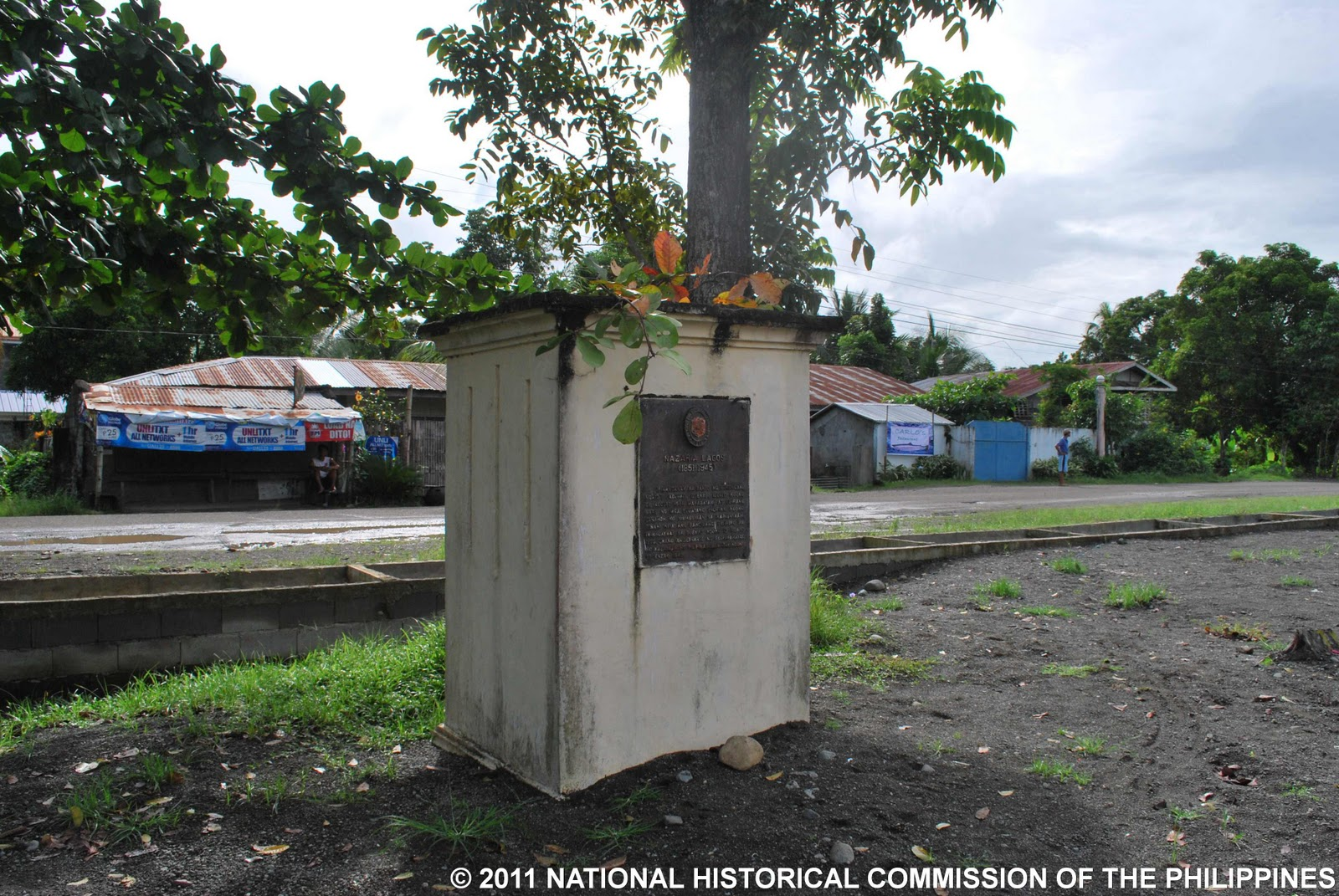
Nazaria Lagos Monument
