= My Big Bossing =

- Theatrical release poster
- Directed by: Tony Y. Reyes (segment "Sirena"); Marlon Rivera (segment "Taktak"); Joyce Bernal (segment "Prinsesa")
- Written by: Bibeth Orteza
- Produced by: Ruth Racela
- Starring: Vic Sotto; Ryzza Mae Dizon
- Cinematography: Lito Mempin (segment "Sirena"); Lee Meily (segments "Taktak" and "Prinsesa")
- Edited by: Chrisel Desuasido (segment "Sirena"); Marya Ignacio (segments "Prinsesa" and "Taktak"); Joyce Bernal (segment "Prinsesa")
- Music by: Jessie Lasaten (segment "Sirena"); Vincent de Jesus (segment "Taktak"); Carmina Cuya (segment "Prinsesa")
- Production companies: Octoarts Films; M-Zet Productions; APT Entertainment
- Distributed by: GMA Pictures
- Release date: December 25, 2014
- Running time: 125 minutes
- Country: Philippines
- Language: Filipino
- Budget: ₱80 million (estimated)
- Box office: ₱140 million (estimated)

My Big Bossing is a 2014 Filipino comedy anthology film starring Vic Sotto, Ryzza Mae Dizon and Marian Rivera. The standalone sequel to the 2013 family film My Little Bossings, it is one of the official entries of the 40th Metro Manila Film Festival, and was released on December 25, 2014.

Unlike its predecessor, My Big Bossing features an anthology of children's fantasy stories and has no connection with the previous film. The film also revolves around Ryzza's portrayals of different characters throughout the film's story arcs.

== Plot ==
=== "Sirena" ===
A little girl named Jessa wishes to be a mermaid. This wish is granted when Jessa drowns in a swimming pool after meeting a witch (Pauleen Luna), transforming her into a mermaid-goldfish hybrid.

=== "Taktak" ===
A little girl dies and helps an unbeliever who works as a reporter to cope with his beliefs.

=== "Prinsesa" ===
Biiktoria, a princess, was said to be an ugly girl so the sister of the Queen, together with her husband, planned to exchange her with her son as a prince of the kingdom to someday become a king. The princess lives with pigs so she thinks that she is also a pig. In the end, Torius proclaimed that the princess' name came from his, therefore she was named Victoria. She is recognized by her father, the king, who is sick and accepts her even if she is ugly.

== Cast ==
=== Sirena ===
- Vic Sotto as Bossing
- Ryzza Mae Dizon as Jessa
- Manilyn Reynes as Jessa's mother
- Pauleen Luna as Tandang Wishy
- Wally Bayola as the barangay captain
- Jerald Napoles as Kagawad

=== Taktak ===
- Vic Sotto as Vince
- Ryzza Mae Dizon as Angel
- Marian Rivera as Clarissa
- Jose Manalo as Buboy
- Nico Antonio as Dody
- Chlaui Malayao
- Cris Villonco
- Alwyn Uytingco

=== Prinsesa ===
- Vic Sotto as Torius
- Ryzza Mae Dizon as Biiktoria/Prinsesa Victoria
- Nikki Gil as Reyna Beatriz
- Rufa Mae Quinto as Fairy Kapangyarihan
- Alonzo Muhlach as Prinsipe Vladimir
- Zoren Legaspi as Hari Lubo
- Niño Muhlach as Duke Chorvu
- Maricar de Mesa as Princesa Marga
- Sef Cadayona as Warda / Wardo
- Rafa Siguion-Reyna
- Ruby Rodriguez as Bebang
