= Clarence Delgado =

Filipino actor

- Born: Clarence William Verzosa Delgado; Manila, Philippines
- Occupation: Actor
- Years active: 2011–present
- Agents: Star Magic (2011–2021); Sparkle GMA Artist Center (2021–present)

Clarence William Verzosa Delgado is a Filipino teen actor. He was discovered by Star Circle Quest 2011 where he won as The Male Winner. He had appeared in Goin' Bulilit and Way Back Home.

He transferred to GMA Network in 2021 and is currently an artist of Sparkle. He replaced Baste Granfon who supposed to play the role of Nathan Acosta in First Yaya.

== Filmography ==
=== Television ===
Year	Title	Role
2011	Star Circle Quest 2011	Contestant
2011	Maalaala Mo Kaya: TV	Enrico "Dindo" Habijan
2011	Happy Yipee Yehey	Guest
2011–2018	Goin' Bulilit	Himself
2011	Wansapanataym: RR Marcelino's Darmo Adarna	Young Dario
2011	Wansapanataym: Lobo Boy	Boboy
2011	Budoy	Max
2012	Kung Ako'y Iiwan Mo	Rap Raymundo
2012	Maalaala Mo Kaya: Relo	John
2012	Ina, Kapatid, Anak	Ivan Lagdameo
2013	Wansapanataym: Bokbok, Ang Batang Mapanubok	Bokbok
2013	Wansapanataym: Fruitcake	Marlon
2014	Home Sweetie Home	Rence Alcantara
2014	The Legal Wife	Young Samboy
2015	Wansapanataym: My Kung Fu Chinito	Keeno Magbanua
2015	Pangako Sa 'Yo	Bubwit
2015	Wansapanataym: Percy Maninisi	Percy
2016	Umagang Kay Ganda	Segment Host
2018	Wansapanataym: Ikaw Ang Ghosto Ko	Momoy
2021	Wish Ko Lang: Ghost Child	Angelo
2021	First Yaya	Nathan Acosta
2022	First Lady	Nathan Acosta
2022	Wish Ko Lang: Tuli	Angelo
2022	Happy Together	Tupe
2022	Magpakailanman: Ang Bulag Na Ilaw Ng Tahanan	Gerald
2022	Pepito Manaloto	Damian
2023	Magandang Dilag	Pio Salazar's son
2023	Magpakailanman: The Power Of Love	Arjay
2026	Rainbow Rumble	Contestant

=== Films ===
Year	Title	Role
2011	Way Back Home	Buboy Bartolome
2012	The Mistress	Mamon
2013	Status: It's Complicated	Dennis
2013	Pagpag: Siyam na Buhay	Mac-mac
2014	Muslim Magnum 357	Nico
2017	Can't Help Falling in Love	Prince Dela Cuesta
2020	Four Sisters Before the Wedding	Calvin John "CJ / Reb Reb" Salazar
