= Feng Shui 2 =

2014 film by Chito S. Roño

- Theatrical release poster
- Directed by: Chito S. Roño
- Screenplay by: Roy Iglesias; Chito S. Roño
- Story by: Chito S. Roño
- Produced by: Charo Santos-Concio; Malou N. Santos; Kristina Bernadette C. Aquino
- Starring: Kris Aquino; Coco Martin
- Cinematography: Neil Daza
- Edited by: Carlo Francisco Manatad
- Music by: Carmina Cuya
- Production companies: Star Cinema; K Productions
- Distributed by: ABS-CBN Film Productions
- Release date: December 25, 2014
- Running time: 102 minutes
- Country: Philippines
- Languages: Filipino; English (subtitles)
- Budget: ₱20 million (est.)
- Box office: ₱235 million

Feng Shui 2 (stylized as Feng Shui 二) is a 2014 Filipino supernatural horror film directed by Chito S. Roño, and a sequel to the 2004 film Feng Shui. Kris Aquino reprises her role as Joy Ramirez and Coco Martin plays Lester Anonuevo, the new owner of the cursed bagua. The film co-stars Cherry Pie Picache, Carmi Martin, Ian Veneracion, and Joonee Gamboa. It focuses on Lester (Martin) who, upon getting the cursed bagua mirror, starts to have luck and prosperity, but with deadly consequences. The film was also Star Cinema's official entry in the 2014 Metro Manila Film Festival.

It is also the first Filipino film to be rendered in 4D and was exclusively shown at the XD Theater of SM Mall of Asia under the partnership of SM Lifestyle Entertainment and Star Cinema.

== Plot ==
Ten years after the twin girls find the cursed bagua mirror in Joy Ramirez's old house, its new owner is horrified to find her dead husband lying on a toy tiger, revealing him to have been born in the year of the Tiger, as a result of the good luck from the mirror. The owner is urged to escape their condominium unit by the twins' ghosts, one of whom shot her sister and father before jumping off the condo's balcony and landing on a set of monkey bars—she was born in the year of the Monkey.

Lester Añonuevo, a hustler living in a slum, breaks into a Taoist temple to take the mirror, which has been stored by Hsui Liao for safekeeping, upon orders of Lotus Feet's niece, who wants to repatriate it to China. Despite returning it to her, the mirror reappears at Lester's house, showering him with luck. He repays his loan shark, Paulo, before the latter, who had stared into the mirror, fatally hits his head against a hotdog cart—he was born in the year of the Dog. He steals a wallet with a phone and an ATM card, which he redeems. His estranged father Robert comes and they move away. Before leaving the slum, Lester sees the ghost of Lotus Feet, the woman who cursed the mirror. Later that night, Lester's alcoholic mother Ruby dies after ingesting rat poison—she was born in the year of the Rat. This drives Lester to destroy the mirror. Joy, now a real estate agent, shows up but leaves immediately upon seeing the mirror, warning him not to accept any more good fortune. Afterwards, he finds the mirror intact.

After Ruby's funeral, Jack, a loan shark whom Lester had encountered in the slum, breaks into Lester's house but encounters Robert. After stabbing Robert to death, Jack is crushed by a fire extinguisher labeled "Red Rabbit". Lester realizes both of them were born in the year of the Rabbit as Jack's shirt has a Playboy bunny logo. Joy, Lily (who owned the mirror before Joy), and Hsui Liao go to Lester's house to talk about what happened after Lester stole the mirror. Hsui Liao realizes that the mirror is haunting Lester as well as its previous living owners as it is about to complete collecting the souls of its 12 previous owners corresponding to their zodiac animal. Hsui Liao also realizes that when Lotus Feet's niece tried to pacify her aunt and died, her soul joined Lotus Feet in claiming a pair of victims, which explains the deaths of Robert and Jack, as well as Lester's companions in the slum. The mirror then goes missing. At Lily's house, she finds the mirror but hides it, hoping for more good fortune. They head over to Joy's boyfriend Douglas, who shoots Lester after mistaking him for a burglar. Douglas proposes to Joy, who refuses after realizing that he had looked at the mirror.

Hsui Liao realizes that the only way to end the curse is to destroy the mirror in the temple and persuades Douglas to accompany him, Joy, and Lester. Meanwhile, Lily and her housemaid are electrocuted after pulling a wire connected to a dragon fountain, which they mistake for a buried piece of gold; she was born in the year of the Dragon. As they approach the temple, Douglas gets into a fight and is mauled. Hsui Liao glances at the mirror during the scuffle and is fatally stabbed, falling on a pile of chicharon—he was born in the year of the Pig, and Lester is attacked near some dog cages—he was born in the year of the Dog. When "Lester" and Joy reach the temple, they destroy the mirror together. Afterwards, Joy sees Lester lifeless, revealing that it was his ghost who helped her. She mourns as the police and Douglas arrive.

In the post-credits scene, Lester's girlfriend Ellen uploads a photo of the mirror sent by Lester for sale as her taxi suddenly encounters a truck with the words "Snake Island", indicating that she was born in the Year of the Snake.

== Cast ==
=== Main ===
- Kris Aquino as Joy Ramirez
- Coco Martin as Lester Anonuevo

=== Supporting ===
- Cherry Pie Picache as Lily Mendoza
- Ian Veneracion as Douglas
- Carmi Martin as Ruby Anonuevo
- Rez Cortez as Robert Anonuevo
- Joonee Gamboa as Hsui Liao
- Beauty Gonzalez as Ellen
- Ian De Leon as Jack
- Martin Escudero as Moy
- Raikko Mateo as Mio
- Diana Zubiri as woman whose ATM card was stolen by Lester
- Teodoro Baldemaro as Boss Paulo
- Elizabeth Chua as Lotus Feet's niece
- Rosita Lim as Mei Lien/Lotus Feet
- Kych Minemoto as Endon
- Randy See as Leonard
- Jenine Desiderio as the mother of the Twins
- Froilan Sales as the father of the Twins
- Joj and Jai Agpangan as the Twins

== Production ==
The idea of a sequel was created after Coco Martin approached director Chito S. Roño and Kris Aquino about the first film. Being a fan of the original movie in 2004, Martin asked Aquino and Roño if they would be interested in a sequel, and said that he would be glad to join them. Roño and Aquino decided that after ten years, it was the right time for the sequel.

The shooting of the film was set to commence by late August 2014. With the first cut of the film, Joy's character (Kris Aquino) was not present for most of the story. Because of this, the producers asked for re-shoots, to give her additional screen time.

The first official trailer of the film was attached to the Star Cinema romantic comedy film Past Tense, which was released on November 22, 2014.

== Reception ==
The film was met with high expectations by fans since the first movie had been a cult classic, considered the 'scariest Filipino horror film ever'.

The film received a mixed to positive response from critics, who cited the outstanding performances of Coco Martin and Cherry Pie Picache but said the film lacked the originality of the first movie. They also applauded Kris Aquino's performance, saying it was a great improvement from her past horror films.

Audiences received the film more positively, citing it as a worthy sequel.

== Box office ==
The film became the second-highest-grossing film at the 2014 Metro Manila Film Festival. It now holds the title of having the highest opening gross of any non-MMFF Filipino horror film of all time, having earned a total of ₱235.0 million at the box office.

== See also ==
- List of ghost films
