= Gregoria de Jesús =

Filipino revolutionary (1875–1943)

- Portrait of Gregoria de Jesús

Personal details
- Born: Gregoria de Jesús y Álvarez; May 9, 1875 Caloocan, Manila, Captaincy General of the Philippines, Spanish Empire
- Died: March 15, 1943 (aged 67) City of Greater Manila, Philippine Commonwealth
- Resting place: Manila North Cemetery, Manila, Philippines
- Party: Katipunan
- Spouses: Andrés Bonifacio (m. 1893; died 1897) Julio Nakpil (m. 1898)
- Children: 7 (including Juan Nakpil)
- Occupation: Housewife, politician

Gregoria de Jesús y Álvarez (May 9, 1875 – March 15, 1943), also known by her nickname Oriang, acted as secretary of the women's section and also the custodian of the documents and seal of the Katipunan. She married Andrés Bonifacio, the Supremo of the Katipunan and President of the Katagalugan Revolutionary Government. She played a major role in the Philippine Revolution. After the death of Bonifacio, she married Julio Nakpil, one of the generals of the revolution. She had one son from Bonifacio and five children from Nakpil.

== Early life ==
Gregoria de Jesús was born in the town of Caloocan, then in the province of Manila, to a middle-class, pious Roman Catholic family. Her father, Nicolás de Jesús, was a carpenter who later served as a gobernadorcillo. As a young girl, she was an exceptional student and a silver medal recipient in an examination organized by the Governor-General and the local parish priest. When she became a secondary school student, she was induced by her parents to stay home and look after her younger sister and the family farm, since both of her older brothers had moved to Manila to continue their educations.

== First marriage and the Philippine Revolution ==
When De Jesús was only 18 years old, Andrés Bonifacio fell in love with her and wanted to marry her. He revealed his intentions to her parents, but her father disapproved of the marriage because Bonifacio was a Freemason. Bonifacio nevertheless continued to pursue De Jesús, and after almost six months of courtship, she had fallen in love with him. She revealed that to her father and asked for his approval on their marriage, to which he eventually agreed.

Before they got married in March 1893, she joined the Katipunan adopting the name Lakambini (Tagalog, "noblewoman", also "goddess" or "Muse"). They had a traditional religious wedding at the Binondo Church, followed a week later by a ceremony according to the Katipunan's rites, as the society's members did not approve of their marriage in the Catholic Church, which was seen as an oppressive colonial force. On the evening of the same day, the women's chapter of the Katipunan was formed, and she was appointed its vice-president and the custodian of the society's documents, swearing fealty to the group's purposes. When the Guardia Civil inspected homes unannounced, De Jesús would gather all the secret society's documents and drive all night around town in a calesa, returning home only when assured of safety.

A year later, she returned to her family's house because she was pregnant. She gave birth to their only son, whom she christened Andrés after her husband. Two months later, during Holy Week of 1896, Gregoria and her husband returned to Manila to find their house destroyed by a fire. The couple with their child were then forced to live in friends' and relatives' houses, but had to move quickly from house to house. A few months later, their infant son died of smallpox.

On August 19, 1896, the Katipunan was exposed by Teodoro Patiño, a disgruntled member. The Spanish forces reacted quickly to halt the revolution. Many Filipinos were arrested, jailed, and shot, but Bonifacio and De Jesús went into hiding. The Spanish government was able to tighten its surveillance over the Katipunan. The remaining Katipuneros gathered and planned an attack on a Spanish gunpowder storehouse. With an army of almost 800, the Katipuneros were successful in their first attack, and were encouraged to advance to Manila, but Spanish reinforcements arrived, routing the Katipuneros, hundreds of whom were killed or captured in the skirmish. Furthermore, an internal conflict in the Katipunan between the Magdiwang and the Magdalo faction in the province of Cavite—had weakened the society.

On April 28, 1897, Gregoria De Jesús, Bonifacio, along with her brother Procopio were captured by Aguinaldo's men, led by Agapito Bonzón and José Ignacio Paua, in Indang, Cavite. Andrés was shot in the arm by Bonzón and Paua, who stabbed him in the neck, was prevented from striking further by one of Bonifacio's men, who offered to die in the Supermo's stead. Another Bonifacio brother, Ciriaco was shot dead, while Procopio was beaten; Bonzón may have even raped De Jesús during the attack.

The brothers were found guilty and sentenced to death on charges that included sedition, and later executed on May 10, 1897, in the mountains of Maragondon, Cavite.

== Later life and death ==
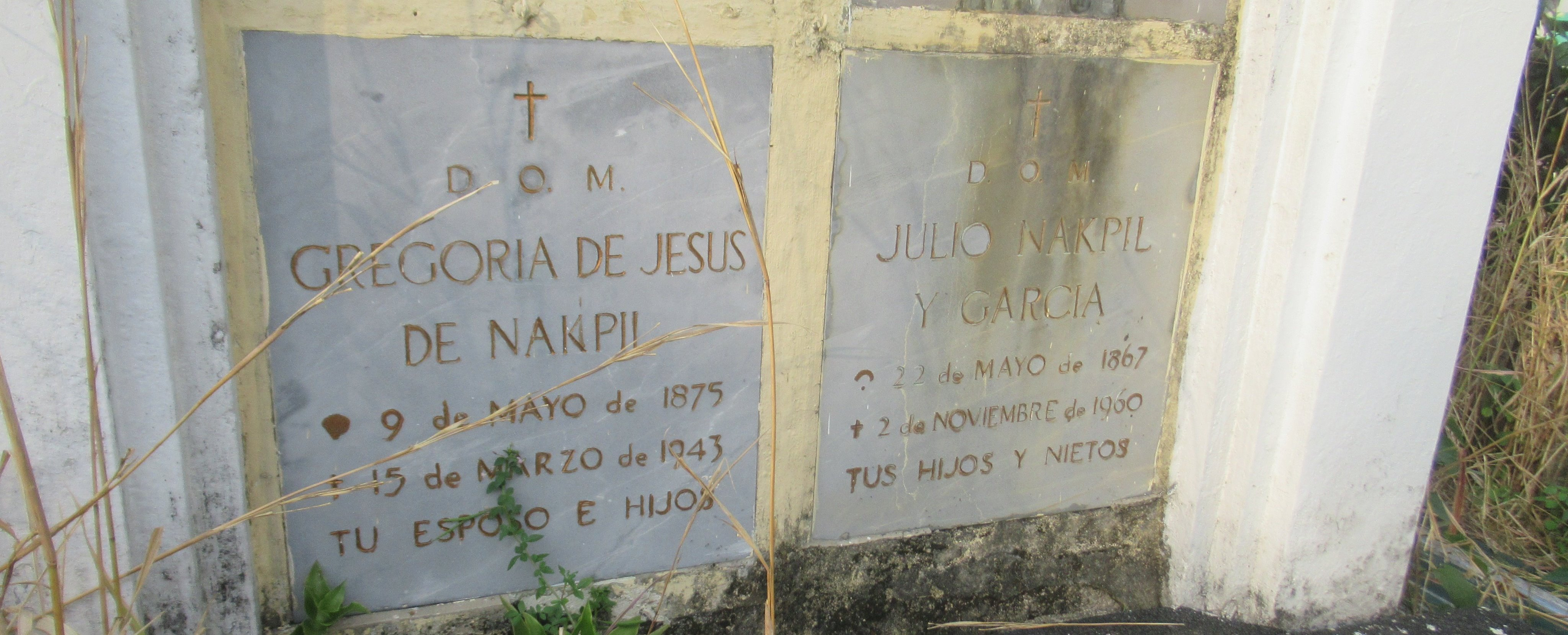
Grave of de Jesús and Julio Nakpil at the Manila North Cemetery

Julio Nakpil, a commander of the Katipunan forces in northern Philippines loyal to Bonifacio, took care of the widowed De Jesús. The two fell in love and were married at Quiapo Church in Manila on December 10, 1898. After the end of the Philippine Revolution, De Jesús lived with Nakpil and their six children in a house of Nakpil's sister, Petrona, and her husband, philanthropist Dr. Ariston Bautista, in Quiapo, Manila. The childless Bautistas cared for De Jesús and her children, helped raise and educate them. The house is known today as the Bahay Nakpil-Bautista, dedicated to the history of its former residents.

De Jesús later died in 1943 during the Japanese Occupation of the Philippines.

== In popular culture ==
- Portrayed by Lovely Rivero in the 1996 TV series, Bayani.
- Portrayed by Danielle Castaño in the 2010 film, Ang Paglilitis ni Andres Bonifacio.
- Portrayed by Sunshine Cruz in the 2012 film, El Presidente.
- Portrayed by Nica Naval in the 2012 film, Supremo.
- Portrayed by Glaiza de Castro in the 2013 TV series, Katipunan and 2014 TV series Ilustrado.
- Portrayed by Vina Morales in the 2014 film, Bonifacio: Ang Unang Pangulo.
- Portrayed by Kris Bernal in the 2017 docufilm, The Lakambini of the Katipunan.
- Portrayed by Elora Españo, Lovi Poe, and Gina Pareño in the 2025 film, Lakambini: Gregoria de Jesus.
- Portrayed by Marynor Madamesila in the 2025 stage musical, Gregoria Lakambini.

== Site Link ==
- GREGORIA DE JESUS (in English)
- Gregoria de Jesus:Lakambini of the Katipunan (in English)
- National Heroes of the Philippines
- Solidarity Philippines Australia Network Retrieved 2006-12-28. (in English)
