= Bonifacio: Ang Unang Pangulo =

- Theatrical release poster
- Directed by: Enzo Williams
- Written by: Enzo Williams
- Screenplay by: Enzo Williams; Carlo Obispo; Keiko Aquino
- Story by: Enzo Williams
- Based on: Life of Andres Bonifacio
- Produced by: Rina Navarro; E.A. Rocha
- Starring: Robin Padilla
- Narrated by: Eddie Garcia
- Cinematography: Carlo Mendoza
- Edited by: Benjamin Tolentino
- Music by: Von de Guzman
- Production companies: Philippians Productions; Tuko Film Productions; Buchi Boy Productions; RCP Productions
- Distributed by: Solar Entertainment
- Release date: December 25, 2014
- Running time: 100 minutes
- Country: Philippines
- Language: Filipino
- Box office: ₱10 million

Bonifacio: Ang Unang Pangulo (lit. 'Bonifacio: The First President') is a 2014 Philippine historical action drama film centering on the life of Katipunan revolutionary Andres Bonifacio. It was an official entry to the 40th Metro Manila Film Festival.

== Plot ==
The film begins with the execution of GOMBURZA in the aftermath of the 1872 Cavite Mutiny. On July 3, 1892, Dr. Jose Rizal establishes La Liga Filipina, a peaceful reform movement that aims to unite all Filipinos and give them one voice. One of its members is Andres Bonifacio, who is currently supporting his siblings, as both their parents died due to illness. Rizal is later arrested after the Spanish authorities uncover the organization. Bonifacio then decides to form the Katipunan to lead a revolution against the Spanish colonizers.

With the help of his friend Teodoro Plata, he meets Gregoria de Jesús, who is also known as Bantug and Oriang. Bonifacio visits the church, meeting Bantug again. She knows that he joined a group of Masons and is not religious. Bonifacio denies the accusations, saying that those are just inventions of the friars. Later that day, while walking on the street, they encounter a friend of Oriang, begging a friar to give his salary in the polo. However, the friar refuses and instead makes derogatory remarks towards the man. Later, he is shot by one of the Spanish soldiers due to his attempt on attacking the man, who later issues a threatening warning to everyone in the vicinity. Afterwards, the man's father mourns over the death of his son.

Bonifacio and Oriang's relationship develops and they finally marry after Bantug's parents give their approval. Then while recruiting additional katipuneros, Bonifacio finds out that Teodoro and his sister Nonay are lovers. The following day, a gobernadorcillo named Emilio Aguinaldo is inducted to the Katipunan.

The Katipunan starts publishing the newspaper Ang Kalayaan through the printing press of Diario de Manila. They distribute the papers to their fellow countrymen to further expand the organization. However, word of these subversive activities eventually reaches the Spanish authorities. After hearing this, the Spanish raid the Katipunan's Binondo press office wherein they discover Ang Kalayaan. Because of this discovery, they begin to grow wary of anti-government activities.

Afterwards, one of the paper's publishers is tortured. Upon seeing the man's dead body, Bonifacio calls all the Katipuneros to gather in Tandang Sora's home. Tandang Sora gives a sword to Bonifacio for him to use during their fights against the Spaniards. Later on, Bonifacio declares the start of the revolution on August 29, 1896. All men and women tear their cedulas and they scream, "Mabuhay ang Katipunan! Mabuhay ang rebolusyon! Mabuhay ang Supremo!"

On the day of the revolution, they cross a river and secretly pull a foot of one of the Spanish soldiers while the other one is shot by Bonifacio. In the entrance of one of the officials' houses, Bonifacio throws a torch that is lit up in the trolley loaded with canisters and shoots it, letting them get inside the gate. A battle then ensues between the revolutionaries and the Spanish garrison. Eventually, Bonifacio is able to kill the Spanish commander by stabbing. After the battle, the Katipuneros replace the flag of Spain with the KKK flag.

Aguinaldo's comrades are concerned that the revolution might die under Bonifacio's leadership. They advise Aguinaldo to urge Bonifacio to come to Cavite to reunify the factions of the Magdiwang and Magdalo and hold an election for it. Aguinaldo is elected as the president, while Bonifacio is only elected as the interior minister. A Magdalo member, Daniel Tirona, objects to his election and insults him, angering Bonifacio who then challenges Tirona to a duel. Feeling discriminated, Bonifacio, as Supremo of the Katipunan, voids the election results. The newly formed, Aguinaldo-led revolutionary group is concerned about the unity of Katipunan after failing to persuade Bonifacio to join them. Aguinaldo then orders the capture of Bonifacio, during which Bonifacio is stabbed at the neck and suffers a gunshot wound in his arm. His brother Ciriaco is shot dead, while his other brother Procopio is beaten, and Oriang possibly raped by Col. Agapito Bonzón. Suffering from his untreated wounds, Bonifacio tells Oriang of his dream of finally achieving his wish of the country's independence against Spain. Later on, Andres and Procopio Bonifacio are sentenced to death.

At the end of the film, Bonifacio is shown holding his personal flag aloft while leading his troops in a charge against Spanish forces. His personal flag slowly turns into the present Philippine Flag. In the post-credits scene, Antonio Luna makes a cameo appearance (an actual part as a preparation for the film Heneral Luna).

== Cast ==
=== Main cast ===
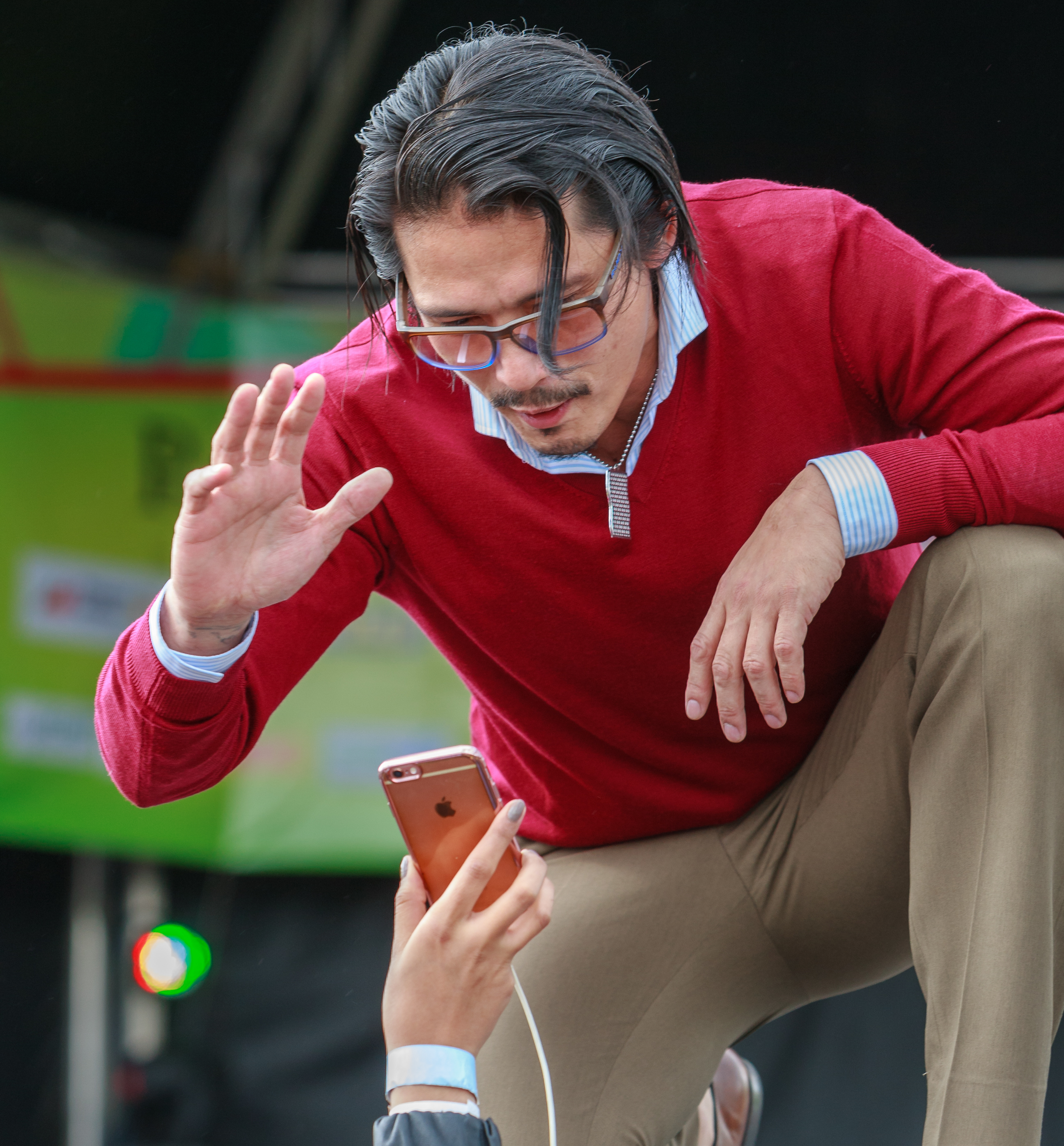
Robin Padilla portrays Andres Bonifacio.

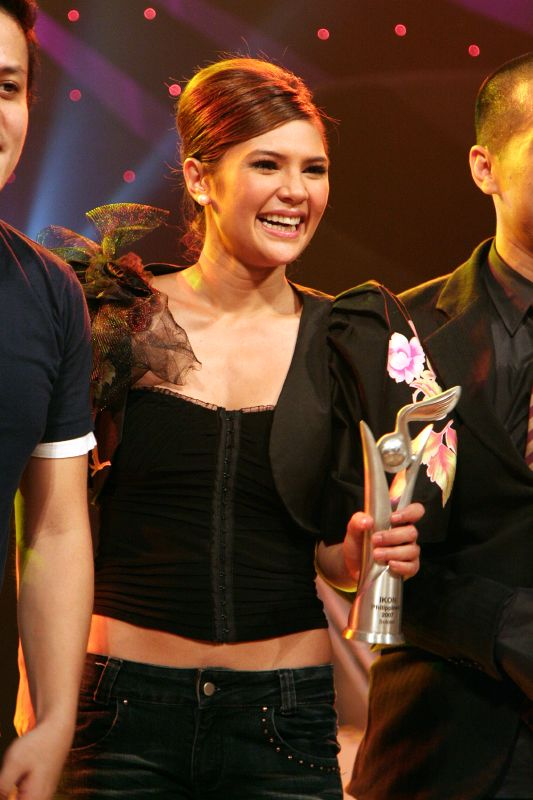
Vina Morales as Gregoria del Jesus / Oriang.

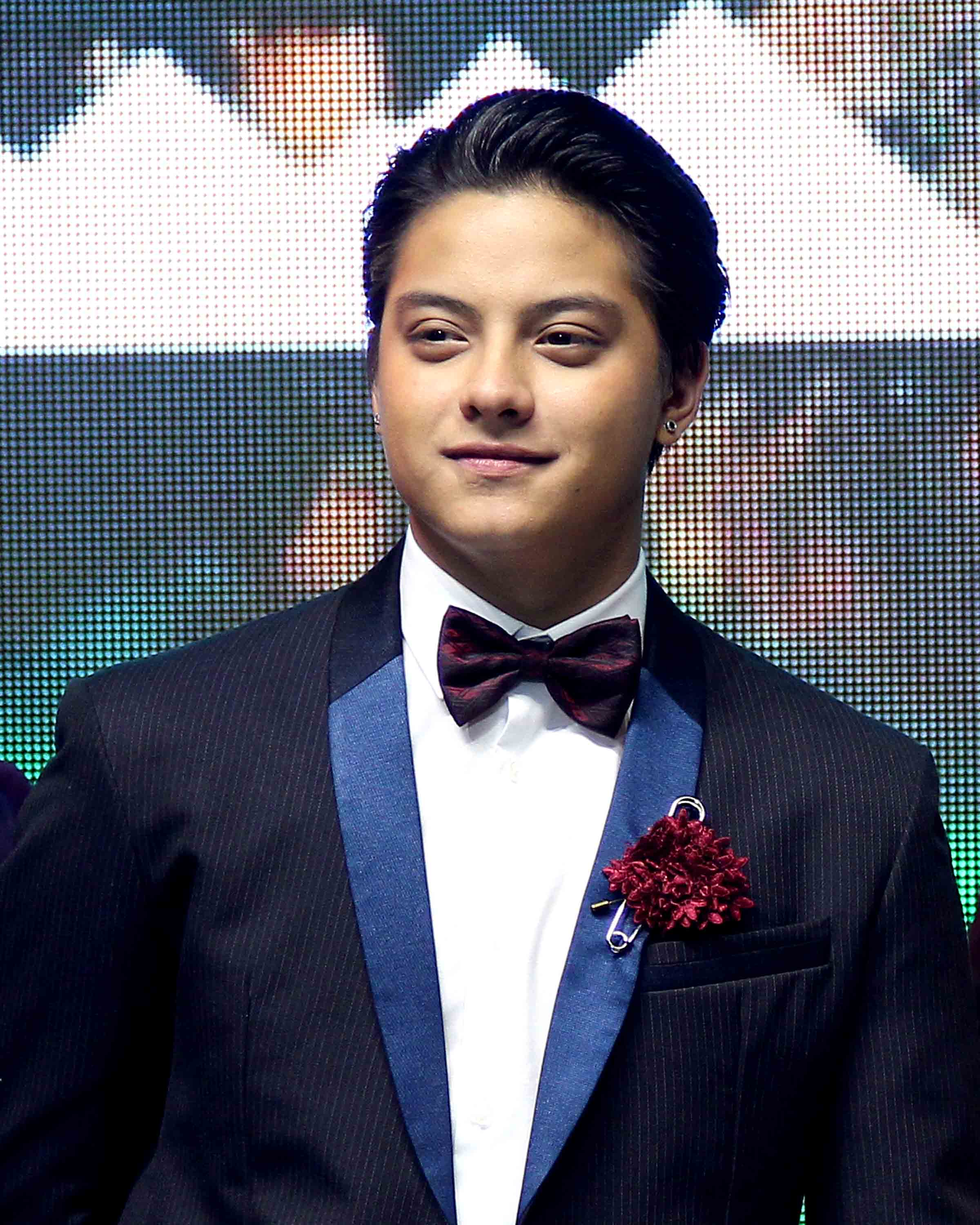
Daniel Padilla portrays Joaquin.

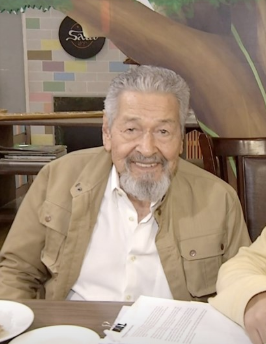
Eddie Garcia portrays Museum of Philippine Political History curator.

- Robin Padilla as Andrés Bonifacio
- Vina Morales as Gregoria "Oriang" de Jesús
- Eddie Garcia as Museum of Philippine Political History curator
- Daniel Padilla as Joaquin
- Jasmine Curtis-Smith as Andrea
- RJ Padilla as Gary

=== Supporting cast ===
- Jericho Rosales as José Rizal
- Isabel Oli as Espiridiona "Nonay" Bonifacio
- Joem Bascon as Emilio Jacinto
- Rommel Padilla as Padre Mariano Gómez
- Isko Moreno as Padre José Burgos
- Dennis Marasigan as Padre Jacinto Zamora
- E.A. Rocha as El Heneral
- Fernando Ortigas as Glaring Friar
- Ping Medina as Ladislao Diwa
- Richard Quan as Teodoro Plata
- Junjun Quintana as Procopio Bonifacio
- Cholo Barretto as Ciriaco Bonifacio
- Miguel Faustmann as Padre Gil
- Lou Veloso as Tatang
- Bon Vibar as Governor Ramón Blanco
- Jun Nayra as Emilio Aguinaldo
- Crispin Pineda as Moisés
- Pepe Herrera as Filipino Worker
- Mike Gayoso as Lázaro Macapagal
- Mon Confiado as Col. Agapito Bonzón
- Erlinda Villalobos as Melchora Aquino
- Bong Cabrera as Teodoro Patiño

=== Additional cast ===
- Joshua Lichtenberg as young Andrés Bonifacio
- Hector Zaghi as young Padre Gil
- Dominic Roque as Bully 1
- Patrick Sugui as Bully 2
- Ivan Pierre as Bully 3
- Jioca Javier as Máxima Bonifacio
- David Agonia as Troadio Bonifacio
- Richard Manabat as Deodato Arellano
- Ernie dela Cruz as Valentin Díaz
- Francisco Godoy as José Dizon
- Ces Aldaba as Nicolás de Jesús
- Jeanne Vicars as Baltazara Álvarez Francisco
- Ruth Alferez as Josefa Rizal
- Maki Calilung as Trinidad Rizal
- Rina Navarro as Marina Dizon
- Rick Sanchez as Pío Valenzuela
- Myla Angelica Nagal Ajero as Honoria Patiño
- Juliana Ysla as Sor Teresa
- Julius Java as Spanish Lieutenant 1
- Henry Strzalkowski as Spanish Lieutenant 2
- Jan Urbano as Baldomero Aguinaldo
- Lawrence Roxas as Daniel Tirona
- Apollo Abraham as Mariano Álvarez
- Jack Love Falcis as Artemio Ricarte
- Alireza Libre as Aristón Villanueva
- Arkin Villanueva as Edilberto Evangelista
- Alex Laquindanum as José del Rosario
- Jet Edu as Diego Mojica
- Marol Eugenio as Feliz Topacio

== Production ==
Philippians Productions is the studio responsible for the conception of Bonifacio. Enzo Williams, a Los Angeles City College graduate was the director for the film. Williams was aided by cinematographer Carlo Mendoza, production designer Roy Lachica, musical scorer Von de Guzman, and stunt director Sonny Sison who has worked for Hollywood. Producers are Rina Navarro and Eduardo Rocha.

According to Williams, he did six months of research before working on the film. The film was entirely shot with an Arri Alexa camera with anamorphic lenses and a complete ArriRaw post-production workflow, and was edited using processes which are also used in major Hollywood movies such as Gravity and Iron Man 3. Bonifacio is the first film in the Philippines to use the technology.

Robin Padilla, who usually does his own fight choreography, entrusted himself to the production staff's hired choreographer.

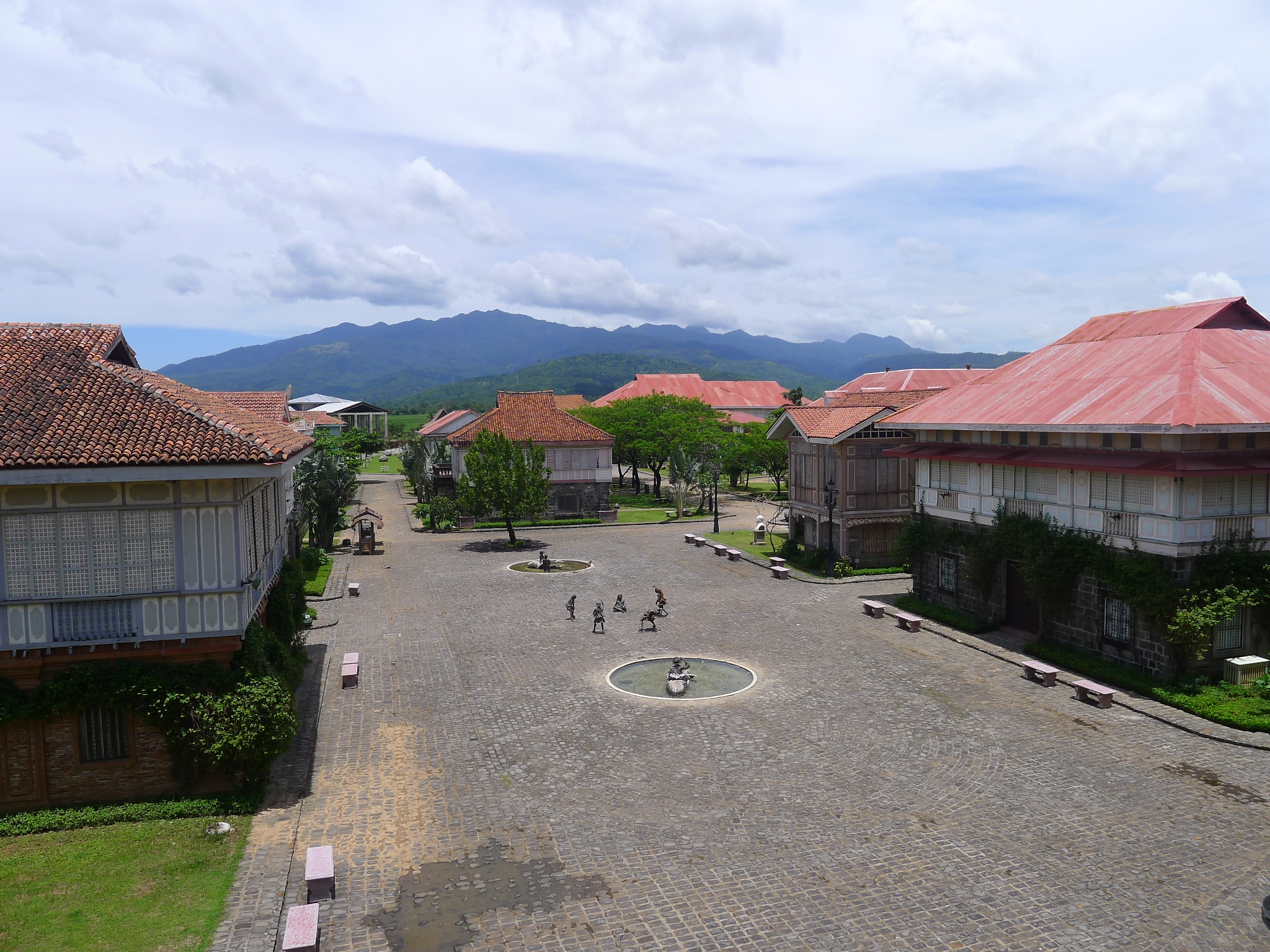
A part of the film was shot at the Las Casas Filipinas de Acuzar in Bataan.

Williams supervised the work of the location managers to locate a suitable location for a scene during the shooting of the film. The production staff resorts to a building sets if a suitable location for a certain scene satisfying Williams' standards can not be found. The fort of El Polvorín, the Aguinaldo Shrine and the house of the La Liga Filipina meetings were among those recreated as sets. Part of the film was shot in Pagsanjan where the production staff erected a big battleground set for a scene. Shootings also took place at the heritage resort of Las Casas Filipinas de Acuzar in Bagac, Bataan. The production expenses of the film exceeded the original budget. The production budget for the film is ₱100 million excluding expenses for the promotion of the film.

In casting Gregoria de Jesús, Bonifacio's wife also known as Oriang, in the film, Williams asked star actor Robin Padilla, who portrayed Bonifacio for his opinion and suggested Vina Morales to portray Oriang. Iza Calzado was originally to portray Oriang, but did not due to scheduling conflicts.

The film was initially planned to be released under the title Bonifacio, Gusto Mo Ba Siyang Makilala? (English: Bonifacio, Do you Want to Know Him?).

== Release ==
The film opened on December 25, 2014, but the film did not do well at the box office. Robin Padilla said that the movie only earned ₱10 million against its 100 million budget. The film ended its theatrical run at the 7th place.

=== International release ===
The “international version” includes English subtitles, fresh footage and additional content featuring lead star Robin Padilla, was first shown in Barcelona, Spain earlier 2015, had its U.S. premiere in New York City, screenings in Los Angeles in December the same year.

== Accolades ==
Bonifacio: Ang Unang Pangulo won the most awards at the 40th Metro Manila Film Festival among the eight entries for the mainstream category of the film festival, receiving nine awards including Best Picture. The awarding ceremony was held at the PICC Plenary Hall on December 27, 2014.

Year	Award-Giving Body	Category	Recipient(s) and nominee(s)	Result
2014	Metro Manila Film Festival Awards	Best Picture	Bonifacio: Ang Unang Pangulo	Won
2014	Metro Manila Film Festival Awards	Best Actor	Robin Padilla	Nominated
2014	Metro Manila Film Festival Awards	Best Actress	Vina Morales	Nominated
2014	Metro Manila Film Festival Awards	Best Director	Enzo Williams	Nominated
2014	Metro Manila Film Festival Awards	Best Cinematographer	Carlo Mendoza	Won
2014	Metro Manila Film Festival Awards	Best Sound Engineer	Wild Sound	Won
2014	Metro Manila Film Festival Awards	Best Musical Score	Von de Guzman	Won
2014	Metro Manila Film Festival Awards	Best Theme Song	"Hindi Pa Tapos" by Gloc-9 feat. Denise Barbacena	Won
2014	Metro Manila Film Festival Awards	Gat Puno Antonio Villegas Cultural Award	Bonifacio: Ang Unang Pangulo	Won
2014	Metro Manila Film Festival Awards	FPJ Memorial Award for Excellence	Bonifacio: Ang Unang Pangulo	Won
2014	Metro Manila Film Festival Awards	Best Float Award	Bonifacio: Ang Unang Pangulo	Won
2014	Metro Manila Film Festival Awards	Youth Choice Award	Bonifacio: Ang Unang Pangulo	Won

== Criticism ==
Critics of the film have pointed out many inconsistencies towards historical facts from Bonifacio's portrayal in the movie. A scene representing Bonifacio seeing the execution of GomBurZa was inaccurate, because no records show that he had met them in real life. Records also do not show Bonifacio meeting Jose Rizal in prison before the latter's banishment to Dapitan. There was no evidence that the La Liga Filipina directly led to the formation of the Katipunan, with a document entitled "Casaysayan" showing the movement's existence 7 months before its official established date on July 7, 1892, proving the Katipunan was established first before the La Liga Filipina. Scenes of Bonifacio's direct relations with Rizal may lead to misconceptions due to them being a "composite" of actual recorded historical events shown in one scene.

Many common incorrect beliefs about the historical figure being impoverished, dim-witted, hot-headed, and self-indulging however, were not portrayed in the movie. His common portrayal of having a modest personal upbringing from Tondo, Manila carrying connotations of being "The Great Plebian" were also misconceptions. Bonifacio also knows a few languages such as English and Spanish, most of which were evident from the collection of books in his own library as well as his previous job as a clerk-messenger.
