= Quinta Market =

Public market in Manila, Philippines

- Pamilihang Bayan ng Quinta; Mercado de la Quinta
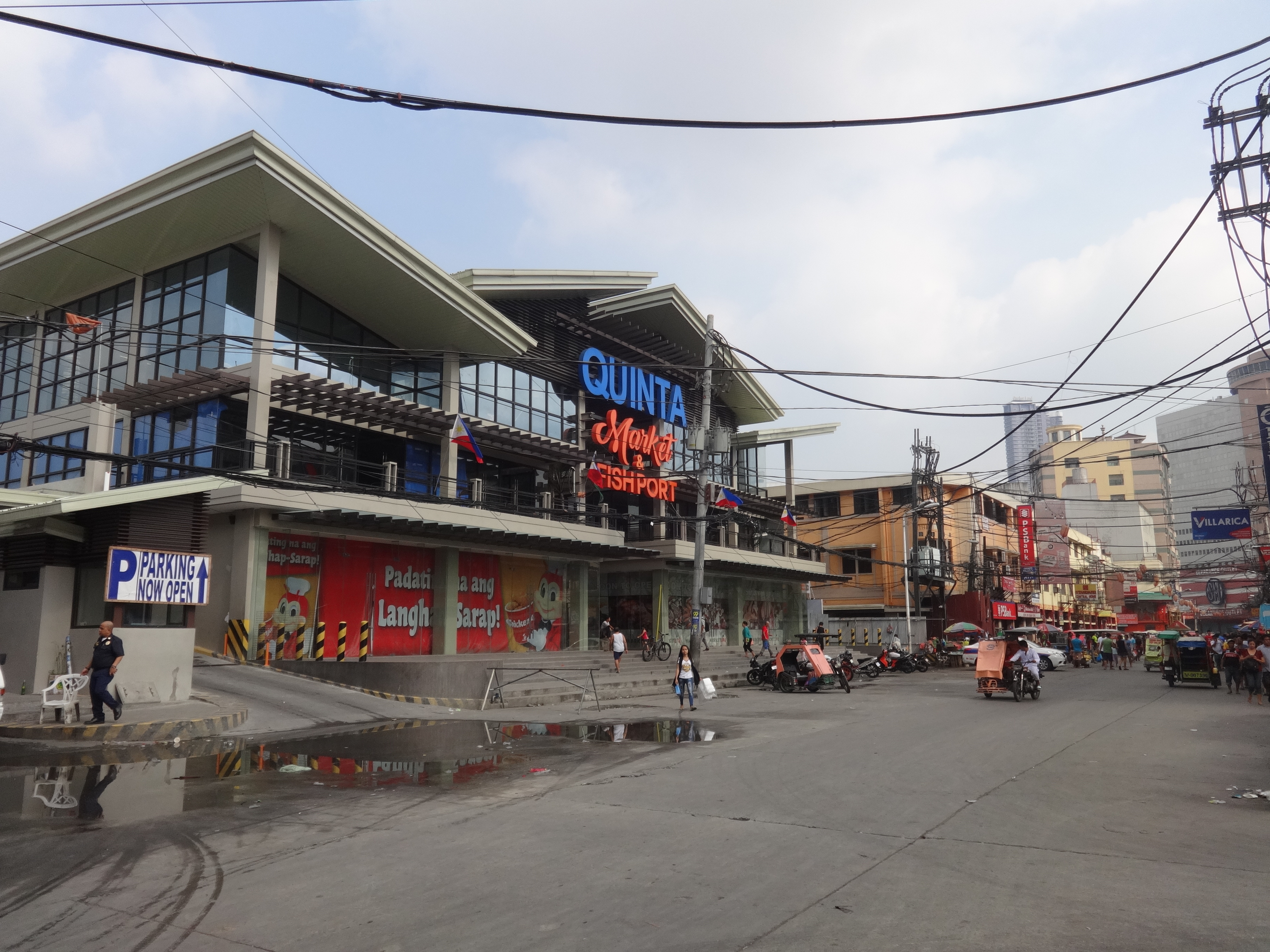
- The newly rebuilt Quinta Market and Fishport in June 2017
- Coordinates: 14°35′47.2″N 120°58′57.7″E
- Address: Carlos Palanca Street, Quiapo, Manila
- Opened: 1851 (establishment); April 19, 2017 (current building)
- Developer: Marketlife Management and Leasing Corporation
- Owner: City Government of Manila
- Num. of stores: 279
- Floors: 2
- Parking: 100 slots

Quinta Market (Filipino: Pamilihang Bayan ng Quinta; Spanish: Mercado de la Quinta), also known as Quiapo Market and officially called the Quinta Market and Fishport since 2017, is a palengke (public market) on Carlos Palanca (formerly Echague) Street in Quiapo, Manila, in the Philippines, along the banks of the Pasig River.

Established in the 19th century during the Spanish colonial period, Quinta Market was the central market of the City of Manila, originally catering to the wealthy families that lived in Quiapo at the time. By the early 20th century, the market had become one of the city's most important markets, generating significant revenues while also catering to residents of all social classes. However, growing congestion and the shift of business to new developments outside the city have led to its gradual decline, until the market was torn down and rebuilt in 2017 during the term of Mayor Joseph Estrada.

== History ==
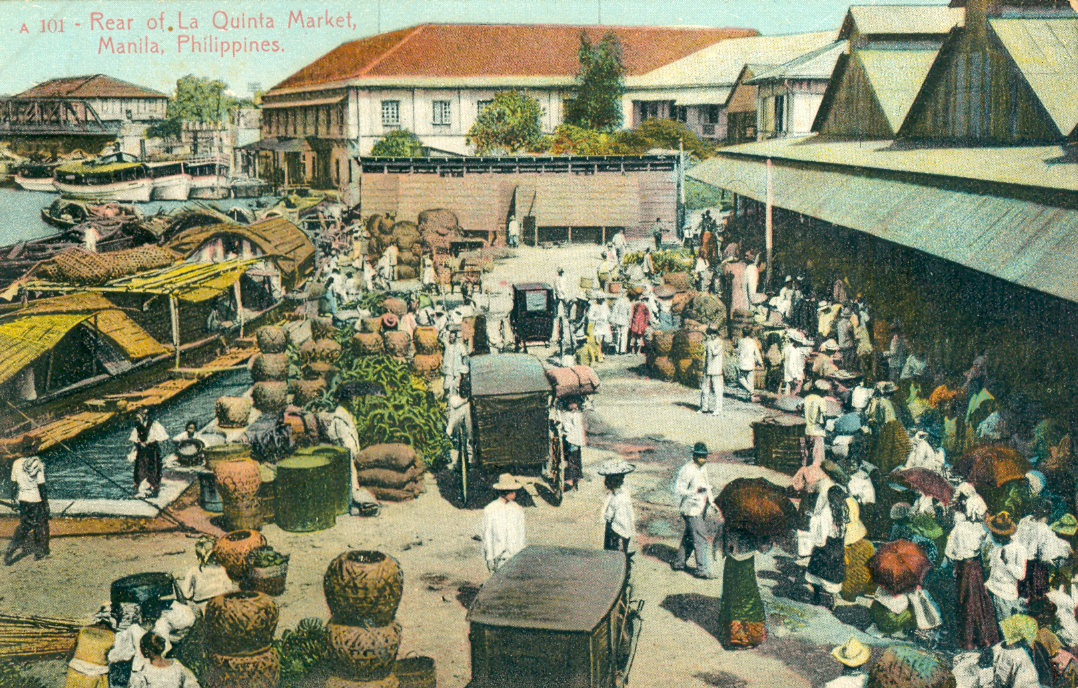
A postcard of Quinta Market in 1911, showing the rear of the market facing the Pasig River from the Puente Colgante

Quinta Market was built by the Spanish colonial government in 1851, the same year as the Divisoria Market in Tondo. Built with money bequeathed to the city government of Manila by businessman and philanthropist Francisco Carriedo in the 18th century, its establishment coincided with the growth of industry and trade in the city and the establishment of new public markets to complement existing venues for trade both in the city center and its suburbs. At the time, Quiapo was an attractive location for riverside villas along the Pasig River, and this was immortalized in the market's name, which translates to "country villa" in Spanish.

Also believed to be named after its surrounding countryside, the market originally sold vegetables grown in the farms around Quiapo. The next year, the market was connected to Arroceros in Ermita, where Manila's rice market was located, with the construction of the Puente Colgante, later replaced by the modern-day Quezon Bridge. At the time of its construction, Quinta Market was the most spacious public market in Manila, catering to the wealthy families living in Quiapo at the time, and thanks to its large port area it was also called the city's best market.

The original market however was shoddily built, and it was heavily damaged by earthquake in 1863, although commercial activity continued despite the destruction. The market was rebuilt in 1878 according to plans by Félix Rojas, the Philippines' first architect. Rojas also prepared plans for the reconstruction of several other structures destroyed in the earthquake, including the Santo Domingo Church in Intramuros. Subsequent plans for the market were drawn up on January 18, 1889, by a successor of Rojas, Juan José de las Hervás.

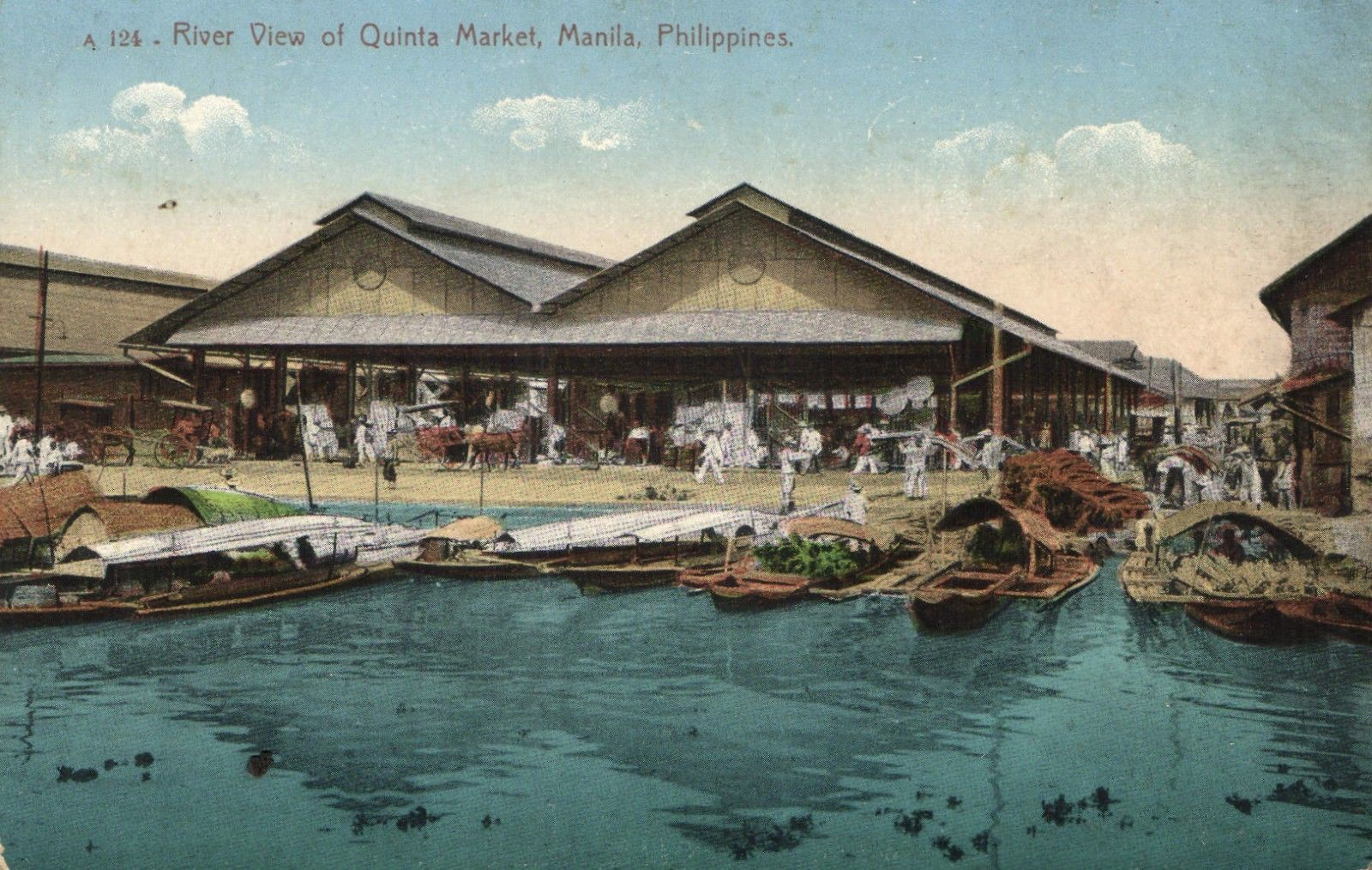
View of Quinta Market from the Pasig River in 1911.

On December 8, 1900, at the onset of the American colonization of the Philippines, new plans for the market were drawn up by Lieutenant Lytle Brown of the United States Army Corps of Engineers, who at the time was detailed as the city engineer of Manila. He oversaw the construction of a new, steel market building, constructed at a cost of US$67,821.29 (equivalent to $2,624,684 in 2025), and Quinta Market reopened to the public on October 21, 1901. During this time, the market was a popular wholesale market which was especially busy on Fridays, serving residents of all social classes, and certain items like beef were more available here than at other markets in the city. The market's importance was evident in the revenues it was generating for the city government: in 1908, the Quinta and Divisoria markets generated a combined 80 percent of the city's market fee collections.

Although Quinta Market was known for the wide variety of foodstuffs and other items sold under its roof and in the surrounding area, over the years it had been steadily overshadowed by the opening of new department stores and other retail concepts opening in Makati and Quezon City, as well as by the growing congestion in Quiapo caused by overdevelopment. By the 2000s, not only did it become just a regular retail market, it had also earned a reputation for being damp and filthy, surrounded by stagnant dirty water and ambulant fish vendors selling their wares on the street, to the inconvenience of marketgoers. In 2008, the market was renovated and the area cleaned up in anticipation of a last-minute visit by President Gloria Macapagal Arroyo.

Despite improvements to the structure over the years, the market itself was still generally considered to be dilapidated, which prompted the city government of Manila to build an entirely new market.

=== Construction of the Quinta Market and Fishport ===
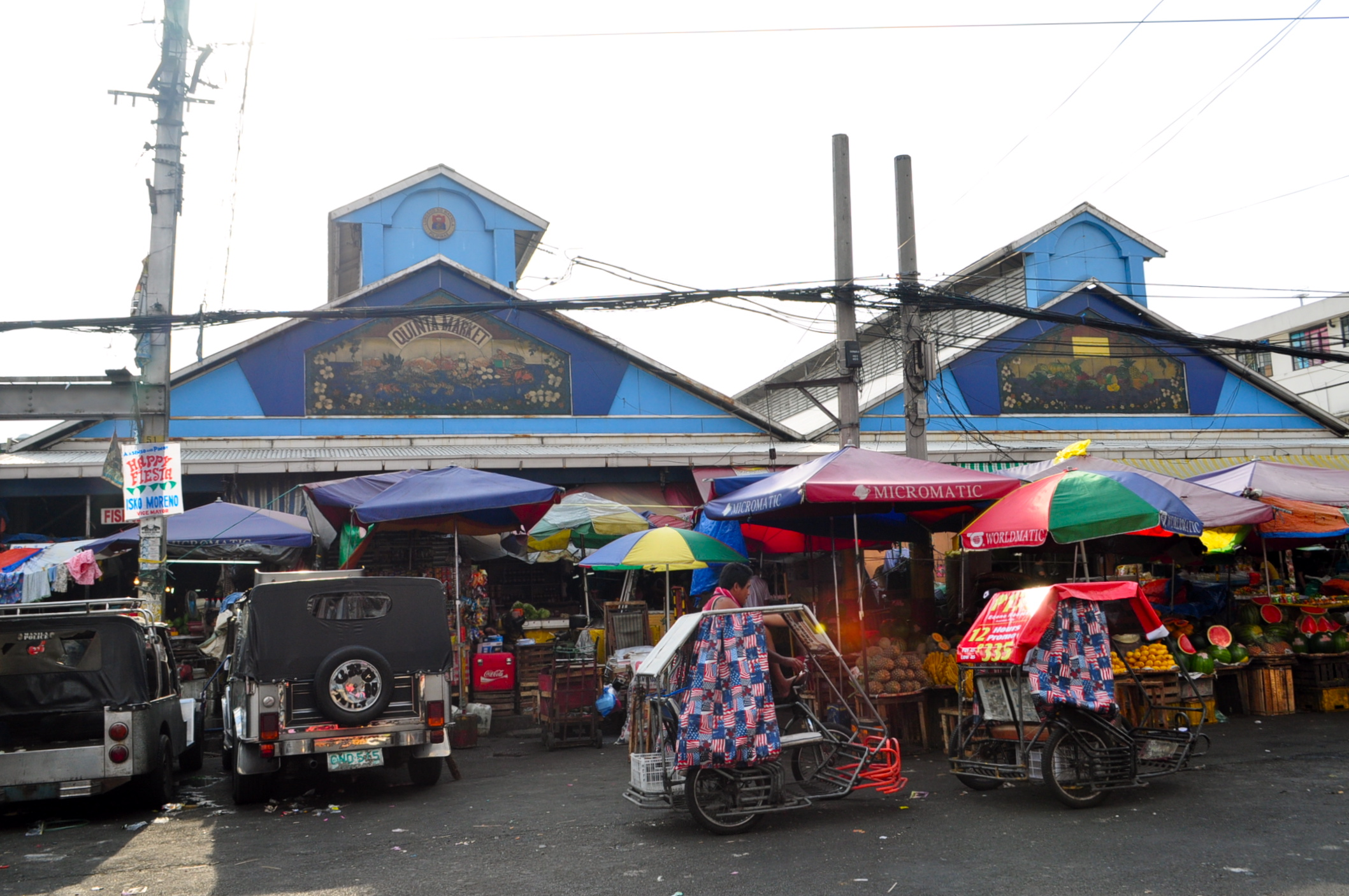
Quinta Market in 2011. In 2015, Manila Mayor Joseph Estrada had the old market buildings demolished to make way for the new Quinta Market and Fishport.

In 2014, the Manila City Council passed Ordinance No. 8346, allowing for the city government of Manila to enter into joint venture agreements with private companies and paving the way for the demolition and rehabilitation of several of the city's public markets. Quinta Market was named as the first market to be demolished and rebuilt under the ordinance.

The next year, Mayor Joseph Estrada announced the construction of a new Quinta Market, to be built at no cost to the city as part of a joint venture with Marketlife Management and Leasing Corporation, which submitted an unsolicited proposal on September 15, 2014. The agreement between the city government and Marketlife was signed on July 16, 2015, although the agreement was allegedly approved on October 20, 2014. Vendors inside the market sued the city government in an attempt to stop the demolition and the joint venture, concerned that they would either be evicted or subjected to higher fees under the scheme, as well as concerns that the market was effectively going to be privatized. Congressman Amado Bagatsing, who represents the fifth district of Manila and an opponent of the joint venture program, also sided with the vendors, claiming that due process was not followed since Estrada signed the joint venture agreement before the project underwent a public consultation process. The Manila Regional Trial Court however ruled against the vendors on July 25, 2015, ruling that the city had the right to develop the property "as an attribute of [its] ownership".

Demolition of the old Quinta Market took place two days later on July 27, 2015 at 8:00 am PST, although over 500 vendors attempted to physically stop the demolition. Estrada later confronted the vendors, chastising those who refused to yield. He also reassured vendors that the market was not being privatized, and he promised as well to issue "certificates of tenure" to some 270 affected vendors, which would serve as a guarantee that they would have a place in the new market without being subjected to fee increases. However, the following month some vendors filed graft charges against Estrada with the Office of the Ombudsman, claiming that he awarded the contract to Marketlife without undergoing a bidding process. In its defense, Marketlife said that while they only have ₱3.2 million in registered capital with the Securities and Exchange Commission – the minimum required by law – they have up to ₱200 million allocated for the market's construction from a combination of paid-up capital and bank financing. They also said that the proposal they submitted underwent due process, claiming that they had consulted vendors when instructed to do so and that the city government took its time in approving its proposal, despite submitting their proposal two months before the company was incorporated.

During the new market's construction, vendors were housed in orange steel boxes located around the market site, which would allow them to continue selling while construction was ongoing, which was estimated to take around 6–10 months. The new market's foundation was finished in November 2015, and by April 2016, the columns and flooring had been installed in addition to a portion of the new building's roof. However, the number of street vendors reportedly grew, out of concerns of high rents, while other vendors in the market have been unable to return. On April 19, 2017, Estrada's 80th birthday, the ₱150 million Quinta Market and Fishport was inaugurated and reopened to the public, the fifth market to be renovated under the city's market renovation program, with some 250 vendors reopening their stalls with the market's reopening.

In 2023, Senator Lito Lapid proposed the creation of a heritage zone for Quiapo which would include Quinta Market as one of the built heritage sites within the area.

== Structure and management ==
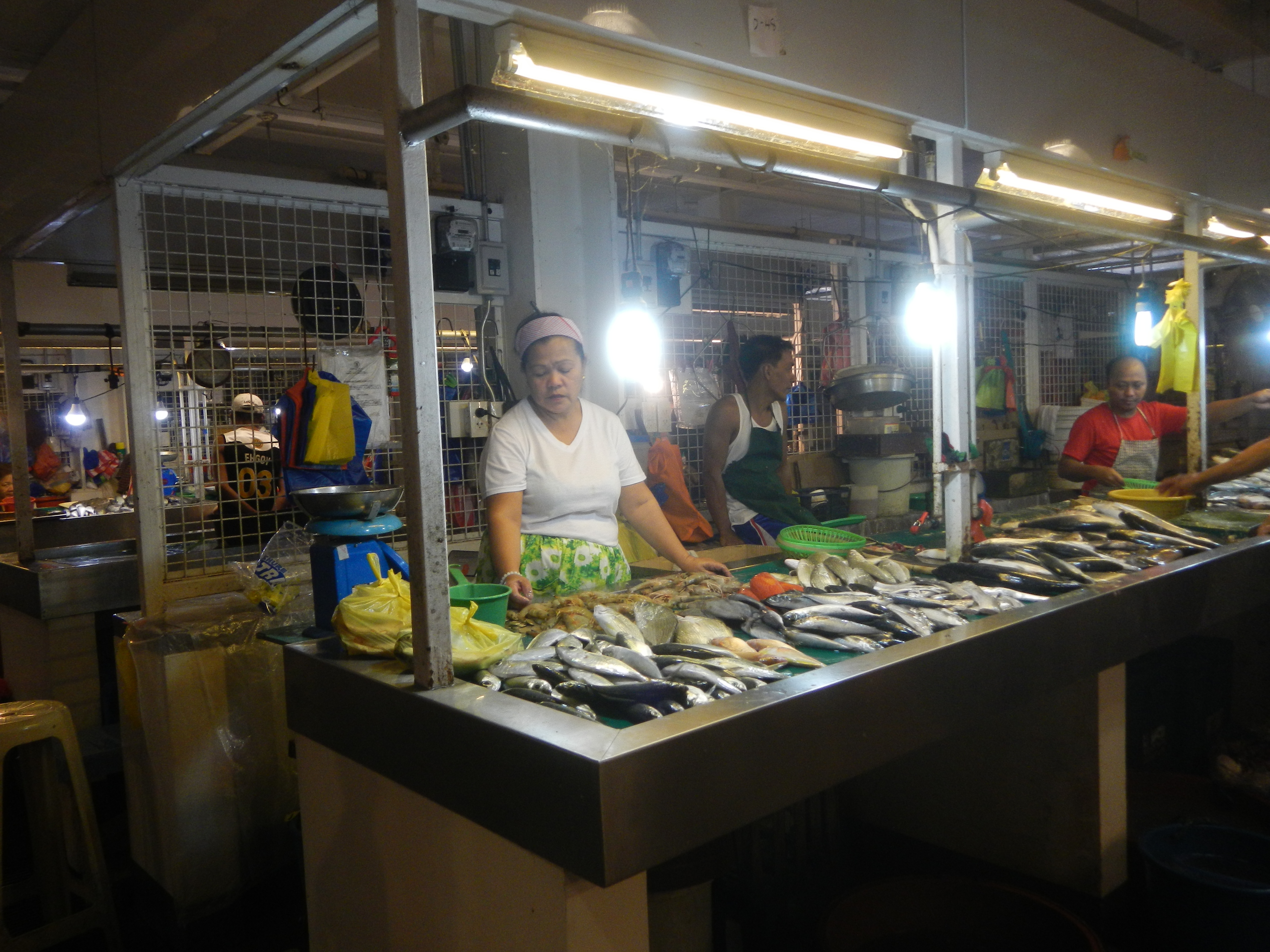
A fish vendor at the new Quinta Market and Fishport

The current Quinta Market and Fishport is a two-storey structure, fulfilling Estrada's vision of a "modern, convenient and mall-like public market". Replacing the previous market building built in neoclassical style, the ground floor houses the market itself, which has a capacity of 360 stalls, while a 100-slot parking garage occupies the second floor. Among the new amenities built into the new building are separate sections for dry and wet goods, air-conditioned restrooms equipped with bidet showers and stainless steel fixtures, a food court, a closed-circuit television system and free public Wi-Fi. The building also has provisions for enclosed standalone establishments, with the Quinta Market branch of Jollibee opening on December 4, 2017.

On December 8, 2017, the city government opened the market's new vegetable section, selling vegetables brought straight from farms in Benguet. Inaugurated by Estrada along with Benguet governor Crecenscio Pacalso, the section ultimately aims to bring down the cost of vegetables sold in the city.

Incorporated into the structure's rear is a fish port, which would allow the market to directly receive fresh seafood from Navotas and produce from other parts of the country, as well as a ferry terminal. Constructed with the assistance of the Philippine Ports Authority, the ferry terminal's construction is expected to help decongest Quezon Boulevard and surrounding roads with the impending revival of the Pasig River Ferry Service.

Although Quinta Market is owned by the City of Manila, it is run by Marketlife under the terms of their joint venture agreement. In exchange for running the market for 25 years, the market's revenues are split between the two, with Marketlife keeping 80 percent of revenues and the remaining 20 percent remitted to the city government. Revenues are primarily generated through stall rental fees, with the original rental fee being ₱15–30 per square meter per day. On September 4, 2017, despite promising not to do so, the city government increased rental fees to between ₱30 and ₱80 per square meter depending on stall size. The increases in rental fees were criticized by vendors as being too high, although the city defended the increases by justifying that the increases were modest compared to what Marketlife actually wanted, with the company asking for rental rates as much as 300 percent higher, or as high as ₱67.25 per square meter.

== Vendors and stalls ==
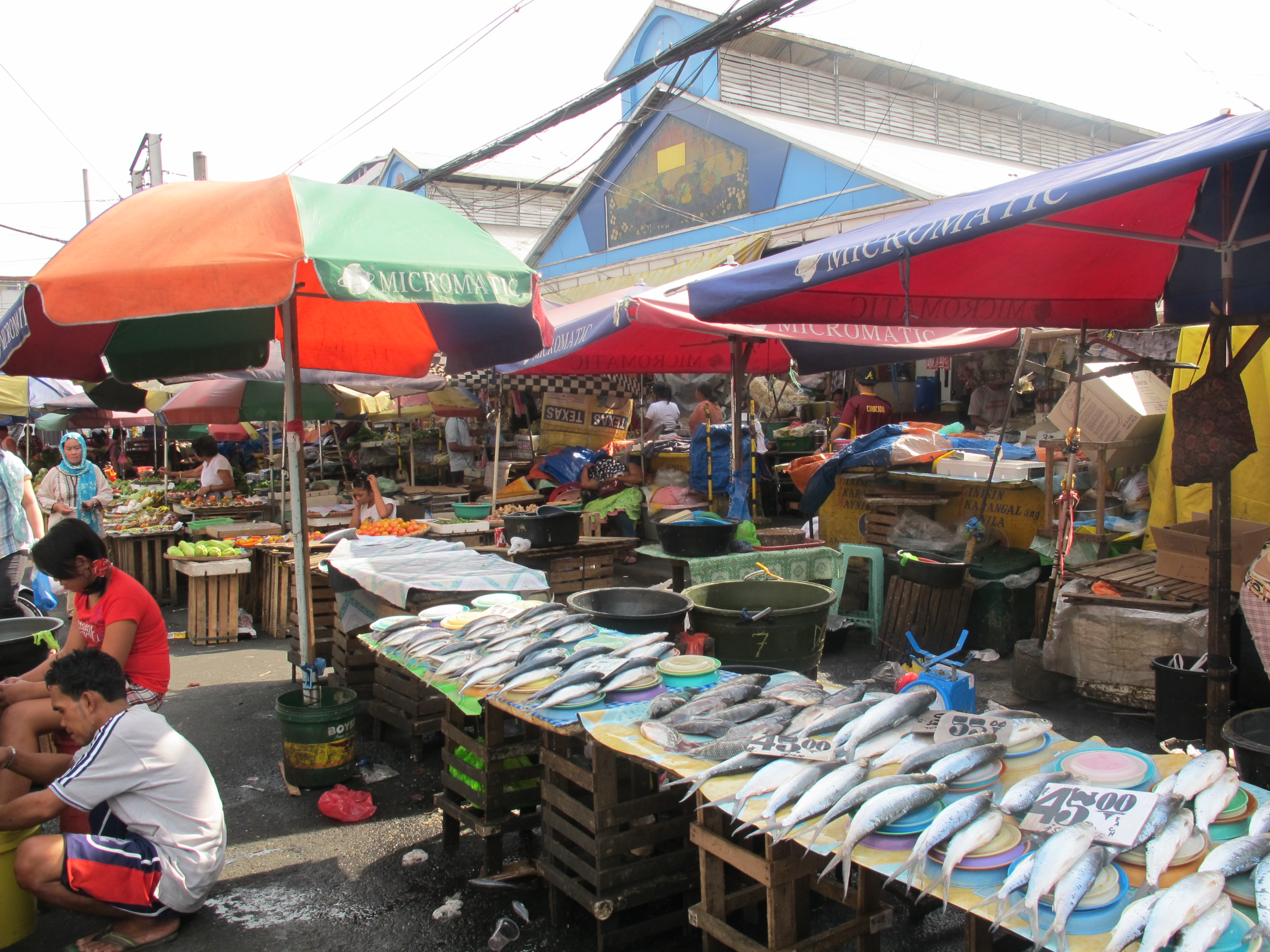
Informal street vendors in front of the old Quinta Market in 2011. In 2017, hundreds of these vendors were cleared from the market by the Manila city government.

At its reopening in 2017, Quinta Market was home to 279 registered vendors, all of whom were also registered vendors at the old market at the time it was torn down. Their interests are represented by the Quinta Public Market Development Cooperative (QPMDC), also known as the Quinta Stallholders Association.

Scandal arose in August 2017 when an organization called the United Vendors Alliance (UVA) alleged that a business mafia was monopolizing trade at the market, protected by officials in the city government. According to the allegations, 26 families reportedly owned 146 stalls which were turned over to other vendors after paying the syndicate additional fees, despite the city's Market Code mandating that a family can only own one stall at a time. They also alleged that the 26 families were not even resident in the City of Manila, and that their arrangement prevented other vendors from getting places in the market, thus forcing them to sell on the street. A member of the Manila City Council named by the UVA as a protector of the mafia strongly denied the allegations, while the QPDMC denied that there even was a mafia operating in the market to begin with, going so far as claiming that the UVA's president wasn't even a registered vendor there. Estrada, for his part, promised to investigate the matter.

Informal vendors often congregate around Quinta Market, with vendors occupying as much as half of Carlos Palanca Street, in the process causing heavy traffic. In September 2017, the Manila city government undertook a series of cleanup operations that led to the departure of hundreds of informal vendors from the market's perimeter.

=== Notable establishments and patrons ===
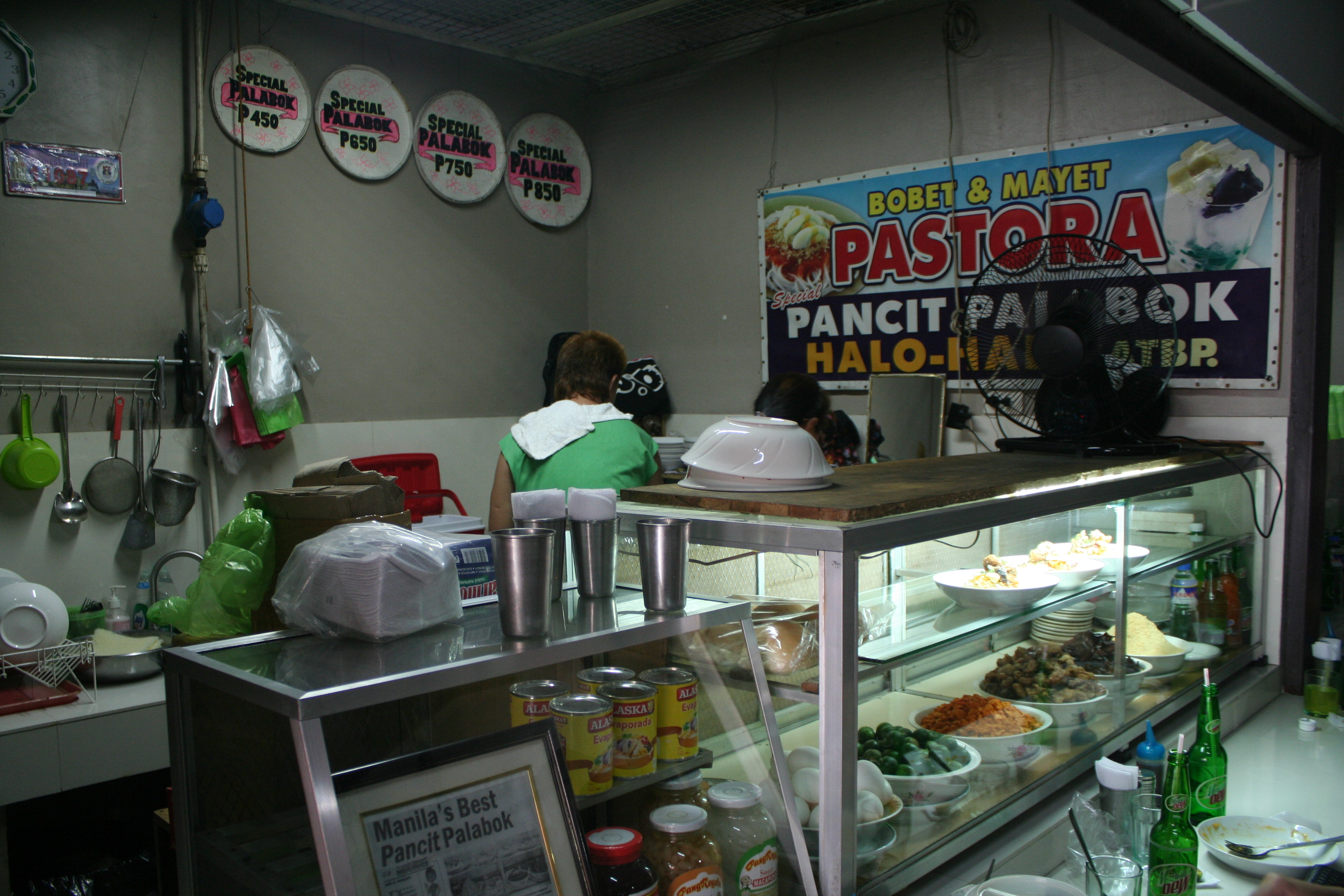
Pastora Special Palabok, identified by the Manila Bulletin in 2014 as having the best pancit palabok in Manila.

As a commercial hub, Quinta Market is strongly connected with Filipino cuisine and the Manila food culture. In its heyday, the market was seen as a pleasant place to dine at, and shoppers would patronize the many carinderias (food stalls) inside, known for their pancit, menudo, puto and dinuguan. The market is also known for its halo-halo, and it is believed that the dessert was invented here as an innovation on the Japanese mitsumame in the 1920s or 1930s. Some of the carinderias have become notable in their own right: in 2014, the Manila Bulletin identified Pastora Special Palabok as having the best pancit palabok in Manila, while Edna's Eatery, known for its nilagang baka, was featured on the GMA Network morning show Unang Hirit.

Quinta Market has also been linked to the origins of a number of Philippine culinary and cultural personalities. R. Lapid's, the Philippines' largest chicharon chain, first started selling their signature product at the family meat stall of the chain's founder inside the market, while the father of radio host Ruel "Ahwel" Paz was also a vendor at the market in the 1980s. Restaurateur Engracia Cruz-Reyes, founder of Filipino restaurant The Aristocrat, regularly visited the market, as did her daughter Teresita, who became known for the Mama Sita's line of food products. Other regular visitors to the market included restaurateurs Anastacio de Alba, former cook of the Casino Español de Manila and founder of Spanish restaurants Alba and El Español, and Nenuca Benitez, founder of the Filipino-Spanish restaurant Mario's in Baguio.

The area around Quinta Market is likewise home to several stores and stalls selling everything from furniture to clothing. Beside the market is the shopping area known as "Ilalim ng Tulay" ("under the bridge"), so called because of its location underneath the Quezon Bridge. Known for its very cheap prices, the stores here sell mostly wood products, furniture and Philippine handicrafts sourced from all over the country, as well as souvenirs for tourists. College students who purchase items from this area often call the place "Ils de Tuls" or "Ile de Toule", francisizing the name to make their purchases sound more sophisticated, although the name has since become mainstream among those who frequent the area. Facing the market along Carlos Palanca Street meanwhile are stores selling costumes and props.

== References and bibliography ==
=== Bibliography ===
- Ira, Luming B.; Medina, Isagani R.; Ricio, Nik (1983). Streets of Manila. Quezon City: GCF Books. ISBN 971-538-196-0.
- Camagay, Maria Luisa T. (1992). Kasaysayang Panlipunan ng Maynila, 1765–1898 [Social History of Manila, 1765–1898] (in Filipino). Quezon City: University of the Philippines Press.
- Ramírez Martín, Susana María (2006). El terremoto de Manila de 1863: medidas políticas y económicas [The 1863 Manila earthquake: political and economic aspects] (in Spanish). Madrid: Spanish National Research Council. ISBN 84-00-08430-6 – via Google Books.
- Doeppers, Daniel F. (2016). Feeding Manila in Peace and War, 1850–1945. Madison: University of Wisconsin Press. ISBN 9780299305109 – via Google Books.
