= Isetann =

Philippine retail company

- Type: Private
- Industry: Retail
- Founded: 1979; 47 years ago (as Joymart); July 27, 1980; 46 years ago (as Isetann); Carriedo Street, Sta. Cruz, Manila, Metro Manila
- Headquarters: Isetann Cinerama Recto, C.M. Recto Ave. corner Quezon Boulevard and Evangelista St., Quiapo, Manila, Philippines (previously until 1988, Carriedo)
- Number of locations: 5 branches (as of January 2016)
- Area served: Metro Manila
- Key people: Jorge Go (co-founder and Chairman); John Gobenghuy (co-founder and CEO)
- Owner: Joymart Consolidated Corp.
- Website: isetann.com.ph facebook.com/Isetann

Isetann Department Store, Inc. under the trade name Isetann Department Store and Supermarket (or simply Isetann) is one of the retail operators in Metro Manila, the Philippines. It was incorporated in 1980 by Chinese-Filipino entrepreneurs Jorge Go and John Gobenghuy to operate Isetann commercial shopping centers such as the lease of commercial spaces within the compound of their malls and department stores. Isetann has about 2,000 employees. It has five branches.

== History ==
The roots of Isetann Department Store Inc. dates back on July 27, 1980 It was established in Carriedo, the former business district of Manila. Isetann was the revived version of 'Joymart' which was a smaller local supermarket chain, could not benefit much from economies of scale. Hence, 'Joymart' was renamed the now 'Isetann' which transformed into a modern large-scale retailer store, with bright signature colors of orange and green. The first and only Isetann Mall, Isetann Cinerama Recto, was opened in 1988 as Isetann's response to its rival mall SM North EDSA (opened 3 years earlier) located at the portion of Estero de Quiapo before becoming the site of the former Roman Super Cinerama which was burned down in the late 1970s. It primarily specializes in international and local movie screenings. The largest of the four branches, the Recto mall attracts shopping traffic because of its location beside Line 1 and Line 2 train stations in the office district of Manila.

During the rest of the 1980s, Isetann expands its business in Cubao, Quezon City in mid-1985. In April 1988 in Recto, Manila to become a fully functioning department store and supermarket. In July 1989 Sta. Mesa, Manila a wholesale store outlet was developed. Unlike the first 3 branches, the Sta. Mesa branch is only a supermarket sans Department Store.

Isetann is known for its marketing promotions, such as celebrity events, cooking competitions, hip-hop dance contests, and beauty pageants. Celebrities who have appeared in Isetann include Marian Rivera, Xian Lim, Matteo Guidicelli, Sam Milby, and other well known local Filipino actors or singers. Besides celebrity promotions, the retailer also hosts sales, lotteries, and buy-one-take-one promotions.

In October 2019, the Isetann Recto was temporarily closed after a memorandum order by the city government of Manila due to "operating beyond its business permit", "misrepresentation of actual business area" and "questionable number of employees," according to the city's Bureau of Permits. The mall has since reopened after compliance to regulations.

== Branches ==
Name	Location
Isetann Carriedo	Carriedo Street, Quiapo, Manila
Isetann Cinerama Recto	Recto Avenue corner Quezon Boulevard, Quiapo, Manila
Isetann Cubao	Araneta City, Quezon City
Isetann Wholesale Store	Magsaysay Boulevard, Manila
