= Isetann Cinerama Recto =

Isetann
- Aerial view of Isetann Cinerama Recto (2026)
- Location: Manila, Philippines
- Address: C.M. Recto Avenue corner Quezon Boulevard and Evangelista Street, Quiapo
- Opened: April 1988; 38 years ago
- Developer: Isetann Department Store
- Manager: Isetann Department Store
- Owner: Joymart Consolidated Corp.
- Num. of stores: 100
- Num. of anchor tenants: 2
- Floor area: 20,000 m^{2} (220,000 sq ft)
- Floors: 6
- Public transit: Recto; Doroteo Jose; 10 Recto
- Website: Isetann Department Store

Isetann (also known as Isetann Cinerama Complex and Isetann Recto) is a shopping mall located at C.M. Recto Avenue corner Quezon Boulevard and Evangelista Street in Quiapo, Manila, Philippines. The mall sits in the portion of Estero de Quiapo which became Roman Super Cinerama in 1964 and burnt down in the late 1970s.

After the fire, the Roman and Rojas families sold their burnt theater to Isetann. The mall opened in April 1988; Isetann resurrected the Cinerama name after the mall was built. It also serves as the headquarters for Isetann since 1988 after vacating its previous headquarters in Carriedo which remained operational as an outlet.

== History ==
=== As Roman Super Cinerama ===
The mall began its roots in 1964 as Roman Super Cinerama, built in the portion of Estero de Quiapo. The theater is owned by the Roman and Rojas families, specifically Jose A. Rojas, son of Victor S. Rojas. It was at that time the most luxurious theater; it was the first building in the Philippines to have an escalator and the first carpeted cinema. It was also the biggest wide screen theater in the world with a seating capacity of 1,500. In the late 1970s the theater burned down due to a faulty wiring.

=== As Isetann Cinerama ===
In 1981, the Roman and Rojas families demolished the theater and sold the lot to Isetann in 1985 to develop a shopping mall in response to rival The SM Center North EDSA (now SM North EDSA), which was built in the same year as the first SM Supermall. However, the construction was delayed due to a series of massive protests in the area and the People Power Revolution, which led to Ferdinand Marcos's ouster from the office and installation of Corazon Aquino as president. Construction of the mall finally started in 1986 for completion by September 1987.

But on January 22, 1987, the Mendiola massacre occurred, killing 13 people, resulting in another major delay to the mall's opening. The opening date was moved from September 1987 to April 1988. Construction resumed a week after and topped off in mid-1987. It was finished in December 1987 and was officially opened in April 1988. In 1994, a six-year-old Sarah Geronimo did a short concert at the mall.

=== 2019: Closure and reopening ===
On October 9, 2019, Manila Mayor Isko Moreno announced the closure of the mall due to the "misrepresentation of actual business area" and "questionable number of employees," according to a memorandum from the city's Bureau of Permits. The mall's shopping center was registered under Tri-Union Properties, which has been leasing multiple stalls and spaces without any business permit. Isetann has four movie theaters managed by Cineworld Cinerama Inc. but holds a permit for only one cinema.

Trans-Orient Management Services Inc, the current management for the mall, has no valid and existing business permit. The mayor also noted that it was also misrepresenting its actual business area since only 1,000 square meters (11,000 sq ft) was declared and occupied. Isetann's property management is also willing to heed the government's directive to ban the sale of second-hand mobile phones, the statement read.

Before the actual closure, Moreno had banned the sale of secondhand cellphones in the city two days prior. He also issued another closure threat to the mall if proven it is coddling those who sell stolen mobile phones. According to the mayor, those who sell and buy stolen items can be charged with the Anti-Fencing Law (Presidential Decree No. 1612).

As of October 11, 2019, the mall reopened once again as it settled a ₱2,000,000.00 tax deficiency and secured proper business permits at the city hall. The mall owed the local government ₱4-million in unpaid taxes, but the amount was reduced because the company is covered by Manila's tax amnesty program. Under the policy penalties will be waived upon full payment of the principal amount of the basic tax. In compliance to the mayor's recent regulations, the sale of secondhand phones will no longer be allowed.
