= Betty Ang =

Filipina businesswoman

- Education: Assumption College
- Occupation: Businesswoman
- Known for: President of Monde Nissin
- Board member of: Suntrak Corporation
- Spouse: Hoediono Kweefanus
- Children: 6

Betty T. Ang is a Filipina businesswoman. She is the president of Monde Nissin, one of the largest food manufacturers in the Philippines, and the country's leading producer of biscuits and noodles. Monde Nissin is owned by her husband's family, who also owns PT Khong Guan Biscuit Indonesia. In August 2017, their net worth was estimated at US$880 million.

Ang, a business graduate of Assumption College, is married to Hoediono Kweefanus, a Chinese Indonesian who is also the vice-chairman of Monde Nissin. They have six children.
