= Monde Nissin =

Philippine multinational food and beverage company

Monde Nissin Corporation
- Trade name: Monde Nissin
- Formerly: Monde Denmark Nissin Biscuit Corporation (1979–1999)
- Type: Private (1979–2021); Public (since 2021)
- Traded as: PSE: MONDE
- Industry: Food; Beverage
- Founded: January 23, 1979; 47 years ago
- Founder: Hidayat Darmono
- Headquarters: Felix Reyes St., Brgy. Balibago, Santa Rosa, Laguna, Philippines
- Area served: Worldwide
- Key people: Hartono Kweefanus (Chairman Emeritus); Kataline Darmono (Chairperson of the Board); Betty Ang (President); Henry Soesanto (CEO, Executive Vice President and Director)
- Products: Instant noodles; Breakfast cereals; Biscuits; Crackers; Cookies; Wafers; Snack foods; Confectionery; Cakes; Breads; Condiments; Dairy products; Energy drinks; Beverages
- Revenue: ▲ ₱75.90 billion (2023)
- Operating income: ▲ ₱152.91 billion (2023)
- Net income: ▼ ₱−13.78 billion (2022)
- Total assets: ▲ ₱82.46 billion (2023)
- Total equity: ▲ ₱8.51 billion (2023)
- Number of employees: 3,500 (2023)
- Divisions: Monde Nissin International
- Subsidiaries: Marlow Foods Limited; Menora Foods; Monde Nissin Australia Pty. Ltd.; Monde Nissin New Zealand Ltd.; Monde Nissin Singapore Pte. Ltd.; Monde Nissin Thailand Co., Ltd.; Monde M.Y. San Corporation; Monde Malee Beverages Corporation; Poseidon Tarama; Sarimonde Foods Corporation
- Website: mondenissin.com

Monde Nissin Corporation, commonly known as Monde Nissin or abbreviated as MNC, is a Philippine multinational food and beverage company with a portfolio of brands across instant noodles, biscuits, baked goods, culinary aids and alternative meat products categories, including Lucky Me!, SkyFlakes, Fita, M.Y. San Grahams and Nissin. Monde Nissin also sells its alternative meat products globally under Quorn Foods and the Quorn brand.

Since 2000, Monde Nissin has been consistently included in the top 50 corporations in the Philippines on gross revenues.

On March 4, 2021, Monde Nissin filed for registration application with the Philippine Securities and Exchange Commission for an initial public offering of its common shares. The company also has a satellite office along Ayala Avenue in Makati.

== History ==
The company was founded as Monde Denmark Nissin Biscuit Corporation on May 23, 1979, by Hidayat Darmono, patriarch of the Kweefanus family. Its first products were Nissin Butter Coconut and Nissin Wafer. Several cookies and snack products were also launched a few years later, namely Eggnog Cookies, Bread Stix, and Bingo Cookie Sandwich.

In 1989, MDNBC expanded into another segment and launched Lucky Me noodles in beef and chicken variants.

On March 17, 1999, Monde Denmark Nissin Biscuit Corporation was changed its name to Monde Nissin Corporation based on the SEC regulatory filing.

In 2015, Monde Nissin acquired Quorn for £550 million, in what was the third largest overseas purchase by a firm in the Southeast Asian nation at the time of the transaction. In 2019, Monde Nissin also invested in NAMZ Pte. Ltd., a food science company in Singapore that redesigns food, beverage, and personal care products.

By 2020, according to Nielsen, Monde Nissin ranked first in retail sales value in the Philippines in instant noodles and biscuits, as well as oyster sauce and yogurt drinks. In 2020, Monde Nissin's instant noodles, biscuits, yogurt drinks and oyster sauce constituted 68%, 30.5%, 73.2% and 56% of retail sales market share in the Philippines, respectively.

Flagship brands contributing to this market leading position included Lucky Me! for instant noodles, SkyFlakes, Fita, Nissin and M.Y. San Grahams for biscuits, Mama Sita's for culinary aids and Dutch Mill for yogurt drinks. By 2020, Quorn Foods also became the market leader in the meat alternatives market in the U.K. with Quorn being the number 1 brand with 28% grocery retail market share by value in 2020, as set out in the OC&C report.

On June 1, 2021, Monde Nissin Corporation was inaugurated as a listing on the Philippine Stock Exchange.

=== Leadership in the instant noodles segment ===
In 1989, Monde Nissin ventured into the instant noodles segment with launch of Lucky Me!. It also launched Lucky Me! Instant Mami, noodles with soup in pouches, in Beef and Chicken variants.

The launch of Lucky Me! Pancit Canton, in 1991 the first dry stir-fry pouched noodles in the Philippine market also created a brand new category worth over ₱10 billion in 2020. In 1995, Lucky Me! Supreme in La Paz Batchoy flavor was launched as the first Filipino dish-flavored no-cook cup noodles.

In 2003, Monde Nissin launched Pista Pancit Ulam, with Bayani Agbayani as its endorser.

In 2009, Lucky Me! Special was introduced, which consists of noodles with local and international flavors such as Lomi (egg noodles in seafood flavor), Jjamppong (spicy Korean noodles), Curly Spaghetti, Baked Mac, and Mac & Cheez.

In 2014, Kantar Worldpanel, in its Brand Footprint Report, cited Lucky Me! as the most chosen and purchased consumer brand in the Philippines, reaching almost all Filipino households.

=== Growth of the biscuit segment ===
In 2001, the company acquired M.Y. San Biscuit, Inc., manufacturer of SkyFlakes, Fita, and M.Y. San Grahams. After the acquisition by Monde Nissin, M.Y. San Biscuit, Inc. changed its name to Monde M.Y. San Corporation.

In 2005, Voice Combo Sandwich was launched as the first cracker and wafer combo biscuit in the Philippines.

In 2014, Voice Pops was launched as the first cream sandwich with popping candies.

=== Expansion of product portfolio ===
In 2006, Monde Nissin entered into distribution agreements with Dutch Mill Co. Ltd. and Dairy Plus Thailand, respectively, under which Monde Nissin became the exclusive distributor of Dutch Mill cultured milk and yogurt products, respectively, in the Philippines. In 2010, Monde Nissin expanded its partnership with Dutch Mill Co. Ltd. to include marketing by Monde Nissin of Dutch Mill products. In 2016, Monde Nissin formed a partnership with Dutch Mill Co., Ltd. for the distribution of Dutch Mill cultured milk.

Additionally in 2010, Monde Nissin entered the culinary solutions market with the introduction of Lucky Me! NamNam All-3-in-1 Seasoning. Its portfolio of culinary aids expanded further with the launch of Lucky Me! NamNam Tomato seasoning in 2013, the first seasoning in the local market with the taste of real tomatoes.

In August 2011, Monde was launched as the first premium-quality packaged baked products line. It initially offered Monde Special Mamon, the first premium-quality baked sponge cake in the Philippines. This was followed by the introduction of Monde Special Cream Puff, Belgian Waffle, and Crispy Waffle.

In 2014, Monde Nissin also became exclusive marketing and distribution arm of Sandpiper Spices and Condiments Corp. for Mama Sita's products, such as sauces, mixes, condiments, meal kits, and coolers.

Monde Nissin continued to expand by entering into a joint venture deal in 2016 with Nippon Indosari, Indonesia's largest bread products producer, to create Sarimonde Foods Corporation, which started its operations in the Philippines in 2017.

Monde Nissin also formed a joint venture called Monde Malee Beverages Corporation in 2017 with Malee Beverage Public Co. Ltd., a leading juice and canned fruit manufacturer in Thailand, and became the exclusive distributor of Malee branded beverage products in the Philippines.

=== Subsidiaries and partnerships ===
Apart from developing homegrown brands, Monde Nissin led acquisitions and forged business partnerships, leading to the diversification of its product lines and extended reach in the international market.

Philippines

In 2001, M.Y. San Biscuit, Inc. was acquired by Monde Nissin and renamed Monde M.Y. San Corporation.

In 2014, the company became the exclusive marketing and distribution arm of Marigold Manufacturing Corporation for Mama Sita's products.

In January 2023, the company acquired a 15% stake in The Figaro Coffee Group, parent company of Figaro Coffee, Angel's Pizza and Tien Ma Taiwanese restaurant. The investment marks the company's entry into the foodservice sector.

Thailand

In 2004, Monde Nissin began its expansion in the international manufacturing market through the establishment of another subsidiary, Monde Nissin Thailand.

In 2006, Monde Nissin partnered with Dairy Plus Thailand to distribute Dutch Mill Yoghurt Drink to the Philippines. Four years later, the company took over the local marketing of the brand.

Australia

In 2015, Monde Nissin acquired Menora Foods, a family-owned Australian food company, its third acquisition in Australia, having previously acquired the Black Swan and Nudie Juice brands.

United Kingdom

In 2015, it bought Quorn for £550m. Quorn Foods is the market leader in the meat alternatives market in the United Kingdom.

Indonesia

Monde Nissin formed a joint venture with Nippon Indosari, Indonesia's largest bread products maker, in 2016 to form Sarimonde Foods Corporation. According to the company, Sarimonde recently acquired Walter Bread, a Filipino brand known for its nutritious and creative bread products, as its first big step in the packaged bread industry. Its portfolio includes Walter Sugar-Free Bread and Walter Double Fiber Wheat Bread, both of which are industry firsts.

Japan

The company also announced a collaboration with Japanese retailer Uniqlo to launch men's and women's shirts featuring Monde Nissin brands such as Lucky Me!, the Philippines' leading instant noodles brand, and Bingo Cookie Sandwich, a popular snack among teenagers.

== Brands ==
Noodles:

- Lucky Me!
  - Go Cup (formerly Supreme) (cup noodles)
  - Instant Mami (noodles with soup in pouch)
  - Pancit Canton (dry noodles in pouch)
  - True to Taste (formerly Special) (special noodles in pouch)
  - NamNam All-3-in-1 Seasoning

Biscuits, Wafers, and Cookies:

- Nissin
  - Butter Coconut
  - Wafer
  - Stick Wafer
  - Cubee Wafer
  - Bread Stix
  - Eggnog
  - Waffle Deluxe
  - Bingo
  - Monde Tini Wini
  - Sumo
  - Malkist Sandwich
- M.Y. San
  - SkyFlakes
  - Fita
  - M.Y. San Grahams
  - Butter Cookies
  - Happy Time

Breads and Cakes:

- Monde
  - Special Mamon
  - Special Cream Puff
  - Choco Puff
  - Cheese Bar
  - Banana Bar
  - Fluffy Bread
  - Milk Bread
  - Wheat Bread
- Sari Roti
- Walter Bread
  - Sugar Free Wheat Bread
  - Sugar Free Wheat Pan de Sal
  - Double Fiber Wheat Bread
  - High Fiber Weight Control Bread
  - Whole Wheat Raisin Bread
  - Thick Slice Super Loaf

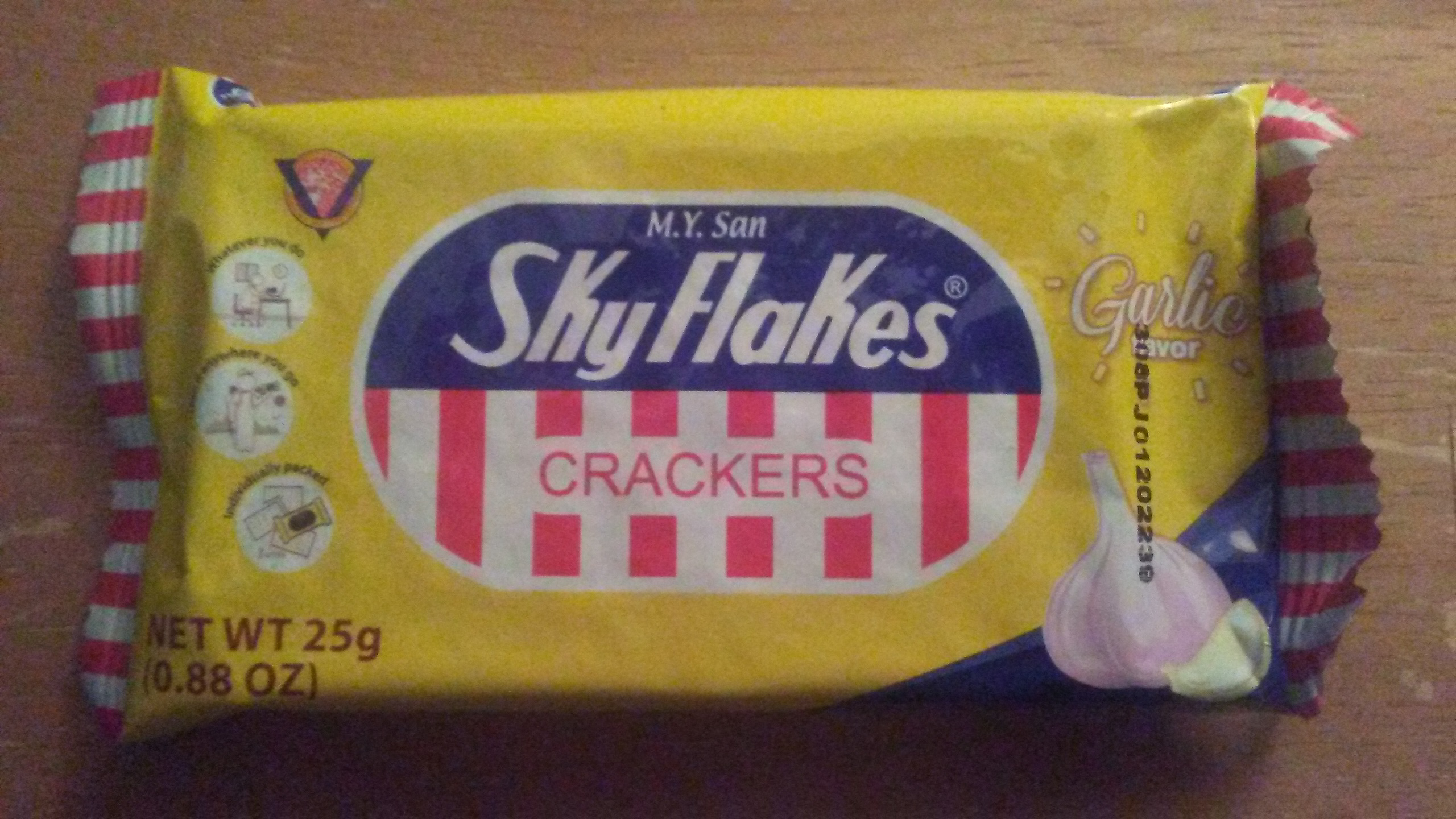
SkyFlakes Crackers in Garlic Flavor

Others:

- Black Swan
- Monde Nuvi
- Nudie Yoghurt
- Quorn
- Smoothie Bebe

Distribution:

- Mama Sita's (domestic distribution)
- GoodNom Fresh Gata
- Peckish Rice Crisps
- Dutch Mill Yogurt Drink
- Dutch Mill Delight
- Dutch Mill Soy Secretz
- Dutch Mill ProYo
- Kratos Iced Coffee
- Nudie Juice
- Jelly Vit Jelly Drink
- Nuvi Jelly Milk Drink

Former brands:

- Nissin Classic
- Hearty Flakes
- Hearty Rich-Flakes
- M.Y. San Animal Biscuits
- M.Y. San Wafers
- Solo
- Lucky Me! Supreme Mami
- Lucky Me! Supreme Pancit Canton
- Snitch Chocolate Bar in Choco Blast
- Snitch Chocolate Bar in Cookies n' Cream
- Snitch Chocolate Bar in Strawberry
- Voice
- Voice 2-in-1
- Kellogg's Cereals
- Monde Coco Bites
- Nissin Marie
- Nissin Dip-Dip
- Nissin Nuggets
- Kid-O Mini Sandwich
- Pringles Potato Chips
- One One Rice Snack (divested)

== Advocacy ==
In 2007, Monde Nissin, under Lucky Me!, launched Kainang Pamilya Mahalaga (Family Mealtime Matters) advocacy. It focuses on the promotion of frequent family meals together as a way to strengthen the foundations of the Filipino family. The advocacy was supported by Presidential Proclamation 326 dated January 2012, which declared every 4th Monday of September to be Kainang Pamilya Mahalaga day.

== Controversy ==
=== 2022 Lucky Me! Recalls ===
Health authorities in Malta, Ireland, France, and other countries have issued warnings for the consumptions of the export variants of different Lucky Me! instant noodles due to containing high amounts of Ethylene oxide. The Food and Drug Administration of the Philippines have investigated the matter. Monde Nissin also lost $350 million in market value due to the warnings with the stock sinking more than 10%. It was later confirmed that the contaminated batches of said products are those of the export versions (which are made in Thailand) and not the local versions (which are made in the Philippines). The local batches of Lucky Me! meet the EU acceptable level of 0.02 mg/kg or below.

=== Unprofitable meat alternative business ===
Business news website Bilyonaryo continues to report on the company's endeavor on meat alternative brand Quorn - derisively calling it "Fake meat [business]" and even continuously taunting the company such as when it was reported to have incurred total losses on such business line to PHP 40 billion as of early 2025.

== See also ==
- List of instant noodle brands
