= Dutch Mill =

Thai dairy company

Dutch Mill Co. Ltd.
- Type: Private
- Industry: Dairy products
- Founded: January 27, 1984; 42 years ago
- Headquarters: Bangkok, Thailand
- Area served: Worldwide
- Products: Yogurt; Milk; Soy milk
- Revenue: ▲24.9 billion THB (2022)
- Number of employees: 61 (2021)
- Website: www.dutchmill.co.th

Dutch Mill
- Product type: Yogurt drink
- Current owner: Dutch Mill Co., Ltd. (Monde Nissin in the Philippines)
- Country: Thailand
- Introduced: 1984; 42 years ago
- Markets: Worldwide

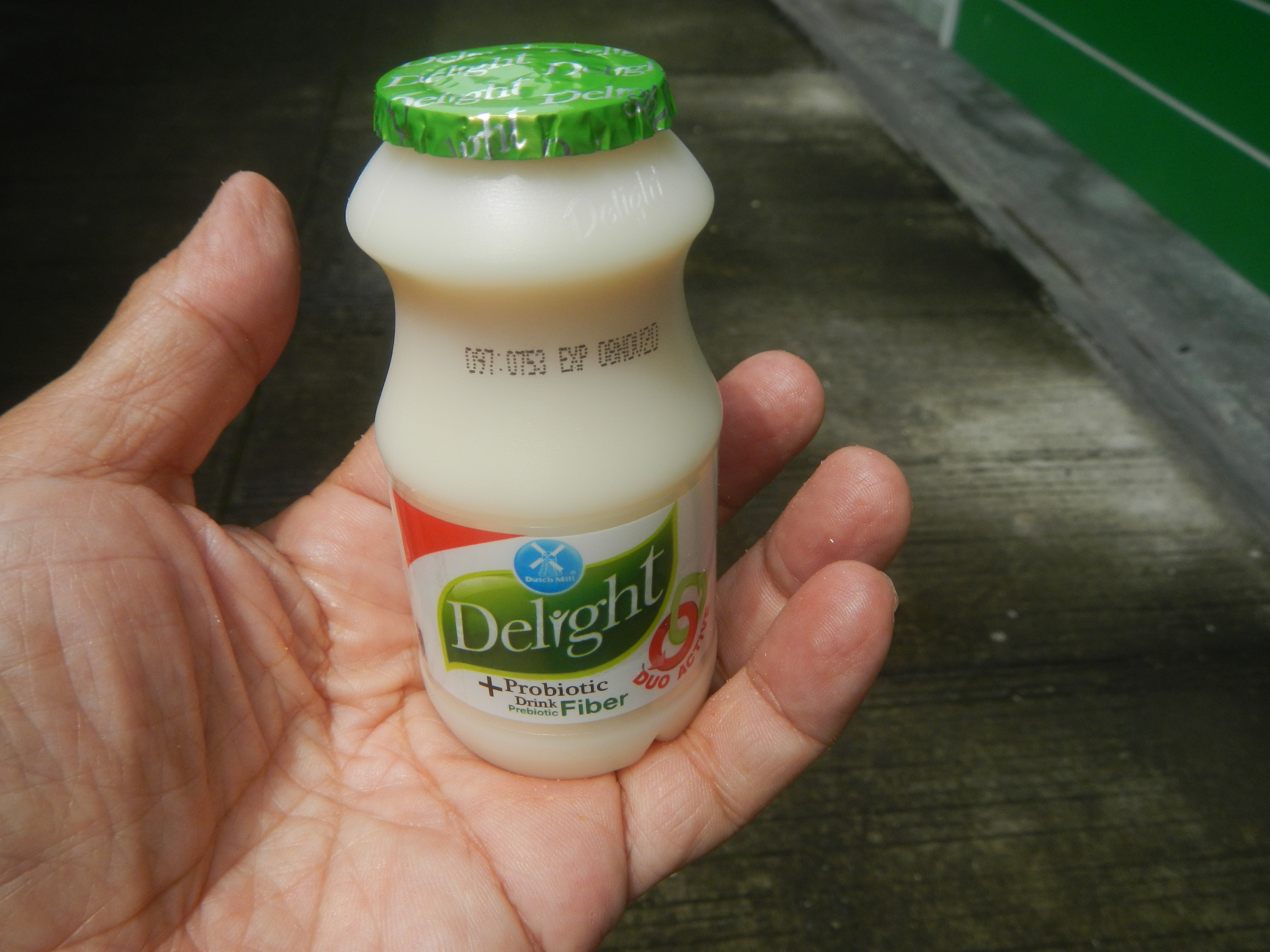

Dutch Mill Co., Ltd. is one of Thailand's largest manufacturers and marketers of dairy products. The company has such products as Dutch Mill UHT yoghurt drink, Dutch Mill fresh milk and Dutchie cup yoghurt. The company was established in 1984 under the name of Pro Food Co., Ltd. and was renamed Dutch Mill Co., Ltd. in 1991. Dutch Mill employs a total of 1,300 employees including 11 engineers and 10 quality assurance staff. Its primary market is ASEAN nations.

In the Philippines, Dutch Mill is currently owned by Monde Nissin Corporation.

== 2008 Chinese milk scandal ==
On 30 September 2008, Thailand began introducing restrictions on Chinese dairy products after discovering traces of melamine on two samples of imported Chinese milk powder. Thailand impounded about 60 tonnes of imported Chinese milk powder imported by Dutch Mill after making these discoveries. Dutch Mill stated they had to import milk from China because there was a shortage of supplies from New Zealand.

== See also ==
- 2008 Chinese milk scandal
