= Lucky Me (noodles) =

Brand of instant noodles in the Philippines

Lucky Me!
- Product type: Instant noodles
- Current owner: Monde Nissin
- Country: Philippines
- Introduced: November 1989; 37 years ago
- Markets: Worldwide
- Tagline: Happy We!
- Website: www.luckyme.ph

Lucky Me! is a Philippine instant noodle brand owned by Monde Nissin. It is currently the leading instant noodle brand in the Philippines, with a product line that includes pouch noodles, cup noodles, and various pasta products.

Kantar Worldpanel cited Lucky Me! in their 2014 Brand Footprint Report as the most chosen and purchased consumer brand in the Philippines, reaching almost all Filipino households.

On July 8, 2022, multiple countries in Europe as well as Taiwan issued health warnings regarding Lucky Me! products due to the reported presence of ethylene oxide, resulting in recalls in several countries. Monde Nissin denied the claims, stating that the products are FDA registered and comply with food safety standards. They explained that ethylene oxide is used only to inhibit microbial growth in spices, and trace amounts may remain after processing into seasonings and sauces. These trace amounts, the company claims, are compliant even within US Food and Drug Administration standards.

== See also ==
- List of instant noodle brands
- Filipino cuisine
