= Mama Sita's Holding Company =

Philippine condiment company

- Company type: Private
- Industry: Food processing
- Founded: 1980; 46 years ago (as Marigold Commodities Corporation)
- Headquarters: San Juan, Metro Manila, Philippines
- Area served: Worldwide
- Key people: Bartolome B. Lapus; Clara R. Lapus; Esmeraldo B. Lapus
- Products: Condiments, sauces
- Website: mamasitas.com?site=global%2F

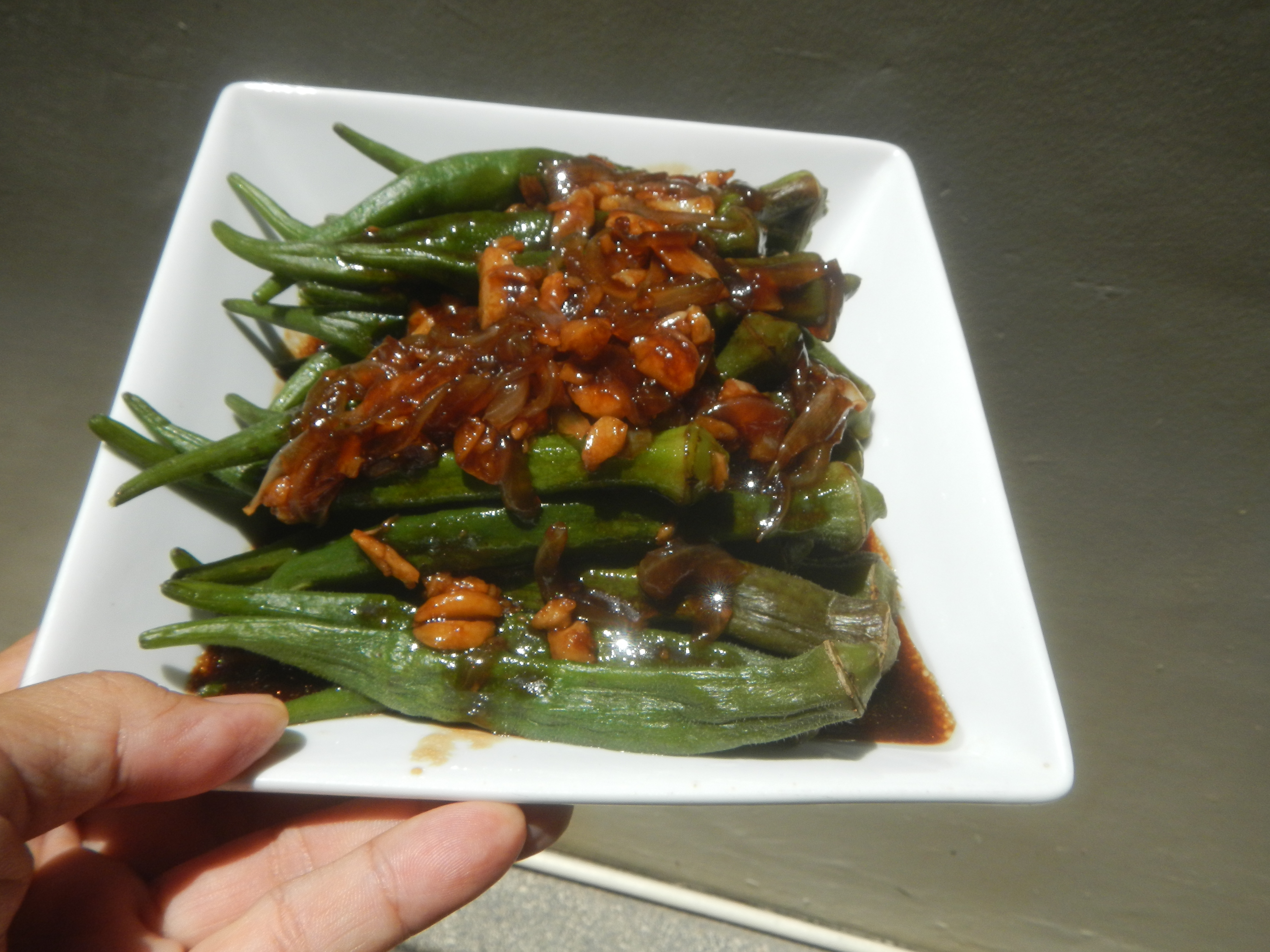
Stir-fried okra with Mama Sita's Oyster Sauce

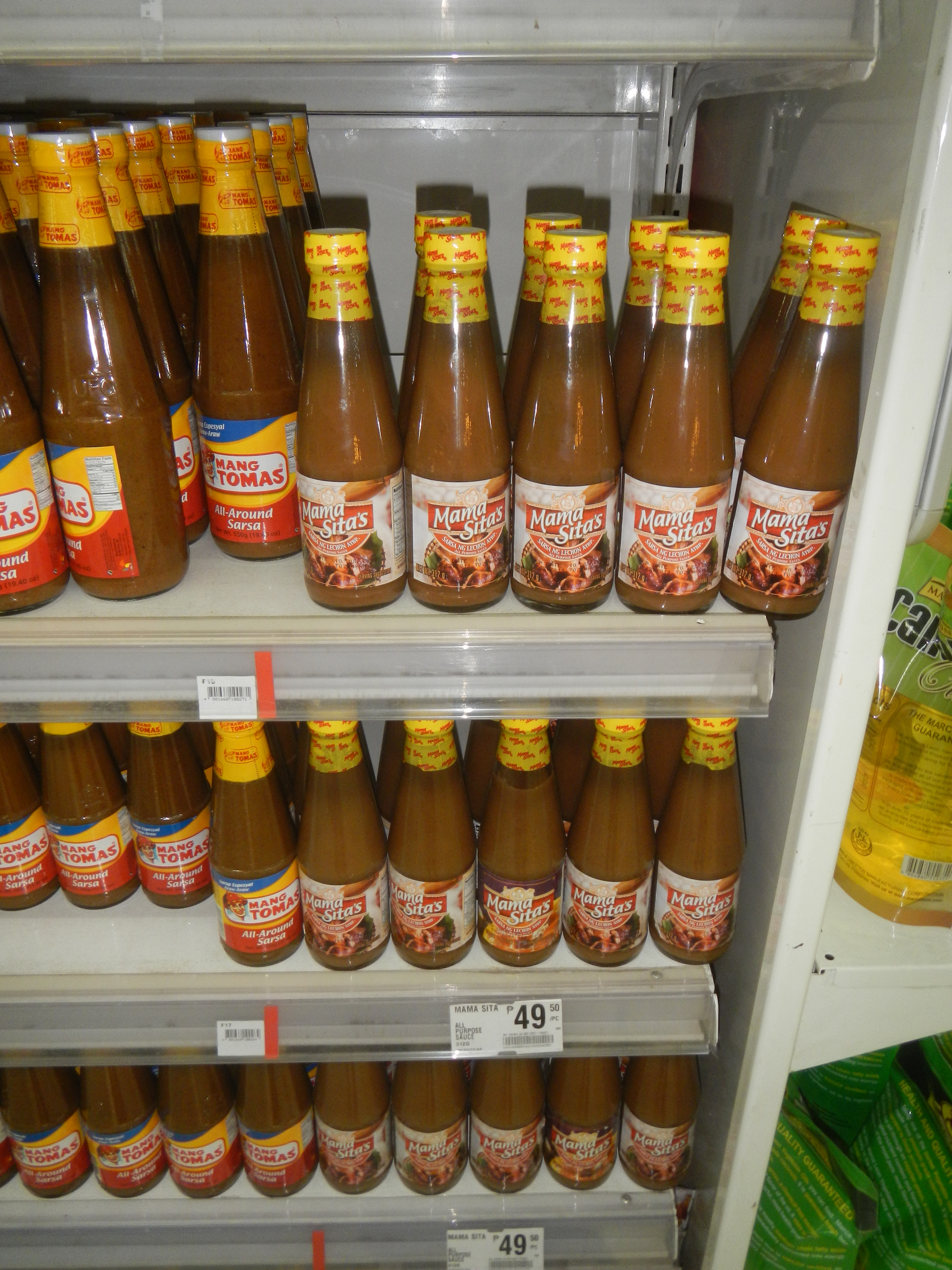
Mama Sita's products

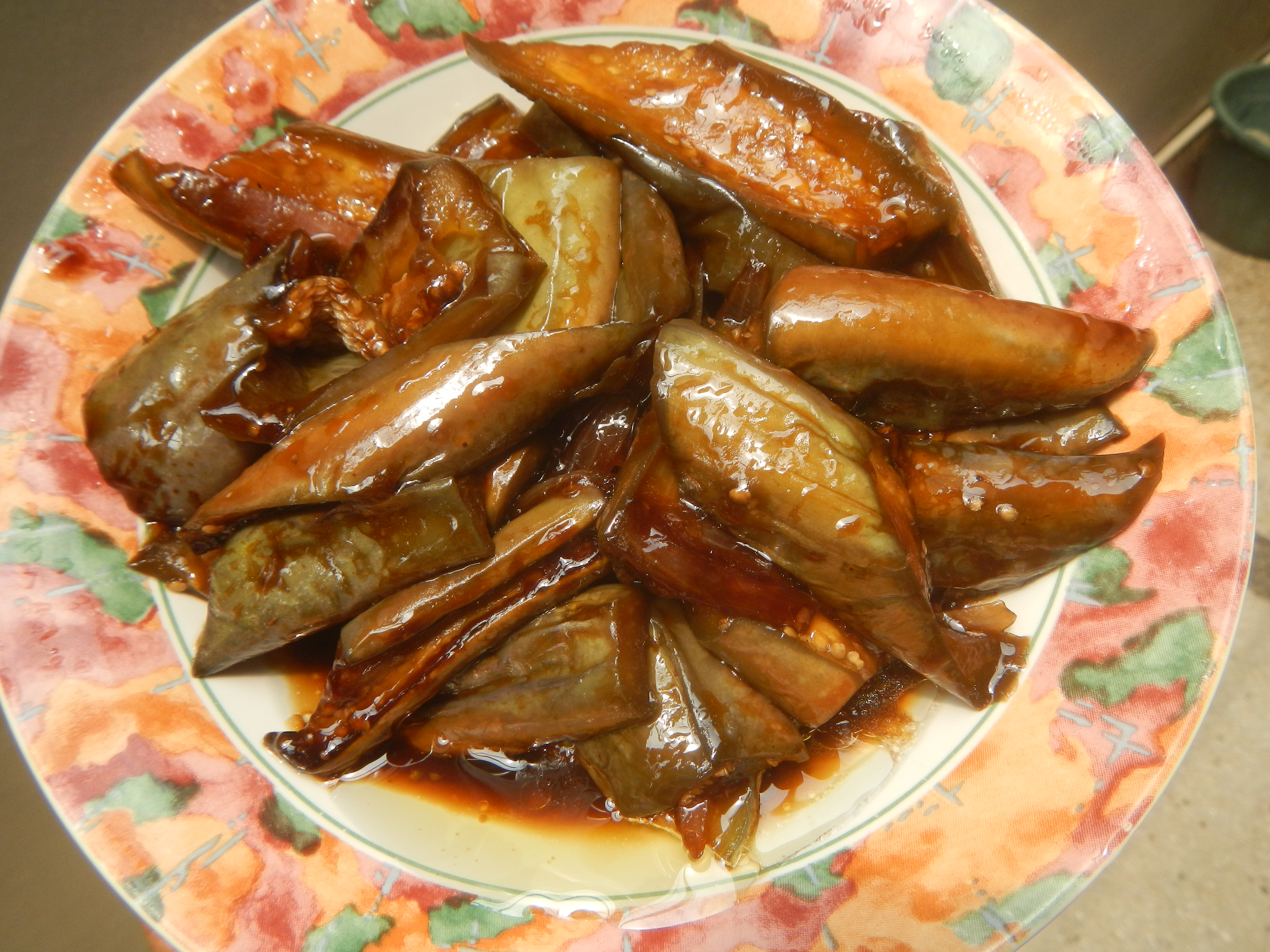
Stir-fried eggplant with Mama Sita's Oyster Sauce

Mama Sita's Holding Company, Inc. (founded as Marigold Commodities Corporation) is a Philippine-based manufacturer of condiments, selling its products under the brand, Mama Sita's. The brand is named after Teresita "Mama Sita" C. Reyes, matriarch of the company's founders, the spouses Bartolome B. Lapus and Clara C. Reyes-Lapus.

Mama Sita's products are available abroad in North America, Canada, Australia, New Zealand, and European countries. They are also distributed in Hong Kong, Singapore, Thailand, Malaysia, Japan, Korea, India and Pakistan. The Middle East is the biggest market with the Saudi Arabia, the United Arab Emirates, Kuwait, and Qatar as major consumers.

Since 2014, Mama Sita's is exclusively marketed and distributed by Monde Nissin Corporation.

== About Teresita Reyes ==
Teresita "Mama Sita" C. Reyes was born in Manila on May 11, 1917, the eldest child of Justice Alex Reyes and Engracia "Aling Asiang" Cruz-Reyes, founder of The Aristocrat Restaurant. She had an interest in Filipino food and raised a business devoted to creating recipes and selling sauce mixes, vinegars and sauces. Reyes and her company became well known in the Philippines and amongst Filipinos living abroad. In 2013, a 10 peso postage stamp was issued in honor of her memory by the Philippine government. At least two Mama Sita cookbooks have been produced, Mama Sita's Cookbook (1996) and Mama Sita's Homestyle Recipes (2010).

== Products ==
=== Liquid ===
- Mama Sita's Oyster Sauce
- Mama Sita's Garlic Oyster Sauce
- Mama Sita's Premium Soy Sauce
- Mama Sita's Mushroom Oyster Sauce
- Mama Sita's Liquid Seasoning
- Mama Sita's Java BBQ Sauce
- Mama Sita's Vegetarian Oyster Sauce
- Mama Sita's Sarsa ng Lechon Atbp.
- Mama Sita's Sarsa ng Lechon Atbp. (Hot)
- Mama Sita's Adobo Marinade
- Mama Sita's Barbecue Marinade
- Mama Sita's Fiesta Barbecue Marinade
- Mama Sita's Tapa Marinade
- Mama Sita's Bacolod Style Inasal
- Mama Sita's Pang-Inihaw
- Mama Sita's Ginger Spiced Paksiw Vinegar Mix

=== Mixes and sauces ===
- Mama Sita's Kare-Kare Mix
- Mama Sita's Caldereta Mix
- Mama Sita's Menudo/Afritada Mix
- Mama Sita's Adobo Mix
- Mama Sita's Sinigang na Sampalok Mix
- Mama Sita's Sinigang na Sampalok Mix (Hot)
- Mama Sita's Sinigang na Bayabas Mix
- Mama Sita's Pang-Gisa Mix
- Mama Sita's Chopsuey/Pancit Canton Stir Fry Mix
- Mama Sita's Pancit Bihon Mix
- Mama Sita's Barbecue Mix
- Mama Sita's Sweet & Sour Sauce Mix
- Mama Sita's Palabok Mix
- Mama Sita's Lumpiang Shanghai Mix
- Mama Sita's Tinola Mix
- Mama Sita's Ginisang Monggo Mix
- Mama Sita's Ilonggo Pinapaitan Mix
- Mama Sita's Tocino Mix
- Mama Sita's Kapampangan Sisig Mix
- Mama Sita's Breading Mix
- Mama Sita's Caldereta Sauce
- Mama Sita's Kare-Kare Mix
- Mama Sita's Menudo Sauce
- Mama Sita's Tomato Sauce
- Mama Sita's Kiddie Spaghetti
- Mama Sita's Achuete
- Mama Sita's Biglang Sinigang
- Mama Sita's Biglang Sinigang (Hot)
- Mama Sita's Cashew Vinegar
- Mama Sita's Distilled Cane Vinegar
- Mama Sita's Sukang Iloko
- Mama Sita's Anghang Sarap Spiced Tuba Vinegar
- Mama Sita's Coconut Nectar Vinegar
- Mama Sita's Sinamak
- Mama Sita's Sukang Tuba
- Mama Sita's Toyo't Kalamansi
- Mama Sita's Pinoy Anghang Hot Sauce
- Mama Sita's Hot Pepper Sauce
- Mama Sita's Buffalo Wings Sauce
- Mama Sita's Sweet Chili Sauce
- Mama Sita's Soy-Stir Sauce
- Mama Sita's Sweet & Sour Sauce
- Mama Sita's Arroz Caldo
- Mama Sita's Champorado

=== Flavors and juices ===
- Mama Sita's Samalamig Pandan
- Mama Sita's Samalamig Brown Cane Sugar
- Mama Sita's Samalamig Muscovado
