= Quezon Boulevard =

Road in Manila, Philippines

Coordinates: 14°36′11″N 120°59′5″E

R-8

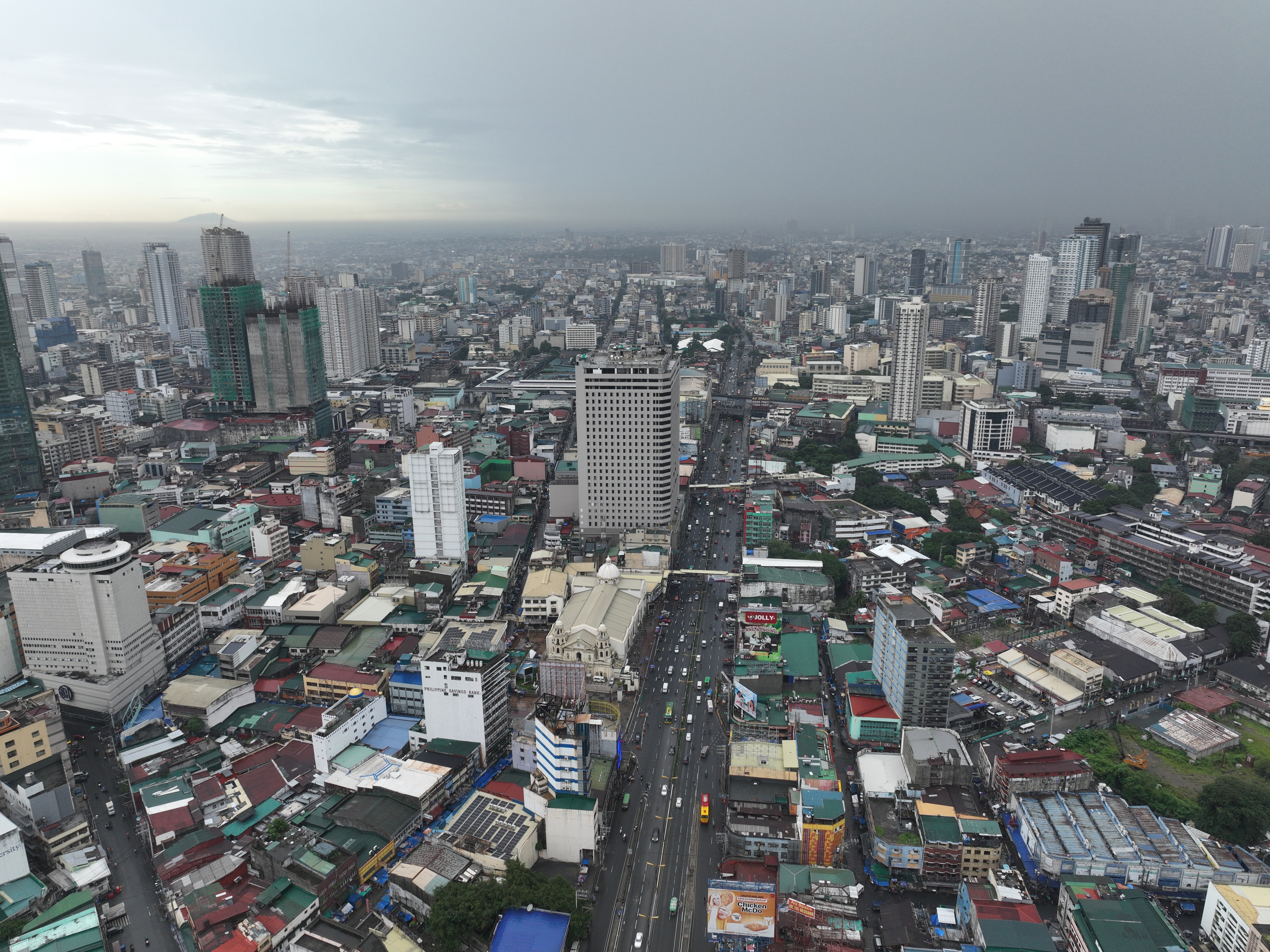
- Aerial view of Quezon Boulevard
- Interactive map of Quezon Boulevard
- Former names: Quezon Avenue (alternate, c. 1945)
- Part of: From Lerma to Quezon Bridge: R-8 R-8; N170
- Namesake: Manuel L. Quezon
- Maintained by: Department of Public Works and Highways - North Manila Engineering District Office
- Length: 1.1 km (0.68 mi)
- Location: Manila
- North end: N170 (Lerma Street) / Alfonso Mendoza Street in Sampaloc and Santa Cruz
- Major junctions: N145 (Recto Avenue)
- South end: Carlos Palanca Sr. Street in Quiapo

Quezon Boulevard is a short stretch of highway in Manila, Philippines, running north–south through the district of Quiapo. It is a six- to ten-lane 1.1-kilometer-long (0.68 mi) divided boulevard designated as a component of National Route 170 (N170) of the Philippine highway network, except for its service roads, and Radial Road 8 (R-8) of Manila's arterial road network, which links the center of Manila to North Luzon Expressway in Quezon City in the north. The boulevard is the main access to the popular Quiapo Church and is one of the main thoroughfares of the University Belt area. It is named after former Philippine President Manuel L. Quezon.

== History ==
The origin of the boulevard could be traced back to two parallel streets, Calle Santa Rosa and Calle Concepcion, that terminated at Estero de Curtidor (now part of Estero de Quiapo), as well as Calle P. Blanco and the old sections of Calle Norzagaray and Calle Globo de Oro at the south. In the early 1900s, Calle Santa Rosa and Calle Concepcion were renamed Calle Regidor (after La Solidaridad writer Antonio Maria Regidor) and Calle Martin Ocampo (after El Renacimiento and La Vanguardia editor Martin Ocampo), respectively. Calle Martin Ocampo was also known as Calle El Dorado circa 1920.

Quezon Boulevard was developed as part of a national road plan to connect the government center of Manila in Rizal Park to the proposed new capital on the Diliman estate in Quezon City. Named after the then-President of the Commonwealth, Manuel Luis Quezon, it was built in 1939 over Calle Regidor and the western portion of Calle Norzagaray, which were widened by demolishing all the buildings and houses on its east side and eventually combined with Calle Martin Ocampo, Calle P. Blanco, and a portion of Calle Globo de Oro. It was also in 1939 when the old Puente Colgante, which connected the boulevard south over the Pasig River to Padre Burgos Avenue in Ermita, was replaced by the modern steel arch bridge, Quezon Bridge. According to a 1945 map published by the United States Army Map Service, it was also known as Quezon Avenue. Its northern extension is now called España Boulevard and Quezon Avenue, respectively.

== Route description ==
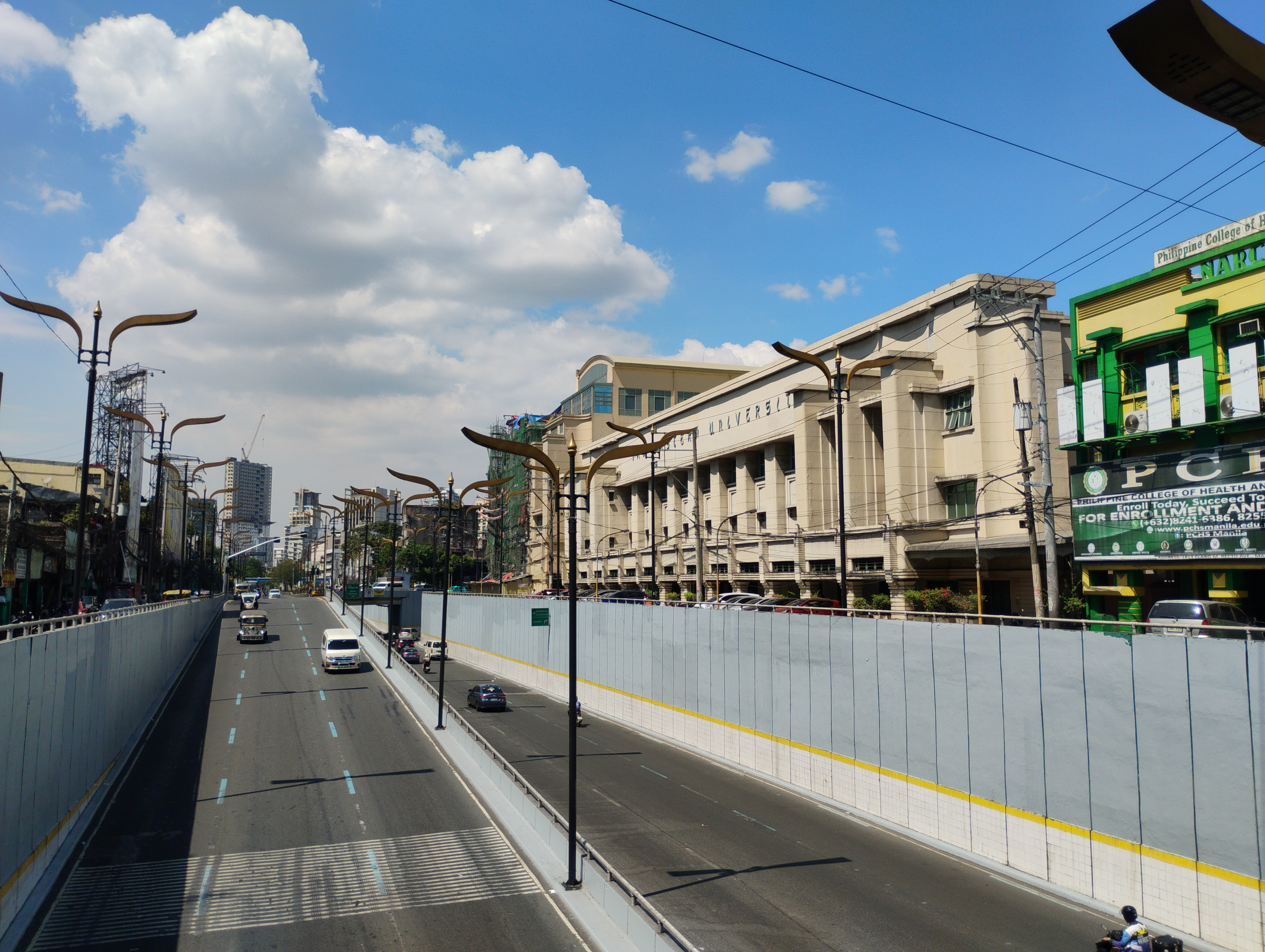
Quezon Boulevard north of Recto Avenue

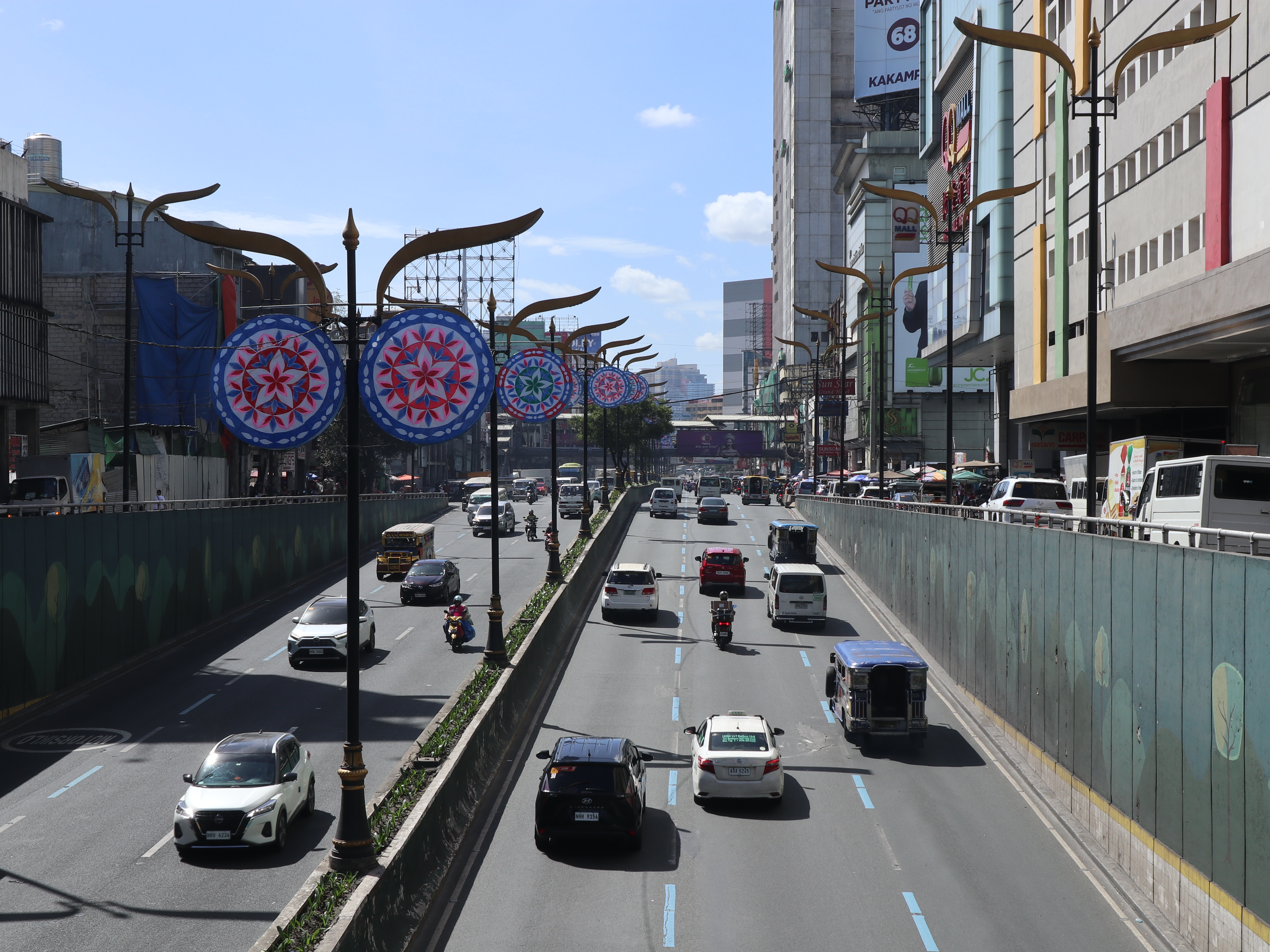
Quezon Boulevard south of Recto Avenue

Quezon Boulevard begins on Carlos Palanca Sr. Street (formerly Calle Echague) by the riverside Quinta Market as a continuation of Padre Burgos Avenue from Ermita and Intramuros from Quezon Bridge. It intersects with Arlegui Street, which leads to the San Miguel district and the Malacañang Palace complex, and Hidalgo Street (former Calle San Sebastian), which leads to San Sebastian Church, before arriving at Plaza Miranda and Quiapo Church, the site of the annual Feast of the Black Nazarene. The boulevard then runs into a junction with Gonzalo Puyat Street (former Calle Raon), which cuts through the commercial area of Quiapo towards Santa Cruz and heads for Sampaloc district at the intersection with Recto Avenue. It ends at the junction with Lerma Street, continuing as Alfonso Mendoza Street (formerly Calle Andalucía), which heads north to the San Lazaro Tourism and Business Park.

== Intersections ==
The entire route is located in Manila. Rizal Park is designated as kilometer zero.

km	mi	Destinations	Notes
		N170 (Lerma Street) / Alfonso Mendoza Street	Northern terminus; continues north as Alfonso Mendoza Street
		N145 (Recto Avenue)	Diamond interchange; no left turn towards Recto Avenue
3	1.9	Buenviaje Street	Northbound access only via service road to Recto Avenue
		Soler Extension	Northbound access only
		Porvenir Street	Southbound access only
		Esperanza Street	Southbound access only
		De la Fe Street	Southbound access only
		Gonzalo Puyat Street	No access from opposite directions; one-way southbound entrance
		Paterno Street	Southbound access only
		Escaldo Street	Northbound access only
		Hidalgo Street	No access from opposite directions; Plaza Miranda on the west
		North end of Quezon Bridge (Route number changes from N170 to unnumbered)	
		Arlegui Street	Northbound access only
		Norzagaray Street	Northbound exit only
		Globo de Oro Street	One-way entrance
		Carlos Palanca Sr. Street	Southern terminus
1.000 mi = 1.609 km; 1.000 km = 0.621 mi: Incomplete access; Route transition

== Landmarks ==
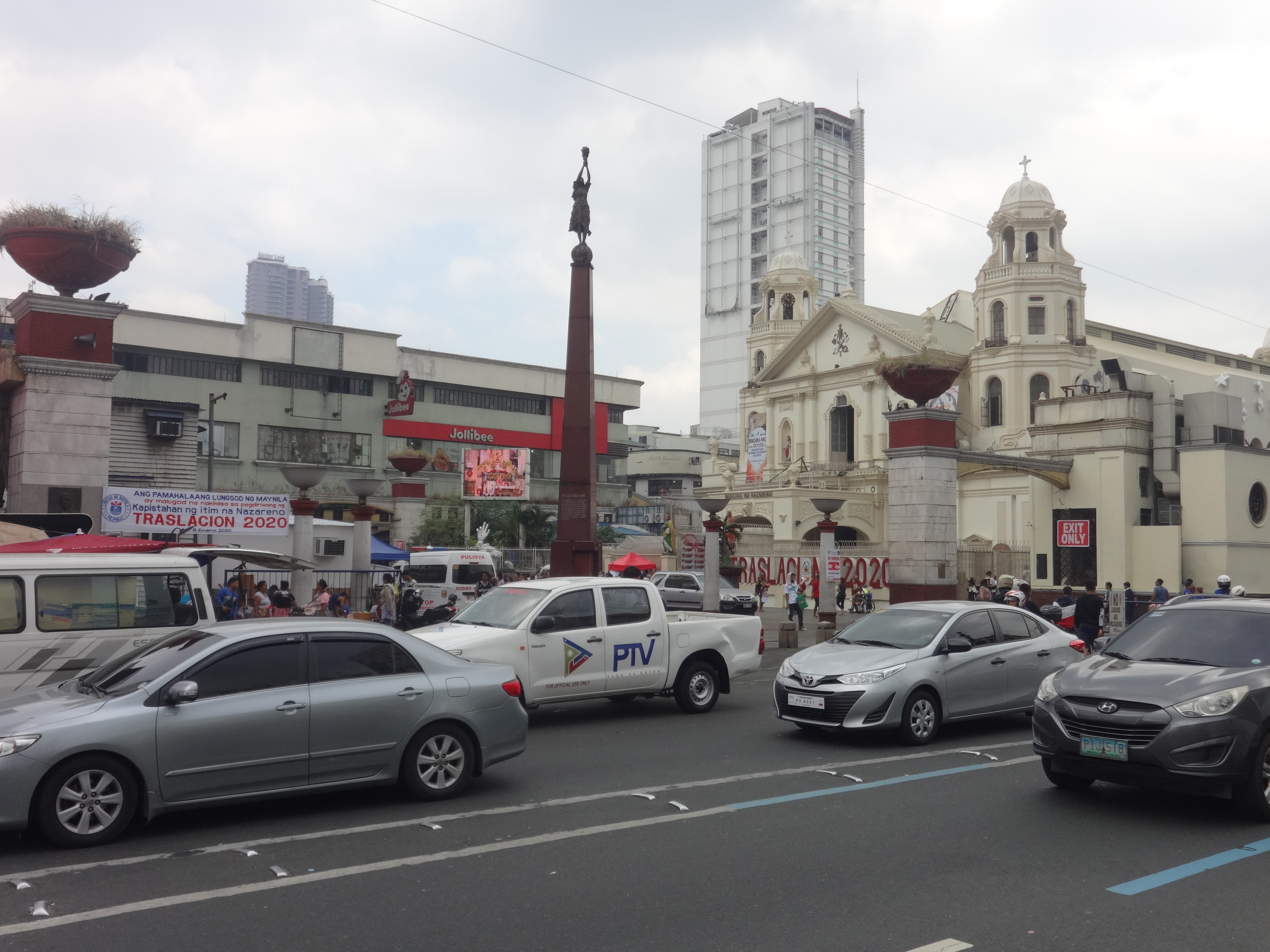
Quiapo Church and Plaza Miranda

From north to south:

- Manila City Jail
- Far Eastern University
- Isetann Cinerama Recto
- QQ Mall
- Sun Star Grand Hotel
- Raon Shopping Center
- Times Theater
- Quiapo Church
- Bahay Nakpil–Bautista
- Quiapo Market
- Plaza Miranda
- Hotel 99
- Quinta Market

== See also ==
- List of roads in Metro Manila
- Media related to Quezon Boulevard (Manila) at Wikimedia Commons
