= Engracia Cruz-Reyes =

Filipino chef (1892–1975)

Engracia Cruz Reyes
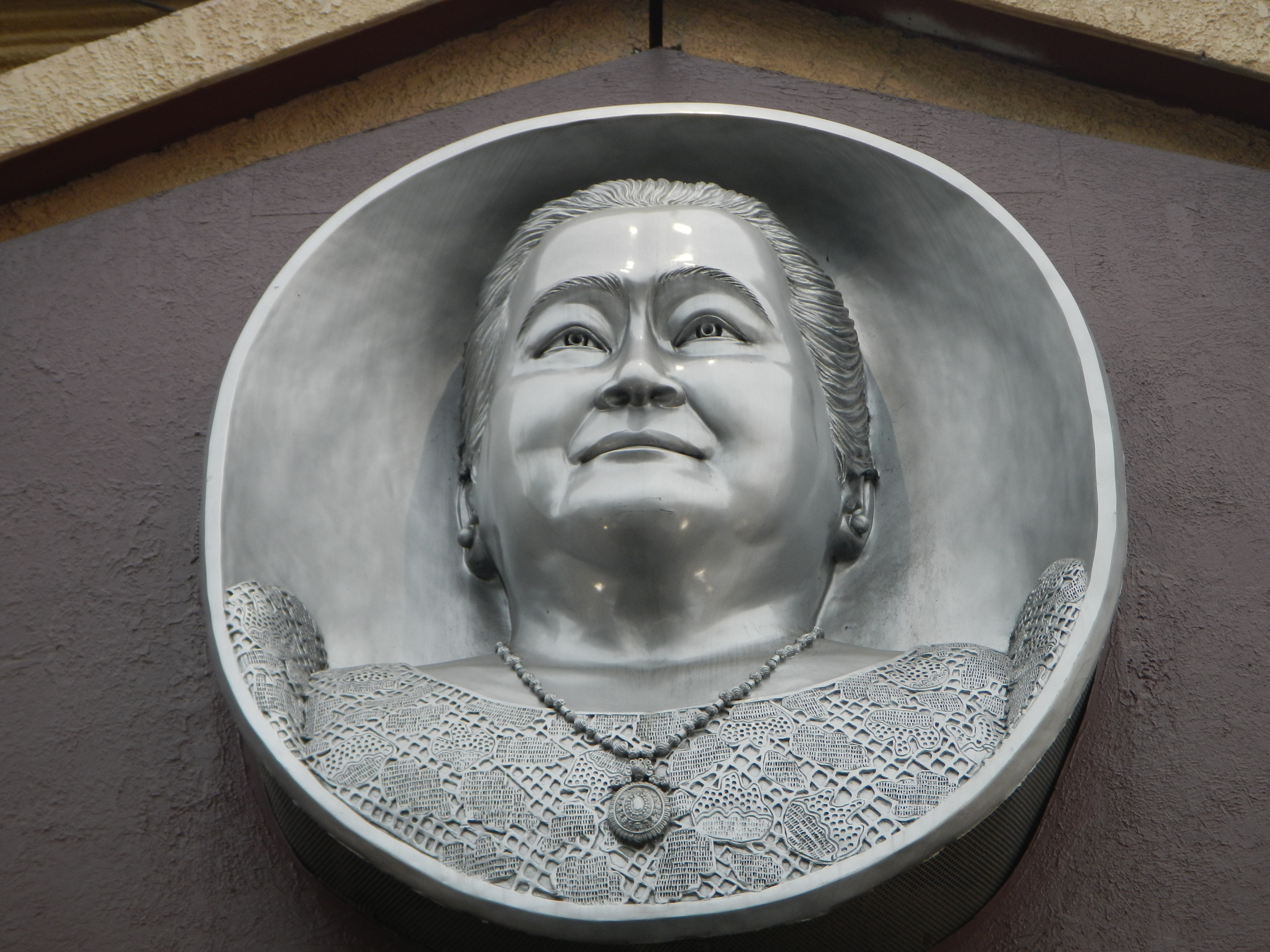
- Born: Engracia Cruz; April 16, 1892; Navotas, Manila, Captaincy General of the Philippines
- Died: July 6, 1975 (aged 83); Manila, Philippines
- Occupations: Chef and entrepreneur

Engracia Cruz-Reyes (April 16, 1892 — July 6, 1975) was a Filipino chef and entrepreneur. She was an active promoter of Filipino cuisine, especially through the restaurant chain she founded, The Aristocrat Restaurant.

== Early life ==
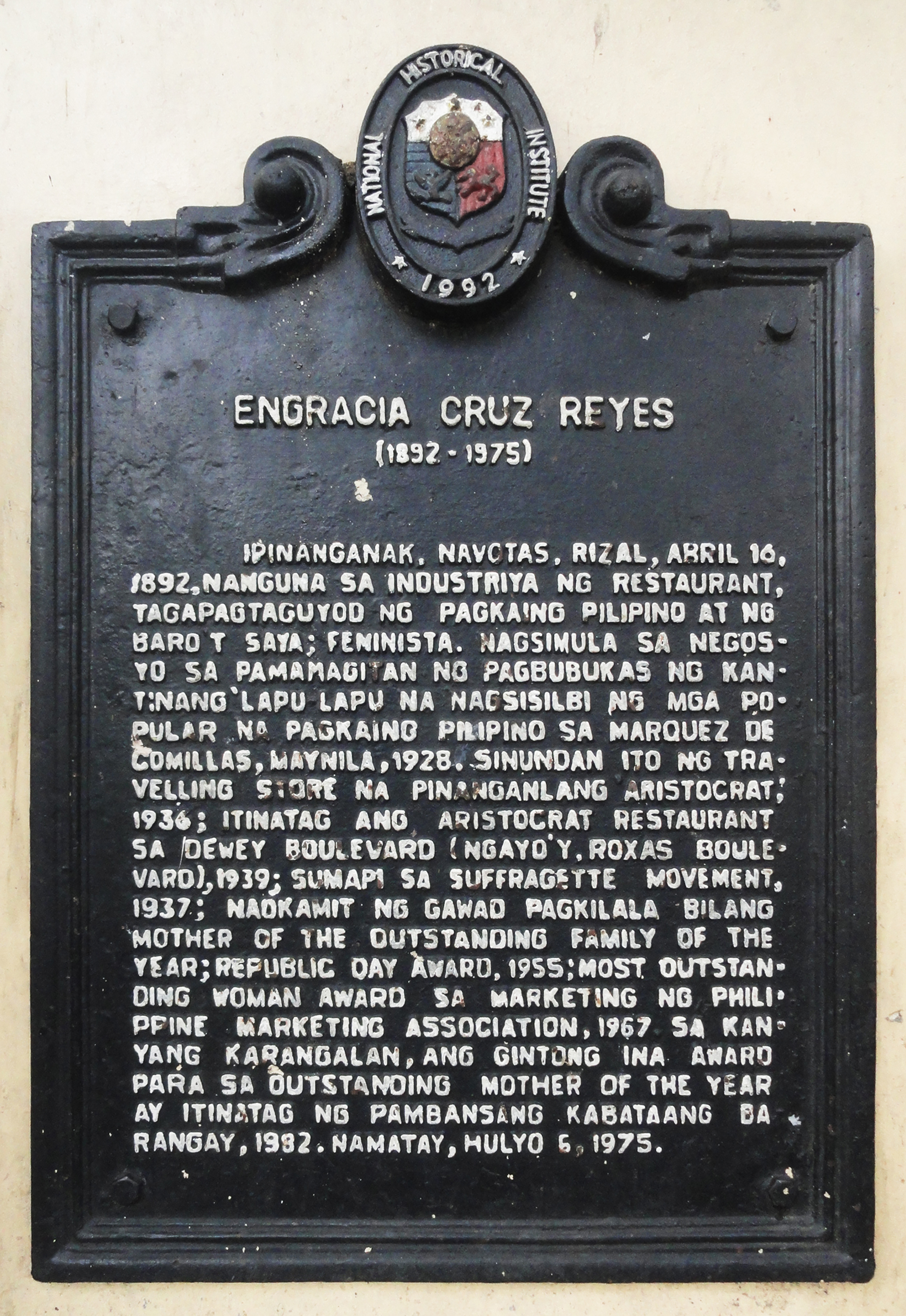
National historical marker installed in Malate, Manila

She was born to a poor family in Navotas in April 16, 1892. Her mother was a street peddler who sold food sauces and fruits, and who later managed a small neighborhood eatery popularly known in the Philippines as carinderias. She developed her cooking skills at a young age, having to prepare the meals for her five younger siblings while her parents were out working for a living. She was able to complete only four years of primary education.

In 1912, she married a young lawyer from her hometown, Alexander Reyes, who in 1948 would be appointed as an Associate Justice of the Philippine Supreme Court.

== The Aristocrat Restaurant ==
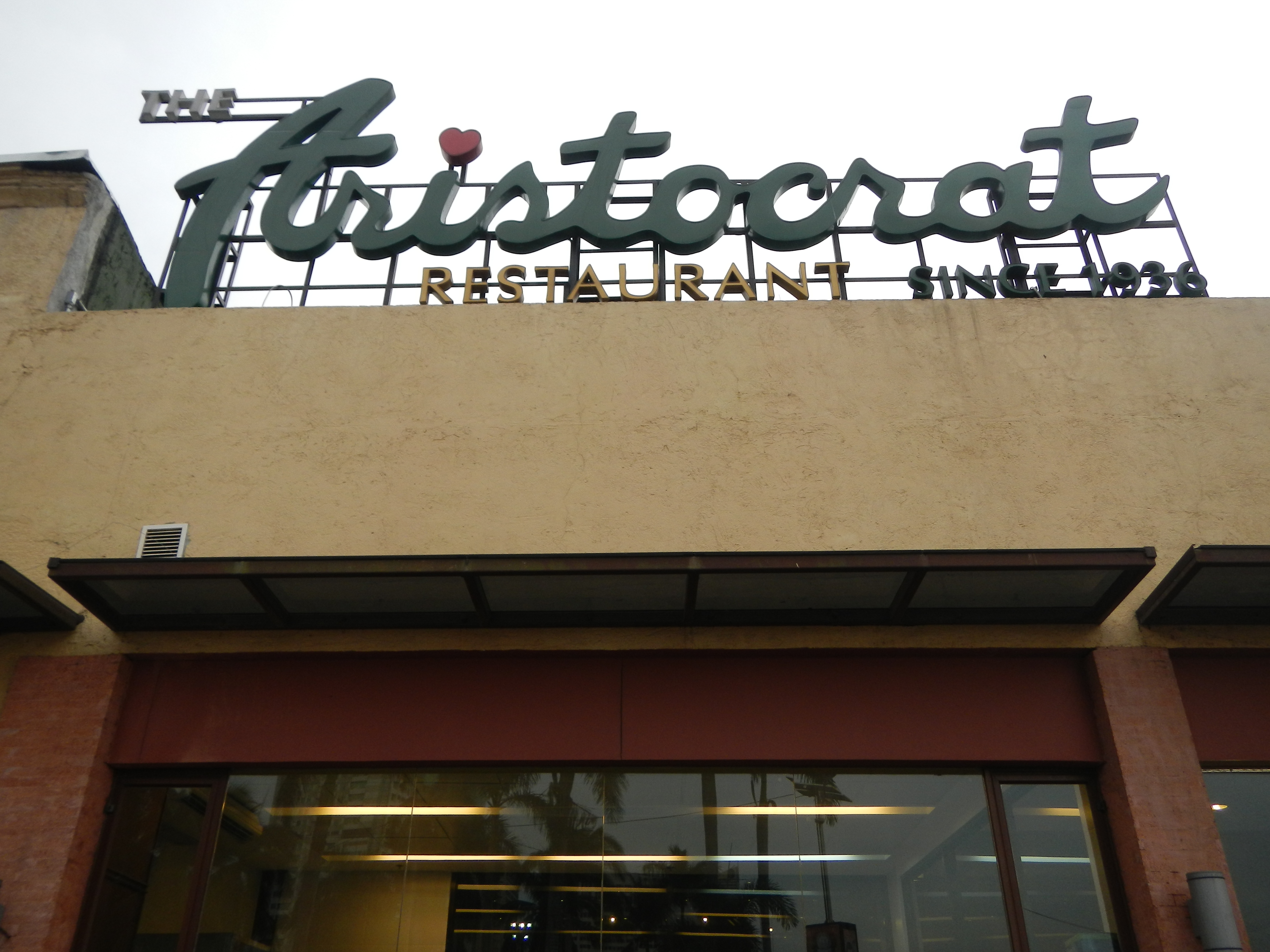
The Aristocrat Restaurant, Malate, Manila

To augment her family's income as her husband struggled to establish his legal practice, Cruz-Reyes set up in 1928 a small carinderia at Calle de Marques de Comillas in Ermita, Manila. She named her eatery "Lapu-Lapu" (after the Mactan chieftain who defeated Ferdinand Magellan in battle), adopted a native motif as interior decor, and served primarily Filipino fare. These nationalistic manifestations particularly stood out considering that the Philippines was then under American colonial rule.

By the 1930s, Cruz-Reyes was selling adobo sandwiches at the Luneta out of a car loaned to her by a future son-in-law. Her reputation as a cook had also grown due to the home dinners she cooked for many of the leading political figures of the day, friends of her now-prominent husband.

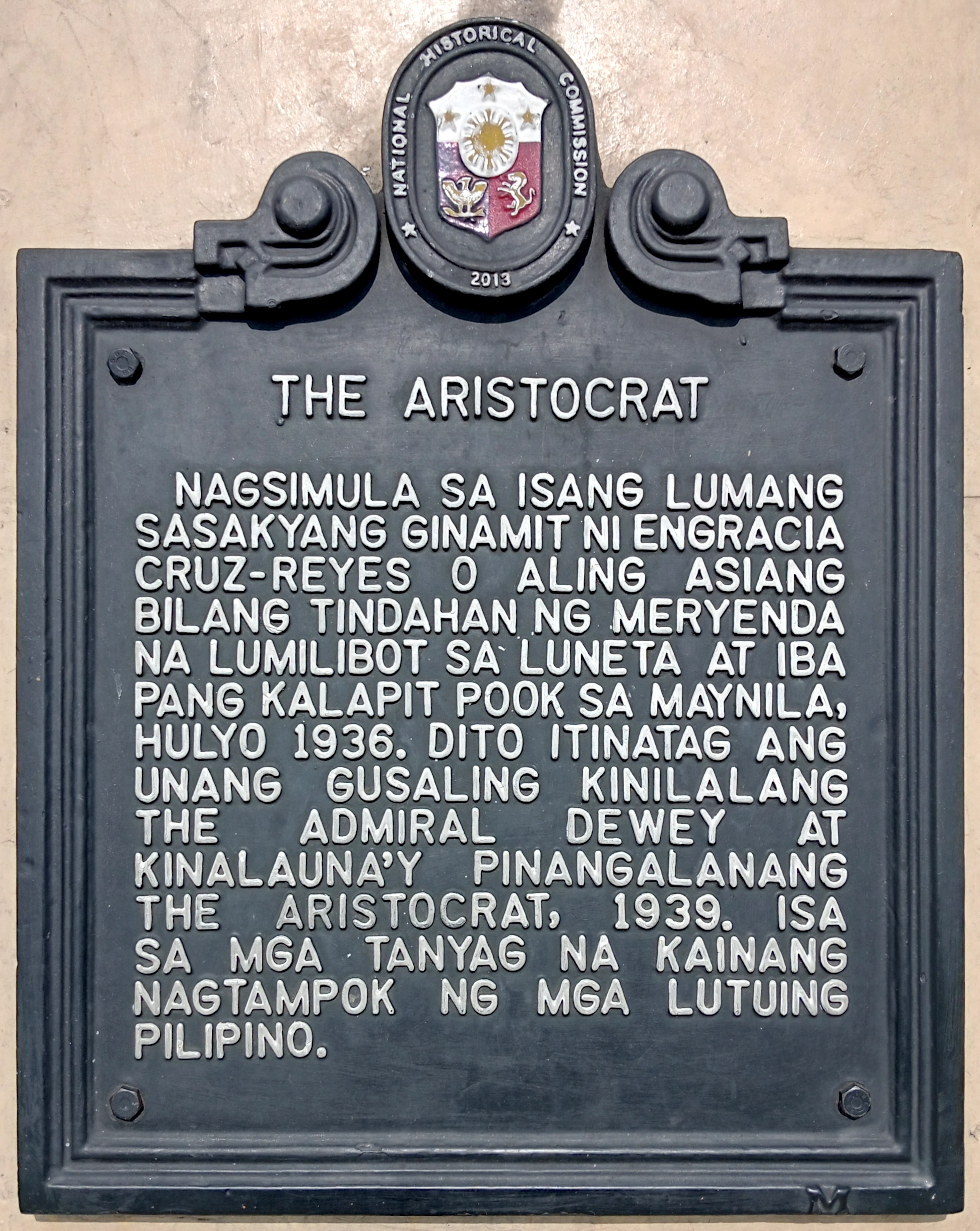
National historical marker unveiled in 2013 commemorating the restaurant

By 1936, Cruz-Reyes operated a rolling store — a mobile restaurant featuring a menu stacked with traditional Filipino dishes — which she named "The Aristocrat". The first Aristocrat operated out of a Studebaker van. Within two years, Cruz-Reyes opened a permanent restaurant at Dewey Boulevard in Malate, Manila. It is one of the oldest restaurants in Manila. The choice of name was ironic and pointed, for during that period, Filipino cuisine was not considered as appropriate fare in the homes of the Filipino elite.

The restaurant was immediately successful, its original menu featuring adobo, a chicken sandwich, dinuguan and arroz caldo. In the 1940s it was a popular venue for its sandwiches and snacks, and it was frequented by personalities such as Jose W. Diokno and his future wife Carmen "Nena" Icasiano, who would arrive riding Diokno's old car when they went out together on group dates. By the 1950s, the menu had expanded to feature such present-day specialties such as chicken and pork barbecue skewers, kare-kare, chicken honey, crispy pata and even a variation on the adobo sandwiches Cruz-Reyes used to sell at the Luneta. The popularity of Aristocrat also helped usher a renewed popularity of Filipino cuisine as worthy "first-class" fare, a reputation Cruz-Reyes enhanced by her insistence of serving such dishes in the dinners she was often called to cater at Malacañan Palace.

== Honors and legacy ==
Cruz-Reyes is acknowledged as a pioneer in the Philippine food and restaurant industry. Her clan has remained active in the food industry, not only through The Aristocrat Restaurant, but in the manufacture of mass-market processed food products.

One of her daughters, Teresita, served as the inspiration for the renowned Mama Sita's brand of condiments. Additionally, two of Cruz-Reyes' grandsons would establish sister restaurants of The Aristocrat. Francisco "Frank" Reyes, who had previously worked as an accountant at The Aristocrat, founded Reyes Barbecue in 2002, while another grandson established Alex III, which pays homage to their family patriarch, Alexander Reyes.

Cruz-Reyes was active in the cause of women's suffrage until Filipino women were granted the right to vote in 1937.

Cruz-Reyes died in 1975. During her lifetime, she was the recipient of several honors, including the Mother of the Year award from President Ramon Magsaysay. In celebration of the centenary of her birth in 1992, she was honored with a commemorative stamp and the renaming of a street in Ermita after her.

The Aristocrat restaurant, along with its iconic lumpiang Shanghai, ranked 108th in the 2023 TasteAtlas list of "Most Legendary Restaurants in the World & Their Iconic Dishes."
