= Battle of Zapote Bridge (1897) =

Battle during the Philippine Revolution

- Part of the Philippine Revolution
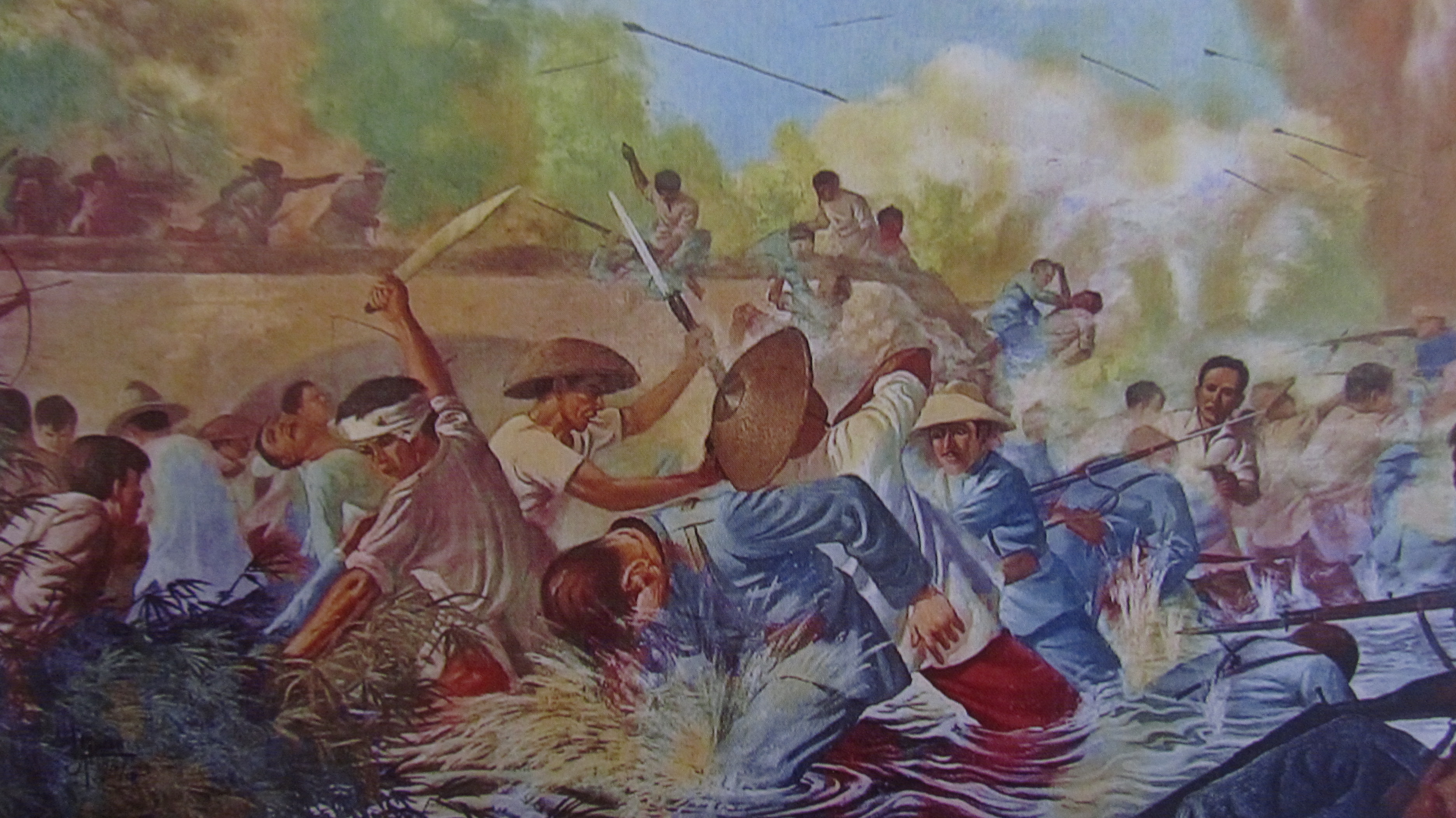
- Battle of Zapote Bridge by Vicente Dizon
Date	February 17, 1897
Location	Zapote Bridge, Bacoor and Las Piñas (Manila–Cavite provincial boundary), Captaincy General of the Philippines 14°27′50.36″N 120°57′59.00″E
Result	Filipino victory

Belligerents
Katipunan: Magdalo	Spanish Empire: Guardia Civil

Commanders and leaders
Emilio Aguinaldo; Edilberto Evangelista †; Tomas Mascardo (WIA)	Camilo de Polavieja; José de Lachambre

Strength
~10,000 men	16,000 men

Casualties and losses
450 killed, 900+ wounded	441 killed, 870+ wounded, 313 captured

The Battle of Zapote Bridge was fought on February 17, 1897, as part of the Philippine Revolution. Filipino revolutionary forces led by General Emilio Aguinaldo defeated Spanish forces under the command of Governor-General Camilo de Polavieja. In this battle, General Edilberto Evangelista (a Filipino civil engineer, trench builder and member of the Katipunan) was killed.

== Background ==
With the loss of the revolutionary battle and the opening of the second phase of the war, the Spaniards began their campaign to recapture territories. This campaign was in Filipino hands in the early phase of the revolution after the decisive battles of Binakayan and Dalahican in 1896. Governor-General Camilo de Polavieja now fully aware that the mainweight of the revolution was in Cavite, decided to launch a two-pronged assault to defeat the revolutionaries led by Aguinaldo. He ordered General José de Lachambre to march with his much bigger force against Silang to take on the Katipuneros from the rear, while he himself would engage the Filipinos head on - known as the "Cavite Offensive". More than 20,000 Spaniards marched from Manila towards Cavite province to reclaim the provincial towns lost to the revolutionaries. The revolutionaries then planned a counterattack to stop the Spanish offensive in Cavite. The site of the battle was planned for Zapote Bridge in Bacoor.

== Battle ==
Hiding his army of 10,000 regulars and irregulars in the bushes of the Zapote River's southern bank, armed only with spears, bolo knives and improvised firearms, Aguinaldo ordered soldiers to plant dynamite along the bridge and place pointed bamboo sticks in the river beds below the bridge. Several hours later, 16,000 Spaniards began to cross the bridge. The trap was sprung and the dynamite was detonated, killing several Spanish troops and injuring many more. The rebels then emerged from the bushes and fought hand-to-hand, repelling consecutive waves of enemy troops charging across the river. During this fight Evangelista was shot in the head and died.

After the battle, the demoralized Spanish soldiers retreated towards Muntinlupa. The Filipino side suffered 450 dead with more than 900 wounded. The Spanish side suffered 441 dead and approximately 870 wounded. In addition, 313 Spanish soldiers were captured.

== Aftermath ==
Aguinaldo and his troops resumed the liberation of captured Cavite towns little by little, following battles at Binakayan and Dalahican. Two days later, however, the Filipino offensive was halted when news reached Aguinaldo that the Spanish had resumed their offensive after storming the rebel stronghold in Silang, Cavite. As the Spanish forces were marching toward Imus, the seat of Aguinaldo's faction, Aguinaldo redirected his troops to Perez, Dasmariñas, where the Battle of Perez Dasmariñas had begun.

== See also ==
- Battle of Binakayan-Dalahican
- Battle of Perez Dasmariñas
- Katipunan
- Emilio Aguinaldo
- Edilberto Evangelista
- Tomas Mascardo
- José de Lachambre
