= Philippine Revolution =

1896–1898 Philippine war of independence against the Spanish Empire

- Part of decolonization of Asia and Spanish–American War
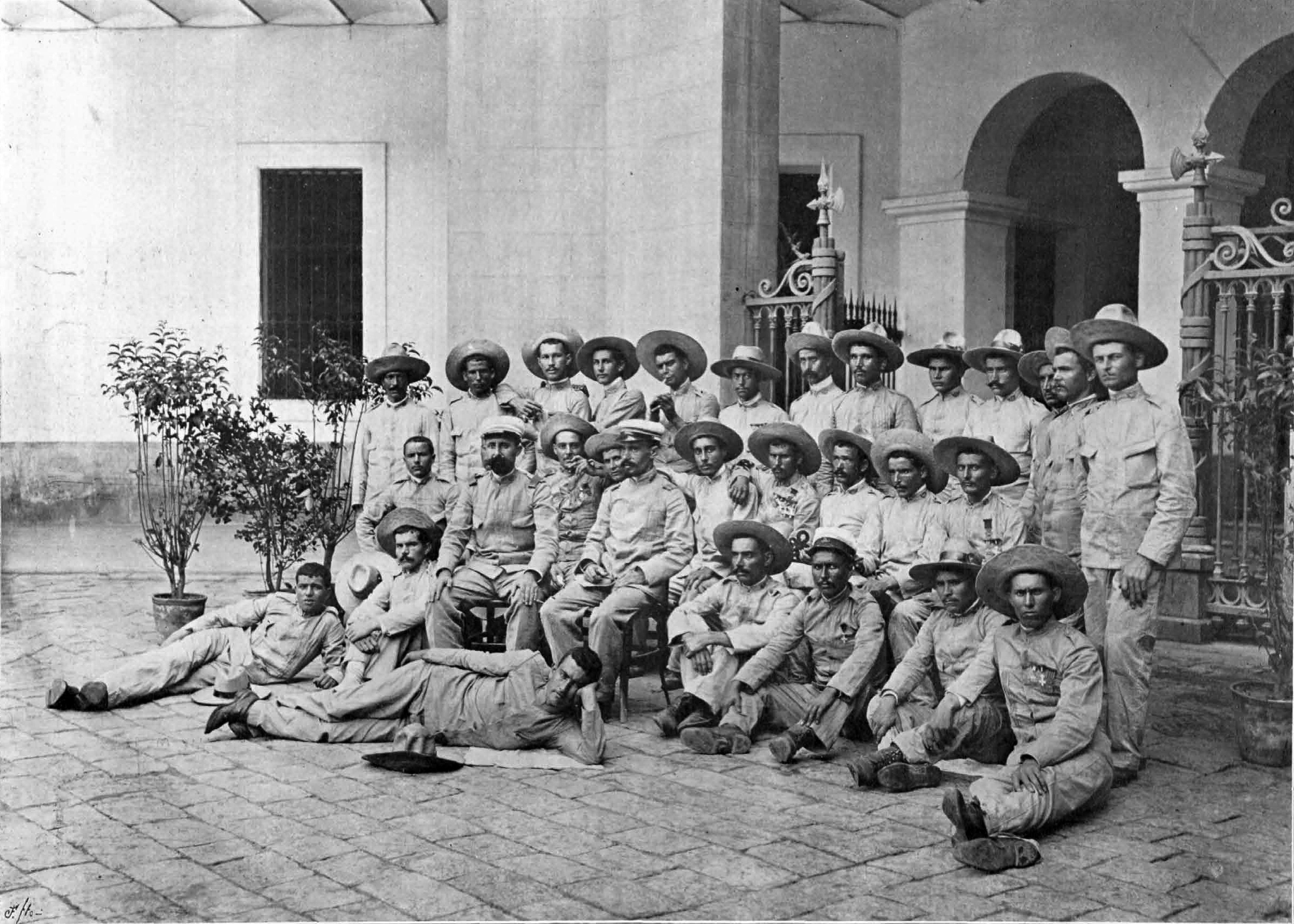
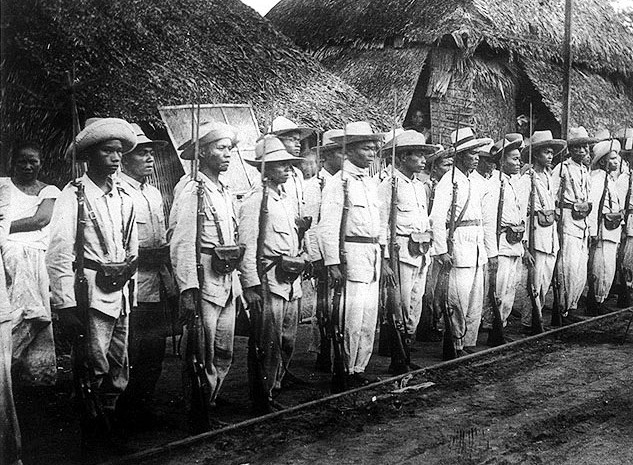
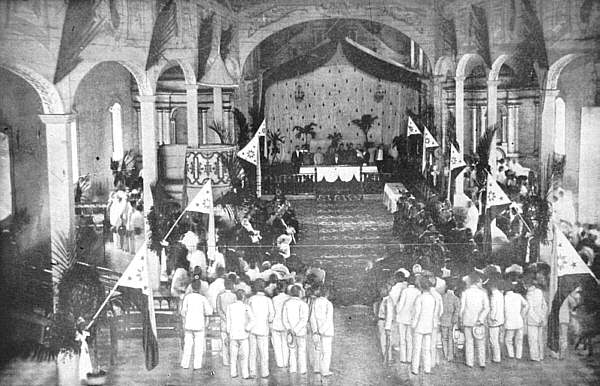
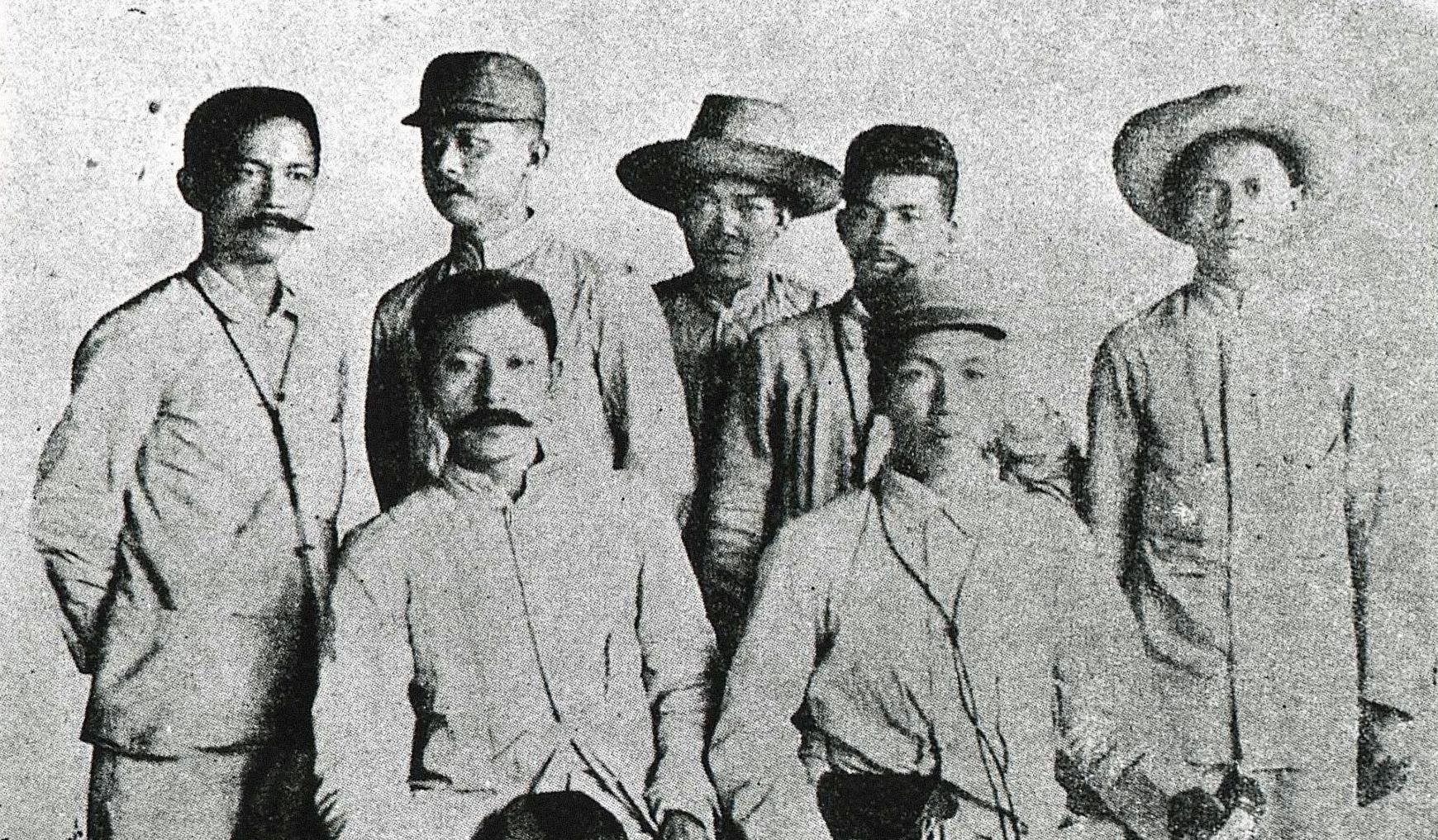
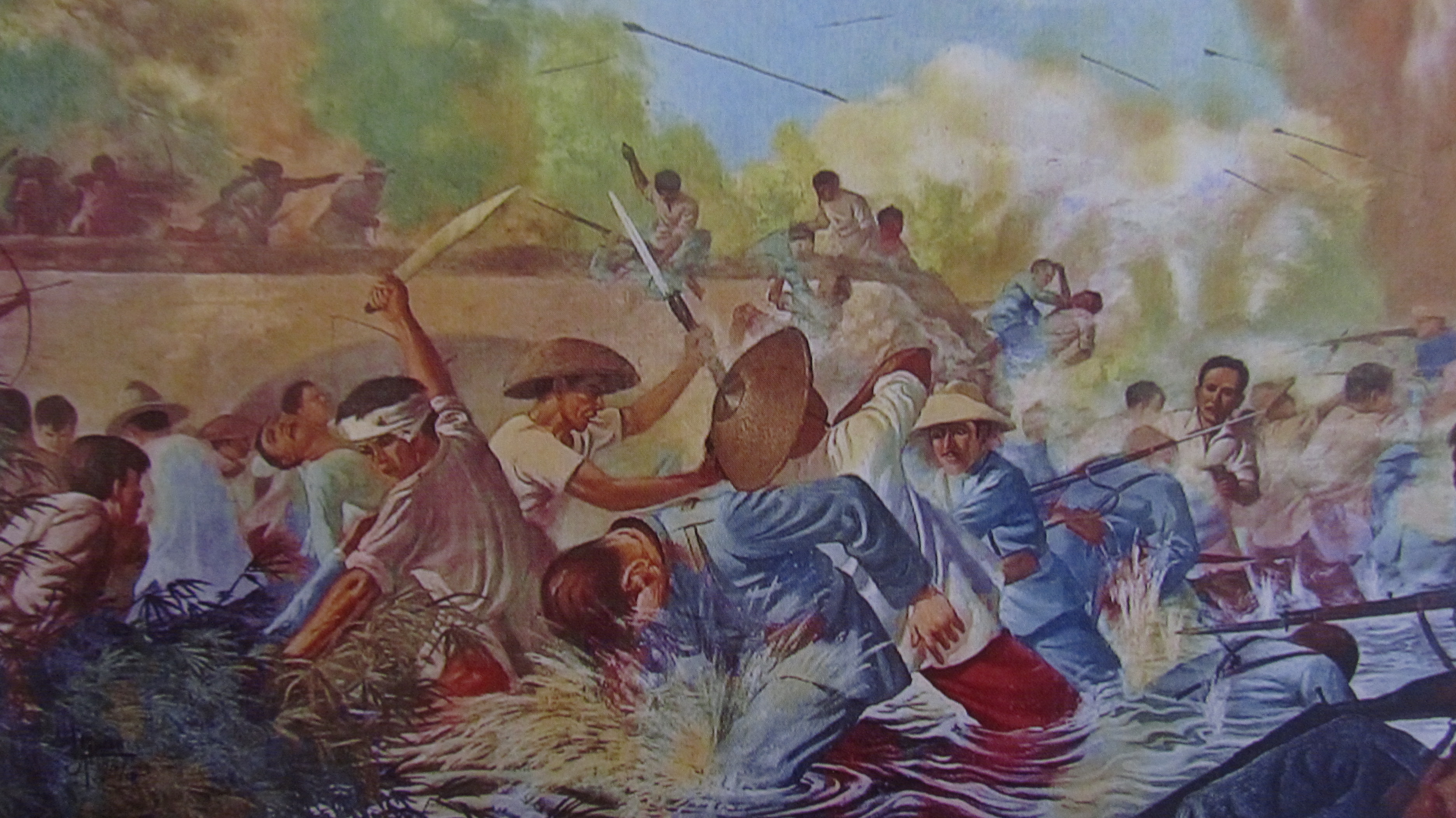
- Clockwise from top left: Surviving Spanish troops in Barcelona after the Siege of Baler, Filipino soldiers during the near end of the Revolution, Filipino negotiators for the Pact of Biak-na-Bato, Painting of the Battle of Zapote Bridge, and the Malolos Congress
Date	First phase: August 26, 1896 – December 14, 1897 (1 year, 3 months, 2 weeks and 4 days) (Ceasefire); Second phase: May 21, 1898 – June 12, 1898 (3 weeks and 1 day) (Return of Aguinaldo with American indirect assistance, Proclamation of independence)
Location	Philippines, Spanish East Indies
Result	Filipino Military Victory (see Aftermath): Filipinos drive out Spanish colonial troops in the majority of the Philippine Archipelago (Except Manila); Philippine independence declared on June 12, 1898; First Philippine Republic established; Philippine–American War started soon after
Territorial changes	Cession of Philippine sovereignty by Spain to the United States through the Treaty of Paris: Filipinos control all of the Philippines except Manila and the port city of Cavite el Nuevo

Belligerents
1896–1897; Katipunan: Sovereign Tagalog Nation (until March 1897); Tejeros Government (March–November 1897); Republic of Biak-na-Bato (November–December 1897)	1896–1897; Spain: Captaincy General of the Philippines; Province of La Pampanga
1898; Philippine Revolutionaries: Dictatorial Government (May–June); Revolutionary Government (from June); United States (May)	1898; Spain: Captaincy General of the Philippines; Province of La Pampanga
1899; Philippine Republic: Negros Republic; Zamboanga Republic	1899; United States: Military Government (1899–1901); Insular Government (1901–1902)

Commanders and leaders
See list: Andrés Bonifacio (executed); Emilio Aguinaldo; Román Basa (executed); Teodoro Plata (executed); Ladislao Diwa; Emilio Jacinto; Gregoria de Jesús; Julio Nakpil; Macario Sakay; Mariano Álvarez; Mariano Trías; Santiago Álvarez; Baldomero Aguinaldo; Miguel Malvar; Artemio Ricarte; Pío del Pilar; Tomás Mascardo; Gregorio del Pilar; Francisco Macabulos; Teresa Magbanua; Pantaleón Villegas X; Arcadio Maxilom; Aniceto Lacson; George Dewey; Wesley Merritt	See list: Ramón Blanco; Camilo de Polavieja; Fernando Primo de Rivera; Basilio Augustín; Fermin Jáudenes; Diego de los Ríos; José Olaguer Feliú; José de Lachambre

Strength
1896: 100,000–400,000	1896: 26,622 personnel

Casualties and losses
≈ 28,600 KIA or DOW; Many more lost to disease	260 KIA and 920 WIA; Many more lost to disease
- Many Filipino civilians dead from both Spanish troops and Katipunan atrocities

The Philippine Revolution (Note: (Filipino: Himagsikang Pilipino or Rebolusyong Pilipino; Spanish: Revolución Filipina or Guerra Tagala)) was a war of independence waged by the revolutionary organization Katipunan against the Spanish Empire from 1896 to 1898. It was the culmination of the 333-year colonial rule of Spain in the archipelago. The Philippines was one of the last major colonies of the Spanish Empire, which had already suffered a massive decline in the 1820s. Cuba rebelled in 1895, and in 1898, the United States intervened and the Spanish soon capitulated. In June 1898, Philippine revolutionaries declared independence. However, it was not recognized by Spain, which later sold the islands to the United States in the Treaty of Paris of 1898.

Led by Andrés Bonifacio, the Katipunan was formed in secrecy in 1892 in the wake of the nascent La Liga Filipina, an organization created by Filipino nationalist José Rizal and others in Spain with the goal of Philippine representation to the Spanish Parliament. Katipunan soon gained influence across the islands, and sought an eventual armed revolution. However, the revolution started prematurely in August 1896 upon its discovery by Spanish authorities in Manila. The organization quickly declared war against Spain in Caloocan. Early battles and skirmishes were centered around sieging the capital city of Manila led by Bonifacio himself, which ultimately failed. However, revolutionaries in the neighboring provinces fared better, particularly in Cavite, where rebels led by Mariano Álvarez and cousins Baldomero and Emilio Aguinaldo won early major victories. This disparity in success, along with multiple factors, contributed to the eventual power struggle from within Katipunan's leadership. Two factions formed: Bonifacio's Magdiwang and Aguinaldo's Magdalo. This struggle culminated in the 1897 elections in Tejeros, which saw Emilio Aguinaldo elected as president in absentia. Bonifacio nullified the results after a Magdalo member questioned his election as the Secretary of the Interior. This resulted in a schism, with Bonifacio's supporters alleging that the elections were fraudulent, and Bonifacio himself refusing to recognize the results. In April 1897, Aguinaldo ordered the arrest of Bonifacio. A trial was set in Maragondon, where the Magdalo-led jury found Bonifacio and his brother Procopio guilty of treason and sentenced both of them to death. Despite calls for commuting the sentence for the sake of national unity, the brothers were executed in May 1897. Later that year, Aguinaldo's government and Spanish authorities signed the Pact of Biak-na-Bato, which temporarily reduced hostilities. Filipino revolutionary officers exiled themselves to Hong Kong. However, the hostilities never completely ceased.

On April 21, 1898, after the sinking of the USS Maine in Havana Harbor, the United States declared war against Spain, starting the Spanish-American War. On May 1, the United States Asiatic Squadron, under George Dewey, decisively defeated the Spanish Navy in the Battle of Manila Bay, effectively seizing control of the area surrounding Manila. On May 19, Aguinaldo, unofficially allied with the United States, returned to the Philippines and resumed attacks against the Spaniards. By June, the rebels had gained control of nearly the entirety of the countryside, while the cities remained under Spanish control. On June 12, Aguinaldo issued the Philippine Declaration of Independence in Kawit. Although this signified the end date of the revolution, neither Spain nor the United States recognized Philippine independence. The Treaty of Paris was signed between Spain and the United States, formally ending the war and the Spanish rule to the islands. Despite attempts by the Filipino government, there were no Filipinos in the treaty.

On February 4, 1899, fighting broke out between the Filipino and American forces, beginning the Philippine–American War. Aguinaldo immediately declared war, ordering "that peace and friendly relations with the Americans be broken and that the latter be treated as enemies". In June 1899, the First Philippine Republic formally declared war against the United States, which ended with the Philippine Organic Act in July 1902. As a result, the islands become an unincorporated territory of the United States. A commonwealth government was formed in 1935, with Manuel L. Quezon, Aguinaldo's aide-de-camp during the revolution, assuming the presidency. The Philippines was intended to become independent after a ten-year commonwealth period but was cut short by the advent of the Second World War in the Pacific. The country finally became fully independent on July 4, 1946, 50 years after the start of the revolution.

== Summary ==
While there are uprisings in the Philippines against Spanish authorities before the 19th century, these were sporadic, unorganized nationally, and were quickly suppressed. The colony was governed from Mexico since 1565, with administrative costs sustained by subsidies via the galleon trade between Manila and Acapulco. However, the galleon trade ended in 1815 due to increased competition with foreign traders. After Mexico became independent in 1821, the Philippines was governed directly from Madrid for the first time. The authorities began looking for new sources of revenue to sustain its colony, which only saw limited trade with foreign traders by the start of the 19th century. In 1809, the first British firms were established in Manila, and by 1834, a royal decree opened the city to world trade. At this point, revolutionary ideas from the French Revolution entered the colony through literature, which resulted in the rise of an enlightened principalía class in society.

In Spain, the deeply unpopular Queen Isabella II was deposed in 1868 and was replaced by a democratic government led by General Francisco Serrano. In 1869, Serrano appointed Carlos María de la Torre as the governor-general of the colony. The democratic ideas of the revolution in Spain were extended to the Philippines, where liberalism was introduced by the de la Torre government to the colony. However, it did not last long, as the election of Amadeo of Savoy to the throne of Spain led to the replacement of de la Torre in 1871. In 1872, the government of the succeeding governor-general, Rafael de Izquierdo, experienced a mutiny of soldiers at Fort San Felipe in Cavite el Viejo. The mutiny was quickly suppressed, with numerous arrests made over the next seven days. Among those who were implicated with the mutiny were the secular priests José Burgos, Mariano Gomez and friar Jacinto Zamora, who were executed by garrote in Bagumbayan. Their execution had a profound effect on many Filipinos; nationalist and writer José Rizal would later dedicate his novel El filibusterismo to their memory.

Many Filipinos who were arrested for possible rebellion were deported to Spain, where they were distributed to different locations, mainly to their African colony of Bioko, as well as to Chafarinas Islands and Ceuta in the Mediterranean, and the Spanish colonies of the Marianas and the Carolines in the Pacific. Some of them, however, managed to escape to Hong Kong, Yokohama, Singapore, Paris, London, Vienna, Berlin, and even in some parts of Spain. These people met fellow Filipino students and other exiles who had escaped from penal colonies. Bound together by a common fate, they established an organization known as the Propaganda Movement. These émigrés used their writings primarily to condemn Spanish abuses and seek reforms to the colonial government.

José Rizal's novels, Noli Me Tángere (Touch Me Not, 1887) and El Filibusterismo (The Filibuster, 1891), exposed Spanish abuses in socio-political and religious aspects. The publication of his first novel brought the infamous agrarian conflict in his hometown of Calamba, La Laguna, in 1888, when Dominican haciendas fell into trouble of submitting government taxes. In 1892, after his return from the Americas, Rizal established La Liga Filipina (The Filipino League), a Filipino association organized to seek reforms in the colonial government. When the Spaniards learned that Rizal was in the Philippines, they arrested and deported him a few days after the Liga was established.

Upon hearing that Rizal had been deported to Dapitan, Liga member Andrés Bonifacio and his fellows established a secret organization named Katipunan in a house located in Tondo, Manila, while more conservative members led by Domingo Franco and Numeriano Adriano would later establish the Cuerpo de Compromisarios. The Katipunan obtained an overwhelming number of members and attracted the lowly classes. In June 1896, Bonifacio sent an emissary to Dapitan to obtain Rizal's support, but Rizal refused to participate in an armed revolution. On August 19, 1896, Katipunan was discovered by a Spanish friar, which resulted in the start of the Philippine Revolution.

The revolution initially flared up in Central Luzon. The armed resistance eventually spread throughout the Southern Tagalog region, particularly in Cavite province, where towns were gradually liberated during the early months of the uprising. In 1896 and 1897, successive conventions at Imus and Tejeros decided the new republic's fate. In November 1897, the Republic of Biak-na-Bato was established, and the insurgent government promulgated a constitution. On May 1, 1898, the Battle of Manila Bay took place as part of the Spanish–American War. On May 24, Emilio Aguinaldo, who had returned from voluntary exile on May 19, announced in Cavite, "...I return to assume command of all the forces for the attainment of our lofty aspirations, establishing a dictatorial government which will set forth decrees under my sole responsibility, ...". On June 12, Aguinaldo proclaimed Philippine independence. On June 18, Aguinaldo issued a decree proclaiming a Dictatorial Government led by himself. On June 23, Aguinaldo issued another decree, which replaced the Dictatorial Government with a Revolutionary Government. In 1898, between June and September 10, the Malolos Congress elections were held by the Revolutionary Government, resulting in Emilio Aguinaldo being elected as President of the Philippines. On February 2, 1899, hostilities broke out between U.S. and Filipino forces. The Malolos Constitution was adopted in a session convened on September 15, 1898. It was promulgated on January 21, 1899, creating the First Philippine Republic with Aguinaldo as President. On June 12, 1899, Aguinaldo promulgated a declaration of war against the U.S., beginning the Philippine–American War. U.S. forces captured Aguinaldo on March 23, 1901, and he swore allegiance to the U.S. on April 1. On July 4, 1902, U.S. President Theodore Roosevelt proclaimed a complete pardon and amnesty for all Filipinos who had participated in the conflict, effectively ending the war.

== Background ==
=== Origins and causes ===
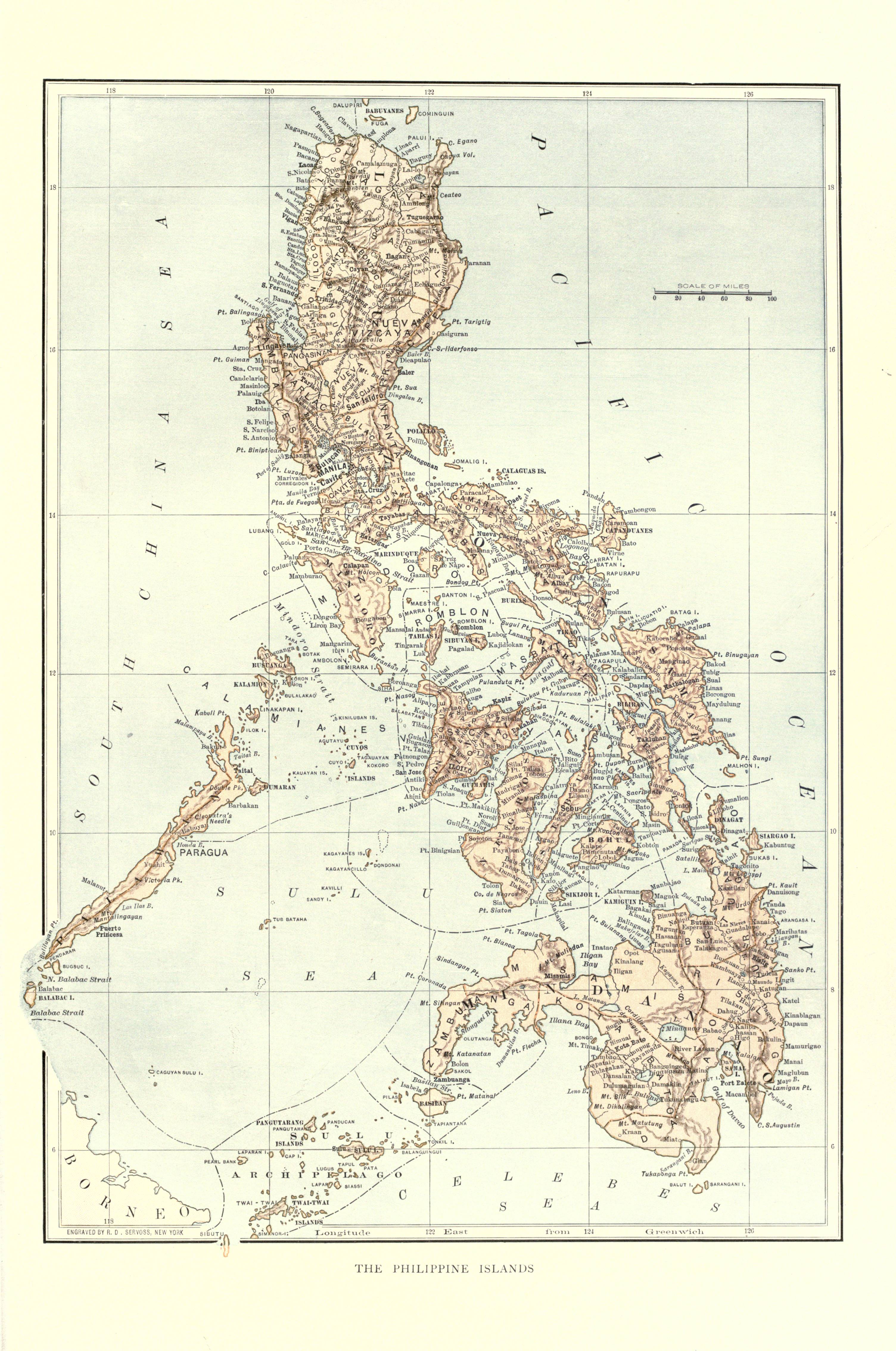
Map of the Philippines at the end of the 19th century.

The Philippine Revolution was an accumulation of ideas and exposition to the international community, which led to the start of nationalistic endeavours. The rise of Filipino nationalism was slow, but inevitable. Abuses by the Spanish government, military and clergy prevalent during three centuries of colonial rule, and the exposure of these abuses by the "ilustrados" in the late 19th century, paved the way for a united Filipino people. However, the growth of nationalism was slow because of the difficulty in social and economic intercourse among the Filipinos. In a dated letter written by the Filipino writer José P. Rizal to Father Vicente García of Ateneo Municipal de Manila, Rizal states that:

There is, then, in the Philippines, a progress or improvement which is individual, but there is no national progress.

— January 17, 1891

==== Opening of Manila to world trade ====
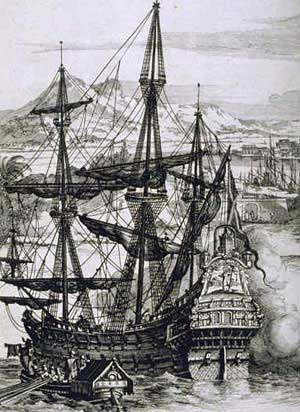
The Manila-Acapulco Trade was carried in galleons for two and a half centuries

Before the opening of Manila to foreign trade, the Spanish authorities discouraged foreign merchants from residing in the colony and engaging in business. The royal decree of February 2, 1800, prohibited foreigners from living in the Philippines. as did the royal decrees of 1807 and 1816. In 1823, Governor-General Mariano Ricafort promulgated an edict prohibiting foreign merchants from engaging in retail trade and visiting the provinces for the purpose of trading. It was reissued by Governor-General Luis Lardizábal in 1840. A royal decree issued in 1844 prohibited foreigners from traveling to the provinces under any pretext whatsoever, and in 1857, several anti-foreigner laws were renewed.

With the wide acceptance of laissez-faire doctrines in the later part of the 18th century, Spain relaxed its mercantilist policies. The British capture and occupation of Manila in 1762–1764 made Spain realize the impossibility of isolating the colony from world intercourse and commerce. In 1789, foreign vessels were given permission to transport Asian goods to the port of Manila. Even before the 1780s, many foreign ships, including Yankee clipper ships, had visited Manila regardless of anti-foreigner regulations. In 1790, Governor-General Félix Berenguer de Marquina recommended that the King of Spain open Manila to world commerce. Furthermore, the bankruptcy of the Royal Company of the Philippines (Real Compaña de Filipinas) catapulted the Spanish king to open Manila to world trade. In a royal decree issued on September 6, 1834, the privileges of the company were revoked and the port of Manila was opened to trade.

===== Economic surveys, port openings and admission of foreign firms =====
Shortly after the opening of Manila to world trade, the Spanish merchants began to lose their commercial supremacy in the Philippines. In 1834, restrictions against foreign traders were relaxed when Manila became an open port. By the end of 1859, there were 15 foreign firms in Manila. Seven of these were British, three were American, two were French, two were Swiss and one was German.

In 1834, some American merchants settled in Manila and invested heavily in business. Two American business firms were established—the Russell, Sturgis & Company and the Peele, Hubbell & Company. These became two of the leading business firms. At first, Americans had an edge over their British competitors, because they offered high prices for Philippine exports such as hemp, sugar, and tobacco.

American trade supremacy did not last long. In the face of stiff British competition, they gradually lost control over the Philippine business market. This decline was due to lack of support from the U.S. government and lack of U.S. trade bases in the Orient. In 1875, Russell, Sturgis & Company went into bankruptcy, followed by Peele, Hubbell & Company in 1887. Soon after, British merchants, including James Adam Smith, Lawrence H. Bell and Robert P. Wood, dominated the financial sector in Manila.

In 1842, alarmed by the domination of foreign merchants in the economy of Manila, the Spanish government sent Sinibaldo de Mas, a Spanish diplomat, to the Philippines in order to conduct an economic survey of the Philippines and submit recommendations. After an intensive investigation of colonial affairs in the Philippines, Mas submitted his official report to the Crown. The report, Informe sobre el estado de las Islas Filipinas en 1842, was published at Madrid in 1843. Mas recommended the following: opening of more ports to promote foreign trade, encouragement of Chinese immigration to stimulate agricultural development, and abolition of the tobacco monopoly.

In response to Sinibaldo de Mas's recommendations, more ports were opened by Spain. The ports of Sual, Pangasinan, Iloilo and Zamboanga were opened in 1855, Cebu was opened in 1860, and both Legazpi and Tacloban were opened in 1873.

===== Enlightenment =====
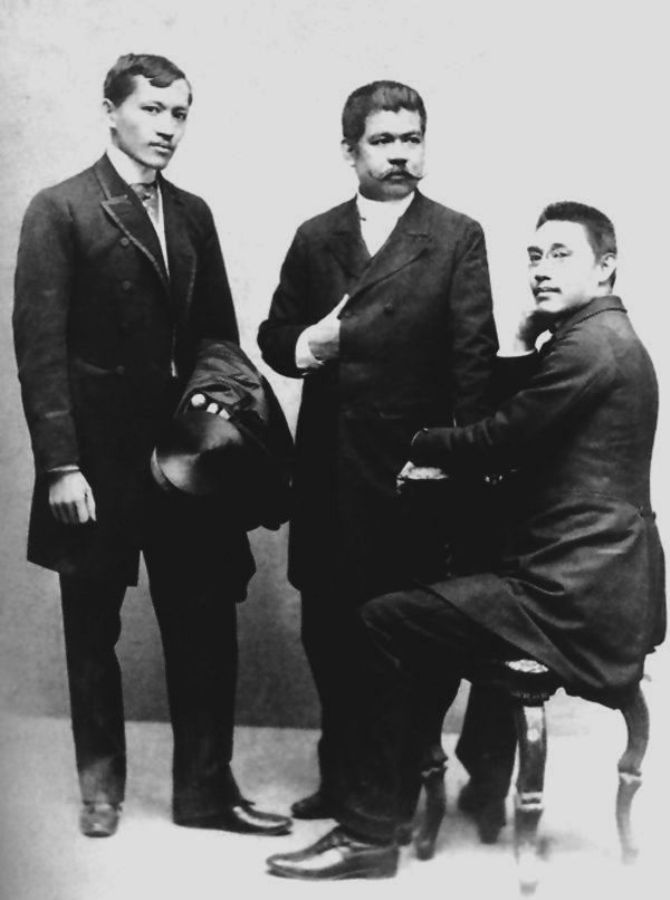
Leaders of the reform movement in Spain: José Rizal, Marcelo H. del Pilar and Mariano Ponce. Photo was taken in Spain in 1890.

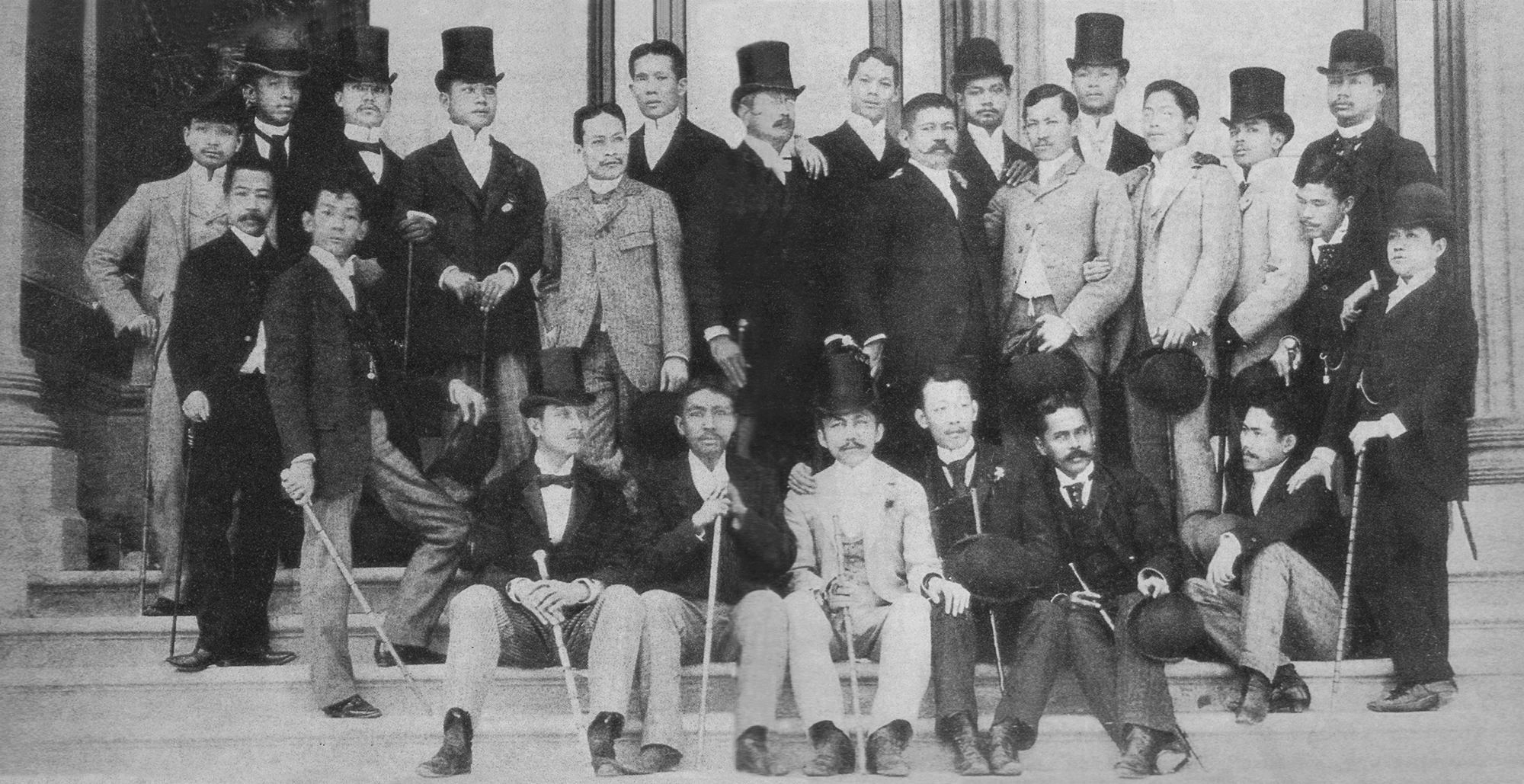
Ilustrados in Madrid, c. 1890; Standing clockwise from left: Vicente Francisco, Cajigas, José Abreu, Mariano Abella, Dominador Gómez, Francisco Tongio Liongson, Flaviano Cordecruz, a Tuazon from Malabon, Alejandro Yance de Lara, Lauro Dimayuga, Marcelo H. del Pilar, Gregorio Aguilera, José Rizal, José Alejandrino, Baldomero Roxas, Moises Salvador, Modesto Reyes, Gaudencio Juanengo, Pablo Rianzares Bautista; Seated from left: Dr. Santamaria, Candido Morada, Damaso Ponce, Ariston Bautista, Pedro Serrano Lactao, and Teodoro Sandiko

Before the start of the Philippine Revolution, Filipino society was subdivided into social classifications that were based on the economic status of a person. Background, ancestry, and economic status played a huge role in determining standing in the social hierarchy.

The Spanish people as well as native descendants of precolonial nobility belonged to the upper class, and they were further subdivided into more classes: the peninsulares, the creoles, and the Principalía. The peninsulares were people who were Spanish-born, but lived in the Philippines. The creoles, or criollo people, were Spaniards who were born in the colonies. The principalía was a hereditary class of local Indios who descended from precolonial datus, rajah and nobility, and were granted special rights and privileges such as positions in local government and the right to vote, though they were lower than the peninsulares and insulares in social standing. Many members of the Philippine Revolution belonged to the principalía class, like José Rizal. Although the peninsulares and the creoles enjoyed the same social power, as they both belonged to the upper class, the peninsulares considered themselves as socially superior to the creoles and the native principalía.

The lowest of the two classes was the masses, or Indios. This class included all poor commoners, peasants and laborers. Unlike the principalía class, where the members enjoyed high public offices and recommendations from the King of Spain, the masses only enjoyed a few civil rights and privileges. The highest political office that they could possibly hold was the gobernadorcillo, or the town executive. The members of Katipunan, the secret organization that would trigger the revolution, mainly consisted of the masses.

Material prosperity at the start of the 19th century produced an enlightened middle class in the Philippines, consisting of well-to-do farmers, teachers, lawyers, physicians, writers, and government employees. Many of them were able to buy and read books originally withheld from the lowly Filipino class. They discussed political problems and sought government reforms, and eventually, they were able to send their children to colleges and universities in Manila and abroad, particularly to Madrid. The material progress was primarily due to the opening of the Manila ports to world trade.

The leading intellectuals of the country came from the enlightened middle class. They later called themselves the Ilustrados, which means "erudite ones". They also considered themselves to be the intelligentsia branch of the Filipino society. From the Ilustrados rose the prominent members of the Propaganda Movement, who stirred the very first flames of the revolution.

==== Liberalism (1868–1874) ====
In 1868, a revolution overthrew the autocratic monarchy of Queen Isabella II of Spain, which was replaced by a civil and liberal government with Republican principles led by Francisco Serrano.

The next year, Serrano appointed Carlos María de la Torre, a member of the Spanish Army, as the 91st Governor-General of the Philippines. Filipino and Spanish liberals residing in the country welcomed him with a banquet at the Malacañan Palace on June 23, 1869. On the night of July 12, 1869, Filipino leaders, priests and students gathered and serenaded de la Torre at Malacañan Palace to express their appreciation for his liberal policies. The serenade was led by prominent residents of Manila, including José Cabezas de Herrera (the Civil Governor of Manila), José Burgos, Maximo Paterno, Manuel Genato, Joaquín Pardo de Tavera, Ángel Garchitorena, Andrés Nieto and Jacóbo Zóbel y Zangroniz.

An Assembly of Reformists, the Junta General de Reformas, was established in Manila. It consisted of five Filipinos, eleven Spanish civilians and five Spanish friars. They had the ability to vote on reforms, subject to ratification by the Home Government. However, none of the reforms were put into effect, due to the friars fearing that the reforms would diminish their influence. The Assembly ceased to exist after the 1874 Restoration.

==== Rise of Filipino nationalism ====
In 1776, the first major challenge to monarchy in centuries occurred in the American Colonies. Although the American Revolution succeeded, it was in a relatively isolated area. In 1789, however, the French Revolution began to change the political landscape of Europe, as it ended the absolute monarchy in France. The power passed from the king to the people through representation in parliament. People in other European countries began asking for representation, as well. In the Philippines, this idea spread through the writings of criollo writers, such as Luis Rodríguez Varela, who called himself "Conde Filipino" (Earl of the Philippines). This was the first time that a colonist called himself a Filipino rather than a Spanish subject. With the increasing economic and political stability in the Philippines, the middle class began demanding that the churches in the Philippines be nationalized through a process known as Secularization. In this process, control of Philippine parishes were to be passed from the religious orders to the secular priests, particularly Philippine-born priests. The religious orders, or friars, reacted negatively and a political struggle between the friars and the secular priests began.

The 19th century was also a new era for Europe. Church power was declining, and friars began coming to the Philippines, ending hopes that the friars would relinquish their posts. With the opening of the Suez Canal, the voyage between Spain and the Philippines was made shorter. More peninsulares (Spaniards born in Spain) began pouring into the colony and started to occupy the various government positions traditionally held by the criollos (Spaniards born in the Philippines). In the 300 years of colonial rule, the criollos had been accustomed to being semi-autonomous with the governor-general, who was the only Spaniard (peninsulares) government official. The criollos demanded representation in the Spanish Cortes where they could express their grievances. This, together with secularization issues, gave rise to the Criollo insurgencies.

==== Criollo insurgencies ====
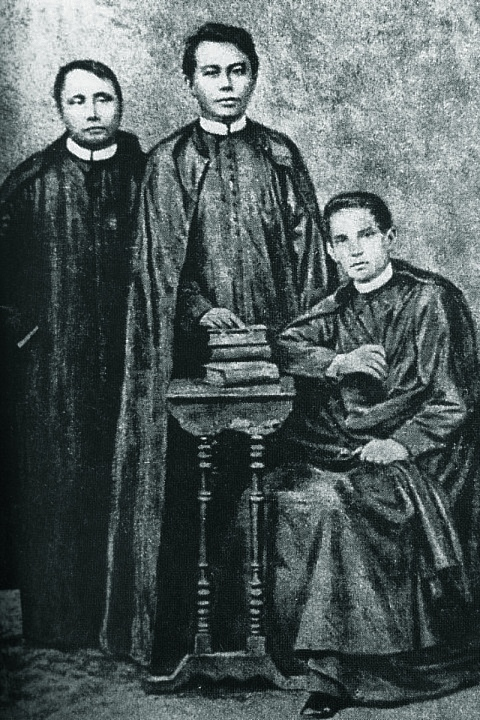
Priests Mariano Gómez, Jacinto Zamora, and José Burgos (L-R, remembered in Philippine history as Gomburza)

In the late 18th century, Criollo (or Insulares, "islanders", as they were locally called) writers began spreading the ideals of the French Revolution in the Philippines. At the same time, a royal decree ordered the secularization of Philippine churches, and many parishes were turned over to Philippine-born priests. Halfway through the process, it was aborted due to the return of the Jesuits. The religious orders began retaking Philippine parishes. One instance that enraged the Insulares was the Franciscan takeover of Antipolo, the richest parish in the islands, which had been under the control of Philippine-born priests. In the early 19th century, Fathers Pedro Peláez and Mariano Gomez began organizing activities which demanded that control of Philippine parishes be returned to the Filipino seculars. Father Peláez, who was Archbishop of the Manila Cathedral, died in an earthquake, while Father Gómez retired to private life. The next generation of Insular activists included Father José Burgos, who organized the student rallies in the University of Santo Tomas. On the political front, Insular activists included Joaquín Pardo de Tavera and Jacobo Zobel. The unrest escalated into a large insurgency in 1823 when Andres Novales, a creole captain, declared the Philippines to be independent from Spain and crowned himself Emperor of the Philippines. In January 1872, the Insular uprisings began when soldiers and workers of the Cavite Arsenal of Fort San Felipe mutinied. They were led by sergeant Ferdinand La Madrid, a Spanish mestizo. The soldiers mistook the fireworks in Quiapo, which were being fired for the feast of St. Sebastian, as the signal to start a long-planned national uprising. The colonial government used the incident to spread a reign of terror and to eliminate subversive political and church figures. Among these were priests Mariano Gomez, José Burgos, and Jacinto Zamora, who were executed by garrote on February 18, 1872. They are remembered in Philippine history as Gomburza.

== Organizations ==
=== La Solidaridad, La Liga Filipina and the Propaganda Movement ===
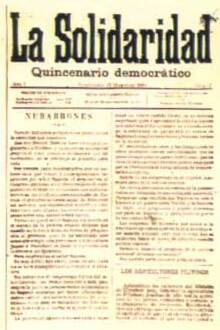
A copy of La Solidaridad (Solidarity)

The Cavite Mutiny of 1872, and the subsequent deportation of criollos and mestizos to the Mariana Islands and Europe, created a colony of Filipino expatriates in Europe, particularly in Madrid. In Madrid, Marcelo H. del Pilar, Mariano Ponce, Eduardo de Lete, and Antonio Luna founded La Solidaridad, a newspaper that pressed for reforms in the Philippines and spread ideas of revolution. This effort is known as the Propaganda Movement, and the result was the founding of secret societies in villages. Among the pioneering editors of the paper were Graciano López Jaena, Marcelo H. del Pilar, and José Rizal. The editors of La Solidaridad also included leading Spanish liberals, such as Miguel Morayta. The Propaganda Movement in Europe resulted in the Spanish legislature passing some reforms for the islands, but the colonial government did not implement them. After being published from 1889 to 1895, La Solidaridad began to run out of funds, and it had not accomplished concrete changes in the Philippines. José Rizal decided to return to the Philippines, where he founded La Liga Filipina, the Manila chapter of the Propaganda Movement.

Only days after its founding, Rizal was arrested by colonial authorities and deported to Dapitan, and the Liga was soon disbanded. Ideological differences had contributed to its dissolution. Conservative upper-class members favoring reform, under the leadership of Apolinario Mabini, set up the Cuerpo de Compromisarios, which attempted to revive La Solidaridad in Europe. Other, more radical members belonging to the middle and lower classes, led by Andrés Bonifacio, set up the Katipunan alongside the revived Liga.

The goals of the Propaganda Movement included legal equality of Filipinos and Spaniards, restoration of Philippine representation in the Spanish Cortes, "Filipinization" of the Catholic parishes, and the granting of individual liberties to Filipinos, such as freedom of speech, freedom of press, freedom of assembly, and freedom to petition for grievances.

=== Katipunan ===
Andrés Bonifacio, Deodato Arellano, Ladislao Diwa, Teodoro Plata, and Valentín Díaz founded the Katipunan (in full, Kataas-taasang, Kagalang-galangang Katipunan ng mga Anak ng Bayan, "Supreme and Venerable Society of the Children of the Nation") in Manila on July 7, 1892. The organization, advocating independence through an armed revolt against Spain, was influenced by the rituals and organization of Freemasonry; Bonifacio and other leading members were also Freemasons.

From Manila, the Katipunan expanded into several provinces, including Batangas, La Laguna (now Laguna), Cavite, Bulacan, Pampanga, Tarlac, Nueva Ecija, Ilocos Sur, Ilocos Norte, Pangasinan, Bicol, and Mindanao. Most of the members, called Katipuneros, came from the lower and middle classes. The Katipunan had "its own laws, bureaucratic structure and elective leadership". The Katipunan Supreme Council (Kataas-taasang Kapulungan, of which Bonifacio was a member, and eventually head) coordinated provincial councils (Sangguniang Bayan). The provincial councils were in charge of "public administration and military affairs on the supra-municipal or quasi-provincial level". Local councils (Panguluhang Bayan) were in charge of affairs "on the district or barrio level." By 1895, Bonifacio was the supreme leader (Supremo) or supreme president (Presidente Supremo) of the Katipunan and was the head of its Supreme Council. Some historians estimate that there were between 30,000 and 400,000 members by 1896; other historians argue that there were only a few hundred to a few thousand members.

== History ==
=== Course of the Revolution ===
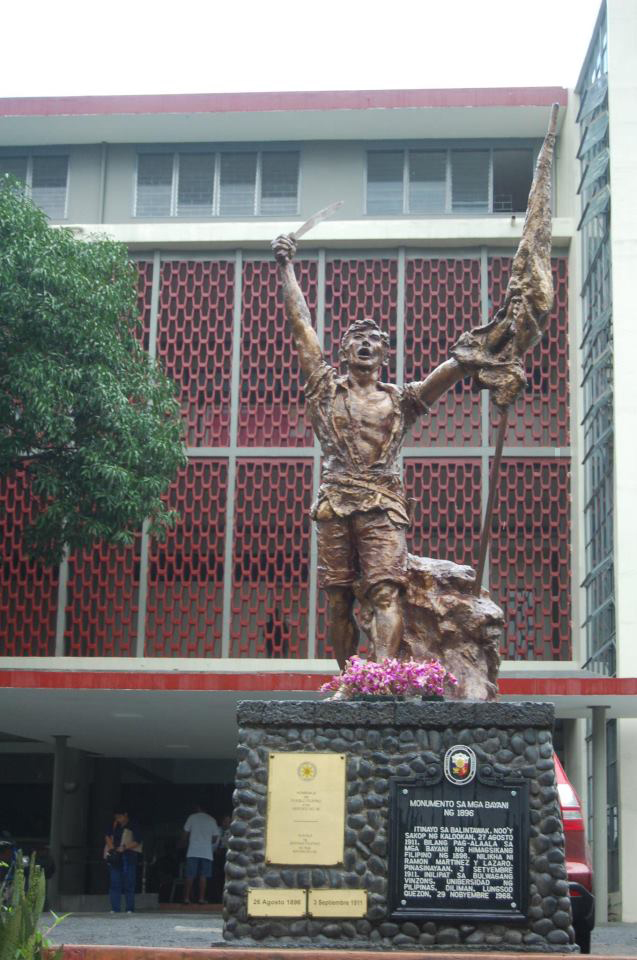
Monument for the 1896 Revolution in University of the Philippines Diliman.

The existence of the Katipunan eventually became known to the colonial authorities through Teodoro Patiño, who revealed it to the Spaniard La Font, general manager of the printing shop Diario de Manila. Patiño was engaged in a bitter dispute over pay with a co-worker, Katipunero member Apolonio de la Cruz, and exposed the Katipunan in revenge. La Font led a Spanish police lieutenant to the shop and to the desk of Apolonio, where they "found Katipunan paraphernalia such as a rubber stamp, a little book, ledgers, membership oaths signed in blood, and a membership roster of the Maghiganti chapter of the Katipunan."

A different account of the Katipunan's discovery is documented in a Guardia Civil Veterana report. It notes that Patiño disclosed information to his sister, who in turn reported it to the Mother Superior of her school. The Mother Superior brought Patiño to Friar Mariano Gil, the parish priest of Tondo, and Patiño revealed to him all he knew about the Katipunan, including the information that Katipunan material was being printed at Diario de Manila, leading the Guardia Civil to raid it. Historian Rene Escalante states that this report does not mention Apolonio de la Cruz, and that the claim that Patiño acted out of revenge is "speculative at best".

As with the Terror of 1872, colonial authorities made several arrests and used torture to identify other Katipunan members. Despite having no involvement in the secessionist movement, many of them were executed, notably Don Francisco Roxas. Bonifacio had forged their signatures in Katipunan documents, hoping that they would be forced to support the revolution.

On August 24, 1896, Bonifacio called Katipunan members to a mass gathering in Caloocan, where the group decided to start a nationwide armed revolution against Spain. The event included a mass tearing of cedulas (community tax certificates) accompanied by patriotic cries. The exact date and location are disputed, but two possibilities have been officially endorsed by the Philippine government: initially August 26 in Balintawak, and later August 23 in Pugad Lawin. Thus, the event is called the "Cry of Pugad Lawin" or "Cry of Balintawak". However, the issue is further complicated by other possible dates such as August 24 and 25 and other locations such as Kangkong, Bahay Toro and Pasong Tamo. Furthermore, at the time, "Balintawak" referred not only to a specific place, but also a general area that included some of the proposed sites, such as Kangkong.

Upon the discovery of the Katipunan, Bonifacio called all Katipunan councils to a meeting in Balintawak or Kangkong to discuss their situation. According to historian Teodoro Agoncillo, the meeting occurred on August 19; however, revolutionary leader Santiago Álvarez stated that it occurred on August 22.

On August 21, Katipuneros were already congregating in Balintawak in Caloocan. Late in the evening, amidst heavy rain, the rebels moved to Kangkong in Caloocan, and arrived there past midnight. As a precaution, the rebels moved to Bahay Toro or Pugad Lawin on August 23. Agoncillo places the Cry and tearing of certificates at the house of Juan Ramos, which was in Pugad Lawin. Alvarez writes that they met at the house of Melchora Aquino (known as "Tandang Sora", and mother of Juan Ramos) in Bahay Toro on that date. Agoncillo places Aquino's house in Pasong Tamo and the meeting there on August 24. The rebels continued to congregate, and by August 24, there were over a thousand.

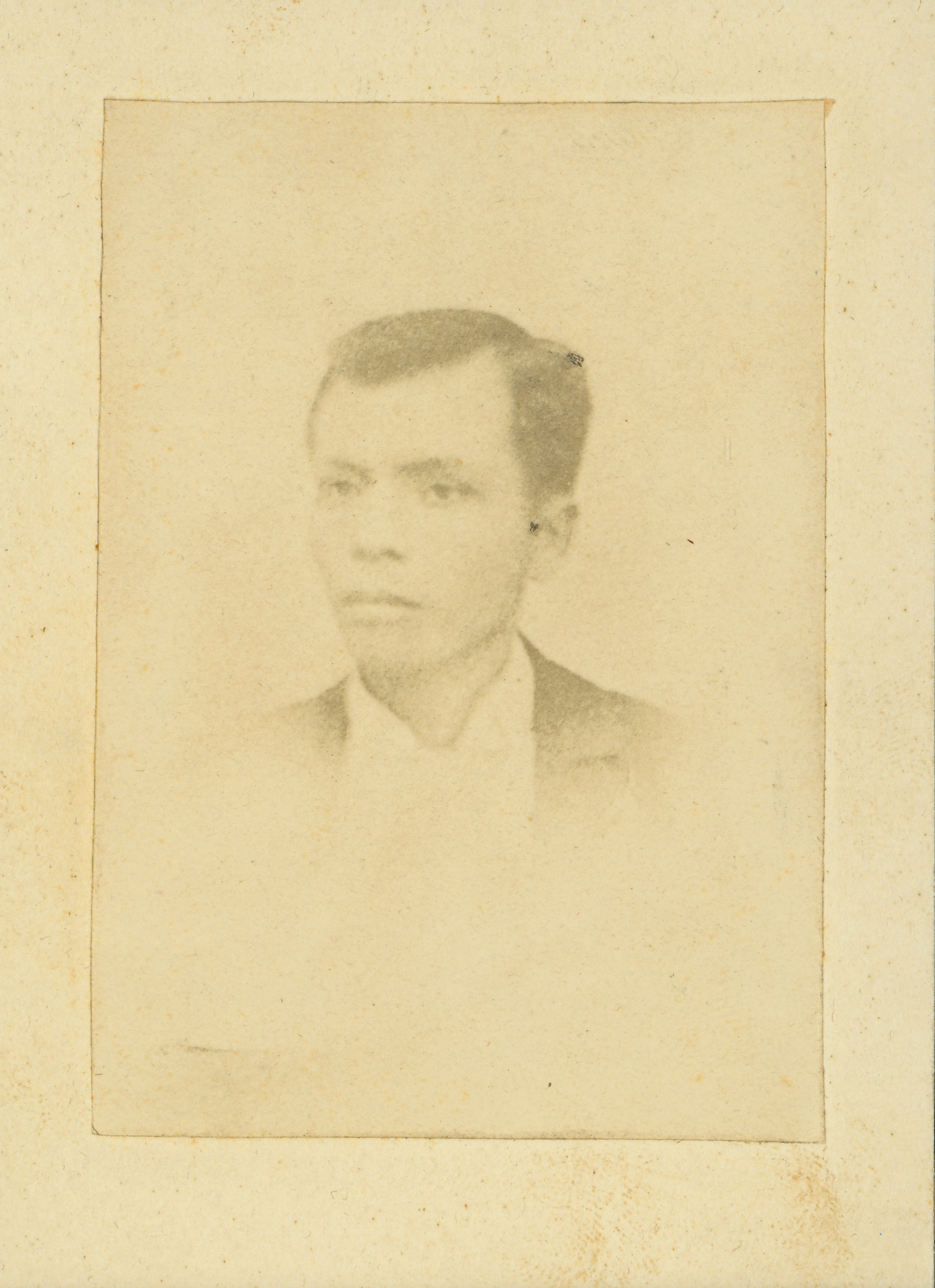
Katipunan supreme leader Andrés Bonifacio

On August 24, it was decided to notify the Katipunan councils of the surrounding towns that an attack on the capital Manila was planned for August 29. Bonifacio appointed generals to lead rebel forces in Manila. Before hostilities erupted, Bonifacio also reorganized the Katipunan into an open revolutionary government, with himself as president and the Supreme Council of the Katipunan as his cabinet.

On the morning of August 25, the rebels came under attack by a Spanish civil guard unit, with the rebels having greater numbers but the Spanish being better armed. The forces disengaged after a brief skirmish and some casualties on both sides.

Another skirmish took place on August 26, which sent the rebels retreating toward Balara. At noon, Bonifacio and some of his men briefly rested in Diliman. In the afternoon, civil guards sent to Caloocan to investigate attacks on Chinese merchants— done by bandits who had attached themselves to the rebels—came across a group of Katipuneros and briefly engaged them. The commander of the guards, Lieutenant Ros, reported the encounter to the authorities, and the report drove Governor-General Ramón Blanco to prepare for coming hostilities. General Blanco had about 10,000 Spanish regulars and the gunboats Isla de Cuba and Isla de Luzon by the end of November.

From August 27 to 28, Bonifacio moved from Balara to Mt. Balabak in Hagdang Bato, Mandaluyong. There, he held meetings to finalize plans for the Manila attack the following day. Bonifacio issued the following general proclamation:

This manifesto is for all of you. It is absolutely necessary for us to stop at the earliest possible time the nameless oppositions being perpetrated on the sons of the country who are now suffering the brutal punishment and tortures in jails, and because of this please let all the brethren know that on Saturday, the 29th of the current month, the revolution shall commence according to our agreement. For this purpose, it is necessary for all towns to rise simultaneously and attack Manila at the same time. Anybody who obstructs this sacred ideal of the people will be considered a traitor and an enemy, except if he is ill; or is not physically fit, in which case he shall be tried according to the regulations we have put in force. Mount of Liberty, 28 August 1896 – ANDRÉS BONIFACIO

The conventional view among Filipino historians is that Bonifacio did not carry out the planned Katipunan attack on Manila the following day and instead attacked a powder magazine at San Juan del Monte. However, more recent studies have advanced the view that the planned attack did occur; according to this view, Bonifacio's battle at San Juan del Monte (now called the "Battle of Pinaglabanan") was only a part of a bigger "battle for Manila" hitherto unrecognized as such.

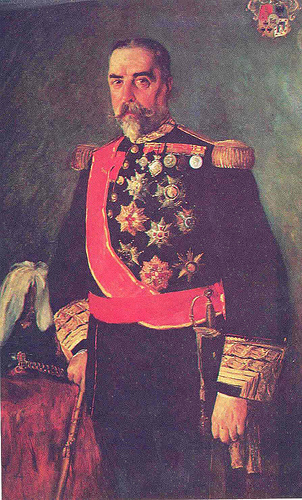
Portrait of Governor-General of the Philippines Ramón Blanco y Erenas by Filipino painter Juan Luna.

Hostilities in the area started on the evening of August 29, when hundreds of rebels attacked the Civil Guard garrison in Pasig, just as hundreds of other rebels personally led by Bonifacio were amassing in San Juan del Monte, which they attacked at about 4 a.m. on the 30th. Bonifacio planned to capture the San Juan del Monte powder magazine along with a water station which supplied Manila. The Spaniards, outnumbered, fought a delaying battle until reinforcements arrived. Once reinforced, the Spaniards drove Bonifacio's forces back with heavy casualties. Elsewhere, rebels attacked Mandaluyong, Sampaloc, Sta. Ana, Pandacan, Pateros, Marikina, and Caloocan, as well as Makati and Taguig. Balintawak in Caloocan saw intense fighting. Rebel troops tended to gravitate towards fighting in San Juan del Monte and Sampaloc. South of Manila, a thousand-strong rebel force attacked a small force of civil guards. In Pandacan, Katipuneros attacked the parish church, making the parish priest run for his life.

After their defeat in Battle of San Juan del Monte, Bonifacio's troops regrouped near Marikina, San Mateo and Montalban, where they proceeded to attack these areas. They captured the areas, but were driven back by Spanish counterattacks, and Bonifacio eventually ordered a retreat to Balara. On the way, Bonifacio was nearly killed shielding Emilio Jacinto from a Spanish bullet that grazed his collar. Despite his retreat, Bonifacio was not completely defeated and was still considered to be a threat.

South of Manila, the towns of San Francisco de Malabon, Noveleta and Kawit in Cavite rebelled a few days after. In Nueva Ecija, north of Manila, rebels in San Isidro, led by Mariano Llanera, attacked the Spanish garrison on September 2–4, but they were repulsed.

By August 30, the revolt had spread to eight provinces. On that date, Governor-General Ramón Blanco declared a "state of war" in these provinces and placed them under martial law. These provinces were Manila, Bulacan, Cavite, Pampanga, Tarlac, La Laguna, Batangas, and Nueva Ecija. They would later be represented as the eight rays of the sun in the Filipino flag. Additionally, due to the scant military resources Spain had in the Philippines, the governor called for the participation of civilians in the defence of Spanish sovereignty and established the Loyal Volunteers' Battalion in Manila, following the example of similar units created in Cuba and Puerto Rico between the 1850s and the 1860s. More similar units were created in Manila and other areas under Spanish control.

The rebels had few firearms; they were mostly armed with bolo knives and bamboo spears. The lack of guns has been proposed as a possible reason why the Manila attack allegedly never succeeded. Also, the Katipunan leaders from Cavite had earlier expressed reservations about starting an uprising due to their lack of firearms and preparation. As a result, they did not send troops to Manila, but instead attacked garrisons in their own locales. Some historians have argued that the Katipunan defeat in the Manila area was (partly) the fault of the Cavite rebels due to their absence, as their presence would have proved crucial. In their memoirs, Cavite rebel leaders justified their absence in Manila by claiming Bonifacio failed to execute pre-arranged signals to begin the uprising, such as setting balloons loose and extinguishing the lights at the Luneta park. However, these claims have been dismissed as "historical mythology"; as reasoned by historians, if they were really waiting for signals before marching on Manila, they would have arrived "too late for the fray". Bonifacio's command for a simultaneous attack is interpreted as evidence that such signals were never arranged. Other factors for the Katipunan defeat include the capture of Bonifacio's battle plans by Spanish intelligence. The Spanish concentrated their forces in the Manila area while pulling out troops in other provinces (which proved beneficial for rebels in other areas, particularly Cavite). The authorities also transferred a regiment of 500 native troops to Marawi, Mindanao, where the soldiers later rebelled.

==== Final statement and execution of José Rizal ====
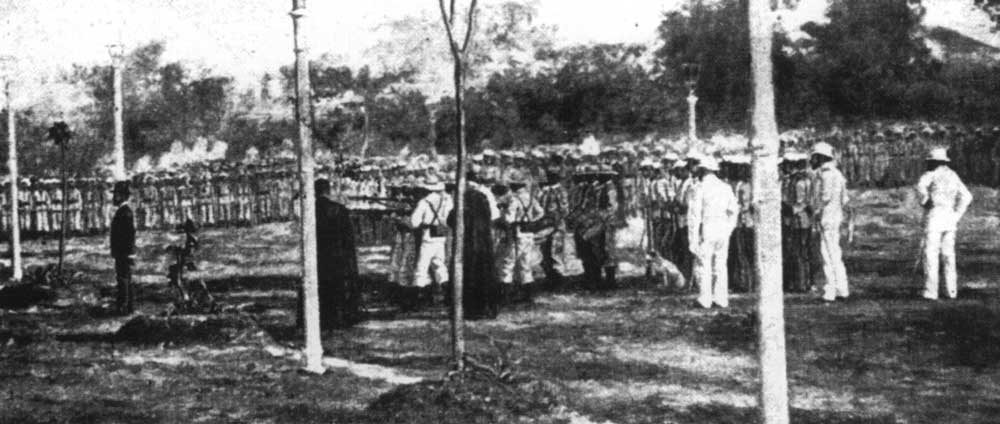
Rizal's execution in what was then Bagumbayan.

When the revolution broke out, Rizal was in Cavite, awaiting the monthly mailboat to Spain. He had volunteered, and been accepted, for medical service in the Spanish Army fighting in Cuba. The mailboat left on September 3 and arrived in Barcelona, which was under martial law, on October 3, 1896. After a brief confinement at Montjuich prison, Rizal was told by Captain-General Eulogio Despujol that he would not be going on to Cuba, but would be sent back to the Philippines instead. Upon his return, he was imprisoned in Fort Santiago.

While incarcerated, Rizal petitioned Governor-General Ramón Blanco for permission to make a statement on the rebellion. His petition was granted, and Rizal wrote the Manifesto á Algunos Filipinos, wherein he decried the use of his name "as a war-cry among certain people who were up in arms", stated that "for reforms to bear fruit, they must come from above, since those that come from below will be irregular and uncertain shocks", and affirmed that he "condemn[s], this absurd, savage insurrection". However, the text was suppressed on the recommendation of the Judge-Advocate General.

==== Revolution in Cavite ====
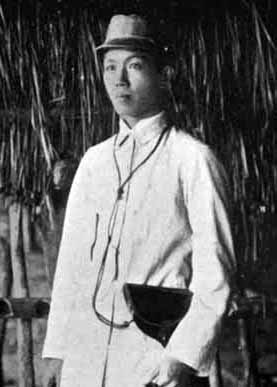
Emilio Aguinaldo as a Generalissimo in the battlefield.

By December, there were three major centers of rebellion: Cavite (under Emilio Aguinaldo), Bulacan (under Mariano Llanera) and Morong (now part of Rizal, under Bonifacio). Bonifacio served as tactician for the rebel guerillas, though his prestige suffered when he lost battles that he personally led.

Meanwhile, in Cavite, Katipuneros under Mariano Álvarez, Bonifacio's uncle by marriage, and Baldomero Aguinaldo of Cavite El Viejo (modern Kawit), won early victories. The Magdalo council commissioned Edilberto Evangelista, an engineer, to plan the defense and logistics of the revolution in Cavite. His first victory was in the Battle of Imus on September 1, 1896, defeating the Spanish forces under General Ernesto Aguirre with the aid of Jose Tagle. The Cavite revolutionaries, particularly Emilio Aguinaldo, won prestige through defeating Spanish troops in "set piece" battles, while other rebels like Bonifacio and Llanera were engaged in guerrilla warfare. Aguinaldo, speaking for the Magdalo ruling council, issued a manifesto proclaiming a provisional and revolutionary government after his early successes, despite the existence of Bonifacio's Katipunan government.

The Katipunan in Cavite was divided into two councils: the Magdiwang (led by Alvarez) and the Magdalo (led by Baldomero Aguinaldo, Emilio's cousin). At first, these two Katipunan councils cooperated with each other in the battlefield, as in the battles of Binakayan and Dalahican, where they won their first major victory over the Spaniards. However, rivalries between command and territory soon developed, and they refused to cooperate with each other in battle.

To unite the Katipunan in Cavite, the Magdiwang, through Artemio Ricarte and Pío del Pilar, called Bonifacio, who was fighting in Morong (present-day Rizal) province to mediate between the factions. Perhaps due to his kinship ties with their leader, Bonifacio was seen as partial to the Magdiwang.

It was not long before the issue of leadership was debated. The Magdiwang faction recognized Bonifacio as supreme leader, being the head of the Katipunan. The Magdalo faction agitated for Emilio Aguinaldo to be the movement's head because of his successes in the battlefield compared to Bonifacio's record of personal defeats. Meanwhile, the Spanish troops, now under the command of the new Governor-General Camilo de Polavieja, steadily gained ground.

==== Tejeros Convention ====
On December 31, an assembly was convened in Imus to settle the leadership dispute. The Magdalo insisted on the establishment of revolutionary government to replace the Katipunan. The Magdiwang favored retention of the Katipunan, arguing that it was already a government in itself. The assembly dispersed without a consensus.

On March 22, 1897, another meeting was held in Tejeros. It called for the election of officers for the revolutionary government, which was in need of united military forces, as there was a pending Spanish offensive against the Magdalo faction. The Magdiwang faction allied with Bonifacio and prepared and hosted the election, as most of the Magdalo faction was occupied by battle preparations. Bonifacio chaired the election and stated that the election results were to be respected. When the voting ended, Bonifacio had lost and the leadership turned over to Aguinaldo, who was away fighting in Pasong Santol. Bonifacio also lost other positions to members of his Magdiwang faction. Instead, he was elected as Director of the Interior, but his qualifications were questioned by a Magdalo, Daniel Tirona. Bonifacio felt insulted and would have shot Tirona if Artemio Ricarte had not intervened. Invoking his position of Supremo of the Katipunan, Bonifacio declared the election void and stomped out in anger. Aguinaldo took his oath of office as president the next day in Santa Cruz de Malabon (present-day Tanza) in Cavite, as did the rest of the officers, except for Bonifacio. Bonifacio repudiated the election results and moved his headquarters to Naic where he and other signatories issued the Acta de Tejeros, essentially resolving to establish a government separate from the one established at Tejeros.

==== Execution of Bonifacio ====
When Limbon in Indang, a town in Cavite, refused to supply provisions, Bonifacio ordered it to be burned. When Aguinaldo learned about the Naic Military Agreement and the reports of abuse, he ordered the arrest of Bonifacio and his soldiers (without Bonifacio's knowledge) on April 27, 1897. Colonel Agapito Bonzon met with Bonifacio in Limbon and attacked him the next day. Bonifacio and his brother Procopio were wounded, while their brother Ciriaco was killed on April 28. They were taken to Naic to stand trial.

The Consejo de Guerra (War Council) sentenced Andrés and Procopio to death on May 10, 1897, for committing sedition and treason. Aguinaldo supported the deportation of Andrés and Procopio rather than execution, but withdrew his decision as a result of pressure from Pío del Pilar and other officers of the revolution.

On May 10, Major Lázaro Makapagal, upon orders from General Mariano Noriel, executed the Bonifacio brothers at the foothills of Mount Buntis, near Maragondon. Andrés and Procopio were buried in a shallow grave, marked only with twigs.

==== The Battle of Kakarong de Sili ====
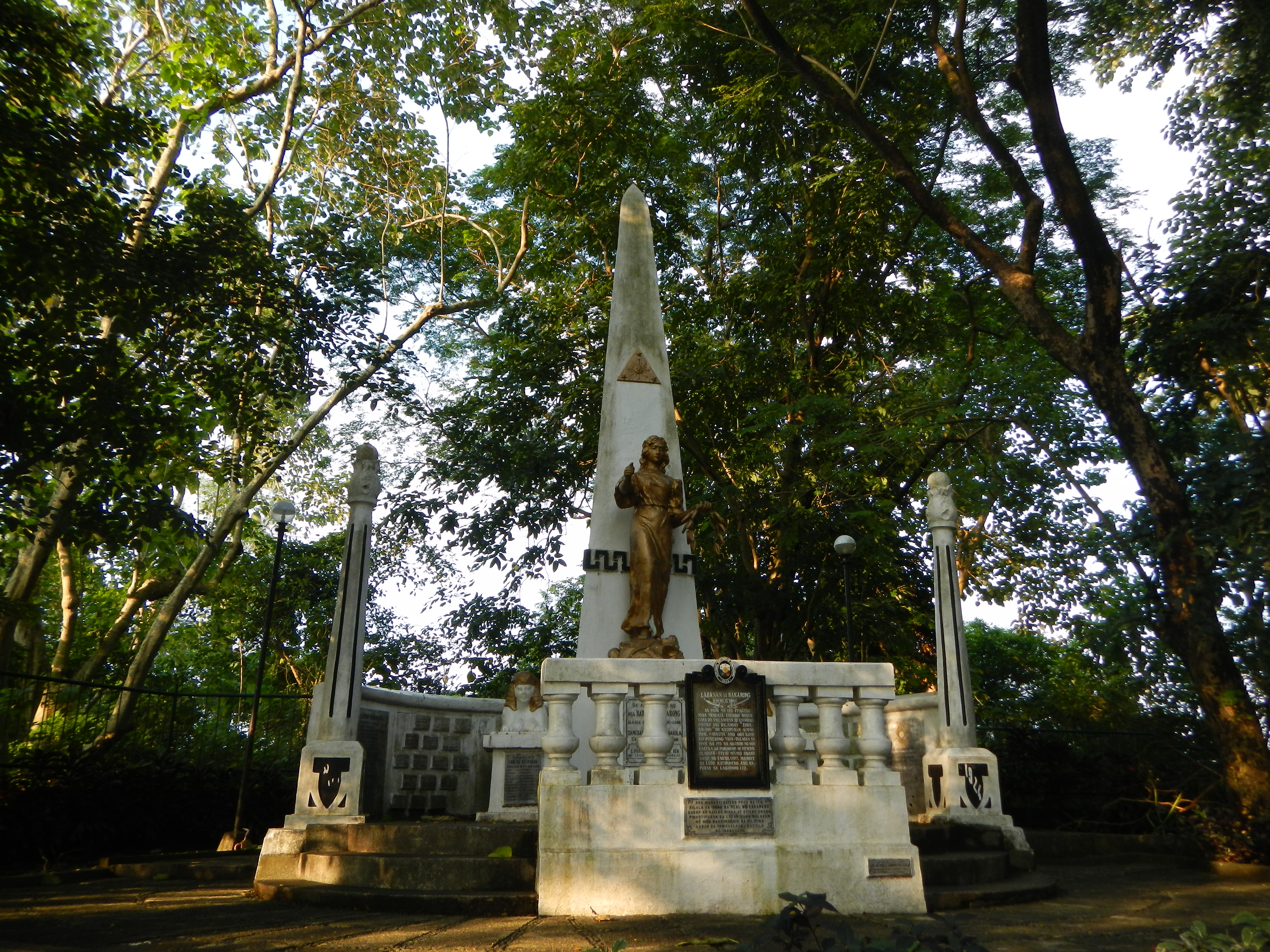
Inang Filipina Shrine

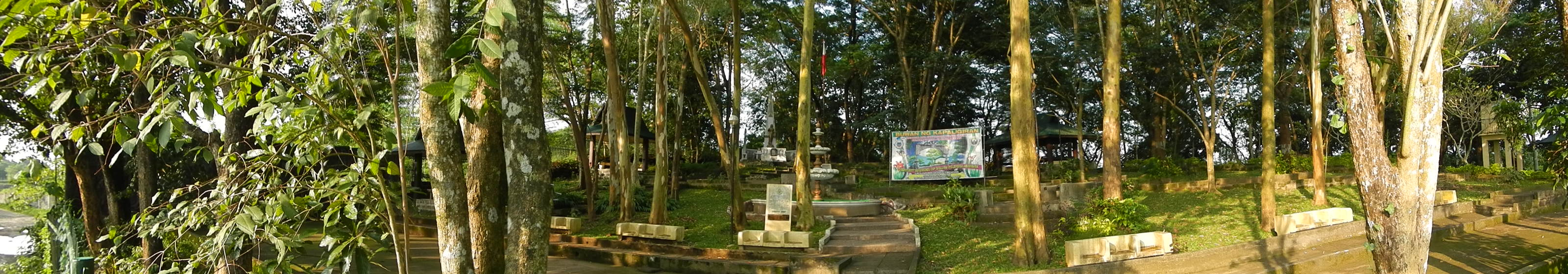
Panorama of the Park and the Shrine

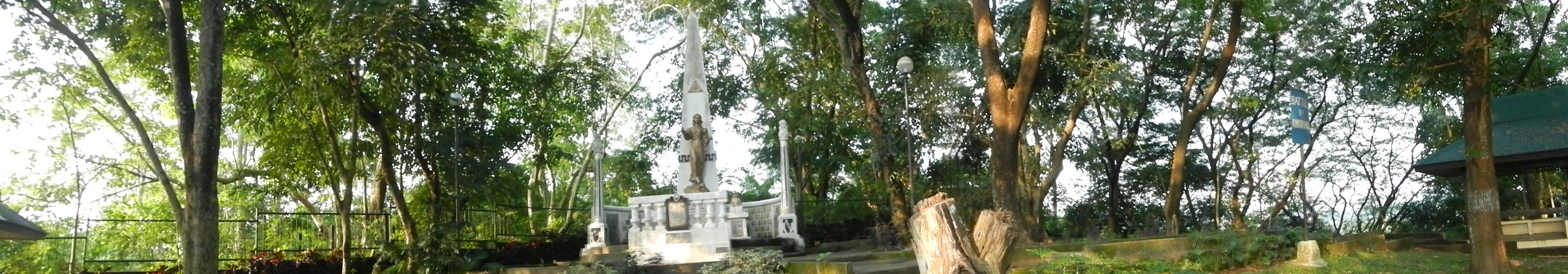
Facade

The battle of Kakarong de Sili took place on January 1, 1897. Pandi, Bulacan, played a vital and historical role in the fight for Philippine independence. Pandi is historically known for the Real de Kakarong de Sili Shrine – Inang Filipina Shrine, the site where the bloodiest revolution in Bulacan took place, where more than 3,000 Katipunero revolutionaries died. Likewise, it is on this site where the 'Republic of Real de Kakarong de Sili' of 1896, one of the first Philippine revolutionary republics, was established. It was also in Kakarong de Sili that the Kakarong Republic was organized shortly after the Cry of Pugad Lawin by about 6,000 Katipuneros from various towns of Bulacan, headed by Brigadier General Eusebio Roque (better known as "Maestrong Sebio or Dimabungo").

==== Kakarong Republic ====
History and researchers, as well as records of the National Historical Commission tell that the Kakarong Republic was the first truly organized revolutionary government established in the country to overthrow the Spaniards, antedating even the famous Malolos Republic and the Biak-na-Bato Republic. In recognition thereof, these three "Republics" established in Bulacan have been incorporated in the provincial seal. The Kakarong Republic, established in late 1896, grew out of the local Katipunan chapter in the town of Pandi, Bulacan, called the Balangay Dimas-Alang.

According to available records, including the biography of General Gregorio del Pilar, entitled "Life and Death of a Boy General" (written by Teodoro Kalaw, former director of the National Library of the Philippines), a fort was constructed at Kakarong de Sili that was like a miniature city. It had streets, an independent police force, a military band, a military arsenal with factories for bolos and artillery, and repair shops for rifles and cartridges. The Kakarong Republic had a complete set of officials, with Canuto Villanueva as Supreme Chief and Captain General of the military forces, and Eusebio Roque, also known by his nom-de-guerre "Maestrong Sebio", then head of the Katipunan local organization, as Brigadier General of the Army of the Republic. The fort was attacked and completely destroyed on January 1, 1897, by a large Spanish force headed by General José Olaguer Feliú. General Gregorio del Pilar was only a lieutenant at that time, and the Battle of Kakarong de Sili was his first "baptism of fire". This was where he was first wounded and escaped to Manatal, a nearby barangay.

In memory of the 1,200 Katipuneros who perished in the battle, the Kakarong Lodge No. 168 of the Legionarios del Trabajo erected a monument of the Inang Filipina Shrine (Mother Philippines Shrine) in 1924 in the barrio of Kakarong in Pandi, Bulacan. The actual site of the Battle of Kakarong de Sili is now a part of the barangay of Real de Kakarong. Emilio Aguinaldo visited this ground in his late fifties.

==== Biak-na-Bato ====
The flag used by the Republic of Biak-na-Bato.

Augmented by new recruits from Spain, government troops recaptured several towns in Cavite, taking Imus on March 25, 1897. The head of the Spanish expeditionary force, General José de Lacambre, then offered amnesty to all who would surrender and accept Spanish authority. In May 1897, the Spanish captured Maragondon, forcing the Government of the Philippine Republic to move to Mt. Buntis. By June, the Spanish had taken Mendez Nunez, Amadeo, Alfonso, Bailen and Magallanes with little resistance. The Spanish planned war, including the concentration of rebel relatives and friends in camps.

As argued by Apolinario Mabini and others, the succession of defeats for the rebels could be attributed to discontent that resulted from Andrés Bonifacio's death. Mabini wrote:

This tragedy smothered the enthusiasm for the revolutionary cause, and hastened the failure of the insurrection in Cavite, because many from Manila, La Laguna and Batangas, who were fighting for the province (of Cavite), were demoralized and quit...

In other areas, some of Bonifacio's associates, such as Emilio Jacinto and Macario Sakay, never subjected their military commands to Emilio Aguinaldo's authority.

Aguinaldo and his men retreated northward, from one town to the next, until they finally settled in Biak-na-Bato, in the town of San Miguel de Mayumo in Bulacan. Here they established what became known as the Republic of Biak-na-Bato, with a constitution drafted by Isabelo Artacho and Felix Ferrer, based on the first Cuban Constitution.

The new Spanish Governor-General Fernando Primo de Rivera, declaring "I can take Biak-na-Bato. Any army can capture it. But I cannot end the rebellion", proffered peace to the revolutionaries. A lawyer named Pedro Paterno volunteered to be negotiator between the two sides. For four months, he travelled between Manila and Biak-na-Bato. His hard work finally bore fruit when, on December 14 to 15, 1897, the Pact of Biak-na-Bato was signed. Consisting of three documents, it called for the following agenda:

- The surrender of all weapons of the revolutionaries.
- Amnesty for those who participated in the revolution.
- Exile for the revolutionary leadership.
- Payment by the Spanish government of $400,000 (Mexican peso) to the revolutionaries in three installments: $200,000 (Mexican peso) upon leaving the country, $100,000 (Mexican peso) upon the surrender of at least 700 firearms, and another $200,000 (Mexican peso) upon the declaration of general amnesty.

Aguinaldo and eighteen other top officials of the revolution, including Mariano Llanera, Tomás Mascardo, Benito Natividad, Gregorio del Pilar, and Vicente Lukban left Biak-na-Bato on December 24, 1897, for exile in Hong Kong.

==== Women in the revolution ====
Women served in many roles in the revolution such as messengers, nurses, soldiers, fund-raisers, and provisioners. Teresa Magbanua was a fighter and military leader who defeated a Spanish detachment at Sapong. Trinidad Tecson fought in battles in Bulacan and later became a nurse at Biak-na-Bato. The flag raised at the founding of the revolutionary government in Santa Barbara, Iloilo, was sewn by several women, including Patrocinio Gamboa, who also carried out intelligence missions throughout the revolution. The 84-year-old store owner Melchora Aquino hid, fed, and nursed members of the Katipunan in Balintawak, and within a month of the outbreak, she was arrested and exiled to Guam.

==== Second Phase of the revolution ====
===== In the Philippines =====
Not all revolutionary generals complied with the treaty. One, General Francisco Macabulos, established a Central Executive Committee to serve as the interim government until a more suitable one was created. Armed conflicts resumed, this time coming from almost every province in the Philippines. The colonial authorities, on the other hand, continued the arrest and torture of those suspected of committing banditry.

===== In exile =====
Aguinaldo and his party arrived in Hong Kong with MXN$400,000. (Note: The funds were denominated in Mexican dollars, which were worth at the time to about 50 US cents — equivalent to about $19.35 today.) The funds were deposited in bank account controlled by Aguinaldo. The exiles were convinced that the Spaniards would never give the rest of the money promised. After their arrival, Isabelo Artacho, a revolutionary who had not been exiled, arrived in Hong Kong and demanded the funds as payment for his services, threatening legal action which would tie up the funds. On advice from Felipe Agoncillo, Aguinaldo and two aides fled under false names to Europe with a stop-over in Singapore. In Singapore, Aguinaldo met clandestinely with U.S. Consul E. Spencer Pratt, who learned that war had been declared between the U.S. and Spain.

===== Return to the Philippines =====
Upon returning to Hong Kong and learning that Commodore George Dewey had already sailed for Manila, Aguinaldo met with U.S. Consul Rounseville Wildman, who informed him that Dewey had left instructions to arrange his return to the Philippines. Wildman advised Aguinaldo to establish a dictatorial government upon his return to prosecute the war against Spain, followed by a government modeled after the United States once peace was restored. Preparatory to his departure, Aguinaldo entrusted Wildman with ₱50,000 to purchase 2,000 rifles and 200,000 rounds of ammunition, and later gave him an additional ₱67,000 for a second arms shipment. While the first shipment was delivered, the second shipment was never realized, nor did Wildman return or account for the ₱67,000.

Following Dewey's victory at Manila Bay, the Hong Kong Junta convened on May 4, 1898, to deliberate on their next course of action. Present at the meeting were temporary president Felipe Agoncillo, temporary secretary Doroteo Lopez, Teodoro Sandico, Anastacio Francisco, Mariano Llanera, Miguel Malvar, Andres Garchitorena, Severo Buenaventura, Maximo Kabigting, Faustino Lichauco, and Antonio Montenegro. After Aguinaldo and Galicano Apacible entered the session hall and Aguinaldo recounted his discussions with Pratt and Wildman, the Junta unanimously decided that Aguinaldo should return to the Philippines to lead the renewed struggle against Spain.

Although the American revenue cutter USS McCulloch initially arrived in Hong Kong on May 7 without orders to transport him, Dewey subsequently instructed its captain to bring Aguinaldo aboard on the vessel's second return. Following Wildman's suggestion to board at night to avoid alerting the Spanish consul, Aguinaldo and his companions departed Hong Kong on May 17 at 11:00 a.m. and arrived in Cavite on May 19, 1898. Shortly after arriving, Aguinaldo met Dewey aboard the flagship USS Olympia, where he was accorded the honors of a general. Aguinaldo later claimed that Dewey assured him the United States desired no colonies and would recognize Philippine independence, though Dewey denied making any official commitment on behalf of the U.S. government.

===== Renewal of the Struggle =====
After unloading the war materials brought from Hong Kong, Aguinaldo distributed proclamations to insurgents from Bataan urging Filipinos to rally once more against Spanish rule. As news of his return spread across Central Luzon, Filipino volunteers serving in the Spanish colonial army defected to the revolutionary forces. Aguinaldo ordered them to occupy Dalahikan, the Cavite shipyard, to deny it to the Spanish, while additional arms were secured from the captain of the American gunboat USS Petrel and distributed to incoming recruits. On May 21, 1898, Aguinaldo issued a proclamation calling for a coordinated uprising at noon on May 31, instructing towns such as Salinas (Rosario), Noveleta, Naic, Tanza, Cauit, Bacoor, Las Piñas, and Parañaque to mobilize and pursue retreating Spanish forces.

By the end of May 1898, Aguinaldo's forces had captured approximately 5,000 Spanish prisoners and retaken Imus, Parañaque, Bacoor, and Las Piñas within a week. In Pampanga, revolutionary forces captured San Fernando and Macabebe, forcing Spanish General Monet to flee. Provinces including Laguna, Batangas, Bulacan, Nueva Ecija, Bataan, Tayabas, and Camarines rose in revolt and declared loyalty to Aguinaldo. By June 1898, nearly all of Luzon—with the exception of the port of Cavite and the walled city of Manila—was under Filipino control.

=== Spanish–American War ===
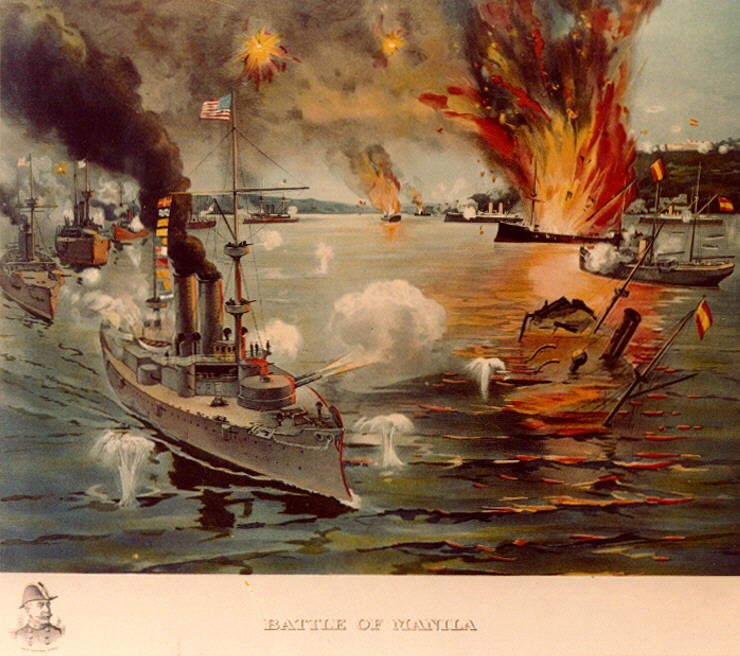
Battle of Manila Bay.

The failure of Spain to engage in active social reforms in Cuba as demanded by the United States government was the basic cause for the Spanish–American War. American attention was focused on the issue after the mysterious explosion that sank the American battleship Maine on February 15, 1898, in Havana Harbor. As public political pressure from the Democratic Party and certain industrialists built up for war, the U.S. Congress forced the reluctant Republican president William McKinley to issue an ultimatum to Spain on April 19, 1898. Spain found it had no diplomatic support in Europe, but nevertheless declared war; the U.S. followed on April 25 with its own declaration of war.

Theodore Roosevelt, who was at that time Assistant Secretary of the Navy, ordered Commodore George Dewey, commanding the Asiatic Squadron of the United States Navy: "Order the squadron ...to Hong Kong. Keep full of coal. In the event of declaration of war Spain, your duty will be to see that the Spanish squadron does not leave the Asiatic coast, and then offensive operations in Philippine Islands." Dewey's squadron departed on April 27 for the Philippines, reaching Manila Bay on the evening of April 30.

On April 27, Commodore George Dewey sailed for Manila with a fleet of nine U.S. ships. Upon arriving on May 1, Dewey encountered a fleet of nine Spanish ships commanded by Admiral Patricio Montojo. The subsequent Battle of Manila Bay only lasted for a few hours, and ended with no loss of life among the American forces. While the naval victory was decisive, the small fleet lacked the numbers needed to capture Manila. The U.S. squadron took control of the arsenal and navy yard at Cavite. Dewey cabled Washington, stating that although he controlled Manila Bay, he needed 5,000 additional men to seize Manila itself. The fleet remained in Manila Bay while reinforcements were sent from the United States.

==== Preparation for land-based operations and Aguinaldo's return ====
The unexpected rapidity and completeness of Dewey's victory in the first engagement of the war prompted the McKinley administration to make the decision to capture Manila from the Spanish. The United States Army began to assemble the Eighth Army Corps—a military unit which would consist of 10,844 soldiers under the command of Major General Wesley Merritt—in preparation for deployment to the Philippines.

On May 7, 1898, USS McCulloch, an American dispatch boat, arrived in Hong Kong from Manila, bringing reports of Dewey's victory in the Battle of Manila Bay. Emilio Aguinaldo had recently returned there from Singapore expecting to be transported to Manila by the Americans, but McCulloch had no orders regarding this. McCulloch again arrived in Hong Kong on May 15 bearing such orders and departed Hong Kong with Aguinaldo aboard on May 17, arriving in Manila Bay on May 19. Several revolutionaries, as well as Filipino soldiers employed by the Spanish army, crossed over to Aguinaldo's command.

Aguinaldo arrived on May 19 and, after a brief meeting with Dewey, resumed revolutionary activities against the Spanish. On May 24, Aguinaldo issued a proclamation in which he assumed command of all Philippine forces and announced his intention to establish a dictatorial government with himself as dictator, saying that he would resign in favor of a duly elected president.

In the Battle of Alapan on May 28, 1898, Aguinaldo raided the last remaining stronghold of the Spanish Empire in Cavite with fresh reinforcements of about 12,000 men. This battle eventually liberated Cavite from Spanish colonial control and led to the first time the modern flag of the Philippines being unfurled in victory.

Public jubilation marked Aguinaldo's return. Many Filipino enlisted men deserted local Spanish army units to join Aguinaldo's command and the Philippine Revolution against Spain resumed. Soon, many towns such as Imus, Bacoor, Parañaque, Las Piñas, Morong, Macabebe and San Fernando, as well as some entire provinces such as La Laguna (now Laguna), Batangas, Bulacan, Nueva Ecija, Bataan, Tayabas (now Quezon), and the Camarines provinces, were liberated by the Filipinos and the port of Dalahican in Cavite was secured.

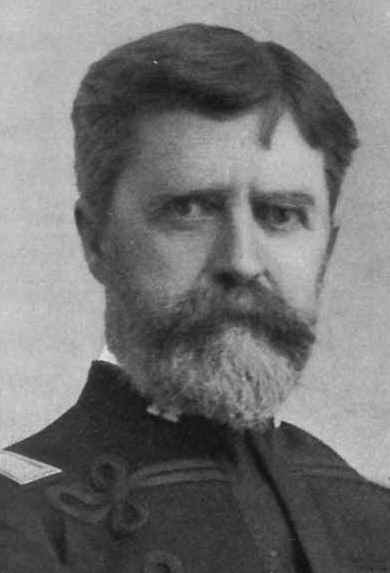
Thomas M. Anderson

The first contingent of American troops arrived on June 30 under the command of Brigadier General Thomas McArthur Anderson, commander of the Eighth Corps' 2nd Division (U.S. brigade and division numbers of the era were not unique throughout the army). General Anderson wrote to Aguinaldo, requesting his cooperation in military operations against the Spanish forces. Aguinaldo responded, thanking General Anderson for his amicable sentiments, but saying nothing about military cooperation. General Anderson did not renew the request.

The 2nd Brigade and the 2nd Division of the Eighth Corps arrived on July 17, under the command of Brigadier General Francis V. Greene. Major General Wesley Merritt (the Commander in Chief of the Philippine Expedition) and his staff arrived at Cavite on July 25. The 1st Brigade of the corps' 2nd Division arrived on July 30, under the command of Brigadier General Arthur MacArthur.

==== Declaration of Independence ====
By June 1898, the island of Luzon, except for Manila and the port of Cavite, was under Filipino control, after General Monet's retreat to Manila with his remaining force of 600 men and 80 wounded. The revolutionaries were laying siege to Manila and cutting off its food and water supply. With most of the archipelago under his control, Aguinaldo decided it was time to establish a Philippine government. When Aguinaldo arrived from Hong Kong, he had brought with him a copy of a plan drawn by Mariano Ponce, calling for the establishment of a revolutionary government. Upon the advice of Ambrosio Rianzares Bautista, however, an autocratic regime was established on May 24, with Aguinaldo as dictator.

It was under this dictatorship On June 12, 1898, Aguinaldo proclaimed the independence of the Philippines at his house in Cavite El Viejo. Ambrosio Rianzares Bautista wrote the Philippine Declaration of Independence, and read this document in Spanish that day at Aguinaldo's house. The first Filipino flag was again unfurled and the national anthem was played for the first time. On June 18, Aguinaldo issued a decree formally establishing his dictatorial government. Apolinario Mabini, Aguinaldo's closest adviser, opposed Aguinaldo's decision to establish an autocracy. He instead urged Aguinaldo to create a revolutionary government. Aguinaldo refused to do so; however, Mabini was eventually able to convince him. On June 23, Aguinaldo issued another decree, this time replacing the dictatorial government with a revolutionary government (and naming himself as president).

Writing retrospectively in 1899, Aguinaldo claimed that U.S. Consul E. Spencer Pratt had verbally assured him that "the United States would at least recognize the independence of the Philippines under the protection of the United States Navy". In an April 28 message from Pratt to U.S. Secretary of State William R. Day, there was no mention of independence, or of any conditions on which Aguinaldo was to cooperate. In a July 28 communication, Pratt stated that no promises had been made to Aguinaldo regarding U.S. policy, with the concept aimed at facilitating the occupation and administration of the Philippines, while preventing a possible conflict of action. On June 16, Day cabled Pratt with instructions to avoid unauthorized negotiations, along with a reminder that Pratt had no authority to enter into arrangements on behalf of the U.S. government. Filipino scholar Maximo Kalaw wrote in 1927: "A few of the principal facts, however, seem quite clear. Aguinaldo was not made to understand that, in consideration of Filipino cooperation, the United States would extend its sovereignty over the Islands, and thus in place of the old Spanish master a new one would step in. The truth was that nobody at the time ever thought that the end of the war would result in the retention of the Philippines by the United States."

On July 15, Aguinaldo issued three organic decrees assuming civil authority of the Philippines. American generals suspected Aguinaldo was attempting to take Manila without American assistance, had restricted supplies to American forces, and was secretly negotiating with Spanish authorities while informing them of American troop movements. Aguinaldo warned that American troops should not disembark in places conquered by the Filipinos without first communicating in writing, and did not offer his full service to arriving American forces.

==== Capture of Manila ====
By June, U.S. and Filipino forces had taken control of most of the islands, except for the walled city of Intramuros. Admiral Dewey and General Merritt were able to work out a bloodless solution with acting governor-general Fermín Jáudenes. The negotiating parties made a secret agreement to stage a mock battle in which the Spanish forces would be defeated by the American forces, but the Filipino forces would not be allowed to enter the city. This plan minimized the risk of unnecessary casualties on all sides, while the Spanish would also avoid the shame of possibly having to surrender Intramuros to the Filipino forces.

On the evening of August 12, the Americans notified Aguinaldo to forbid the insurgents under his command from entering Manila without American permission. On August 13, unaware of the peace protocol signing, U.S. forces assaulted and captured Spanish positions in Manila. While the plan was for a mock battle and simple surrender, the insurgents made an independent attack of their own, which led to confrontations with the Spanish in which some American soldiers were killed and wounded. The Spanish formally surrendered Manila to U.S. forces. There was some looting by Insurgent forces in portions of the city they occupied. Aguinaldo demanded joint occupation of the city, however U.S. commanders pressed Aguinaldo to withdraw his forces from Manila.

On August 12, 1898, The New York Times reported that a peace protocol had been signed in Washington that afternoon between the U.S. and Spain, suspending hostilities between the two nations. The full text of the protocol was not made public until November 5, but Article III read: "The United States will occupy and hold the City, Bay, and Harbor of Manila, pending the conclusion of a treaty of peace, which shall determine the control, disposition, and government of the Philippines." After conclusion of this agreement, U.S. President McKinley proclaimed a suspension of hostilities with Spain. General Merritt received news of the August 12 peace protocol on August 16, three days after the surrender of Manila. Admiral Dewey and General Merritt were informed by a telegram dated August 17 that the president of the United States had directed that the United States should have full control over Manila, with no joint occupation permissible. After further negotiations, insurgent forces withdrew from the city on September 15.

This battle marked the end of Filipino-American collaboration, as the American action of preventing Filipino forces from entering the captured city of Manila was deeply resented by the Filipinos.

==== U.S. military government ====
On August 14, 1898, two days after the capture of Manila, the U.S. established a military government in the Philippines, with General Wesley Merritt acting as military governor. During military rule (1898–1902), the U.S. military commander governed the Philippines under the authority of the U.S. president as commander-in-chief of the United States Armed Forces. After the appointment of a civil governor-general, the procedure developed that as parts of the country were pacified and placed firmly under American control, responsibility for the area would be passed to civilians.

General Merritt was succeeded by General Otis as military governor, who in turn was succeeded by General MacArthur. Major General Adna Chaffee was the final military governor. The position of military governor was abolished in July 1902, after which the civil governor-general became the sole executive authority in the Philippines.

Under the military government, an American-style school system was introduced, initially with soldiers as teachers; civil and criminal courts were reestablished, including a supreme court; and local governments were established in towns and provinces. The first local election was conducted by General Harold W. Lawton on May 7, 1899, in Baliuag, Bulacan.

==== Spanish–American War ends ====
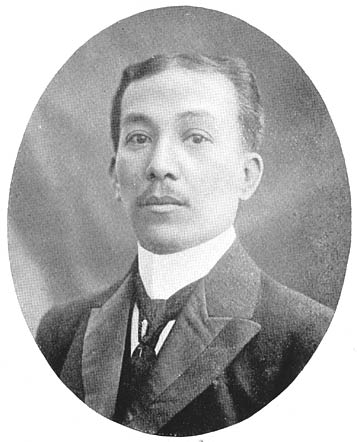
Felipe Agoncillo was the Filipino representative to the negotiations in Paris that led to the Treaty of Paris (1898), ending the Spanish–American War. He has been referred to as the "outstanding first Filipino diplomat."

After the United States occupied Manila in August 1898, Spanish authority elsewhere in the islands persisted briefly. The remaining colonial administration, under Governor-General Diego de los Ríos, withdrew to the Visayas and established a provisional government in Iloilo, which became, in effect, the new capital of the Spanish East Indies. Despite the growing revolutionary movement in Panay, Iloilo remained loyal to Spain, largely due to its strong economic ties and allegiance to Spain.

Meanwhile, peace negotiations between Spain and the United States were underway in Paris. The initial instructions to the American peace commission were to seek only Luzon and Guam as strategic bases, but President William McKinley later directed the commission to demand the entire Philippine archipelago. The resulting Treaty of Paris, signed on December 10, 1898, formally ended the Spanish–American War and provided for the cession of the Philippines to the United States in exchange for $20 million. This was later clarified by the 1900 Treaty of Washington, which included other Spanish-held islands outside the boundaries defined in the Treaty of Paris.

Even after the treaty’s signing, Spanish control in the Visayas continued briefly. On December 25, 1898, de los Ríos surrendered Iloilo to Filipino revolutionary forces led by General Martín Delgado, marking the final end of Spanish rule in the Philippines.

On December 21, 1898, President McKinley proclaimed a policy of benevolent assimilation, outlining U.S. policy toward the newly acquired Philippines. Announced in Manila on January 4, 1899, it declared that the islands would come under American sovereignty, with U.S. forces instructed to regard the Filipino people as friends rather than enemies.

=== First Philippine Republic ===
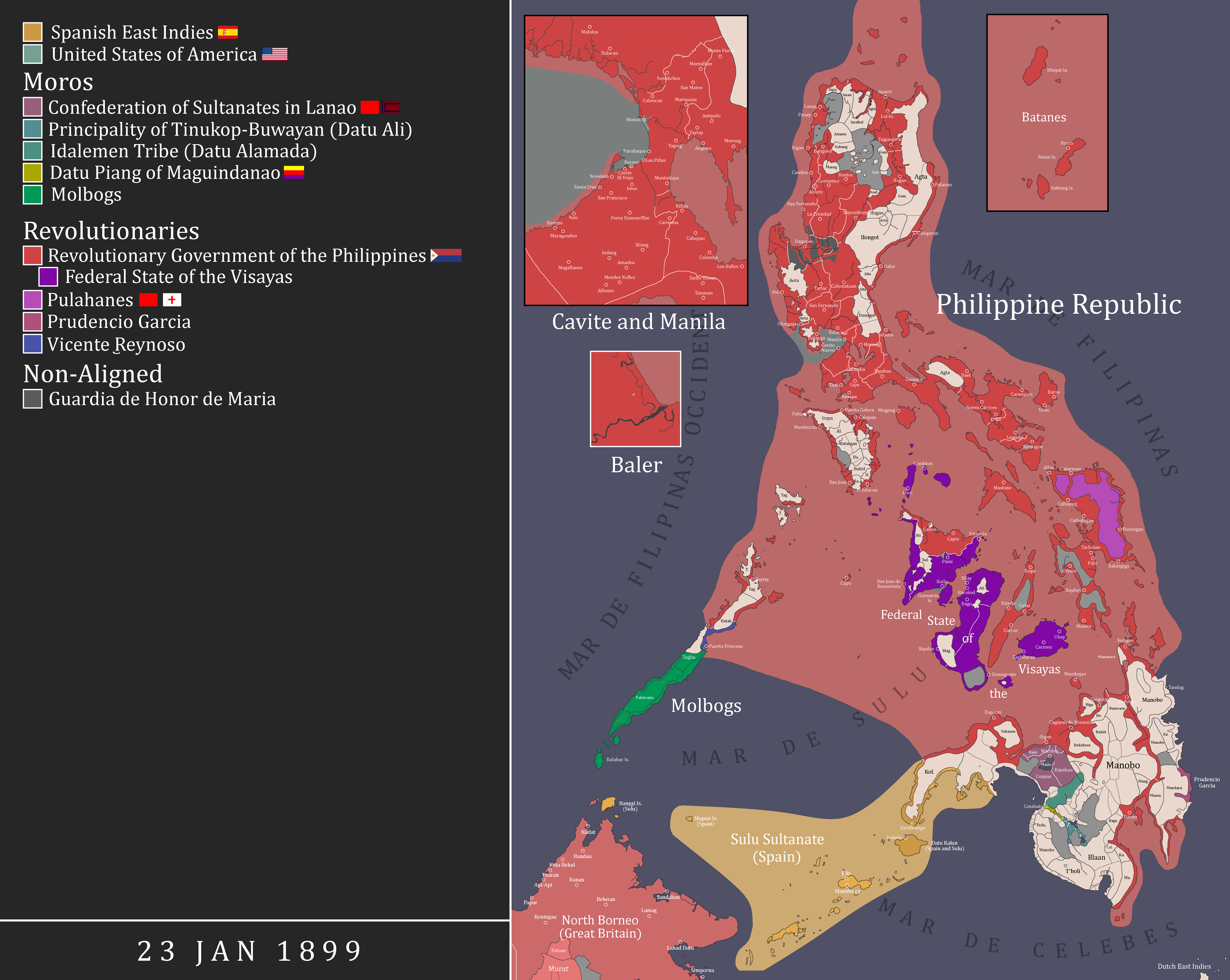
Map of the Philippines during the inauguration of the First Philippine Republic.

Elections were held by the revolutionary government between June and September 10, resulting in the seating of a legislature known as the Malolos Congress. This followed the recommendations of the decree that established the revolutionary government, and the Congreso Revolucionario (Revolutionary Congress) was assembled at Barasoain Church in Malolos, Bulacan on September 15. All of the delegates to the congress were from the ilustrado class. Mabini objected to the call for a constitutional assembly; when he did not succeed, he drafted a constitution of his own, which also failed. A draft by an ilustrado lawyer, Felipe Calderón y Roca, was instead presented, and this became the framework upon which the assembly drafted the first constitution, the Malolos Constitution. On November 29, the assembly, now popularly called the Malolos Congress, finished the draft. However, Aguinaldo, who always placed Mabini in high esteem and heeded most of his advice, refused to sign the draft when the latter objected. On January 21, 1899, after some modifications were made to suit Mabini's arguments, the constitution was finally approved by the Congress and signed by Aguinaldo. Two days later, the Philippine Republic (also called the First Republic and Malolos Republic) was established in Malolos with Emilio Aguinaldo as president. Its finalized constitution includes an article essentially authorizing the president to rule by decree, "while the country needs to fight for its independence". Two days later, the Philippine Republic (also called the First Republic and Malolos Republic) was established in Malolos with Emilio Aguinaldo as president.

On February 4, less than two weeks after the establishment ceremonies, the 1899 Battle of Manila erupted between Filipino and American forces. Fighting escalated quickly, developing from a continuance of the revolution into the Philippine–American War. Aguinaldo sent an emissary to the American commander, General Otis to appeal for an end to the fighting, but Otis rejected it, insisting that "fighting, having begun, must go on to the grim end." On June 2, the Governing Council of the Philippine Republic declared in a proclamation that it "has concluded to continue the war" against the Americans. Fighting quickly escalated into the Philippine–American War.

==== Philippine–American War ====
On February 4, 1899, hostilities between Filipino and American forces began when an American sentry patrolling between Filipino and American lines shot a Filipino soldier. The Filipino forces returned fire, thus igniting a second battle for Manila. Aguinaldo sent a ranking member of his staff to Ellwell Otis, the U.S. military commander, with the message that the firing had been against his orders. According to Aguinaldo, Otis replied, "The fighting, having begun, must go on to the grim end." The Philippines declared war against the United States on June 2, 1899, with Pedro Paterno, President of the Congress of the First Philippine Republic, issuing a Proclamation of War.

As the First Philippine Republic was never recognized as a sovereign state, and the United States never formally declared war, the conflict was not concluded by a treaty. On July 2, 1902, the United States Secretary of War telegraphed that since the insurrection against the United States had ended and provincial civil governments had been established throughout most of the Philippine archipelago, the office of military governor was terminated. On July 4, Theodore Roosevelt, who had succeeded to the U.S. presidency after the assassination of William McKinley, proclaimed an amnesty to those who had participated in the conflict. On April 9, 2002, Philippine President Gloria Macapagal Arroyo proclaimed that the Philippine–American War had ended on April 16, 1902, with the surrender of General Miguel Malvar, and declared the centennial anniversary of that date as a national working holiday and as a special non-working holiday in the Province of Batangas and in the cities of Batangas, Lipa and Tanauan.

== End of the revolution ==
The revolution essentially ended with the capture of Emilio Aguinaldo by American Forces on March 23, 1901, though fighting continued for some time in a few areas. Aguinaldo declared allegiance to the United States on April 1 and issued a proclamation on April 19 acknowledging that most of the Filipino people had united around the United States, declaring "unmistakably in favor of peace", and said, "a complete termination of hostilities and lasting peace are not only desirable, but absolutely essential to the welfare of the Philippine Islands." The U.S. president responded to this on July 4 by proclaiming a full and complete pardon and amnesty to all persons in the Philippine archipelago who have participated in the insurrection against U.S. sovereignty over the Philippines.

== Death toll ==
The Correlates of War project estimates that both sides suffered over 2000 combat deaths while losing many more to disease.

== See also ==
- American imperialism
- Battle of Pasong Tamo
- Bourgeois revolution
- History of the Philippines (1521–1898)
- History of the Philippines
- Influence of the French Revolution
- List of weapons of the Philippine revolution
- Moro Rebellion
- Negros Revolution
- Philippine revolts against Spain
- Federal State of the Visayas
- Republic of Zamboanga
- Timeline of the Philippine Revolution
- Spanish American wars of independence

== Bibliography ==
- Agoncillo, Teodoro C. (1990) [1960], History of the Filipino People (8th ed.), Quezon City: Garotech Publishing, ISBN 971-8711-06-6
- Aguinaldo y Famy, Emilio (1899), "Chapter II. The Treaty of Biak-na-bató", True Version of the Philippine Revolution, Authorama: Public Domain Books
- Aguinaldo y Famy, Emilio (1899), "Chapter III. Negotiations", True Version of the Philippine Revolution, Authorama: Public Domain Books
- Aguinaldo, E.; Pacis, V.A. (1957), A Second Look at America, Makers of history, R. Speller
- Alvarez, S.V. (1992), Recalling the Revolution, Madison: Center for Southeast Asia Studies, University of Wisconsin-Madison, ISBN 1-881261-05-0
- Alvarez, Santiago V.; Malay, Paula Carolina S. (1992), The katipunan and the revolution: memoirs of a general: with the original Tagalog text, Ateneo de Manila University Press, ISBN 978-971-550-077-7, Translated by Paula Carolina S. Malay
- Anderson, Benedict (2005), Under Three Flags: Anarchism and the Anti-Colonial Imagination, London: Verso, ISBN 1-84467-037-6
- Batchelor, Bob (2002), The 1900s : American popular culture through history, Greenwood Publishing Group, ISBN 978-0-313-31334-9
- Blanchard, William H. (1996), Neocolonialism American Style, 1960–2000 (illustrated ed.), Greenwood Publishing Group, ISBN 978-0-313-30013-4
- Beede, Benjamin R. (1994), The War of 1898, and U.S. interventions, 1898–1934: an encyclopedia, Taylor & Francis, ISBN 978-0-8240-5624-7
- Blair, Emma; Robertson, James (1903–1909), The Philippine Islands, 1493–1898, vol. 1–55, Cleveland
- Bowring, Sir John (1859), A Visit to the Philippine Islands, London: Smith, Elder and Co.
- Constantino, Renato (1975), The Philippines: A Past Revisited, Self-published, Tala Pub. Services
- de Moya, Francisco Javier (1883), Las Islas Filipinas en 1882 (in Spanish), vol. 1–55, Madrid
- Dav, Chaitanya (2007), Crimes Against Humanity: A Shocking History of U.s. Crimes Since 1776, AuthorHouse, ISBN 978-1-4343-0181-9
- Díaz Arenas, Rafaél (1838), Memoria sobre el comercio y navegacion de las islas Filipinas (in Spanish), Cádiz, Spain
- Elliott, Charles Burke (1917), The Philippines: To the End of the Commission Government, a Study in Tropical Democracy
- Escalante, Rene. "Collapse of the Malolos Republic." Philippine Studies 46#4 (1998), pp. 452–76. online blames Aguinaldo's incompetence for loss of public support and collapse of his regime.
- Foreman, J. (1906), The Philippine Islands: A Political, Geographical, Ethnographical, Social, and Commercial History of the Philippine Archipelago, New York: Charles Scribner's Sons
- Gatbonton, Esperanza B., ed. (2000), The Philippines After The Revolution 1898–1945, National Commission for Culture and the Arts, ISBN 971-814-004-2
- Guerrero, Milagros; Custodio, Teresa Ma.; Dalisay, Jose Y. (1998), "Reform and Revolution", Kasaysayan: The History of the Filipino People, vol. 5, Asia Publishing Company Limited, ISBN 962-258-228-1
- Guevara, Sulpico, ed. (1972), The laws of the first Philippine Republic (the laws of Malolos) 1898–1899, Ann Arbor, Michigan: University of Michigan Library (English translation by Sulpicio Guevara)
- Halili, Maria Christine N. (2004), Philippine History, Manila: Rex Book Store, ISBN 978-971-23-3934-9
- Halstead, Murat (1898), "XII. The American Army in Manila", The Story of the Philippines and Our New Possessions, Including the Ladrones, Hawaii, Cuba and Porto Rico
- Jagor, Feodor (1873), Weidmannsche Buchhandlung (in German), Berlin. An English translation under the title Travels in the Philippines was printed in London, 1875, by Chapman and Hall.
- Kalaw, Maximo Manguiat (1927), The Development of Philippine Politics, Oriental commercial
- Keat, Gin Ooi (2004), Southeast Asia: A Historical Encyclopedia, from Angkor Wat to East Timor, Volume 1, BC-CLIO, ISBN 978-1-57607-770-2
- Karnow, Stanley (1990), In Our Image, Century, ISBN 978-0-7126-3732-9
- Lacsamana, Leodivico Cruz (2006), Philippine history and government, Phoenix Publishing House, ISBN 978-971-06-1894-1
- Lone, Stewart (2007). Daily Lives of Civilians in Wartime Asia: From the Taiping Rebellion to the Vietnam War. Greenwood Publishing Group. ISBN 978-0-313-33684-3.
- Mabini, Apolinario (1969), "CHAPTER VIII: First Stage of the Revolution", in Guerrero, Leon Ma. (ed.), The Philippine Revolution, National Historical Commission, Translated by Leon Ma. Guerrero.
- Miller, Stuart Creighton (1984), Benevolent Assimilation: The American Conquest of the Philippines, 1899–1903 (4th edition, reprint ed.), Yale University Press, ISBN 978-0-300-03081-5
- Montero y Vidal, Jose (1887–1895), Historia general de Filipinas (in Spanish), vol. 1–3, Madrid: Imprenta de Manuel Tello
- Nelson-Pallmeyer, Jack (2005), Saving Christianity from empire, Continuum International Publishing Group, ISBN 978-0-8264-1627-8
- Padilla Angulo, Fernando J. (2023). Volunteers of the Empire. War, Identity, and Spanish Imperialism, 1855-1898. London: Bloomsbury Academic.
- Regidor, Antonio M.; Mason, J. Warren (1905), Commercial Progress in the Philippine Islands, London: Dunn & Chidley
- Rodao, Florentino; Rodríguez, Felice Noelle (2001), The Philippine revolution of 1896: ordinary lives in extraordinary times, Ateneo de Manila University Press, ISBN 978-971-550-386-0
- Salazar, Zeus (1994), Agosto 29-30, 1896: ang pagsalakay ni Bonifacio sa Maynila, Quezon City: Miranda Bookstore
- Seekins, Donald M. (1991), "Historical Setting—Outbreak of War, 1898", in Seekins, Dolan (ed.), Philippines: A Country Study, Washington: Library of Congress
- Sagmit, Rosario S.; Sagmit-Mendosa, Lourdes (2007), The Filipino Moving Onward 5, Rex Bookstore, Inc., ISBN 978-971-23-4154-0
- Schumacher, John N. (1991), The Making of a Nation: Essays on Nineteenth-century Filipino Nationalism, Ateneo de Manila University Press, ISBN 978-971-550-019-7
- Titherington, Richard Handfield (1900), A history of the Spanish–American War of 1898, D. Appleton and Company
- Trask, David F. (1996), The war with Spain in 1898, University of Nebraska Press, ISBN 978-0-8032-9429-5
- Wolff, Leon (2006), Little brown brother: how the United States purchased and pacified the Philippine Islands at the century's turn, History Book Club, ISBN 978-1-58288-209-3(Introduction, Decolonizing the History of the Philippine–American War, by Paul A. Kramer dated December 8, 2005)
- Worcester, Dean Conant (1914), The Philippines: Past and Present (vol. 1 of 2), Macmillan, pp. 75–89, ISBN 1-4191-7715-X
- Tuñon de Lara, Manuel (1974), La España del siglo XIX, Barcelona: Editorial Laia
- Zaide, Gregorio (1954), The Philippine Revolution, Manila: The Modern Book Company
- Zaide, Gregorio F. (1957), Philippine Political and Cultural History: The Philippines Since the British Invasion, vol. II (1957 Revised ed.), Manila: McCullough Printing Company
- Zaide, Sonia M. (1994), The Philippines: A Unique Nation, All-Nations Publishing Co., ISBN 978-971-642-071-5
