= Tomás Mascardo =

Filipino general

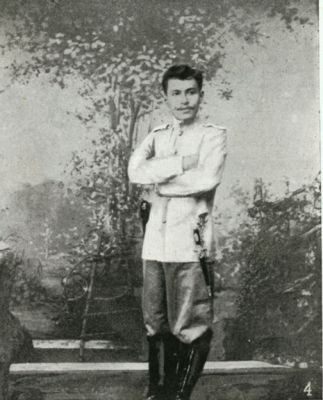

8th Governor of Cavite
- In office 1910–1912
- Preceded by: Leonardo Osorio
- Succeeded by: Antero Soriano

2nd Governor of Pampanga
- In office 1899
- Preceded by: Mariano Alimurung
- Succeeded by: Francisco Dizon

Member of the Malolos Congress from Zamboanga
- In office September 15, 1898 – November 13, 1899 Serving with Felipe Buencamino and Lazaro Tanedo

Personal details
- Born: Tomás Mascardo y Echenique; October 9, 1871 Cavite El Viejo, Captaincy General of the Philippines
- Died: July 7, 1932 (aged 60) Cavite, Philippine Islands
- Spouse: Carmen Topacio
- Children: 8
- Parent(s): Valentin Mascardo (father); Dolores Echenique (mother)

Military service
- Allegiance: First Philippine Republic; Republic of Biak-na-Bato; Katipunan (Magdalo)
- Branch/service: Philippine Revolutionary Army
- Rank: Brigadier General
- Battles/wars: Philippine Revolution * Battle of Zapote Bridge; Philippine–American War

Tomás Mascardo y Echenique (October 9, 1871 – July 7, 1932) was a Filipino general during the Philippine Revolution and Philippine–American War. He joined the fight against the Spaniards at the beginning of the revolution. He later became the governor of Cavite for one term from 1910–1912.

== Biography ==
=== Early years ===
Tomás Mascardo was born in the town of Cavite del Viejo (now Kawit) to Valentín Mascardo and Dolores Echenique. The affluent couple, a landowner and a rice dealer, had a total of seven children. Tomás finished his teacher's diploma from Escuela Normal in Manila and became a teacher at the barrio school of Halang in Amadeo, Cavite.

=== Philippine revolution ===
Mascardo was part of the revolution against the Spaniards from the beginning. He became the chief of the revolutionary intelligence service in Manila, succeeding Miguel Liedo who was earlier captured and executed by the Spaniards. He was ordered by General Emilio Aguinaldo to attack a Spanish stronghold in Tanauan, Batangas, which the general later expressed his awe at Mascardo's courage. In time, he was promoted to brigadier general. Mascardo, together with his commander, General Edilberto Evangelista, fought at the Battle of Zapote Bridge on February 17, 1897, where Spanish forces able to kill Evangelista and wound Mascardo.

=== Philippine–American War ===
During the Philippine–American War, Mascardo was assigned as commanding general of the revolutionary forces in the provinces of Pampanga, Bataan, and Zambales with barracks based in Bagac, Bataan. During the Battle of Calumpit, Luna ordered Mascardo to send troops from Guagua to strengthen the former's defenses. However, Mascardo ignored Luna's orders, insisting that he was going to Arayat to undertake an "inspection of troops". Another version of Mascardo's reasoning emerged and it was probably that which reached Luna. Luna, infuriated by Mascardo's actions, had decided to detain him. Following Aguinaldo's capture by the Americans, Mascardo ordered his subordinate, then-Major Manuel L. Quezon, to surrender so he could verify Aguinaldo's capture and if so, consult him for final orders. Quezon was able to meet Aguinaldo in Malacañan, where the latter was detained, and relayed Mascardo's message. Aguinaldo instructed Quezon to inform Mascardo that the decision to surrender was up to the general himself. Mascardo surrendered on May 15, 1901, calculating that his deficiency in weaponry would mean sure defeat from the well-armed Americans.

=== Political career and death ===
Mascardo returned to Cavite following his release by the Americans. He was later influenced to enter politics, and won the race for Governor of Cavite, a post he held from 1910–1912. After serving one term, he retired to live a private life. On July 7, 1932, he died from a heart disease.

== Personal life ==
Mascardo was married to Carmen Topacio of Imus, Cavite. The couple had eight children – Modesto, Dominador (who became a general), Petra, Pura, Jaime, Tomás, Salvador (a former collector of customs at the Manila International Airport), and Emiliano.

== In popular culture ==
- Portrayed by Allan Paule in the film, El Presidente (2012).
- Portrayed by Lorenz Martinez in the film, Heneral Luna (2015).
