= Pasong Tamo =

Pasong Tamo, translated from Tagalog as "path of tamo", a type of wild grass, can mean two places in Metro Manila, Philippines:

- Chino Roces Avenue, Makati, formerly called Pasong Tamo
- Barangay Pasong Tamo, a neighborhood in Quezon City
  - Battle of Pasong Tamo, skirmishes during the Philippine Revolution
