= Edilberto Evangelista =

Filipino general (1862–1897)

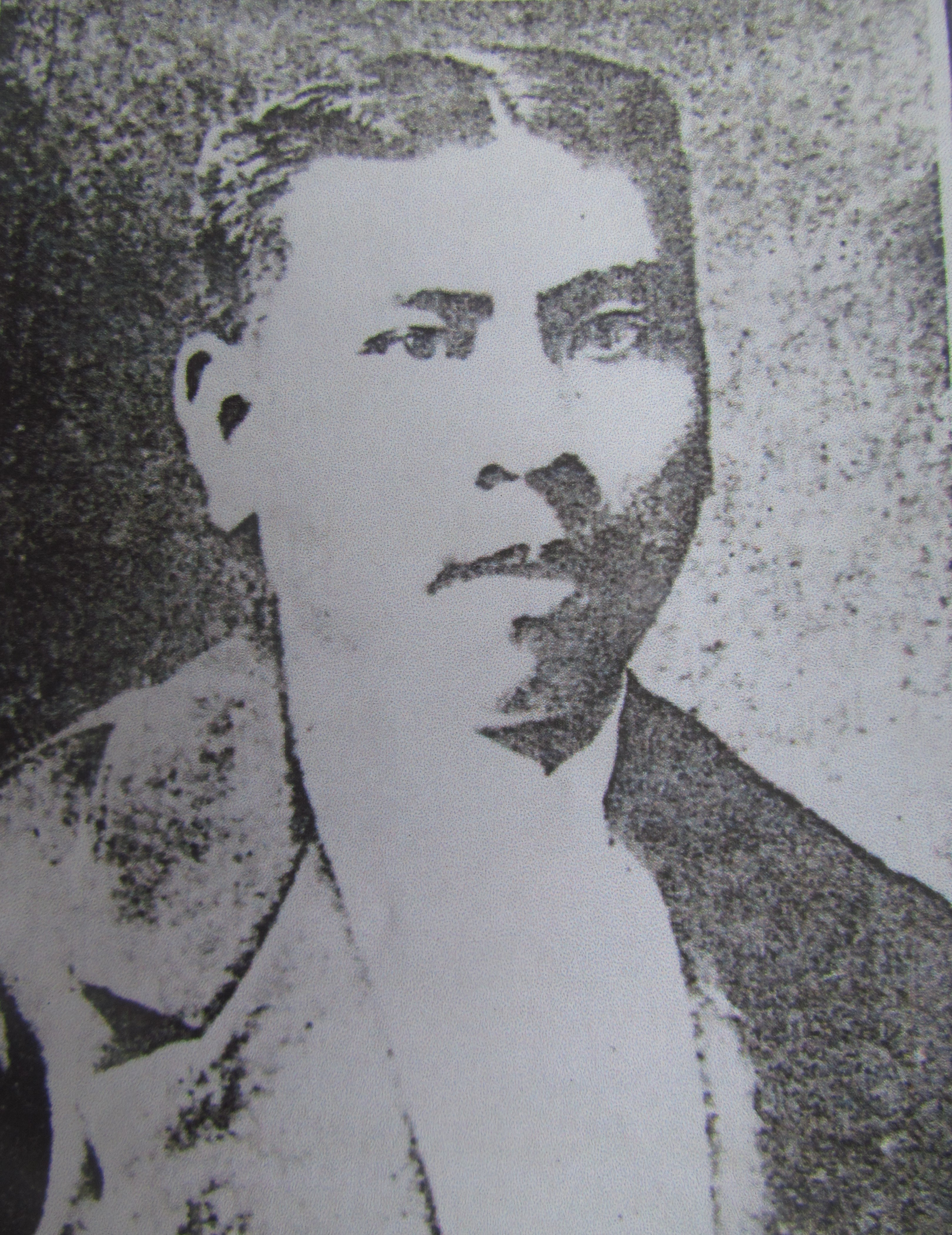
- Portrait image of Edilberto Evangelista
- Born: February 24, 1862; Santa Cruz, Manila, Captaincy General of the Philippines
- Died: February 17, 1897 (aged 34); Zapote Bridge, Bacoor and Las Piñas (Manila–Cavite provincial boundary), Captaincy General of the Philippines
- Military career
- Allegiance: Katipunan (Magdalo)
- Service years: 1897
- Rank: Lieutenant General
- Nickname: Ipil
- Conflicts: Philippine Revolution: Battle of Binakayan-Dalahican; Battle of Zapote Bridge †

Edilberto Evangelista (February 24, 1862 – February 17, 1897) was a Filipino civil engineer and a revolutionary.

== Early life and career ==
He was born in Sta. Cruz, Manila, on February 24, 1862. Evangelista finished his Bachelor of Arts at the Colegio de San Juan de Letran in 1878. He was awarded a medal of excellence in Mathematics. Poor health made him to drop his idea of studying medicine. After this, he became a teacher, a cattle dealer, a tobacco merchant between Cebu and Manila, and later a contractor of public works. He soon went to Madrid in 1890. It was during this time that he befriended many Filipino patriots, including José Rizal, who advised him to study engineering in Belgium. He therefore enrolled at the University of Ghent, one of the world's top engineering schools, and finished civil engineering and architecture with highest honors. He then received profitable offers of employment from several institutions in Europe but he declined because of his zeal to serve his country.

== Philippine Revolution ==
He returned to the Philippines in September 1896, shortly after the start of the Philippine Revolution. He was arrested and imprisoned, since the Spanish authorities suspected many people of the revolution and he had in his possession Jose Rizal's Noli Me Tangere and El Filibusterismo, but he escaped. He joined General Emilio Aguinaldo's command on October 22, 1896. At the Imus Assembly on December 31, 1896, Evangelista had submitted his draft of a constitution as requested by both Magdalo and Magdiwang factions of the Katipunan. He was elected Lieutenant General in the said meeting, now in the ranks of Artemio Ricarte. Aguinaldo later utilized General Evangelista's engineering skills. He planned and built forts and barricades in Bacoor, Binakayan, Cavite Viejo, Munting-ilog, Silang, Dasmariñas, Imus, Salitran, Bayang-Luma, and Noveleta, to serve as protection against Spanish forces. One Spanish general commented that the fortifications were the "fortifications of the future." Aguinaldo himself publicly recommended Evangelista to head the revolutionary government that would be established in lieu of the Katipunan, for he was "the most educated" in the organization. Aguinaldo also said that Evangelista could "command the respect of the Spaniards". He was part of the Magdalo government, serving as assistant overall captain general to Aguinaldo. Though in the actual sense, he was neutral in the Magdalo-Magdiwang feud.

Evangelista was calm but fatalistic, a characteristic misinterpreted as bravery. He was drawing trenches on the ground with a stick while the enemy fired cannons at their forces. One time, a shell dropped very near him yet he did not flinch nor run, instead he brushed the dust off his coat and continued to draw. He died, along with Captain Mariano San Gabriel and Captain Mariano Ramírez, on February 17, 1897, during the Battle of Zapote Bridge. His post was succeeded by his protégé, Miguel Malvar.

== Legacy ==
A military camp in Cagayan de Oro was named after him, Camp Edilberto Evangelista. However, local lawmakers in the area have recently filed House Bill No. 4735, suggesting to change the name into Camp Jose Montalvan. Camp Edilberto Evangelista is the largest military camp in Mindanao with an area of 129 hectares. It houses the 4th Infantry Division of the Philippine Army.

There are two major streets named after Evangelista: one in Quiapo, Manila and the other in Bangkal, Makati. The streets that bear his name are now famous for its thrift and second-hand shops. Gen. Evangelista Street, a main thoroughfare from Zapote to Mabolo in Bacoor, was also named after him.

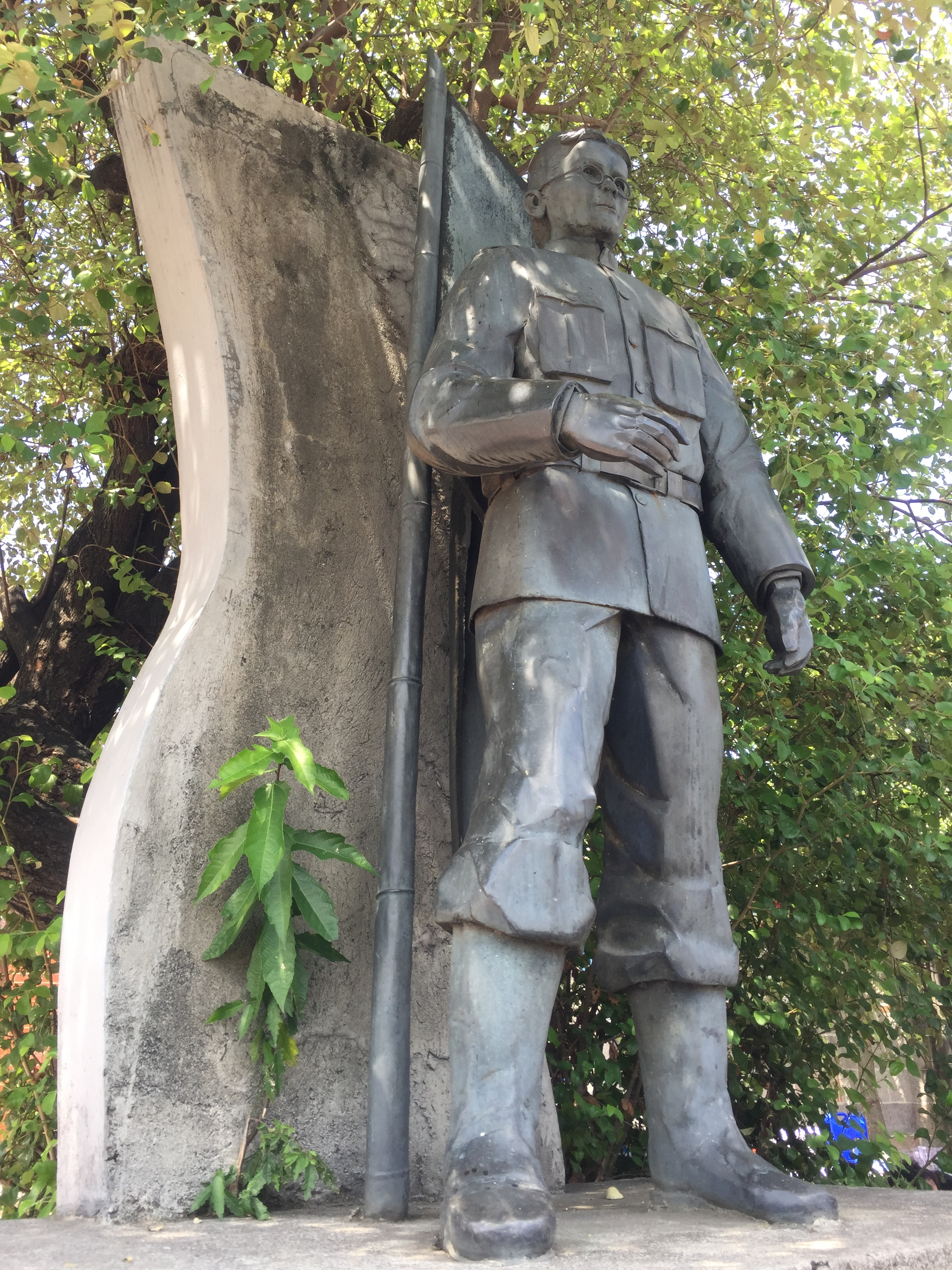
The Monument of Edilberto Evangelista Erected Beside the Zapote Bridge.

House Bill No. 5659, passed on December 18, 2008, by seven lawmakers, sought to rename the Alabang–Zapote Road in Las Piñas to General Edilberto Evangelista Avenue for the latter's fearless exploits during the Philippine Revolution.

== In popular culture ==
- Portrayed by Alireza Libre in the 2012 film, El Presidente.
