= José de Lachambre =

Governor-General of the Philippines and senator

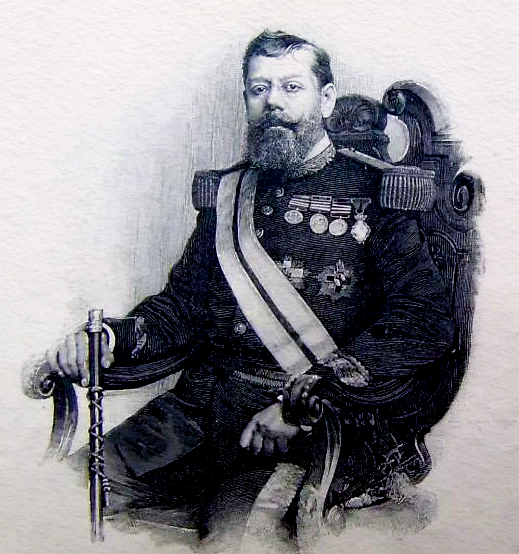
- Lachambre's official portrait

114th Governor-General of the Philippines
- In office 15 April 1897 – 23 April 1897
- Monarch: Alfonso XII of Spain
- Preceded by: Camilo Polavieja
- Succeeded by: Fernando Primo de Rivera

José María Julián de Lachambre Domínguez (16 March 1846 – 13 July 1903) was a senator and the ad interim Spanish Governor-General of the Philippines after Camilo Polavieja was recalled by the Cánovas government who was displeased with Polavieja's policy. Fernando Primo de Rivera was appointed and took office for the second time as governor general (the first from 1880-1883) on April 23, 1897.

Government offices
Preceded by Camilo Polavieja	Spanish Governor - Captain General of the Philippines; 1897	Succeeded by Fernando Primo de Rivera
