= Magdalo (faction) =

Philippine political faction

- Flag of the Tagalog Republic
- Type: Political faction
- Headquarters: Kawit, Cavite
- Faction leader: Baldomero Aguinaldo
- Key people: Emilio Aguinaldo; Licerio Topacio; Cayetano Topacio; Candido Tirona; Edilberto Evangelista
- Parent organization: Katipunan

The Magdalo was a faction of the Katipunan (a Philippine revolutionary organization with the aim to gain independence from Spain during the Philippine Revolution) chapter in Cavite. It was named after Mary Magdalene, patroness of Kawit, Cavite. It was officially led by Baldomero Aguinaldo, but his cousin Emilio Aguinaldo (whose own Katipunan codename was "Magdalo") was its most famous leader.

The seal of Magdalo Council

The Magdalo was often militarily separated and conflicted with the Magdiwang faction's chapter in Cavite. When the Manila-based Katipunan supreme leader Andres Bonifacio went to Cavite to mediate between the two factions, the Magdalo argued to replace the Katipunan with a revolutionary government. The Magdiwang under Bonifacio put forth that the Katipunan already served as the government. However, the two factions agreed to convene at Tejeros to form a new unified government, and from the combination of representatives from both factions, Emilio Aguinaldo was elected president.

Some of the civil and military officials of the First Philippine Republic came from the Magdalo.

== Magdalo Leaders ==
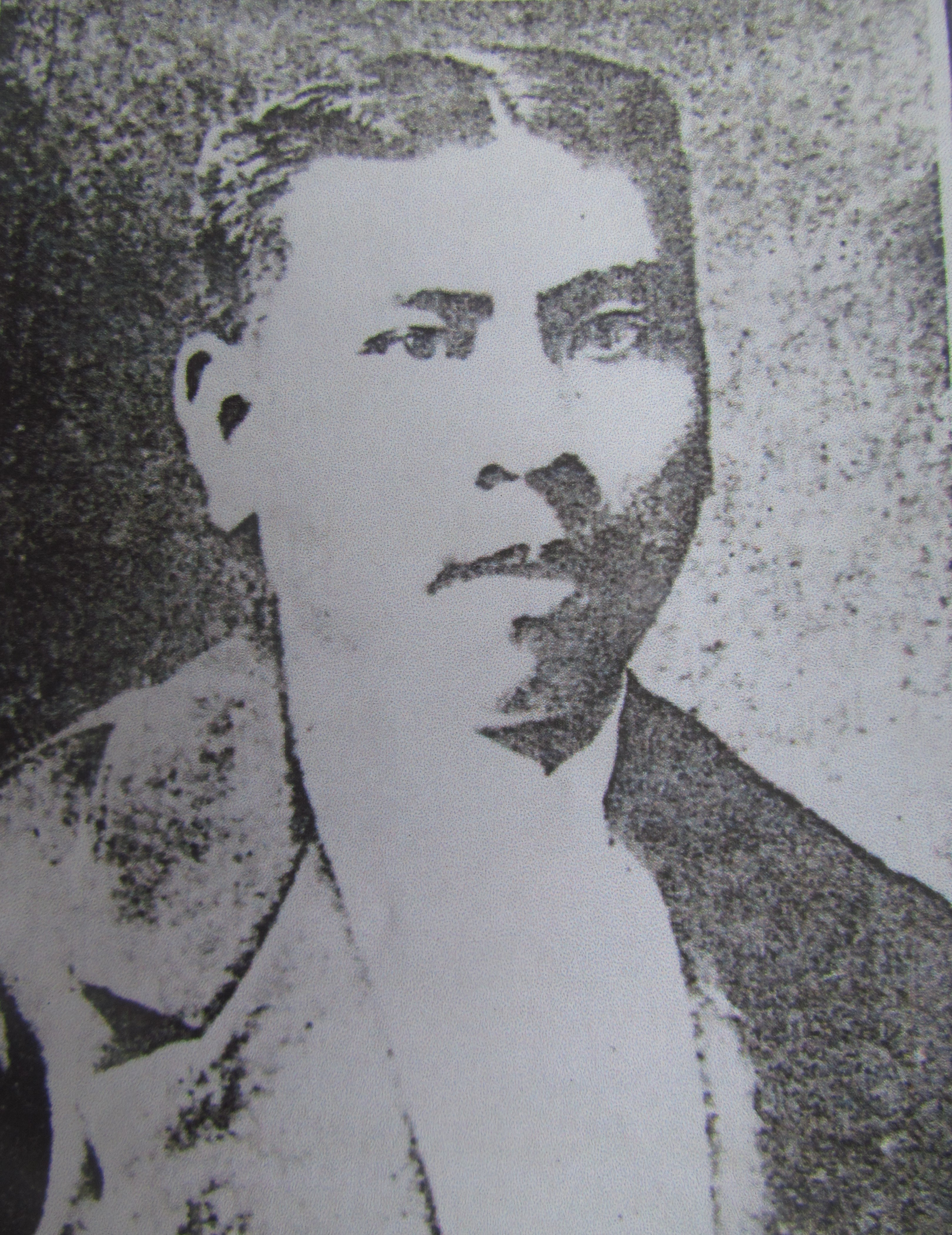
Magdalo's Edilberto Evangelista one of the key figures, during the battle at Binakayan that led for the Katipunan victory in 1896.

- Baldomero Aguinaldo - President
- Edilberto Evangelista - Vice President
- Candido Tirona - Secretary of War
- Felix Cuenca - Secretary of Interior
- Glicerio Topacio - Secretary of Public Works
- Cayetano Topacio - Secretary of Finance
- Emilio Aguinaldo - Flag Officer

== Magdalo Municipalities ==
- Cavite El Viejo
- Imus
- Silang
- Bakoor
- Carmona
- Mendez-Nuñez
- Dasmariñas
- Amadeo
