= Teodoro Plata =

Filipino patriot

Teodoro Plata (1866 – February 6, 1897) was a Filipino patriot, and a co-founder of the Katipunan, the secret society which sparked the Philippine Revolution against Spanish rule in 1896.

He met Andres C. Bonifacio at a boarding house in Manila along with Ladislao Diwa who was then a law student at the University of Santo Tomas. Bonifacio, Diwa and Plata were all freemasons who were inspired by the nationalistic objectives of the Propaganda Movement in Europe.

Plata was a member of La Liga Filipina, which was founded by José Rizal to push for reforms in the Spanish colonial administration. But he agreed with Bonifacio and Diwa who believed that the time was ripe for an armed uprising.

On July 6, 1892, upon learning of Rizal's exile to Dapitan island in Mindanao, Plata, Bonifacio and Diwa decided to form a secret society to prepare for a revolution against Spain. The following day, they met with their friends and fellow freemasons Deodato Arellano, Valentin Díaz and José Dizon at a house in Tondo and established the Katipunan.

In 1892, he served as the secretary of the secret society with Arellano as president, Bonifacio as comptroller, Diwa as fiscal, and Díaz as treasurer.

In 1893, under the presidency of Román Basa, Plata served as councilor and it was at this time that the society organized a women's auxiliary section. One of its first members was Plata's cousin Gregoria de Jesús, who wrote in her autobiography that Plata was Bonifacio's constant companion when he would call at their house in Caloocan to court her.

In August 1896, immediately before the discovery of the Katipunan, Plata was elected secretary of war in the last Supreme Council that was constituted by Bonifacio like a government cabinet.

When the Spanish started arresting Katipunan members of August 19, 1896, Bonifacio called for a general assembly at Pugadlawin, a place in Balintawak (which was then under the town of Caloocan). The meeting on August 23 was attended by about 1,000 Katipuneros and there ensued a debate on whether they should commit themselves to an uprising. Plata opposed the declaration of hostilities because they had few arms and ammunition. But the final vote decided on starting the rebellion and the Katipuneros tore their residence and identity certificates.

A few weeks later, however, Plata was arrested and, after a military trial, he was executed by musketry on February 6, 1897, along with Apolonio de la Cruz, Vicente Molina, Hermenegildo de los Reyes, José Trinidad, Pedro Nicodemus, Feliciano del Rosario, Gervasio Samson and Doroteo Domínguez.

== In popular culture ==
- Portrayed by Richard Quan in the 2014 film, Bonifacio: Ang Unang Pangulo.
