= Ladislao Diwa =

Filipino revolutionary (1863–1930)

Ladislao Diwa y Nocon
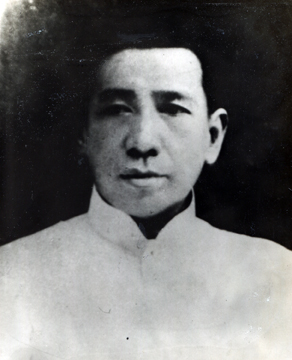

3rd Governor of Cavite
- In office October 7, 1898 – May 13, 1901
- Preceded by: Emiliano Riego De Dios
- Succeeded by: Mariano Trías

Personal details
- Born: Ladislao Diwa y Nocon; June 27, 1863 San Roque, Cavite, Captaincy General of the Philippines
- Died: March 12, 1930 (aged 66) Tagaytay, Cavite, Philippine Islands
- Education: Colegio de San Juan de Letran; University of Santo Tomas

Ladislao Diwa y Nocon (June 27, 1863 − March 12, 1930) was a Filipino patriot who was among the founders of the Katipunan that initiated the Philippine Revolution against Spain in 1896.

== Early years ==
He was born in San Roque, Cavite to Mariano Diwa and Cecilia Nocon and was educated at the Colegio de San Juan de Letran and later studied for the priesthood at the University of Santo Tomas. But he had to abandon his ecclesiastical studies just before his ordination in order to pursue law. He believed that due to the political unrest in the country, he would be able to serve in a much greater capacity as a lawyer than as a priest.

He studied law instead and it was while he was studying law that Diwa met Andrés Bonifacio who often distributed propaganda material, authored by José Rizal and Marcelo H. del Pilar during the Propaganda Movement in Spain, inside the university campus. The two became close friends and Diwa later boarded with Teodoro Plata at Bonifacio's house in Tondo, Manila.

== The Katipunan ==
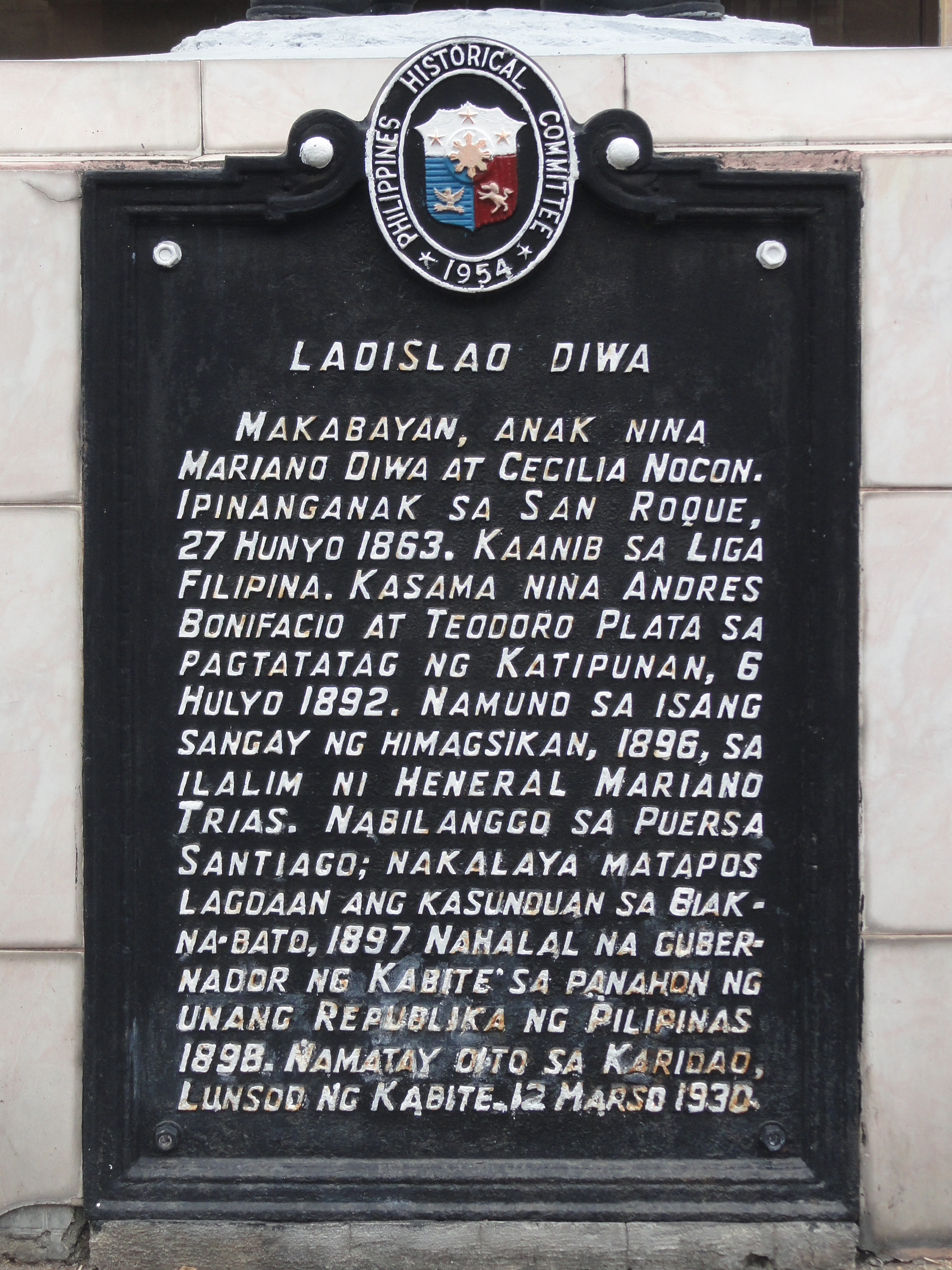
Ladislao Diwa PHC historical marker

After finishing his law studies, Diwa was named a clerk in a district court of Quiapo, Manila. While an employee of the court, Diwa joined La Liga Filipina and became secretary of La Liga's council in Trozo in Tondo, under the presidency of Bonifacio. However, Rizal was arrested a few days after establishing La Liga and he was deported to Dapitan island.

Although they were members of La Liga which espoused the peaceful reform of the Spanish colonial government, Diwa, Bonifacio and Plata were apparently convinced that an armed uprising was the only way to attain independence from Spain. After hearing of Rizal's deportation, they founded a secret society and called it Katipunan in Tondo on July 7, 1892. The meeting was also attended by Deodato Arellano, Valentin Díaz and José Dizon.

Adopting the symbolic name Balete, Diwa formed the Katipunan's first triangle with Bonifacio and Plata and became the society's fiscal. He later formed a triangle of his own with Román Basa and Teodoro Gonzales, who would respectively become president and councilor of the Katipunan's supreme council. The following year, Diwa continued to serve as councilor.

Diwa contributed to the Katipunan's expansion to the countryside because of his transfer to the court of a justice of the peace in Pampanga province. Katipuneros in Bulacan, Tarlac and Nueva Ecija claim to have been inducted into the Katipunan by Diwa himself. One of the most notable was Francisco Macabulos, who would become one of the most successful Filipino generals of the Katipunan.

== The revolution ==
The Spanish authorities arrested Diwa shortly after the Katipunan was uncovered in August 1896. He was arrested in Betis, Bacolor, Pampanga and brought to Manila. He was imprisoned at Fort Santiago in the same cell as Teodoro Plata, who was arrested earlier. The Spanish then unleashed a series of executions to quell the uprising, including that of Rizal who was executed by musketry on December 30, 1896.

On February 6, 1897, Plata was brought out of their common cell and executed at the field of Bagumbayan. Four days later, Diwa was unexpectedly released in a prisoner exchange between the Spanish authorities and the Filipino revolutionists. He fled to Cavite to join the revolutionary troops of Mariano Trías but the entire province was then under siege and he had to covertly cross enemy lines. After joining the revolutionists, he became active in combat and became instrumental in the surrender of the Spanish forces under Leopoldo Garcia. Because of this, Diwa was promoted to colonel in the revolutionary army. When the First Philippine Republic was organized, he was named first civil governor of Cavite.

== Under American occupation ==
When the Philippine–American War broke out in 1898, Diwa again rejoined Trías, who appointed him his secretary. After Aguinaldo's capture in Palanan, Isabela on March 23, 1901, they both surrendered to the Americans in Indang, Cavite. Diwa was later named clerk of court of the Court of First Instance of Cavite. He also taught at the Ligaya College, which he co-founded in his hometown. He then retired to his farms in Tagaytay and Mendez. He died of nephritis on March 12, 1930. He was married twice. His first wife was Delisa Dandan with whom he had three children. His second wife was Honorata Crescini with whom he had five children.

The Caridad Elementary School in Cavite City was renamed Ladislao Diwa Elementary School in his honor in November 1964.

== In popular culture ==
- Portrayed by Ping Medina in the 2014 film, Bonifacio: Ang Unang Pangulo.
