= Deodato Arellano =

Filipino propagandist

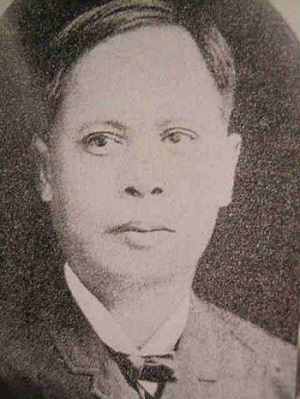
- Born: July 26, 1844; Bulakan, Bulacan, Captaincy General of the Philippines, Spanish Empire
- Died: October 7, 1899 (aged 55); Bontoc, Bontoc, First Philippine Republic
- Burial place: La Trinidad, Benguet, Philippines
- Other name: Buan
- Education: Ateneo Municipal de Manila
- Spouses: Paula Rivera (died); Hilaria del Pilar (m. 1877)

Deodato Arellano y de la Cruz (July 26, 1844 – October 7, 1899) was a Filipino propagandist and the first president of the Katipunan, which was founded at his home in Azcarraga Street (Claro M. Recto Avenue today), Manila. He was first to be given the title Supremo by the Katipunan. After studying bookkeeping in Ateneo de Municipal de Manila (Ateneo de Manila University now), he became an assistant clerk for the Spanish military. He was a member of the Freemasonry in the Philippines and became involved in the Propaganda Movement.

== Biography ==
=== Early life and career ===
Arellano was born on July 26, 1844, in Maysantol, Bulacan, Bulacan to Juan Arellano and Mamerta de la Cruz. Their family surname was replaced to Arellano conforming to the 1849 order of then Governor-General of the Philippines Narciso Clavería y Zaldúa to standardize conventions on family names. Arellano went to Ateneo Municipal de Manila (now known as Ateneo de Manila University) to study about bookkeeping. He became an assistant clerk at the weaponry division of the artillery corps of the Spanish military, the Maestranza de Artilleria. His first wife, Paula Rivera, died and became a widower but he later married Hilaria Gatmaitan del Pilar (a sister of Marcelo H. del Pilar), on April 22, 1877.

Like his brother-in-law, Arellano was an active Freemason, hailing from Logia Lusong No. 185. Buan was his masonic name. He also solicited funds for Filipino expatriates in Spain when del Pilar had to flee to Spain, because of allegedly subversive articles that appeared in the Filipino newspaper that del Pilar published, the Diariong Tagalog (Tagalog Newspaper). He was also part of the short-lived La Propaganda, a movement founded by his brother-in-law del Pilar and Mariano Ponce, which sought reforms in the political landscape of the Philippines.

=== Membership in La Liga Filipina and Katipunan ===
In 1892, Arellano and other freemasons, like Andrés Bonifacio, joined La Liga Filipina, which was founded by José Rizal upon his return to the country. Arellano was elected the league's secretary. A few days after the founding of La Liga Filipina, Rizal was arrested and detained in Fort Santiago and then later deported to Dapitan island in Mindanao. On July 7, 1892, it was Gov. Eulogio Despujol who announced Rizal's immediate deportation to Dapitan. On the same day, the Katipunan was founded at Arellano's home in 72 Azcarraga Street (now Claro M. Recto Avenue), Manila where Andres Bonifacio— a Liga member— assembled Teodoro Plata, Valentin Diaz, Ladislao Diwa, Jose Dizon and Arellano himself to establish the said underground association. Its main goal was to reach Philippine independence from Spain and not just reforms.

During the undisclosed October 1892 meeting of the Katipunan, Arellano was elected the first president of its Supreme Council and the first to be given the title Supremo. During his term as president, he endorsed the Katipunan's laws developed by its members particularly Plata and Diwa. In February 1893, Bonifacio saw Arellano as ineffective in leading the secret organization, thus, Roman Basa replaced him and became the second Supremo. In spite of his removal as president, Arellano respectfully continued to be active in the movement. He organized provincial councils in Bulacan during the same time Bonifacio and other members also organized councils in Manila, as a result, they attained one of the goals of Rizal in forming the Liga.

=== Later life and death ===
Arellano brought back the Liga in April 1893 to keep up the efforts of Rizal, despite not being present with them. Juan de Zulueta helped him to reestablish the Liga and they elected new set of officers with Arellano getting the secretary and treasurer positions. Although, the Liga was later dissolved lasting only six months. Three years later, on October 10, 1896, he was arrested and later jailed and then went back to his hometown in Bulacan. When the revolution broke out in August 1896, he joined the brigade of Gregorio del Pilar, his nephew, becoming its commissary officer. Although in some historians, his life after his arrest is vague but they inclined to believe that Arellano did join his nephew's brigade.

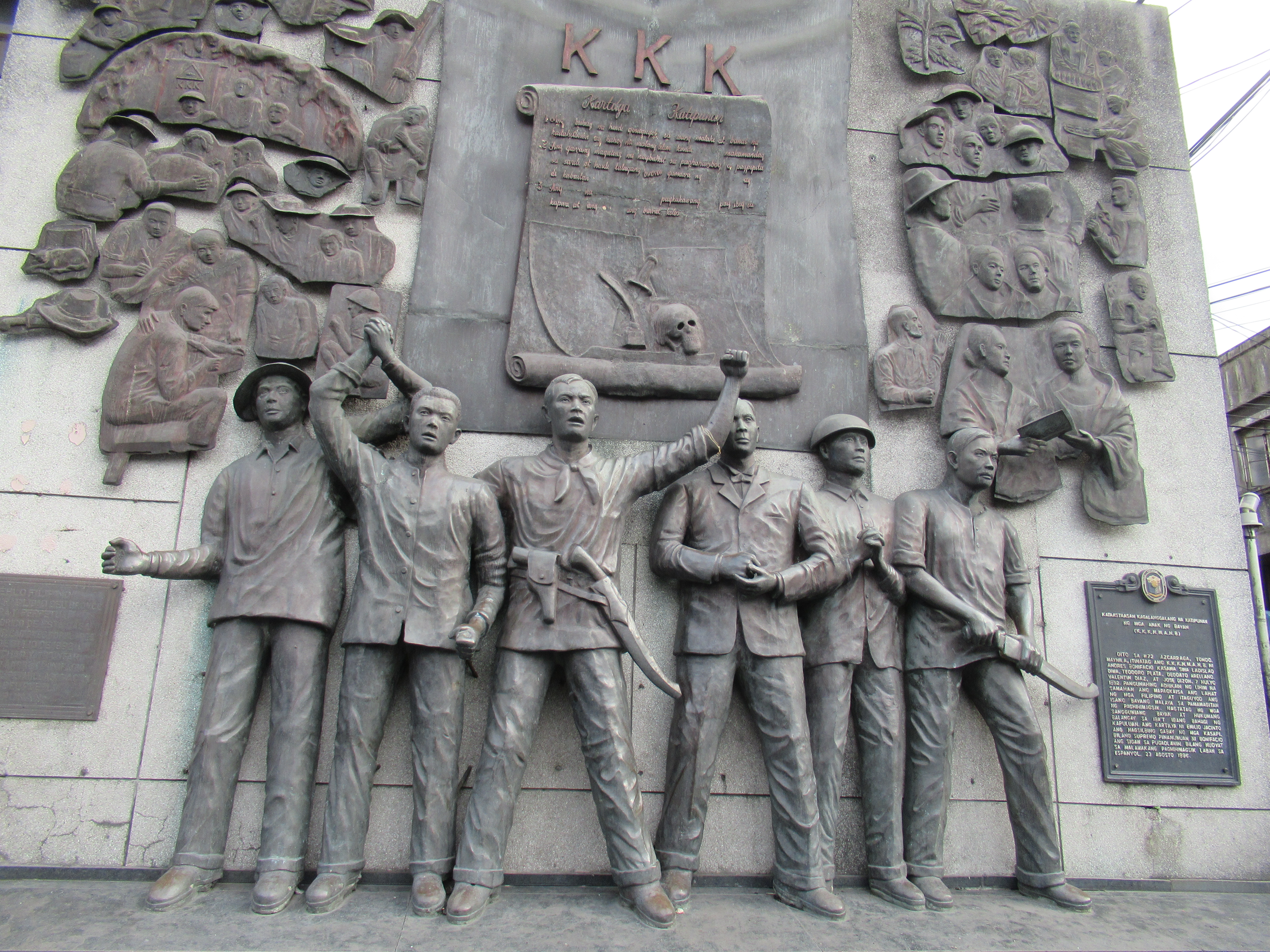
Deodato Arellano monument (Recto Avenue)

He fought in the battles in Bulacan during the Philippine–American War, but he contracted tuberculosis in the course of the war and died of the disease while he and his fellow revolutionists were fighting in the Cordillera Mountains. His comrades buried him in the town cemetery of La Trinidad, Benguet. There are sources saying that he died of tuberculosis on October 7, 1899 but as previously mentioned, his life after his arrest in 1896 remains unclear. There are historians who hold that after Arellano was named by Katipunan members who were apprehended by the Spaniards and forced to reveal information, he was eventually arrested too, then tortured and finally abandoned to die.

== Legacy ==
Arellano is honored in the Birthplace of the Katipunan Monument (72 Calle Azcárraga, Tondo, Manila) and the Kataastaasan Kagalanggalang na Katipunan ng mga Anak ng Bayan historical marker installed by the National Historical Institute in 2008.

Arellano's relief with historical marker at Bulacan Heroes Park, Bulacan Provincial Capitol Compound recently honored him.

== In popular culture ==
- Obet Pagdanganan portrayed Deodato Arellano in the 1997 film, Tirad Pass: The Story of Gen. Gregorio del Pilar.
- Bernard Carritero portrayed Deodato Arellano in Katipunan, a 2013 TV series of GMA Network.
