= Valentín Díaz =

Filipino patriot (1845–1916)

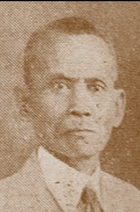
- Born: Valentín Díaz y Villanueva; November 1, 1845; Paoay, Ilocos Norte, Captaincy General of the Philippines, Spanish Empire
- Died: December 11, 1916 (aged 71); Tondo, Manila, Insular Government of the Philippine Islands

Valentín Díaz y Villanueva (1 November 1845 – 11 December 1916) was a Filipino patriot who was among the founders of the Katipunan that started the Philippine Revolution against Spain in 1896. He was elected as treasurer of the organization. On July 7, 1892, he together with fellow masons Andres Bonifacio, Deodato Arellano, Ladislao Diwa, and Jose Dizon founded the Katipunan through the ritual of blood compact.

Díaz was born in Paoay, Ilocos Norte. He was a member of La Liga Filipina, which José Rizal founded to peacefully promote reforms in the Spanish colonial administration of the Philippines. Being a resident of Tondo, Manila, he joined the La Liga council that was headed by Andrés Bonifacio, one of the founders of the Katipunan.

Díaz was one of the signatories of the Pact of Biak-na-Bato in 1897. He joined the revolutionaries exiled in Hong Kong as one of the conditions set forth by the Pact.

Díaz died on 11 December 1916 at the age of 71.

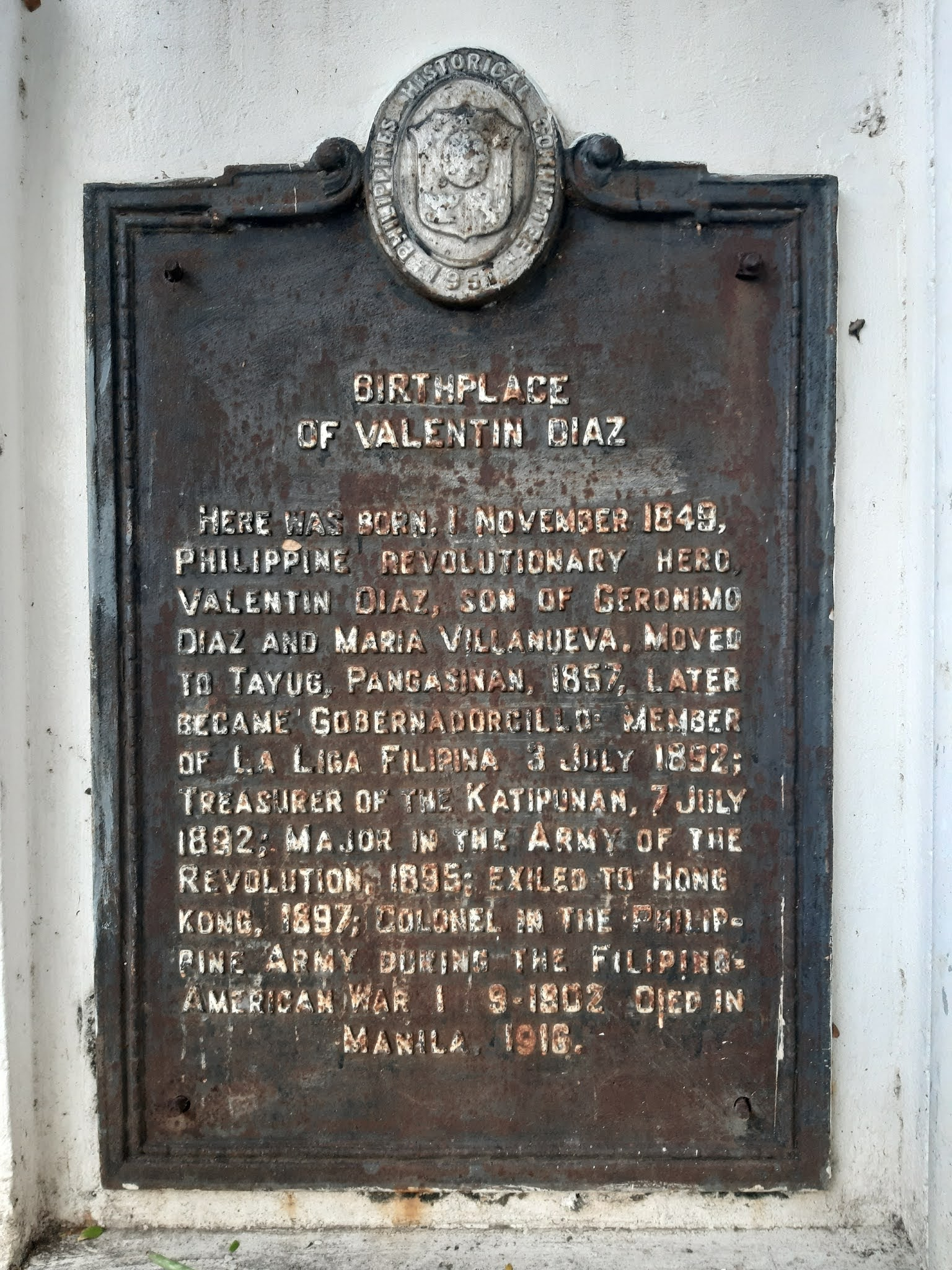
Birthplace of Valentin Diaz NHC historical marker
