= Román Basa =

Filipino patriot (1848–1897)

Román Bása
- Born: Román Bása y Esteban; February 29, 1848; San Roque de Cavite; Captaincy General of the Philippines
- Died: February 6, 1897 (aged 48); Manila, Captaincy General of the Philippines
- Cause of death: Execution by firing squad

Román Bása (February 29, 1848 – February 6, 1897) was a Filipino patriot who was the second Supremo or leader of the Katipunan, the secret society which sparked the Philippine Revolution against Spanish rule in 1896.

== Personal life, education and career ==
Basa was born to Mariano Basa and Dorotea Esteban in San Roque, Cavite where he also completed his primary schooling.

He was an alumnus of Escuela Nautica de Manila, now known as the Philippine Merchant Marine Academy (PMMA).

He was employed in the Comandancia de Marina in Manila as oficial segundo, which is a senior position for a clerk.

He married Josefa Inocencio, the cousin of Maximo Inocencio (one of the thirteen martyrs of Cavite). They had two children: Cristina Luz and Lucio. After his death, his son Lucio would adopt the surname Torres.

== La Liga Filipina ==
Basa was a member of the La Liga Filipina and used the name Baesa Bata.

Basa would support Marcelo H. Del Pilar in secretly propagating the newspaper La Solidaridad. Copies of the newspaper and the novels of Jose Rizal, which were banned by the Spanish colonial government, would be sent from Hong Kong by Jose Ma. Basa, smuggled on ships that made weekly trips, and received in Manila by Roman Basa.

== Katipunan ==
Basa and Ladislao Diwa lived in the same boarding house. Diwa was then a law student at the University of Santo Tomas and would become one of the founders of the Katipunan. Diwa recruited Basa into the organization and on November 9, 1892, Basa was initiated into the secret society under the name Liwanag (Light).

In 1893, Basa worked with Diwa to organize Katipunan in their home province of Cavite. In the same year, Basa was elected the second Supremo, or president, of the Katipunan. He introduced some changes in its operations, particularly the formation of a women's auxiliary section. He was in attendance during the "Katipunero" wedding ceremony of Andres Bonifacio and Gregoria de Jesus (this was either in 1892 or 1893, the year differs depending on sources), and on that same evening De Jesus was admitted to the Katipunan. While he was a member of the Supreme council, Basa published the paper/leaflet "Kalayaan" wherein he enumerated the "Rights of Man", the principles that inspired the French Revolution.

Basa refused reelection in 1894 because of the following differences with Katipunan co-founder Andrés Bonifacio: (1) Bonifacio's handling of the Katipunan's funds; (2) Basa wanted to remove the rituals and ceremonies that accompany initiation to the society or elevation in rank; and (3) Basa's refusal to induct his son Lucio into the Katipunan. Lucio was only a nine-year-old boy at the time who sometimes acted as courier to the Katipunan. Bonifacio insisted on making Lucio a member as the Spaniards will not suspect a boy to be a spy. Basa would also refuse to follow Bonifacio's instructions that Katipunan members provide photographs. According to an account by Tomas Remigio, he and Basa were among Bonifacio's critics who were sentenced to death by the Katipunan Secret Chamber. The Katipunan did not carry out these death sentences. Basa was also mentioned as one of those supposedly removed or expelled by the Supreme Assembly from the Katipunan in a meeting held on Nov. 1895. Roman Basa's tenure as Supremo differed depending on the source. Some accounts say he was replaced by Bonifacio in 1894, while others record that he was Supremo until 1895.

The Katipunan was uncovered in July 1896, and Basa was arrested for sedition and treason in September 1896. Basa was also one of those suspected of being a member of the Masonry. After being convicted by a Spanish military court, he was executed by musketry on February 6, 1897, along with Apolonio de la Cruz, Teodoro Plata, Vicente Molina, Hermenegildo de los Reyes, José Trinidad, Pedro Nicodemus, Feliciano del Rosario, Gervasio Samson and Doroteo Domínguez.
