= Katipunan =

Filipino secret society during the Spanish colonization

- Supreme and Venerable Association of the Children of the Nation
- Kataas-taasang, Kagalang-galangang Katipunan ng mga Anak ng Bayan
- Flag of the Katipunan
- Abbreviation: KKK
- Nickname: Katipunan
- Predecessor: La Liga Filipina
- Successor: Tejeros Government
- Formation: July 7, 1892
- Founders: Deodato Arellano, Andrés Bonifacio, Valentín Díaz, Ladislao Diwa, José Dizon, Teodoro Plata, and Danilo D. Azarcon
- Founded at: Calle Azcárraga, San Nicolas, Manila
- Dissolved: March 22, 1897
- Purpose: Filipino independence
- Location: Philippine Islands
- Members: 30,000
- Official language: Tagalog, Spanish
- Supreme President: Deodato Arellano (1892–1893); Román Basa (1893–1895); Andrés Bonifacio (1895–1897)
- Main organ: Kalayaan (1896)

Katipunan (lit. 'Association'), officially known as the Kataas-taasang, Kagalang-galangang Katipunan ng mga Anak ng Bayan (Note: Also spelled as Kataastaasang, Kagalanggalang na Katipunan ng mga Anak ng Bayan.) (lit. 'Supreme and Venerable Association of the Children of the Nation'; Spanish: Suprema y Venerable Asociación de los Hijos del Pueblo) and abbreviated as the KKK, was a revolutionary organization founded in 1892 by a group of Filipino nationalists: Deodato Arellano, Andrés Bonifacio, Valentin Diaz, Ladislao Diwa, José Dizon and Teodoro Plata. Its primary objective was achieving independence from the Spanish Empire through an armed revolution. It was formed as a secret society before its eventual discovery by Spanish authorities in August 1896. This discovery led to the start of the Philippine Revolution.

Historians generally place the date of its founding in July 1892 shortly after the arrest and deportation of Filipino author and nationalist José Rizal to Dapitan in Mindanao. Rizal was one of the founders of the nascent La Liga Filipina, which aimed for a Filipino representation to the Spanish Parliament. Many members of the Katipunan, including Bonifacio himself, were members of that organization. However, recent discovery of documents of the organization suggest that the Katipunan may have been around by January 1892 but became active by July.

Being originally formed as a secret society, the Katipunan had its members undergo through initiation rites similar to freemasonry. Membership to the organization was initially open only to men; however, women were eventually accepted. The Katipunan had a short-lived publication, Kalayaan (lit. 'Freedom'), which only saw printing in March 1896. During its existence, revolutionary ideals and works flourished, and Filipino literature was expanded by some of its prominent members.

Existing documents suggest that the Katipunan had planned for an armed revolution since its founding, and initially sought support from Filipino intellectuals. In one such incident, Bonifacio planned a rescue for the deported José Rizal in Dapitan in exchange for his support to the revolution, to which Rizal refused. An attempt to secure firearms from a visiting Japanese warship in May 1896 failed to gain anything. In August of that year, Spanish authorities in Manila discovered the organization. Days after, the Katipunan, led by Bonifacio, openly declared war to the Spanish government, starting a three-year long revolution, which marked the beginning of the creation of the nation of the Philippines.

== Etymology ==
The name "Katipunan" is a short name for "Kataas-taasang, Kagalang-galangang Katipunan ng mga Anak ng Bayan" (Supreme and Venerable Society of the Children of the Nation). The Tagalog word "katipunan" (literally, "association", "gathering", "assemblage", or "group") comes from the root word "tipon", a Tagalog word meaning "gathering" or "to gather".

== Formation ==
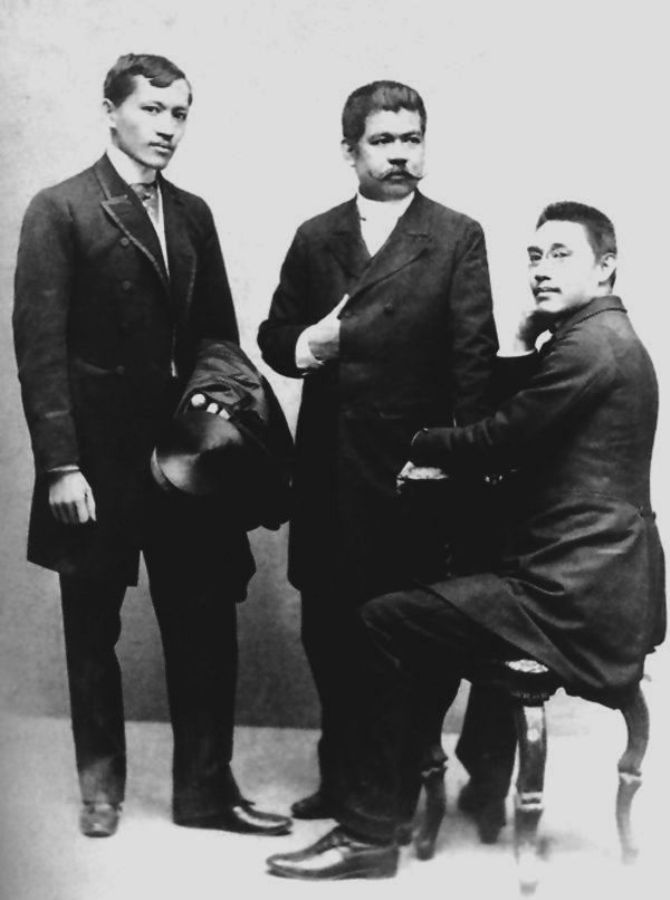
Prominent leaders of the Propaganda Movement in Spain: (from left to right) José Rizal, Marcelo H. del Pilar and Mariano Ponce

The Katipunan was formed in 1892 by Filipino nationalists Deodato Arrellano, Teodoro Plata, Valentin Diaz, Ladislao Diwa, Andres Bonifacio, and Jose Dizon. It was one of the two groups that was formed after the dissolution of the nascent La Liga Filipina, a nationalist organization formed by Filipino writer Jose Rizal and members of the Propaganda Movement in Spain, following Rizal's arrest and deportation to Dapitan in Mindanao. Most of the Katipunan's early members were also members of La Liga. However, while La Liga advocated for a Filipino representation in the Spanish Parliament, Katipunan's goal was for the archipelago to achieve independence through an armed revolution. Its founders saw that any move for Filipino autonomy from within Spain would be suppressed by colonial Spanish authorities. The other group, Cuerpo de Compromisarios, argued for a peaceful reformation instead. While fundamentally different in their views, the Katipunan decided to name Rizal as their honorary president. Rizal's status was so prominent within the organization that "Rizal" was one of the passwords of the group alongside "Gomburza", a trio of Filipino priests executed in Bagumbayan in 1872 the wake of the Cavite mutiny.

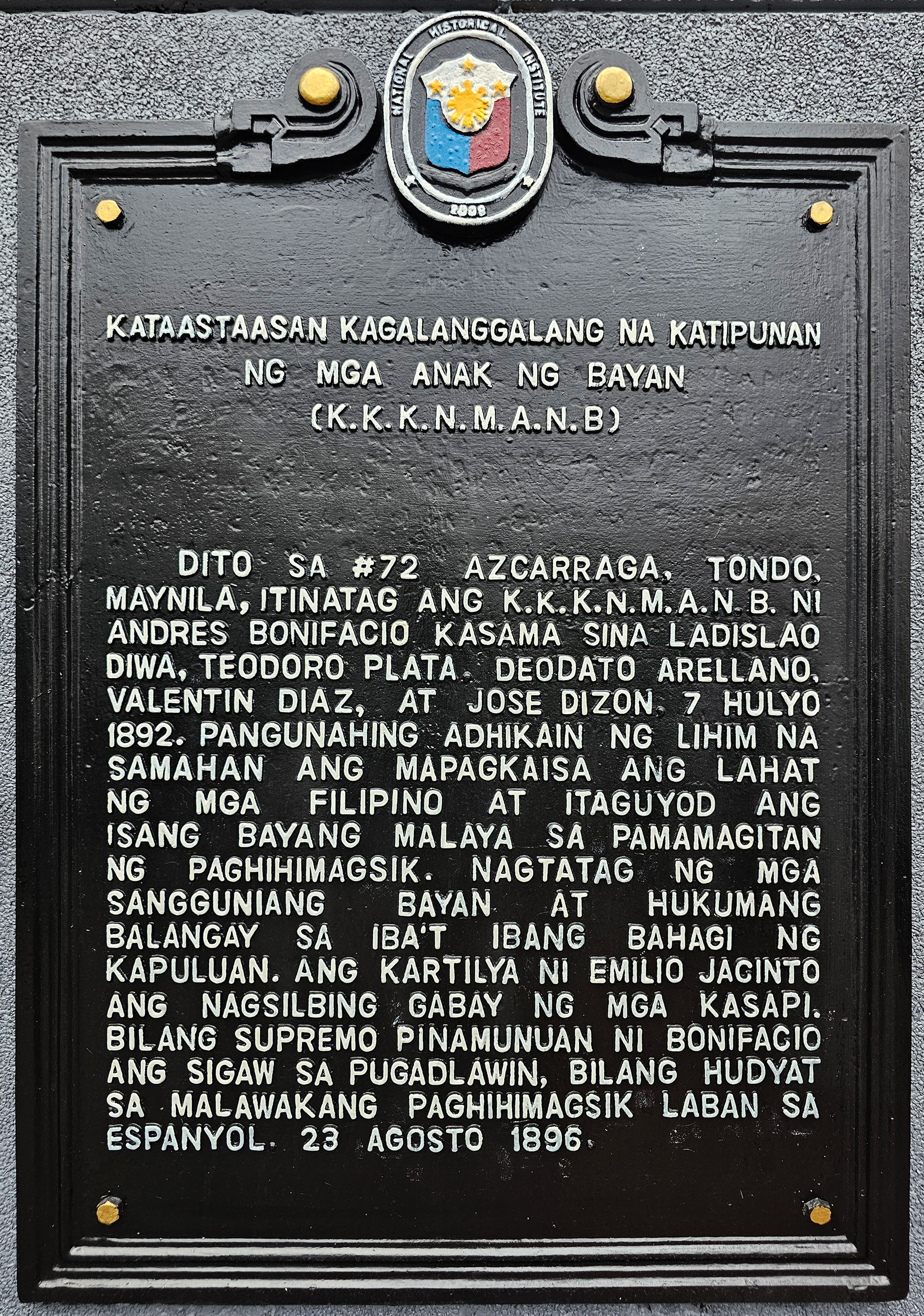
National historical marker installed in 2008 at the vicinity of the founding site

Modern historical consensus generally places Katipunan's formation on the night of July 7, 1892, following Rizal's arrest. It was formed in secrecy on a house in Azcarraga Street (now Recto Avenue) in San Nicolas, Manila. However, it may have been formed on paper as early as January of the same year based on recent documents discovered in the 21st century.

The organization was originally formed as a secret society following freemasonic practices such as its initiation rites and its organizational structure. This may have come from the fact that many of its early members were freemasons themselves. While not directly involved in the organization, prominent Filipino freemason Marcelo H. del Pilar may have influenced the group. Del Pilar is also said to have approved the Katipunan statutes. Filipino historian Epifanio de los Santos, in the 1920s, noted, "It is very correctly stated that Andrés Bonifacio ordered Teodoro Plata to draw up the statutes of the Katipunan, and that he did this with the aid of Ladislao Diwa and Valentín Diaz. After the statutes had been discussed, Bonifacio, with the concurrence of Deodato Arellano, submitted them to Marcelo H. del Pilar for approval. Upon the latter's letter approving the statutes, Bonifacio used the same for the purpose of gaining adepts."

== Organization ==
Supreme and Venerable Association of the Children of the Nation Kataastaasang Kagalanggalang na Katipunan ng mga Anak ng Bayan
- President: Andrés Bonifacio (1893–1896, until discovery)
- Secretary-General: Emilio Jacinto
- Founded: July 7, 1892
- Headquarters: Tondo, Manila or San Nicolas, Manila;
- Newspaper: Kalayaan
- Ideology: Anti-imperialism; Filipino nationalism Anti-Spanish sentiment Philippine independence Republicanism; Secularism; Freemasonry
- Political position: Big tent
- International affiliation: La Liga Filipina
- Colors: Red and white
- Slogan: Kapayapaan, Kalayaan, Katarungan

Party flag

=== Administration ===
The Katipunan was governed by the Supreme Council (Tagalog: Kataas-taasang Sanggunian). The first Supreme Council of the Katipunan was formed around August 1892, a month after the founding of the society. The Supreme Council was headed by an elected president (pangulo), followed by the secretary/secretaries (kalihim), the treasurer (tagaingat-yaman) and the fiscal (tagausig). The Supreme Council also had its councilors (kasangguni); the number varied through presidencies. To distinguish from presidents of lower sanggunian or councils (below), the president of the Supreme Council was called the Supreme President (Tagalog: Kataas-taasang Pangulo; Spanish: Presidente Supremo).

Office	Name	Term
Supreme President	Deodato Arellano	1892 – February 1893
Supreme President	Roman Basa	February 1893 – January 1895
Supreme President	Andrés Bonifacio	January 1895 – 1896
Comptroller/Intervenor	Andrés Bonifacio	1892 – August 1893
Fiscal	Ladislao Diwa	1892 – February 1893
Fiscal	Andrés Bonifacio	February 1893 – 1895
Fiscal	Emilio Jacinto	1895
Fiscal	Pio Valenzuela	December 1895
Secretary (of State after 1895)	Teodoro Plata	1892 – February 1893
Secretary (of State after 1895)	Jose Turiano Santiago	February 1893 – December 1895
Secretary (of State after 1895)	Emilio Jacinto	December 1895 – 1896
Secretary of War	Teodoro Plata	1896
Secretary of Justice	Briccio Pantas	1896
Secretary of Interior	Aguedo del Rosario	1896
Secretary of Finance	Enrique Pacheco	1896
Treasurer	Valentin Diaz	1892 – February 1893
Treasurer	Vicente Molina	February 1893 – December 1895
Financier	Darilyo Valino	1892

At the outbreak of the 1896 Revolution, the council was further reorganized into a 'cabinet' which the Katipunan regarded as a genuine revolutionary government, de facto and de jure.

In each province where there were Katipunan members, a provincial council called Sangguniang Bayan was established and in each town was an organized popular council called Sangguniang Balangay. Each bayan and balangay had its own set of elected officials: pangulo (president); kalihim (secretary); tagausig (fiscal); tagaingat-yaman (treasurer); pangalawang pangulo (vice president); pangalawang kalihim (vice secretary); mga kasangguni (councilors); mabalasig (terrible brother); taliba (guard); maniningil (collector/auditor); tagapamahala ng basahan ng bayan (custodian of the people's library); tagapangasiwa (administrator); manunulat (clerk); tagatulong sa pagsulat (assistant clerk); tagalaan (warden) and tagalibot (patroller). Each balangay was given a chance to expand their own spheres of influence through the triangle system in order to elevate their status to Sangguniang Bayan. Every balangay that did not gain Sangguniang Bayan status was dissolved and annexed by greater provincial or popular councils.

The towns/cities which supported the Katipunan cause were given symbolic names, such as Magdiwang (to celebrate) for Noveleta; Magdalo (to come) for Kawit; Magwagi (to win) for Naic; Magtagumpay (to succeed) for Maragondon; Walangtinag (never-diminished) for Indang and Haligue (wall) for Imus–all are in the province of Cavite.

Within the society functioned a secret chamber, called Camara Reina, which was presided over by Bonifacio, Jacinto and Pío Valenzuela. This mysterious chamber passed judgment upon those who had betrayed their oath and those accused of certain offenses penalized by Katipunan laws. Every katipunero stood in fearful awe of this chamber. According to José P. Santos, throughout the existence of the secret chamber, about five katipuneros were convicted and sentenced to die by it. The death sentence was handed down in the figure of a cup with a serpent coiled around it.

=== History of administration ===
In 1892, after the Katipunan was founded, the members of the Supreme Council consisted of Arellano as president, Bonifacio as comptroller, Diwa as fiscal, Plata as secretary and Díaz as treasurer.

In 1893, the Supreme Council comprised Ramón Basa as president, Bonifacio as fiscal, José Turiano Santiago as secretary, Vicente Molina as treasurer and Restituto Javier, Briccio Pantas, Teodoro Gonzales. Gonzales, Plata and Diwa were councilors. It was during Basa's term that the society organized a women's auxiliary section. Two of its initial members were Gregoria de Jesús, whom Bonifacio had just married, and Marina Dizon, daughter of José Dizon. It was also in 1893 when Basa and Diwa organized the provincial council of Cavite, which would later be the most successful council of the society.

The Filipino scholar Maximo Kalaw reports that Basa yielded the presidency to Bonifacio in 1894 because of a dispute over the usefulness of the initiation rites and Bonifacio's handling of the society's funds. Basa contested Bonifacio's practice of lending their funds to needy members, complete with promissory notes. Moreover, Basa refused to induct his son into the organization.

It was also in 1894 when Emilio Jacinto, a nephew of Dizon who was studying law at the University of Santo Tomas, joined the Katipunan. He intellectualized the society's aims and formulated the principles of the society as embodied in its primer, called Kartilla. It was written in Tagalog and all recruits were required to commit it to heart before they were initiated. Jacinto would later be called the Brains of the Katipunan.

At the same time, Jacinto also edited Kalayaan (Freedom), the society's official organ, but only one edition of the paper was issued; a second was prepared but never printed due to the discovery of the society. Kalayaan was published through the printing press of the Spanish newspaper Diario de Manila. This printing press and its workers would later play an important role in the outbreak of the revolution.

In 1895, José Turiano Santiago, a close personal friend of Bonifacio, was expelled because a coded message from the Katipunan fell into the hands of a Spanish priest teaching at the University of Santo Tomas. Since the priest was a friend of Santiago's sister, he and his half-brother Restituto Javier were suspected of betrayal, but the two would remain loyal to the Katipunan and Santiago would even join the Philippine revolutionary forces in the Philippine–American War. Jacinto replaced Santiago as secretary.

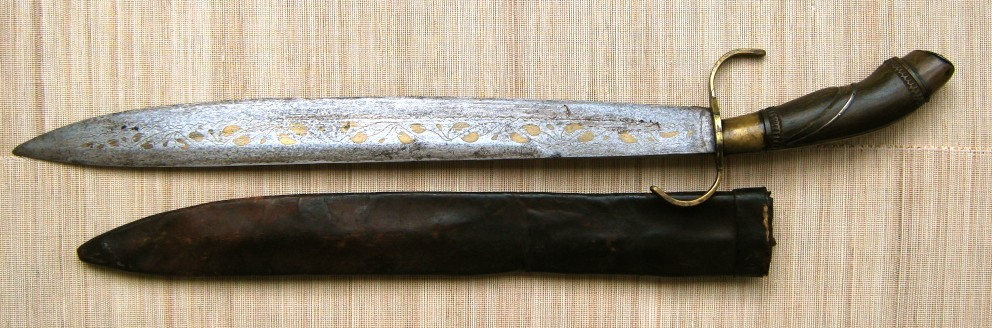
A Katipunan officer's sword

In early 1895, Bonifacio called for a meeting of the society and deposed Basa in an election that installed Bonifacio as president, Jacinto as fiscal, Santiago as secretary, Molina as secretary, Pío Valenzuela and Pantaleon Torres as physicians and Aguedo del Rosario and Doreteo Trinidad as councilors.

On December 31, 1895, another election named Bonifacio as president, Jacinto as fiscal, Santiago as secretary, Molina as secretary, Pío Valenzuela and Pantaleon Torres as physicians and Aguedo del Rosario and Doreteo Trinidad as councilors.

The members of the Supreme Council in 1895 were Bonifacio as president, Valenzuela as fiscal and physician, Jacinto as secretary and Molina as treasurer. Enrico Pacheco, Pantaleon Torres, Balbino Florentino, Francisco Carreón and Hermenegildo Reyes were named councilors.

Eight months later, in August 1896, the fifth and last supreme council was elected to rename offices. Bonifacio was named president, Jacinto as secretary of state, Plata as secretary of war, Bricco Pantas as secretary of justice, Aguedo del Rosario as secretary of the interior and Enrico Pacheco as secretary of finance.

=== Members ===
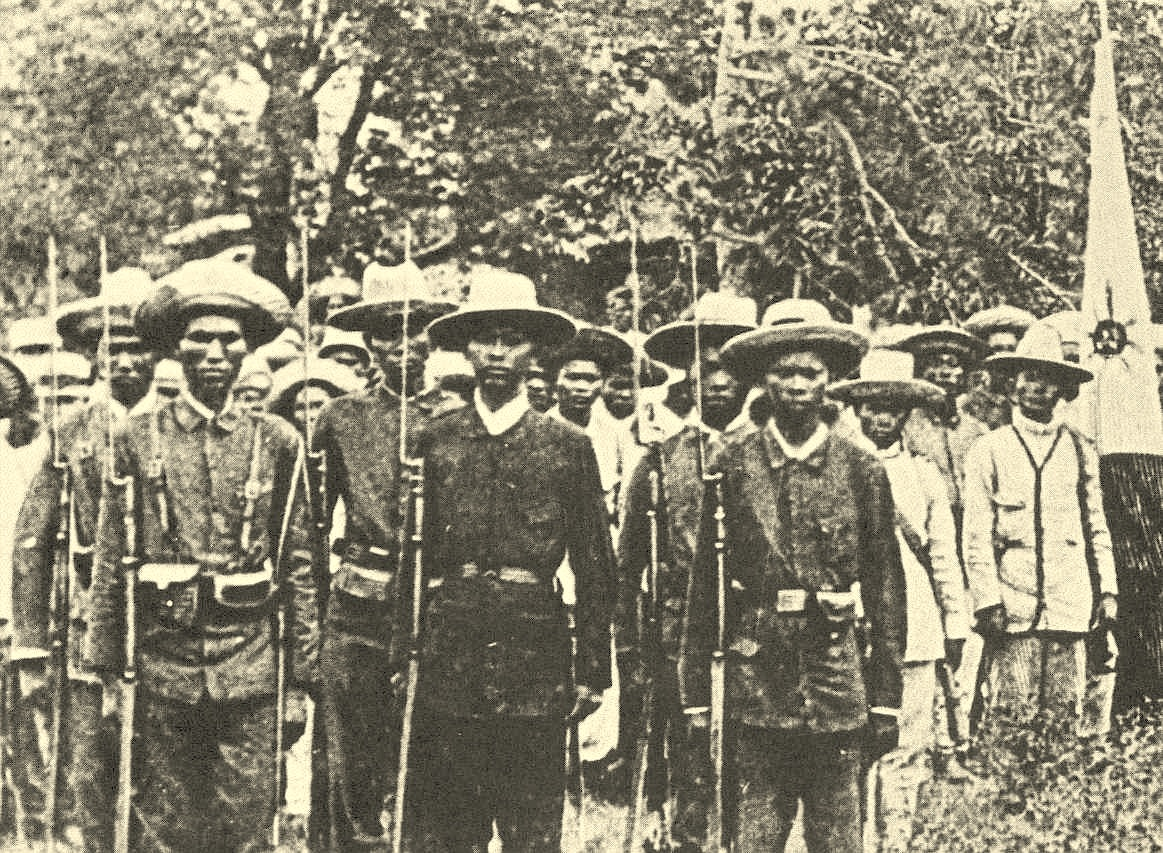
A late 19th-century photograph of armed Filipino revolutionaries, formerly known as Katipuneros

Over the next four years, the Katipunan founders would recruit new members. By the time the society was uncovered, the American writer James Le Roy estimated the strength of the Katipunan at 100,000 to 400,000 members. Historian Teodoro Agoncillo estimated that the membership had increased to around 30,000 by 1896. The Ilocano writer Isabelo de los Reyes estimated membership at 15,000 to 50,000.

Aside from Manila, the Katipunan also had sizeable chapters in Batangas, Laguna, Cavite, Rizal, Bulacan, Pampanga, Tarlac and Nueva Ecija. There were also smaller chapters in Ilocos Sur, Ilocos Norte, Pangasinan and the Bicol region. The Katipunan founders spent their free time recruiting members. For example, Diwa, who was a clerk at a judicial court, was assigned to the office of a justice of the peace in Pampanga. He initiated members in that province as well as Bulacan, Tarlac, and Nueva Ecija. Most of the Katipuneros were plebeian although several wealthy patriots joined the society and submitted themselves to the leadership of Bonifacio.

Katipunero (plural, mga Katipunero) is the demonym of a male member of the Katipunan. Katipunera (plural, mga Katipunera) refers to female members.

=== Triangle system and grades ===
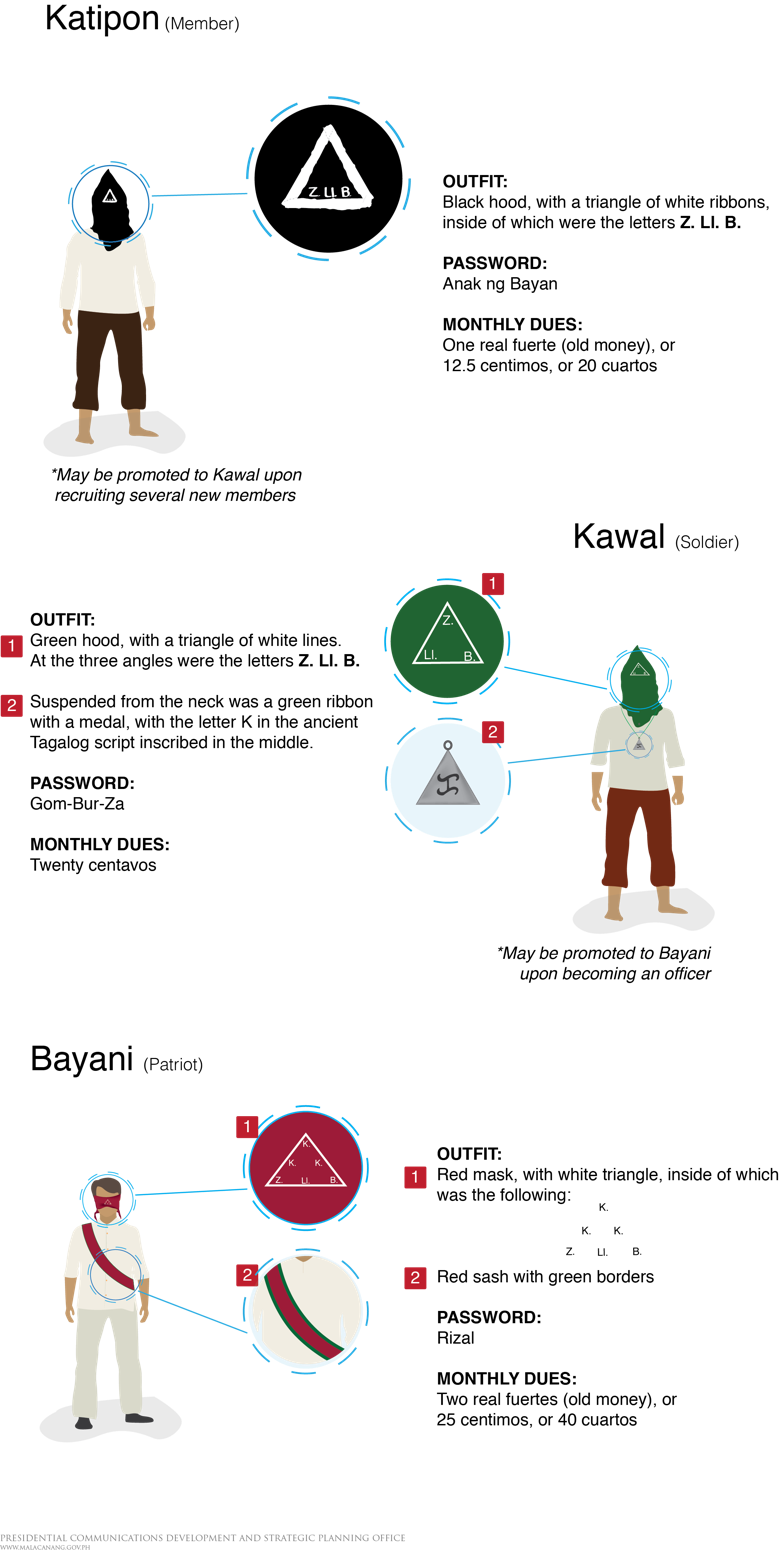
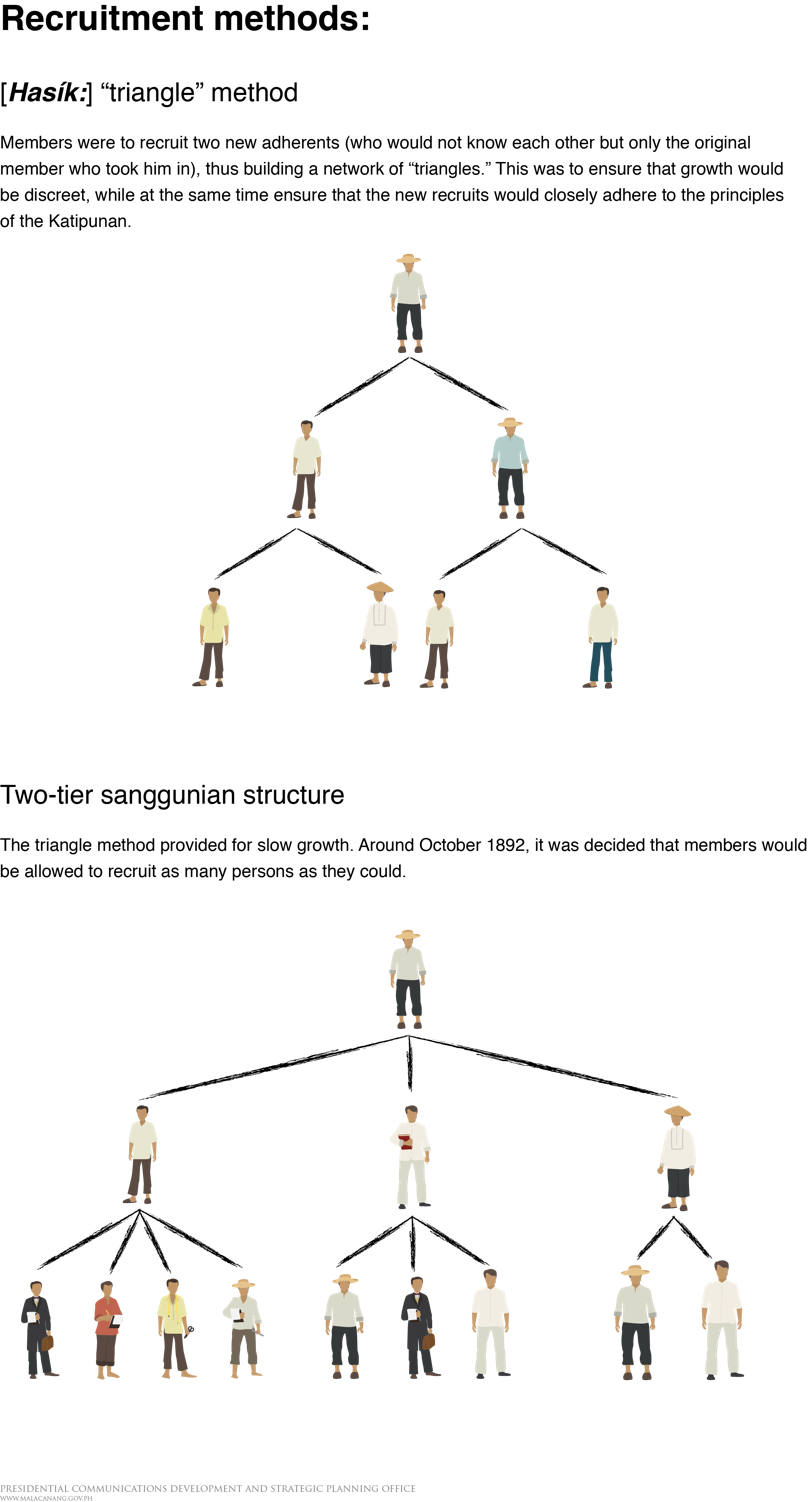
Two infographs depicting the ranks within the Katipunan and the triangle system of recruitment

It was the original plan of Bonifacio to increase the membership of the Katipunan by means of sistemang patatsulok or the triangle system. He formed his first triangle with his two comrades, Teodoro Plata and Ladislao Diwa. Each of them re-instituted Katipunan thoughts into another two new converts. The founder of the triangle knew the other two members, but the latter did not know each other. In December 1892 the system was abolished after proving it to be clumsy and complicated. A new system of initiation, modelled after the Masonic rites was then adopted.

When the Katipuneros had expanded to more than a hundred members, Bonifacio divided the members into three grades: the Katipon (literally: Associate) which is the lowest rank, the Kawal (soldier), and the Bayani (Hero or Patriot). At the meeting of the society, Katipon wore a black hood with a triangle of white ribbon having the letters "Z. Ll. B.", corresponding to the roman "A. N. B.", meaning Anak ng̃ Bayan (Son of the People, see below). Kawal wore a green hood with a triangle having white lines and the letters "Z. LL. B." at the three angles of the triangle, and also wore a green ribbon with a medal with the letter (ka) in Baybayin script above a depiction of a crossed sword and flag. The password was Gom-Bur-Za, taken from the names of the three martyrs Mariano Gomez, Jose Burgos and Jacinto Zamora. Bayani (Hero) wore a red mask and a sash with green borders, symbolizing courage and hope. The front of the mask had white borders that formed a triangle with three Ks arranged as if occupying the angles of a triangle within a triangle, and with the letters "Z. Ll. B." below. Another password was Rizal. Countersigns enabled members to recognize one another on the street. A member meeting another member placed the palm of his right hand on his breast and, as he passed the other member, he closed the hands to bring the right index finger and thumb together.

Color designations:

- Katipon. First-degree members. Other symbols: Black hood, revolver and/or bolo.
- Kawal. Second-degree members. Other symbols: green ribboned-medallion with Malayan K inscription.
- Bayani. Third degree members. Other symbols: Red hood and sash, with green borders.

Katipon could graduate to Kawal class by bringing several new members into the society. A Kawal could become a Bayani upon being elected an officer of the society.

==== Membership ====
Any person who wished to join the Katipunan was subjected to certain initiation rites, resembling those of Masonic rites, to test his courage, patriotism and loyalty. New recruits underwent the initiation rite three at a time so that no member knew more than two other members of the society. The neophyte was first blindfolded and then led into a dimly lighted room with black curtains where his folded cloth was removed from his eyes. An admonition, in Tagalog, was posted at the entrance to the room:

Original text	Modern Manila Tagalog translation	English translation
Kung may lakás at tapang, ikáw'y makatutuloy! Kung ang pag-uusisa ang nagdalá sa iyó dito'y umurong ka. Kung 'di ka marunong pumigil ng̃ iyong masasamang hilig, umurong ka; kailan man ang pintuan ng̃ May-kapangyarihan at Kagalanggalang Katipunan ng̃ mg̃á Anak ng̃ Baya'y Hindi bubuksan nang dahil sa iyó.	Kung may lakas at tapang, makakatuloy ikaw! Kung ang pag-uusisa ang nagdala sa iyo dito (ay) umurong ka. Kung 'di ka marunong pumigil ng iyong masasamang hilig, umurong ka; kailan man, ang pintuan ng Makapangyarihan at Kagalanggalang na Katipunan ng mga Anak ng Bayan ay Hindi bubuksan nang dahil sa iyo.	If you have strength and valor, you can proceed! If what has brought you here is only curiosity—go away! If you cannot control your vices, retire. Never shall the doors of the Supreme and Venerable Society of the Sons of the People be opened to you.

Inside the candle-lit room, they would be brought to a table adorned with a skull and a bolo. There, they would condemn the abuses of the Spanish government and vow to fight colonial oppression:

1. Anó ang kalagayan nitóng Katagalugan noóng unang panahón? (In what condition did the Spaniards find the Tagalog land when they came?)

(Expected answer) "When the Spaniards came to the Philippine shores on March 16, 1521, the Filipinos were already in a civilized state. They had freedom of government; they had artillery; they had silk dresses; they had carried on commerce with neighboring countries in Asia; they had their own religion and their own script. In short, they had liberty and independence."

2. Anó ang kalagayan sa ngayón? (In what condition do they find themselves now?)

(Expected answer) "The friars have not really civilized the Filipinos, since enlightenment was contrary to the friars' interests. The Filipinos (called Tagalogs by the Katipunan) were merely superficially taught formulas of Catechism for which they eventually paid numerous costly fiestas for the benefit of the friars."

3. Anó ang magiging kalagayan sa daratíng na panahón? (What hopes do they have for the future?)

(Expected answer) "With faith, valor, and perseverance, these evils will be remedied."

During Bonifacio's time, all of the Filipino people are referred collectively by the Katipunan as Tagalogs, while the Philippines is referred to as the Katagalugan.

The next step in the initiation ceremony was the lecture given by the master of ceremonies, called Mabalasig/Mabalasik (terrible brother), who informed the neophyte to withdraw if he lacked courage since he would be out of place in the patriotic society. If the neophyte persisted, he was presented to the assembly of the brethren, who subjected him to various ordeals such as blindfolding him and making him shoot a supposedly a revolver at a person, or forcing him to jump over a supposedly hot flame. After the ordeals came to final rite—the pacto de sangre or blood compact—in which the neophyte signed the following oath with the blood taken from his arm:

Ako'y si ______________, Nanunumpa sa ngalan ng Dios at ng bayan na ipagtatanggol nang buong katapangan ang mga kadahilanan ng K.K.K. ng mga A. ng B., ingatan ang kaniyang lihim na mamasdan at mapakinggan, sundin siya ng pikit -mata, saklolohan ang lahat na mga kasama sa lahat na panganib at pagkakailangan nila, Nanunumpa at nangangako rin naman ako na mag-pitagan sa kanilang mga Pinuno, huag na magtaksil sa kanilang mga kautusan at bilin at tatalaan kong aking dugo na kusang ibububo dito sa kasulatang hinaharap.

I,_______________, swear in the name of God and to the country to defend the cause of the K.K.K. of the A. of B., with all my courage, to keep secret whatever I witness and hear, to follow orders blindly, and to support all my brethren against every danger and exigency. I also swear and pledge to respect the leaders, not to betray them, their orders of instructions, and so I attest with my blood, which is shed here in this document.

He was then accepted as a full-fledged member, with a symbolic name by which he was known within Katipunan circles. Bonifacio's symbolic name was Maypagasa; Jacinto was Pingkian and Artemio Ricarte was Vibora.

==== Admission of women to the society ====
At first, Katipunan was purely a patriotic society for men. Owing to the growing suspicion of the women regarding nocturnal absences of their husbands, the reduction of their monthly earnings and "long hours of work", Bonifacio had to bring them into the realms of the KKK. A section for women was established in the society: to become admitted, one must be a wife, a daughter, or a sister of a male katipunero. It was estimated that from 20 to 50 women had become members of the society.

The first woman to become a member of the Katipunan was Gregoria de Jesús, wife of Bonifacio. Her codename was Lakambini (Princess). Initially, there were 29 women were admitted to the Katipunan: Gregoria de Jesús, Marina Dizon, president of the women's section; Josefa and Trinidad Rizal, sisters of Dr. José Rizal; Angelica Lopez and Delfina Herbosa Natividad, close relatives of Dr. Rizal; Carmén de Rodriguez; Marina Hizon; Benita Rodriguez; Semiona de Rémigio; Gregoria Montoya; Agueda Kahabagan, Teresa Magbanua, Trinidad Tecson, rendered as "Mother of Biak-na-Bato"; Nazaria Lagos; Patrocinio Gamboa; Marcela Agoncillo; Melchora Aquino, the "Grand Old Woman of Balintawak"; Marta Saldaña and Macaria Pañgilinan.

The women rendered valuable services to the Katipunan. They guarded the secret papers and documents of the society. Whenever the Katipunan held sessions in a certain house, they usually made merry, singing and dancing with some of the men in the living room so that the civil guard were led that there was nothing but a harmless social party within.

Though women are considered to be members of the Katipunan, information regarding the women's section was scarce and sometimes conflicting. Teodoro Agoncillo, for example, disregarded Marina Dizon and concluded that Josefa Rizal was the only president of the said section. Gregorio Zaide, on the other hand, mentioned Dizon's presidency in his 1939 publication History of the Katipunan but changed his mind when he adopted Dr. Pío Valenzuela's notion that women-members did not elect officers, hence there was no room for a president.

==== Foreign members of the Katipunan ====
Attracted by the universal appeal of the Katipunan's Kartilya, several members who were not native Filipinos joined the Katipunan or, later, the Philippine Revolutionary Army (PRA) in the spirit of national liberation. Among the foreign-born Katipuneros were General Juan Cailles, a half Indian (From India) and French mestizo; General Jose Ignacio Paua, a full-blooded Chinese; African-American PRA Captain David Fagen who defected from the Americans to join the Filipinos due to his disgust of racism and imperialism; Captain Camillo Richairdi, an Italian who joined the rebel Filipinos; and Vicente Catalan, a Cuban Criollo captain who became the first Admiral of the Philippine Navy. A large number of former Latin-American officers in the Spanish army from Mexico, Colombia, Venezuela, Peru, Chile, Argentina, and Costa Rica were dismissed in the context of the Andres Novales uprising, one of the precursors of the Philippine revolution. These Latin-American-born officers moved to the Philippines to serve in the military and were allied with the revolutionaries. There were also several Spanish and American defectors to the Philippine side during the Philippine War of Independence and the Philippine–American War. To add to these were the Japanese militants supporting the Katipunan and the First Republic among which included Lieutenant Saburo Nakamori and Captain Chizuno Iwamoto who served on President Emilio Aguinaldo's staff. Nevertheless, there was friction between the Masons from the United States and France against the Masonic associated Katipunan as the first president of the United States, George Washington was once a Mason, but the nascent First Philippine Republic which the Katipunan founded went to war against the same Masonic-led United States in the Philippine-American War, and furthermore, the treaty which sealed the American invasion of the Philippines was concluded in the 1898 Treaty of Paris. The Revolution and the Philippine–American War caused many deaths but eventually, America granted the Philippines Independence after World War 2.

==== Notable Katipuneros ====
- Andres Bonifacio (1863–1897) – The leading founder and the third supreme president (Kataas-taasang Pangulo, presidente supremo) of the Katipunan, later taking the title Pangulo ng Haring Bayang Katagalugan (president of the Sovereign Tagalog Nation; "Haring Bayan" was also translated as Republic, i.e. Republika ng Katagalugan) upon the start of the revolution.
- Emilio Aguinaldo (1869–1964) – First president of the First Philippine Republic, the Katipunan's successor. He was also a war general and one of the officers of the Magdalo chapter that led to many notable victories for the Katipunan against Spain. During his presidency, he ordered the arrest and eventual execution of Andrés and Procopio Bonifacio in 1897 after the trial.
- Emilio Jacinto (1875–1899) – called as the Brains of the Katipunan. He wrote several papers during the Revolution like the Kartilya (Primer).
- Mariano Álvarez (1818–1924) – the president of the Magdiwang chapter and a war general, he was also Oriang's uncle.
- Baldomero Aguinaldo (1818–1924) – the president of the Magdalo chapter and a war general, he was also Emilio Aguinaldo's first cousin.
- Gregoria de Jesús (1875–1943) – called as the Lakambini ng Katipunan (Muse of the Katipunan) and nicknamed Aling Oryang, she was the wife of Bonifacio before marrying Julio Nakpil after the former's death. She was also regarded as one of the first women members of the Katipunan.
- Gregorio del Pilar (1875–1899) – entered the Katipunan circle fighting against the Spanish and later the First Philippine Republic's army against the Americans. He died during the Battle of Tirad Pass.
- Pio del Pilar (1860–1931) – the leader of the Matagumpay chapter, one of the closest officers of Andrés Bonifacio. Despite this, as the new revolutionary government was established, he was one of the officers who advised Aguinaldo to reverse his commutation (to banishment) of the death sentences given to Andrés and Procopio Bonifacio.
- Licerio Gerónimo (1855–1924) – Aguinaldo's war general during Philippine–American War.
- Vicente Lukbán (1860–1916) – Americans regarded him to be the mastermind of the bloody Balangiga massacre in 1901 during Philippine–American War.
- Miguel Malvar y Carpio (1865–1911) – commander of the Katipunan and became a general of the First Philippine Republic.
- Macario Sakay (1878–1907) – head of Katipunan in Trozo, Manila. Future founder or rather reviver of the Republika ng Katagalugan (the concept and name dating back to Bonifacio) that would oppose American occupation in the Philippines.
- Paciano Rizal (1851–1930) – The older brother of national hero José Rizal, he was also a personal friend of Padre José Burgos in his youth. He joined the Katipunan years before Jose's return from Dapitan.
- Manuel Tinio (1877–1924) – youngest general of the Katipunan and the First Philippine Republic, he later became the governor of Nueva Ecija from 1907 to 1909.
- Aurelio Tolentino (1869–1915) – Filipino playwright, poet, journalist, and revolutionary. He wrote and directed the anti-imperialist play Kahapon, Ngayon at Bukas (Yesterday, Today and Tomorrow), which led to his arrest in 1903.
- Julián Felipe (1861–1944) – composer of Lupang Hinirang, teacher and member of La Liga Filipina, he later served as legal advisor to the Katipunan. His tenacious ability in argumentative reasoning earned him the nickname "demente viejo" among the colonial Principalía. In Manila, Julian ran a private law school in which many of his personal socio-political ideals succeeded to his students. Notable Katipuneros under his tutelage was Gregorio Aglipay and Miguel Malvar.
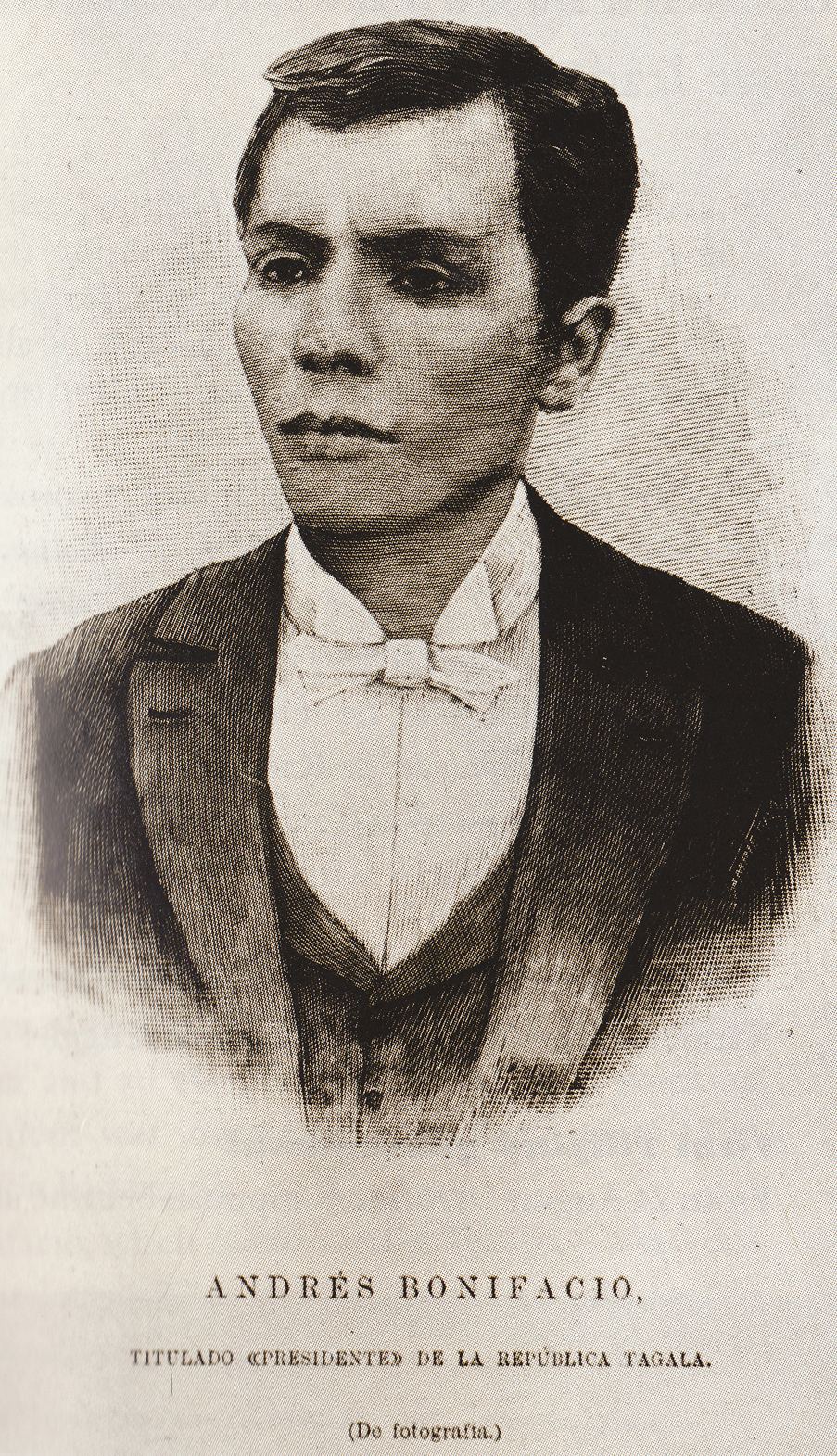
Andrés Bonifacio

Emilio Aguinaldo

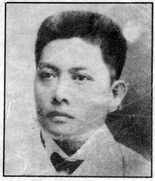
Santiago Alvarez

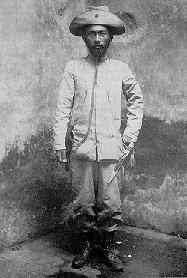
Miguel Malvar

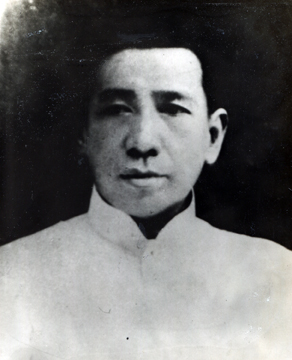
Ladislao Diwa

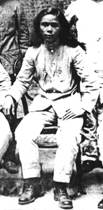
Macario Sakay

== Literature of the society ==
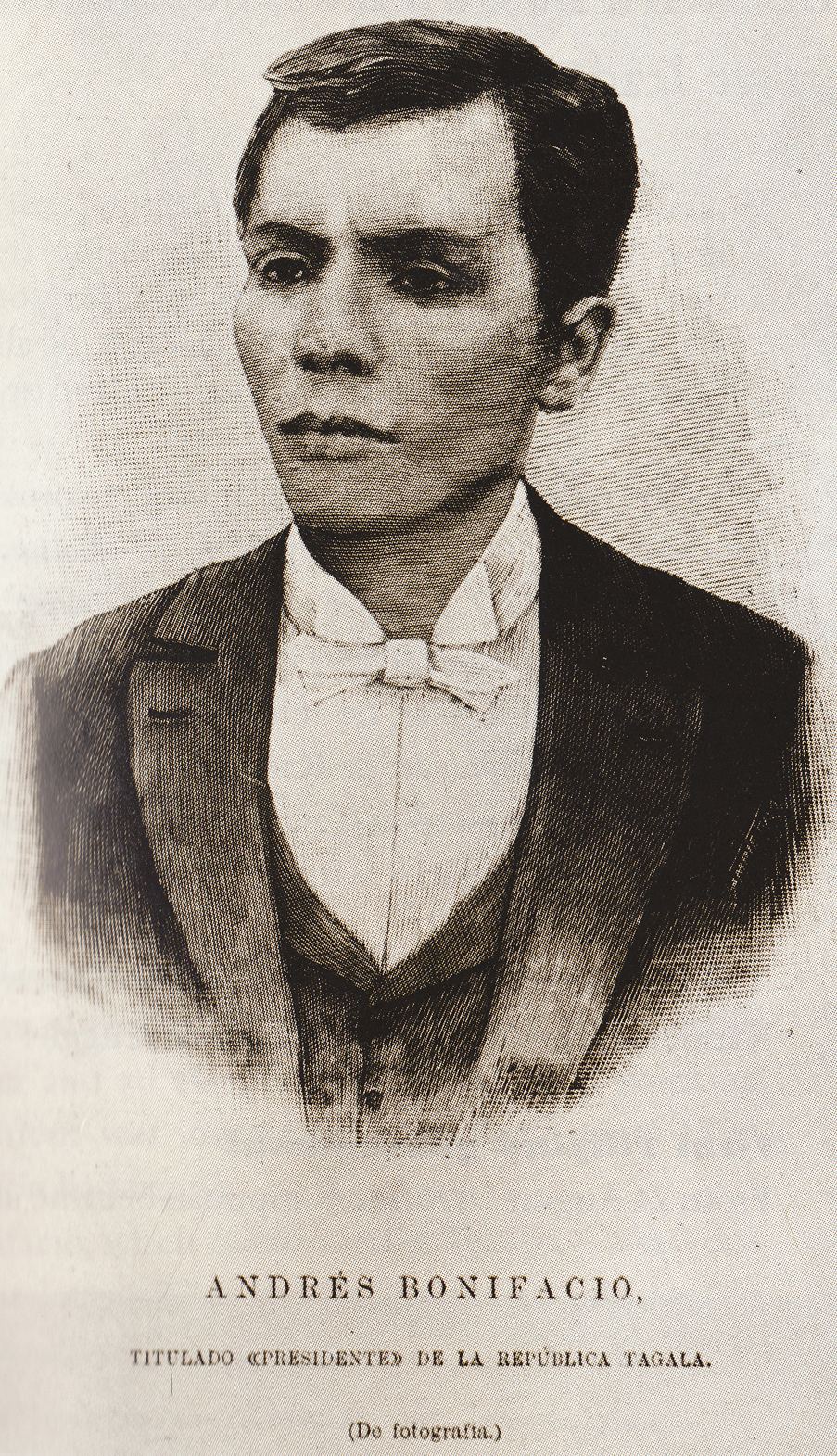
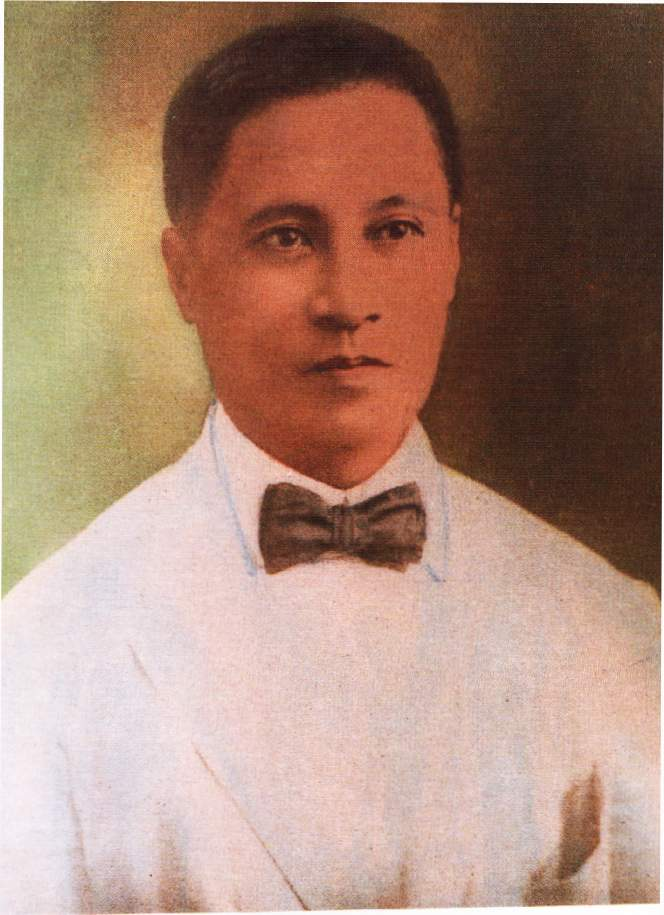
The triumvirate of Katipunan (from left to right): Bonifacio, Jacinto and Valenzuela.

=== Written works ===
During the Katipunan's existence, literature flourished through prominent writers of the Katipunan: Andrés Bonifacio, Emilio Jacinto and Dr. Pío Valenzuela. Each of the three works stirred patriotism and aimed to spread revolutionary thoughts and ideals of the society.

- Bonifacio works. Probably one of the best works done inside the Katipunan was written by Andrés Bonifacio, Pag-ibig sa Tinubuang Lupa (Love for the Homeland). It is a poem of sincere patriotic sentiment. Pag-ibig was published in the January 1896 issue of Kalayaan by Bonifacio under his pen name Agapito Bagumbayan. According to Manuel Artigas y Cuerva, the name Agapito Bagumbayan was a corruption of agap-ito, bagum-bayan, which, if translated from Tagalog to English word by word, means "the new nation is here and ready". There is no known original source of Pag-ibig, especially that there is no surviving Kalayaan issue. The two available texts accessible reprinted through books are the one published by Jose P. Santos in 1935. The other one, with familiar discrepancies to Santos' print, was archived in the military annals of Madrid.

After Rizal's execution at Bagumbayan on December 30, 1896, Bonifacio wrote the first Tagalog translation of the former's Mi último adiós (Final Farewell), in which he gave the name Pahimakas (Farewell). He also wrote the prose Katungkulang Gagawin ng mga Z. Ll. B. (Duties of the Sons of the People), that was never published because he believed that Jacinto's Kartilya was superior than his. Bonifacio also wrote Ang Dapat Mabatid ng Mga Tagalog (What the Tagalogs Should Know), which is a political-historical essay.

- Jacinto works. Emilio Jacinto is considered the Brains of the Katipunan, later of the Revolution. His poetical masterpiece, written in Laguna on October 8, 1897, was A la Patría (To My Fatherland), with an inspiring melody paralleled by Rizal's Mi último adiós. He also wrote a touching ode entitled A mí Madre (To My Mother). His masterpiece in prose, the Kartilya (Primer; see below), became the Bible of the Katipunan. His other prose writing was Liwanag at Dilim (Light and Darkness), a series of articles on human rights, liberty, equality, labor, government, and love of country. His pen name was Dimas-Ilaw.
- Valenzuela works. Dr. Pío Valenzuela was a medical doctor by profession. In 1896, during the first publication of Kalayaan, Valenzuela assisted Bonifacio and Jacinto in editing the newspaper. He also wrote Catuiran? (Is it Fair?), which described the cruelties of the Spanish priest and civil guards of San Francisco del Monte (now in Quezon City) on a helpless village lieutenant. He also collaborated with Bonifacio in writing the article Sa Mga Kababayan (To my Countrymen), an essay addressing the people of the Philippines. His pen name was Madlang-Away.

During the infamous Cry of Balintawak, Valenzuela held the position of physician-general of the Katipunan.

=== Kalayaan ===
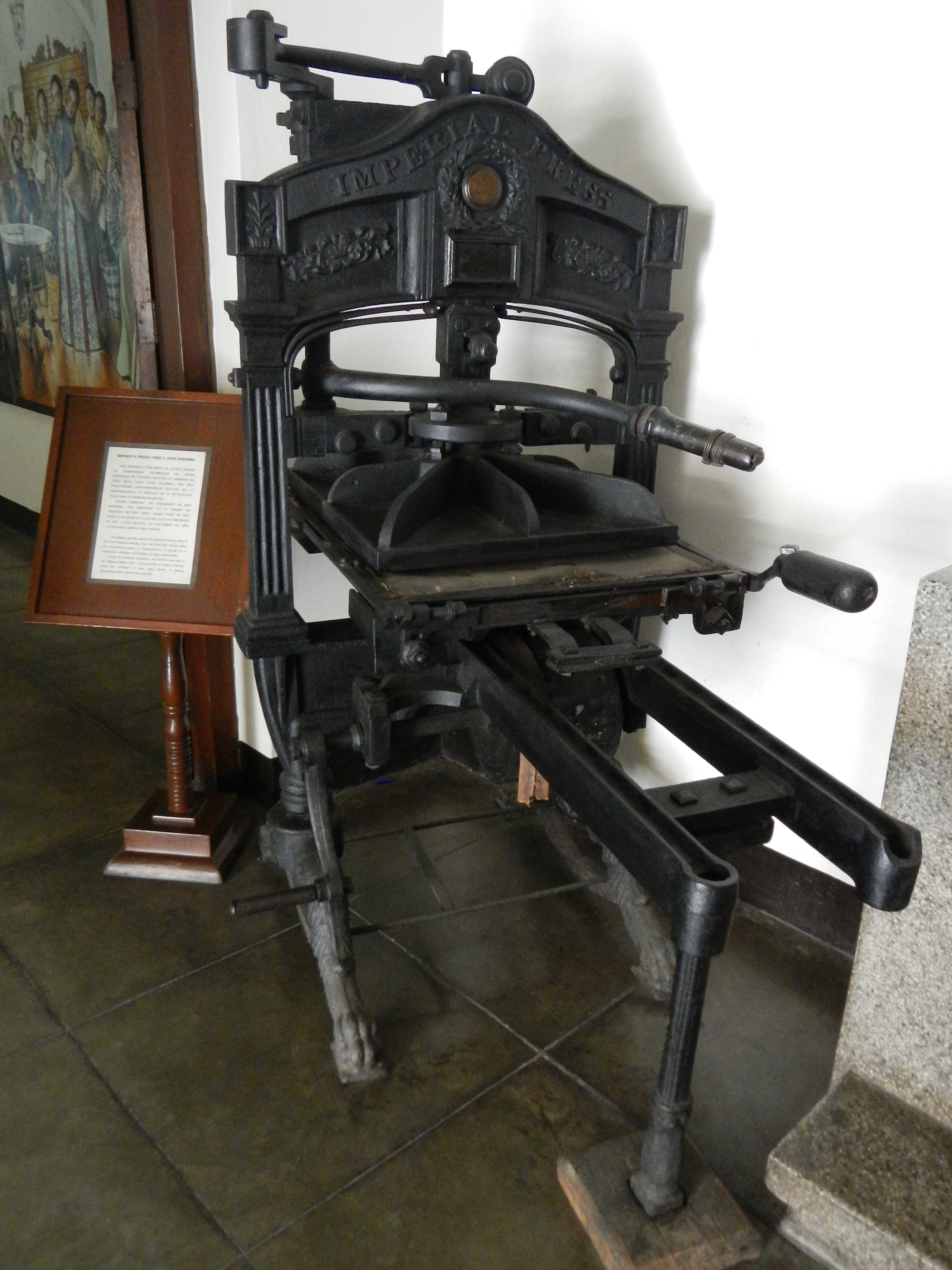
The printing machine used by the First Philippine Republic (now the Casa Real Shrine), where the newspapers La Independencia, El Heraldo de la Revolucion, Kalayaan, and Kaibingan ng Bayan were printed. During the Japanese occupation, the "Bulacan Military Area", under Captain Alejo Santos, used this machine, against the Japanese.

Kalayaan (Liberty/Freedom) was the official organ and newspaper of the Katipunan. It was first published March 1896 (even though its masthead was dated January 1896.) The first Kalayaan issue has never been followed.

In 1895, the Katipunan bought an old hand-press with money donated by two Visayan co-patriots Francisco del Castillo and Candido Iban, who had returned to the country after working as shell and pearl divers in Australia and had some money from a lottery win. They bought the press and a small quantity of types from Antonio Salazar's "Bazar del Cisne" on Calle Carriedo, and Del Castillo transported it to the house of Andrés Bonifacio in Santa Cruz, Manila. On January 1, 1896, Valenzuela accepted the position as the Katipunan "fiscal" in exchange for Bonifacio's consent to send the printing press to his house in Calle de Lavezares, San Nicolas, Manila, "so that he could assist and edit a monthly publication which would be the Katipunan's main organ". Bonifacio agreed, and on mid-January, the press was delivered in San Nicolas.

The name Kalayaan was suggested by Dr. Pío Valenzuela, which was agreed both by Bonifacio and Emilio Jacinto. Even though Valenzuela was chosen to become the editor of the organ, they all decided to use the name of Marcelo H. del Pilar as its editor. To fool the Spanish authorities, the Kalayaan was also decided to carry a false masthead stating that it was being printed in Yokohama, Japan.

That very same month, January 1896, the publication of Kalayaan began. Valenzuela expected to complete it by the end of the month and so it was dated as such. The existence of the press was kept in utmost secrecy. Under the supervision of Valenzuela, two printers, Faustino Duque, a student from Colegio de San Juan de Letran, and Ulpiano Fernández, a part-time printer at El Comercio, printed the revolutionary literature of the society and Kalayaan.

When Valenzuela was appointed physician-general of the Katipunan, he passed on his editorial duties to Jacinto. Jacinto edited the articles after his pre-law classes in University of Santo Tomas. Since the press was in the old orthography and not in the new "Germanized" alphabet, as called by the Spaniards, there were no Tagalog letters such as "k", "w", "h" and "y". To solve this problem, Jacinto obliged his mother, Josefa Dizon, to buy typefaces that resembled such letters. The typefaces used in its printing were purchased from publisher Isabelo de los Reyes, but many were taken surreptitiously from the presses of the Diario de Manila by Filipino employees who were also members of the Katipunan.

According to Valenzuela, the printing process was so laborious that setting up eight pages required two months to complete. For weeks, Jacinto, Duque and Fernández (and sometimes Valenzuela) took turns in preparing the pages of the Kalayaan, which were approximately nine by twelve inches in size.

In March 1896, the first copies of the January 1896 issue were secretly circulated with about 2,000 copies, according to Valenzuela. According to Epifanio de los Santos, only 1,000 copies were printed: 700 were distributed by Bonifacio, 300 by Aguinaldo, and some 100 by Valenzuela himself.

The first issue contained a supposed editorial done by del Pilar, which, in fact, was done by Jacinto himself. It also included Bonifacio's Pag-ibig sa Tinubuang Lupa, Valenzuela's Catuiran? and several works that exposed Spanish abuses and promoted patriotism. Copies spread to nearby Manila provinces, including Cavite, Morong (now Rizal), Kalookan, and Malabon. Surprised by this initial success, Jacinto decided to print a second issue that would contain nothing but his work.

In August 1896, the second issue was prepared. It was during this time that Spanish authorities began to grow wary of anti-government activities and, suspecting the existence of a subversive periodical in circulation (see below), raided the place where Kalayaan was being printed, at No. 6 Clavel Street, San Nicolas, Manila. Fortunately, the printers Duque and Fernández were warned in time, destroyed the incriminating molds and escaped. Therefore, Spanish authorities never found any evidence of the Kalayaan.

=== Kartilya ng Katipunan ===
The teachings of the Katipunan were embodied in a document entitled Kartilya ng Katipunan, a pamphlet printed in Tagalog language. Copies of which were distributed among the members of the society.

Kartilya was written by Emilio Jacinto, and later revised by Emilio Aguinaldo. The revised version consists of thirteen teachings (though some sources, such as the one provided by Philippine Centennial Commission, list only twelve). The term kartilya was derived from Spanish cartilla, which was a primer for grade school students before going to school at that time.

=== Language and alphabet ===
According to Filipino writer and historian Hermenegildo Cruz, the official language of the Katipunan is Tagalog, and uses an alphabet nearly similar to Spanish alphabet but has a different meaning and the way it was read was changed. Diacritics were added, to emphasize the existence of ng and mga on Tagalog orthography. The following is an excerpt from Cruz' Kartilyang Makabayan: Mga Tanong at Sagot Ukol Kay Andrés Bonifacio at sa KKK (English: Nationalist Primer: Questions and Answers about Andrés Bonifacio and KKK, Manila, 1922):

Original writing	Modern Manila Tagalog translation	Rough English translation
30. Anong wika ang ginagamit ng̃ mg̃á kasapi sa Katipunan?; Ang tagalog; n͠guni't ang kahulugan ng̃ ilang titik ng̃ abakadang kastilà ay iniba sa kanilang pagsulat ng̃ mg̃á kasulatan at gayon din sa paglagdá ng̃ kanilang mg̃á sagisag. Ang titik na "a" ay ginawang "z", ang "c" at "q" ay ginawang "k", ang "i" ay "n", ang "l" at "ll" ay "j" ang "m" ay "v", ang "n" ay "ll", ang "o" ay "c" at ang "u" ay "x". Ang f, j, v, x at z ng̃ abakadang kastilà ay itinakwil pagka't Hindi kailan͠gan. Sa maliwanag na ulat ay ganitó ang Abakadá (alfabeto) ng̃ "Katipunan" kung itutulad sa abakada ng̃ wikang kastilà.	30. Anong wika ang ginagamit ng mga miyembro sa Katipunan?; Ang Tagalog; pero ang kahulugan ng ilang letra ng abakadang Kastila ay iniba sa kanilang pagsulat ng mga kasulatan at ganoon din sa pagpirma ng kanilang mga sagisag (o simbolo). Ang letrang "a" ay ginawang "z", ang "c" at "q" ay ginawang "k", ang "i" ay "n", ang "l" at "ll" ay "j" ang "m" ay "v", ang "n" ay "ll", ang "o" ay "c" at ang "u" ay "x". Ang f, j, v, x at z ng abakadang Kastila ay itinakwil dahil sa Hindi kailangan. Sa maliwanag na salita ay ganito ang Abakada (alpabeto) ng "Katipunan" kung itutulad sa abakada ng wikang Kastila.	30. What is the language used by the members of the Katipunan?; Tagalog; however, the meanings of some letters from the Spanish alphabet have been changed. The letter "a" becomes "z", "c" and "q" become "k", the letter "i" is "n", the letters "l" and "ll" are "j" letter "m" is "v", letter "n" is "ll", letter "o" is "c" and letter "u" is "x". The letters f, j, v, x and z are not needed, and unused.

Presented below is the Katipunan alphabet, when compared to the Spanish alphabet.

Abakada ng̃ kastilà (Spanish alphabet)
A	B	C	D	E	F	G	H	I	J	K	LL	M	N	O	P	Q	R	S	T	U	V	W	X	Y	Z
Abakada ng̃ "Katipunan" ("Katipunan" alphabet)
Z	B	K	D	Q	H	G	F	N	L	K	J	V	LL	C	P	K	R	S	T	X	M	W	U	Y	-

== Preparation for the revolution ==
=== Attempt to seek Rizal's support ===
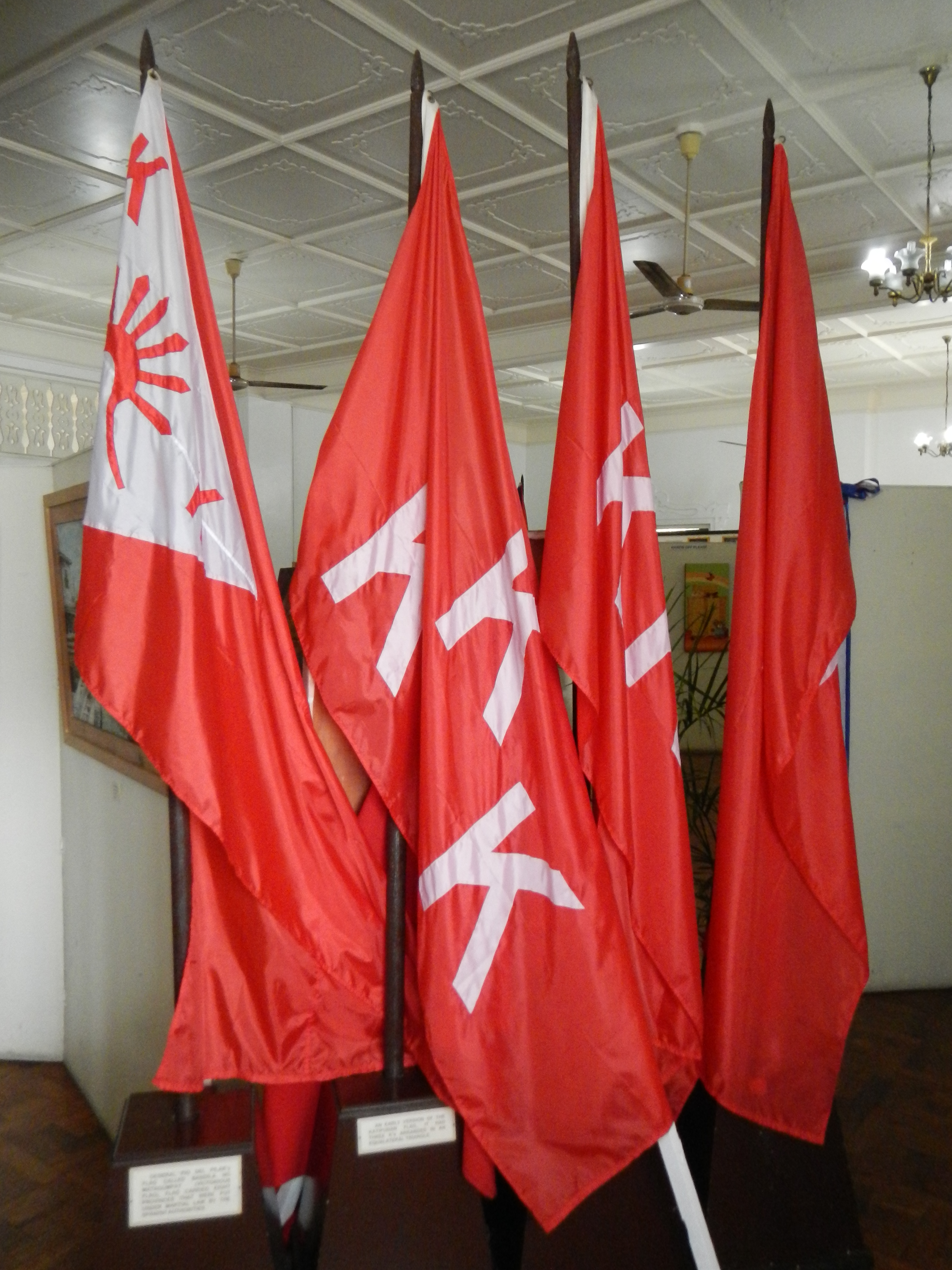
Flags of the Katipunan (Casa Real Shrine)

The night when Governor-General Eulogio Despujol exiled Dr. José Rizal to Dapitan, Katipunan was discovered.

In a secret meeting of the Katipunan by a small creek named Bitukang Manok (later known as Parian Creek, now nearly extinct) near Pasig on May 4, 1896, Bonifacio and his councilors decided to seek the advice of Rizal regarding a decision to revolt. Bonifacio delegated Dr. Pío Valenzuela as the Katipunan's emissary to Dapitan. This was done in order to inform Rizal of Katipunan's plan to launch a revolution and, if possible, a war against Spain. By the end of May 1896, Valenzuela had visited and interviewed Rizal in Dapitan. As cover, Valenzuela was accompanied by a blind man named Raymundo Máta, since Rizal is an ophthalmologist.

Valenzuela arrived in Dapitan on June 21, 1896, where Rizal welcomed him. After supper, Valenzuela told him his real purpose and the necessity of securing Rizal's support. According to Valenzuela, Rizal only answered, "Huwag, huwag! Iya'y makasasama sa bayang Pilipino!" (No, no! That will harm the Filipino nation!)

Rizal objected to Bonifacio's audacious plan to plunge the country into a bloody revolution. He believed it was premature for two reasons:

1. the people are not ready for a massive revolution; and
2. arms and funds must first be collected before raising the cry of revolution.

Because of this notion, Valenzuela made another proposal to Rizal: to rescue him. Rizal disapproved of this plan, because he had given his word of honor to the Spanish authorities, and he did not want to break it. Instead, Rizal advised Valenzuela to persuade wealthy Filipinos, so that they could solicit funds, where he recommended an elite army officer named Antonio Luna to be Katipunan's war general, should a revolution break out. According to Valenzuela's statement to the Spanish authorities, they almost quarreled over the matter and Valenzuela left the following day instead of staying for a month as originally planned.

When Valenzuela returned to Manila and informed the Katipunan of his failure to secure Rizal's sanction. Bonifacio, furious, warned Valenzuela not to tell anyone of Rizal's refusal to support the impending uprising. However, Valenzuela had already spread the word, so much fund proposals to the society were canceled. Despite Rizal's rejection, the Katipunan was already trying to address its arms supply problem and had taken steps to smuggle in weapons from abroad.

At his trial, Rizal denied that he knew Valenzuela, saying only that he met him first at Dapitan and that he considered him a good friend because of what Valenzuela showed to him and his appreciation of the medical tools Valenzuela gave to him. He also said that this was the last time they had met.

=== Attempt to solicit Japan's aid ===
Despite Rizal's rejection of an armed revolution, Bonifacio continued to plan for an armed conflict with Spain. The Katipunan cast its eyes on Japan, which loomed then as the probable champion of Asian liberties against Western oppression at the time. In May 1896, after Valenzuela's visit to Rizal, a delegation of Katipunan members, headed by Jacinto and Bonifacio, conferred with a visiting Japanese naval officer and captain of a Japanese ironclad warship, Kongō, and the Japanese consul at a Japanese bazaar in Manila. The interpreter, a friend of Valenzuela, was José Moritaro Tagawa who was married to a Filipino woman of Bocaue, Bulacan.

After the usual exchange of courtesies, Jacinto submitted the Katipunan memorial for the Emperor of Japan in which the Filipinos prayed for Japanese aid in their projected revolution, "so that the light of liberty that illuminates Japan may also shed its rays over the Philippines."

It was with good reason that the Katipunan solicited Japan's aid and alliance. Japan had been friendly to the Filipinos since the Spanish colonial era. Many Filipinos who had fled from Spanish persecution had been welcomed there and given full protection of Japanese laws. Bonifacio tried to purchase arms and ammunition from Japan, but failed due to lack of funds and the uncovering of the Katipunan, José Dizon was part of the committee that the Katipunan formed to secure arms from Japan with the connivance of the Japanese ship captain. Three months later, however, the Katipunan was uncovered and Dizon was among the hundreds who were arrested for rebellion.

== Discovery ==
The Katipunan was discovered by Spanish authorities in August 1896 due to a testimony from one of its members, Teodoro Patiño. A report from the Guardia Civil Veterana states that he was prompted to disclose its existence to the police after divulging the organization's secrets to his sister Honoria. Concerned for her well-being, he hoped that she would use the information to ensure her safety in case the Katipunan went to war. According to the report, Honoria, who was staying at an orphanage run by the Sisters of Charity, told the Mother Superior what she had learned from Teodoro. The mother superior then arranged a meeting between him and Mariano Gil, the parish priest of Tondo. There, Teodoro confessed all he knew about the Katipunan. These included the organization's lithographic materials that were being kept in the lockers of the Diario de Manila's printing house. Alarmed by the stunning truth of the existence of a secret society, Gil, accompanied by local Spanish authorities, searched the printing office of Diario de Manila and found incriminating evidence. After the arrest, he rushed to Governor-General Blanco to denounce the revolutionary plot of the Katipunan. The Spanish unleashed a crackdown and arrested dozens of people, where many innocent citizens were forced to go to Fort Santiago.

Patiño's alleged betrayal has become the standard version of how the revolution broke out in 1896. In the 1920s, however, the Philippine National Library commissioned a group of former Katipuneros to confirm the truth of the story. José Turiano Santiago, Bonifacio's close friend who was expelled in 1895, denied the story. He claimed that Bonifacio himself ordered Patiño to divulge the society's existence to hasten the Philippine revolution and preempt any objection from members.

In another version, the existence of the Katipunan became known to the authorities through Patiño, who revealed it to the general manager, La Font. Patiño was engaged in a bitter dispute over pay with de la Cruz and exposed the Katipunan to La Font, in retaliation. La Font led a Spanish police lieutenant to the shop and the desk of de la Cruz, where they "found Katipunan paraphernalia such as a rubber stamp, a little book, ledgers, membership oaths signed in blood, and a membership roster of the Maghiganti chapter of the Katipunan."

== Revolution ==
Flags of the Katipunan (on Emilio Aguinaldo Shrine)

When the Katipunan leaders learned of the arrests, Bonifacio called for an assembly of all provincial councils to decide the start of the armed uprising. The meeting was held at the house of Apolonio Samson at a place called Kangkong in Balintawak. About 1,000 Katipuneros attended the meeting but they were not able to settle the issue.

They met again at another place in Balintawak the following day. Historians are still debating whether this event took place in the yard of Melchora Aquino or at the house of her son Juan Ramos. The meeting took place either on August 23 or August 24. It was at this second meeting where the Katipuneros in attendance decided to start the armed uprising and they tore their cedulas (residence certificates and identity papers) as a sign of their commitment to the revolution. The Katipuneros also agreed to attack Manila on August 29.

But Spanish civil guards discovered the meeting and the first battle occurred with the Battle of Pasong Tamo. While the Katipunan initially had the upper hand, the Spanish civil guards turned the fight around. Bonifacio and his men retreated toward Marikina via Balara (now in Quezon City). They then proceeded to San Mateo (in the province now called Rizal) and took the town. The Spanish, however, regained it three days later. After regrouping, the Katipuneros decided not to attack Manila directly but agreed to take the Spanish powder magazine and garrison at San Juan.

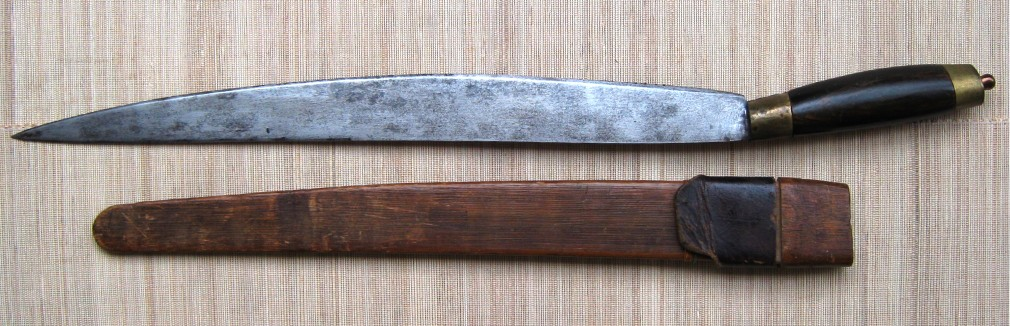
Typical Katipunero bolo

On August 30, the Katipunan attacked the 14 Spanish soldiers (twelve Philippine soldiers and two Spanish officers) defending the powder magazine in the Battle of San Juan del Monte or Battle of Pinaglabanan, who were before noon reinforced by the 73rd "Jolo" Regiment, composed of Filipino soldiers under Spanish officers, under the command of General Bernardo Echaluce y Jauregui. About 153 Katipuneros were killed in the battle, but the Katipunan had to withdraw upon the arrival of Spanish reinforcements. More than 200 were taken as prisoners. At about the same time, Katipuneros in other suburban Manila areas, like Caloocan, San Pedro de Macáti (now Makati), Pateros and Taguig, rose up in arms. In the afternoon of the same day, the Spanish Gov. Gen. Camilo de Polavieja declared martial law in Manila and the provinces of Cavite, Laguna, Batangas, Bulacan, Pampanga, Tarlac and Nueva Ecija. The Philippine Revolution had begun.

In Bulacan, the Bulacan Revolutionary Movement was attacked by the strongest artillery forces ever converged in the capital town of Bulacan. This subsequently led to the Battle of San Rafael, where Gen. Anacleto Enriquez and his men were surrounded and attacked in the Church of San Rafael.

=== Battle of Kakarong de Sili ===
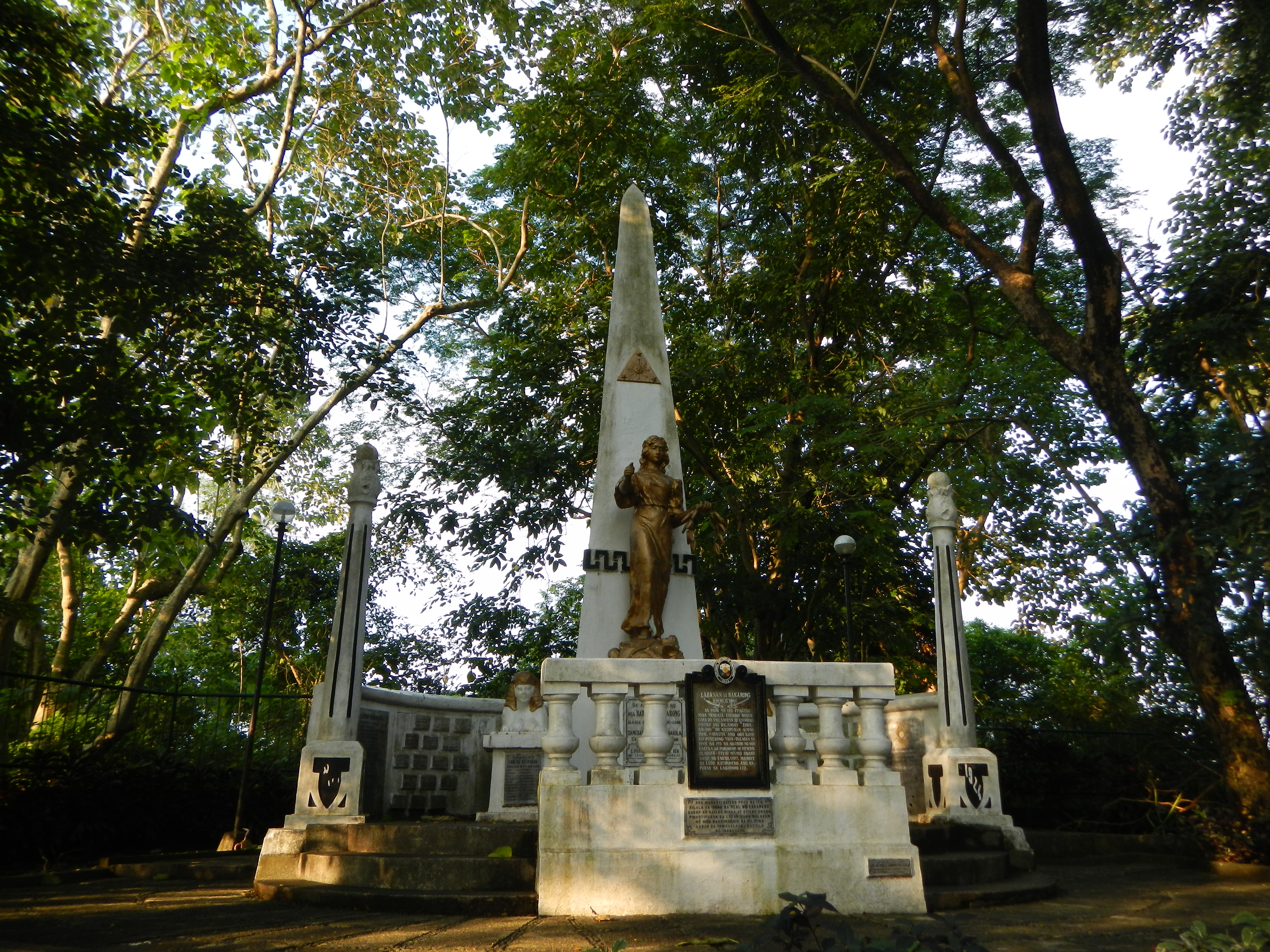
Inang Filipina Shrine

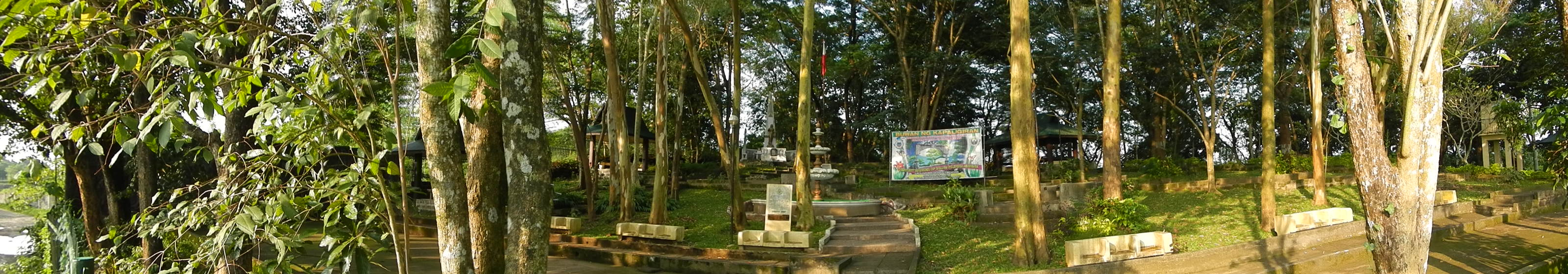
Panorama of the park and the shrine

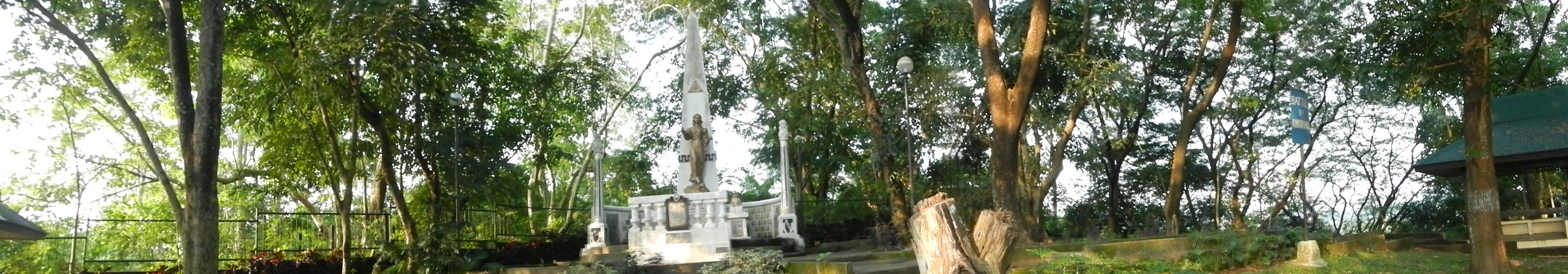
Facade

Pandi, Bulacan played a vital and historical role in the fight for Philippine independence. Pandi is known for the Réal de Kakarong de Sili Shrine—Inang Filipina Shrine, the site of the bloodiest battle in Bulacan, where more than 3,000 Katipunero revolutionaries died. Likewise, it is on this site where the Republic of Réal de Kakarong de Sili of 1896, one of the first Philippine revolutionary republics, was established.

It was in Kakarong de Sili—which about 6,000 Katipuneros from various towns of Bulacan headed by Brigadier General Eusebio Roque, better known as "Maestrong Sebio" or "Dimabungo" (see list of Filipino generals in the Philippine Revolution and the Philippine–American War)—that the "Kakarong Republic" was organized shortly after the Cry of Pugad Lawin, referred to as the "Cry of Balintawak".

=== Kakarong Republic ===
History and researchers, as well as records of the National Historical Commission, tells that the "Kakarong Republic" was the first and truly organized revolutionary government established in the country to overthrow the Spaniards antedating event the famous Malolos Republic and the Biak-na-Bato Republic. In recognition thereof, these three "republics" established in Bulacan have been incorporated in the seal of the province of Bulacan.

According to available records including the biography of General Gregorio del Pilar entitled Life and Death of a Boy General written by Teodoro Kalaw, former director of the National Library of the Philippines, a fort was constructed at "Kakarong de Sili" that was like a miniature city. It had streets, an independent police force, a musical band, a factory of falconets, bolos and repair shops for rifles and cartridges. The 'Kakarong Republic' had a complete set of officials with Canuto Villanueva as Supreme Chief and 'Maestrong Sebio'—Eusebio Roque as Brigadier General of the Army. The fort was attacked and totally destroyed on January 1, 1897, by a large Spanish force headed by the Commandant Olaguer-Feliu. Del Pilar was only a lieutenant at the time and the Battle of Kakarong de Sili was his "baptism of fire." This was where he was first wounded and escaped to a nearby barangay 'Manatal.'

The Kakarong Lodge No. 168 of the 'Legionarios del Trabajo', named in memory of the 1,200 Katipuneros who perished in the battle, erected a monument named the Inang Filipina Shrine – (Mother Philippines Shrine) in 1924 in the barrio of Kakarong of Pandi, Bulacan.

The actual site of the Battle of Kakarong de Sili is now a part of the barangay of Réal de Kakarong. No less than one of the greatest generals in the Philippines' history, General Emilio Aguinaldo who became the first Philippine president visited this sacred ground in the late 1950s.

== Spanish response ==
Even before the discovery of the Katipunan, Rizal applied for a position as a doctor in the Spanish army in Cuba in a bid to persuade the Spanish authorities of his loyalty to Spain. His application was accepted and he arrived in Manila to board a ship for Spain in August 1896, shortly before the secret society was exposed. However, while Rizal was en route to Spain, the Katipunan was unmasked and a telegram overtook the steamer at Port Said, recalling him to the Philippines to face charges that he was the mastermind of the uprising. He was later executed by musketry on December 30, 1896, at the field of Bagumbayan (now known as Luneta).

While Rizal was being tried by a military court for treason, the prisoners taken in the Battle of Pinaglabanan—Sancho Valenzuela, Ramón Peralta, Modesto Sarmiento, and Eugenio Silvestre—were executed on September 6, 1896, at Bagumbayan.

Six days later, they also executed the Thirteen Martyrs of Cavite at Fort San Felipe Fort in Cavite.

The Spanish colonial authorities also pressed for the prosecution of those who were arrested after the raid on the Diario de Manila printing press, where they found evidence incriminating not only common folk but also wealthy Filipino society leaders.

The Bicol Martyrs were executed by firing squad on January 4, 1897, at Bagumbayan. They were Manuel Abella, Domingo Abella, priests Inocencio Herrera, Gabriel Prieto and Severino Díaz, Camio Jacob, Tomas Prieto, Florencio Lerma, Macario Valentin, Cornelio Mercado and Mariano Melgarejo.

They arrested and seized the properties of prominent businessmen Francisco Roxas, Telesforo Chuidián and Jacinto Limjáp. While there may be circumstantial evidence pointing to Chuidián and Limjáp as financiers of the revolution, the record showed no evidence against Roxas except that he was involved in funding the Propaganda Movement. Even Mariano Ponce, another leader of the Propaganda Movement, said the arrest of Roxas was a "fatal mistake". Nonetheless, Roxas was found guilty of treason and shot on January 11, 1897, at Bagumbayan.

Roxas was executed with Numeriano Adriáno, José Dizon, Domíngo Franco, Moisés Salvadór, Luis Enciso Villaréal, Braulio Rivera, Antonio Salazar, Ramón P. Padilla, Faustino Villaruél and Faustino Mañalac. Also executed with the group were Lt. Benedicto Nijaga and Corporal Gerónimo Cristóbal, both of the Spanish army.

On February 6, 1897, Apolonio de la Cruz, Román Bása, Teodoro Pláta, Vicente Molina, Hermenegildo de los Reyes, José Trinidad, Pedro Nicodemus, Feliciano del Rosario, Gervasio Samson and Doroteo Domínguez were also executed at Bagumbayan.

But the executions, particularly Rizal's, only added fuel to the rebellion, with the Katipuneros shouting battle cries: "Mabuhay ang Katagalugan!" ("Long Live the Tagalog Nation!" – Katagalugan (Tagalog Nation) being the Katipunan term for the Philippines) and "Mabuhay si Dr. José Rizal!" ("Long Live Dr. José Rizal!"). To the Katipuneros, Rizal was the honorary president of the Katipunan.

== Schism, transfer of authority and dissolution ==
A rivalry emerged from the two leading factions of the Katipunan in Cavite: the Magdiwang (right), led by Mariano Alvarez and the Magdalo (left), led by Baldomero Aguinaldo.

In the course of the revolution against Spain, a split developed between the Magdiwang faction (led by Gen. Mariano Álvarez) and the Magdalo faction (led by Gen. Baldomero Aguinaldo, cousin of General Emilio Aguinaldo), both situated in Cavite.

At a convention in Tejeros, Cavite, the revolutionaries assembled to form a revolutionary government. There, on March 22, 1897, it was decided to dissolve the Katipunan and establish a republic. Bonifacio lost his bid for the presidency of the revolutionary government to Emilio Aguinaldo, who was in Pasong Santol, fighting the Spanish forces and instead was elected Secretary of the Interior. When members of the Magdalo faction tried to discredit him as uneducated and unfit for the position, Bonifacio declared the results of the convention as null and void, speaking as the Supremo of the Katipunan. Despite this, Aguinaldo took his oath of office as president the next day in Santa Cruz de Malabon (present-day Tanza) in Cavite, as did the rest of the officers, except for Bonifacio. Bonifacio and a few others issued the Acta de Tejeros, proclaiming the events at the Tejeros Convention to have been "disorderly and tarnished by chicanery.", followed by the Naic Military Agreement characterizing actions at Tejeros to have been treasonous. This led to Andrés Bonifacio and his brother Procopio being arrested due to alleged incidents in Indang and, upon the orders of the Council of War and approved by Gen. Aguinaldo, they were both executed on May 10, 1897, at Mount Buntis in Maragondon, Cavite. He and his brother were buried in an unmarked grave.

The Katipunan revolution led to the eventual establishment of the First Philippine Republic. The Philippine Republic, more commonly known as the First Philippine Republic or the Malolos Republic was a short-lived nascent revolutionary government in the Philippines. It was formally established with the proclamation of the Malolos Constitution on January 23, 1899, in Malolos, Bulacan, and endured until the capture of Emilio Aguinaldo by the American forces on March 23, 1901, in Palanan, Isabela, which effectively dissolved the First Republic. The United States eventually destroyed the First Philippine Republic in the Philippine–American War. Afterwards, the Americans exterminated any remaining vestige of the Katipunan.

== See also ==
- Armed Forces of the Philippines
- Battle of Binakayan-Dalahican
- Battle of Imus
- Battle of Perez Dasmariñas
- Battle of Zapote Bridge
- First Philippine Republic
- History of the Philippine Army
- Luna Sharpshooters
- Malolos Congress
- Military history of the Philippines
- Philippine–American War
- Philippine Army
- Philippine Declaration of Independence
- Philippine Revolutionary Army
- Secret society
- Spanish–American War
