= José Dizon =

José Dizon y Matanza (died January 11, 1897) was a Filipino patriot who was among those who founded the Katipunan that sparked the Philippine Revolution.

Dizon was born in Binondo, Manila and was married to Roberta Bartolomé, who died in March 1876, eight months after giving birth to their daughter Marina. Dizon entrusted Marina to his sister Josefa Dizon Jacinto and her son Emilio Jacinto while he worked as an engraver in the mint in Manila.

In April 1892, he was inducted into the freemasonic lodge founded by Pedro Serrano Laktaw. That same year, he founded the lodge Taliba in Trozo(present part of masangkay corner mayhaligue street of Tondo, District 2), Manila and served as its venerable master. He was also among the officers of the grand regional council that included Apolinario Mabini.

Like many Filipino freemasons of that time, Dizon was among the original members of La Liga Filipina which José Rizal founded to push for reforms in the Spanish colonial administration of the Philippines. But Rizal was arrested on July 7 and deported to Dapitan in Mindanao.

On the same day, Dizon and several fellow freemasons, including Andres Bonifacio, decided to establish the Katipunan with the radical aim of achieving independence through revolution.

In May 1896, Dizon was part of the committee that the Katipunan formed to secure arms from Japan with the connivance of a Japanese ship captain. Three months later, however, the Katipunan was uncovered and Dizon was among the hundreds who were arrested for rebellion. Convicted by a military court, he was executed by musketry on January 11, 1897, along with Numeriano Adriano, Domingo Franco, Moises Salvador, Luis Enciso Villareal, Braulio Rivera, Antonio Salazar, Ramon Padilla, Francisco Roxas, Faustino Villaruel and Faustino Manalak. Also executed with the group were Lt. Benedicto Nijaga and Corporal Geronimo Medina, both of the Spanish army.
