= La Liga Filipina =

Filipino secret organization

- Monogram of La Liga Filipina
- Successor: Cuerpo de Compromisarios; Katipunan
- Formation: July 3, 1892
- Founder: José Rizal
- Founded at: Tondo, Manila, Captaincy General of the Philippines
- Affiliations: Propaganda Movement

La Liga Filipina (lit. 'The Philippine League') was a secret society. It was founded by José Rizal in the house of Doroteo Ongjunco at Ilaya Street, Tondo, Manila on July 3, 1892. In 1892, prior to its birth, Rizal alighted at the Old Malolos station to campaign in the Malolos Historic Town Center for the Philippine League's establishment.

The organization derived from La Solidaridad and the Propaganda movement. The purpose of La Liga Filipina was to build a new group that sought to involve the people directly in the reform movement.

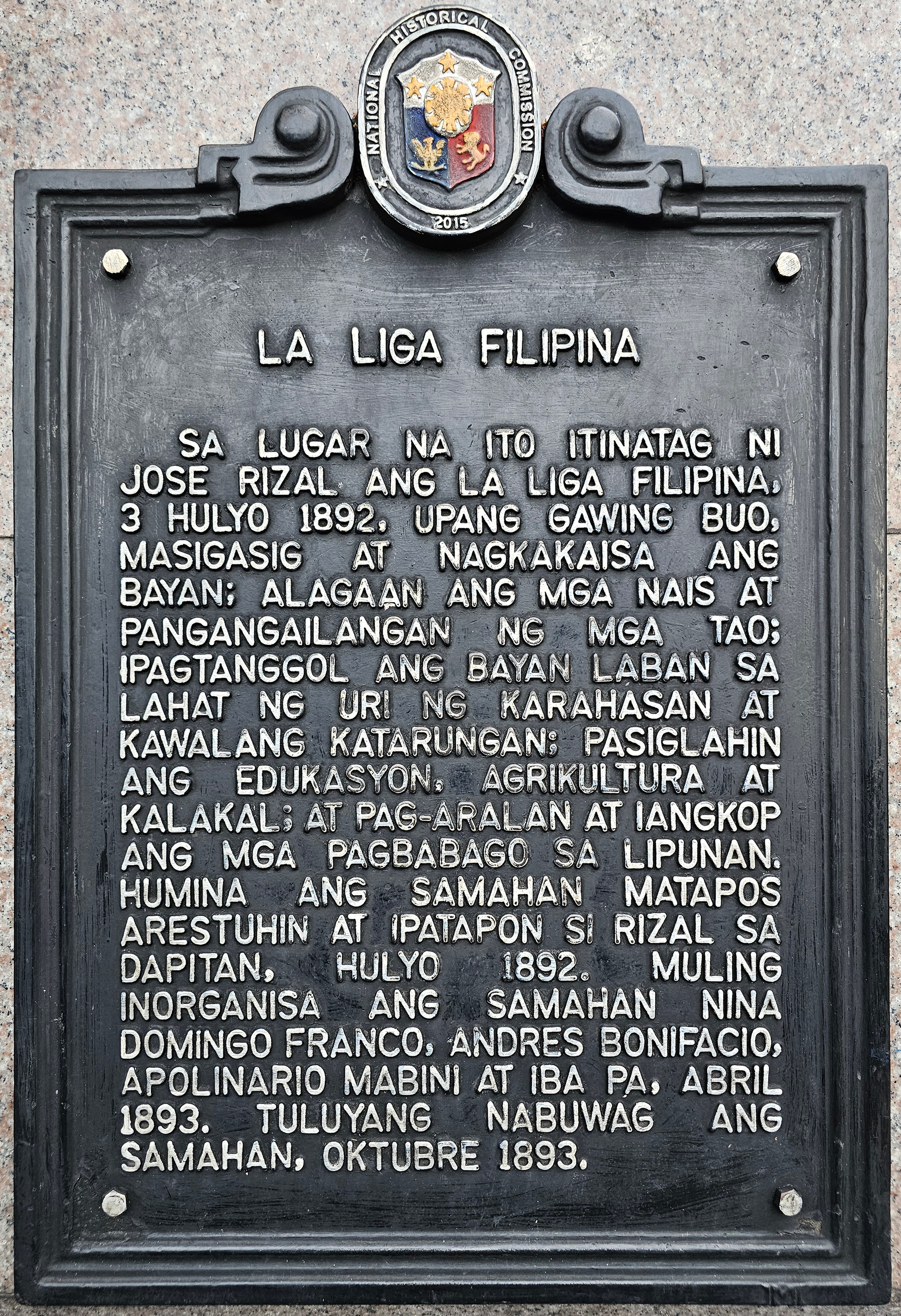
National historical marker installed in 2015 in Tondo, Manila

The league was to be a sort of mutual aid and self-help society dispensing scholarship funds and legal aid, loaning capital and setting up cooperatives, the league became a threat to Spanish authorities that they arrested Rizal on July 6, 1892, then he was sent to Dapitan.

During the exile of Rizal, the organization became inactive, though through the efforts of Domingo Franco and Andrés Bonifacio, it was reorganized. The organization decided to declare its support for La Solidaridad and the reforms it advocated, raise funds for the paper, and defray the expenses of deputies advocating reforms for the country before the Spanish Cortes. Eventually after some disarray in the leadership of the group, the Supreme Council of the League dissolved the society.

Liga membership split into two groups when it was about to be revealed: the conservatives formed the Cuerpo de Compromisarios which pledged to continue supporting the La Solidaridad while the radicals led by Bonifacio devoted themselves to a new and secret society, the Katipunan.

== Aims ==
- To unite the whole archipelago into one vigorous and homogeneous organization
- Mutual protection in every want and necessity
- Defense against all violence and injustice
- Encouragement of instruction, agriculture, and commerce
- Study the application of reforms
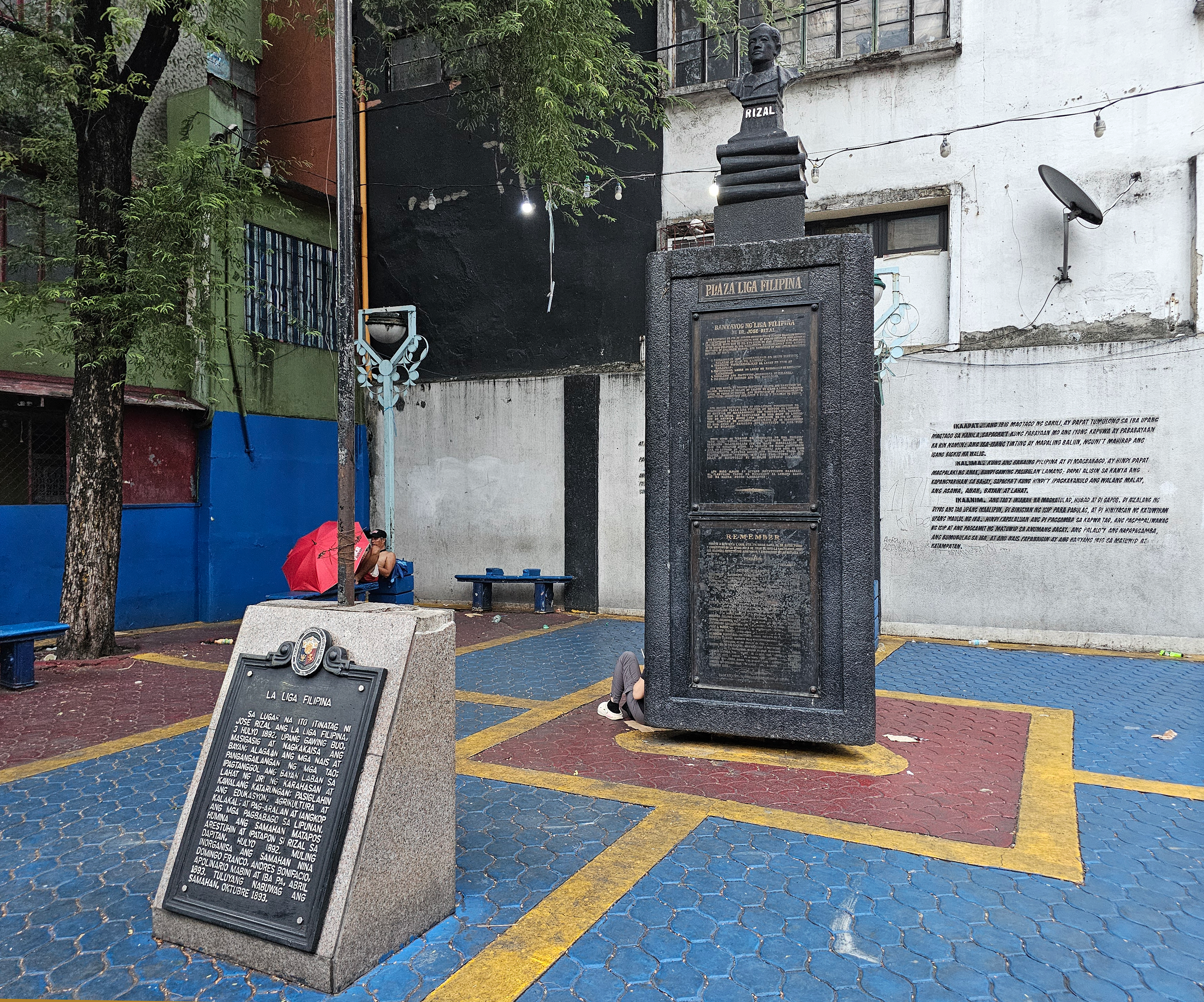
Plaza Liga Filipina at the approximate site where the league was founded in 1892

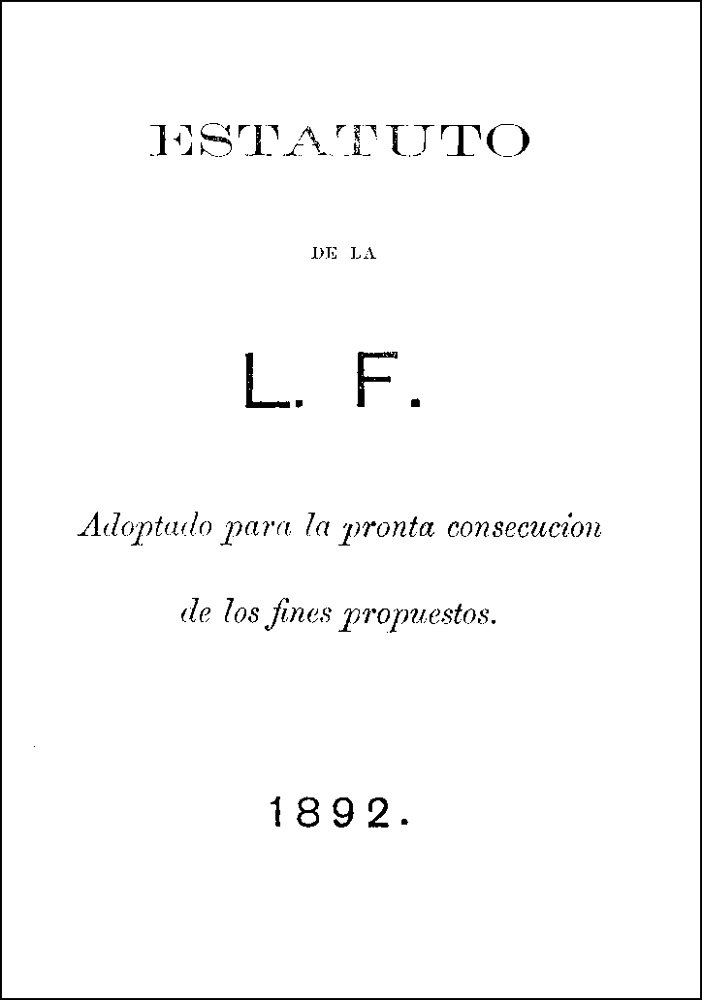
The cover page of the constitution of La Liga Filipina

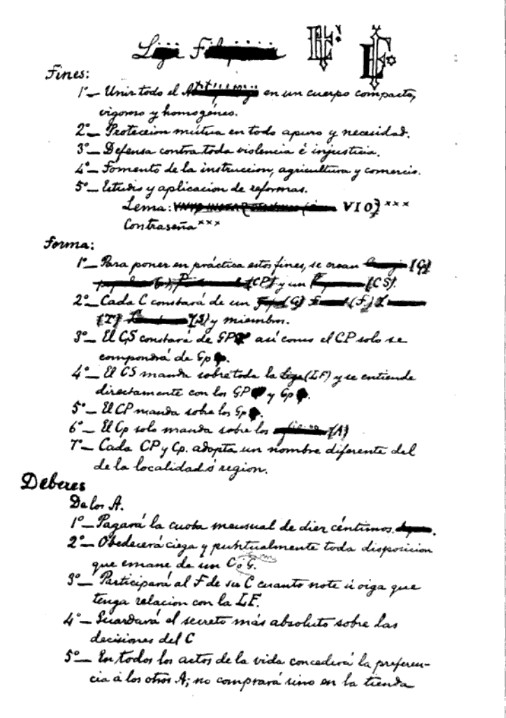
Regulations of the La Liga Filipina handwritten by José Rizal, c. 1890s

== Members of La Liga Filipina ==
=== Directors ===
- Jose P. Rizal, founder
- Ambrosio Salvador, president of the league
- Agustín de la Rosa, fiscal
- Bonifacio Arévalo, treasurer
- Deodato Arellano, secretary and first supreme leader of Katipunan

==== Exile of Rizal ====
- Domingo Franco, president and supreme leader
- Deodato Arellano, Secretary-Treasurer
- Isidro Francisco, fiscal
- Apolinario Mabini, secretary
- Marcelo H. del Pilar, editor-in-chief
- Graciano López-Jaena, former editor-in-chief

=== Other members ===
- Andres C. Bonifacio, supreme leader of Katipunan and led the Cry of Pugad Lawin
- Mamerto Natividad, one of the leaders of the revolution in Nueva Ecija
- Moises Salvador, master of lodge of the mason in Balagtas
- Numeriano Adriano, chief guard of lodge of the mason in Balagtas
- José A. Dizon, master of lodge of the mason in Taliba
- Ambrosio Rianzares Bautista, war adviser during First Philippine Republic, author of Philippine Declaration of Independence.
- Timoteo Lanuza, stated the depose to dispel the Spanish frail in the Philippine in 1889.
- Marcelino de Santos, bidder and assistant of La Solidaridad.
- Paulino Zamora, master of lodge of the mason in Lusong
- Procopio Bonifacio
- Juan Zulueta, member of lodge of the mason in Lusong, Member of Supreme Council.
- Doroteo Ongjunco, member of lodge of the mason in Lusong
- Arcadio del Rosario, publicist of lodge of the mason in Balagtas
- Timoteo Páez, a member of Supreme Council
- Mariano Limjap, financier of La Liga Filipina
- Franciso Nakpil, brother of Julio Nakpil

== See also ==
- Secret society
