= Propaganda Movement =

Filipino political movement

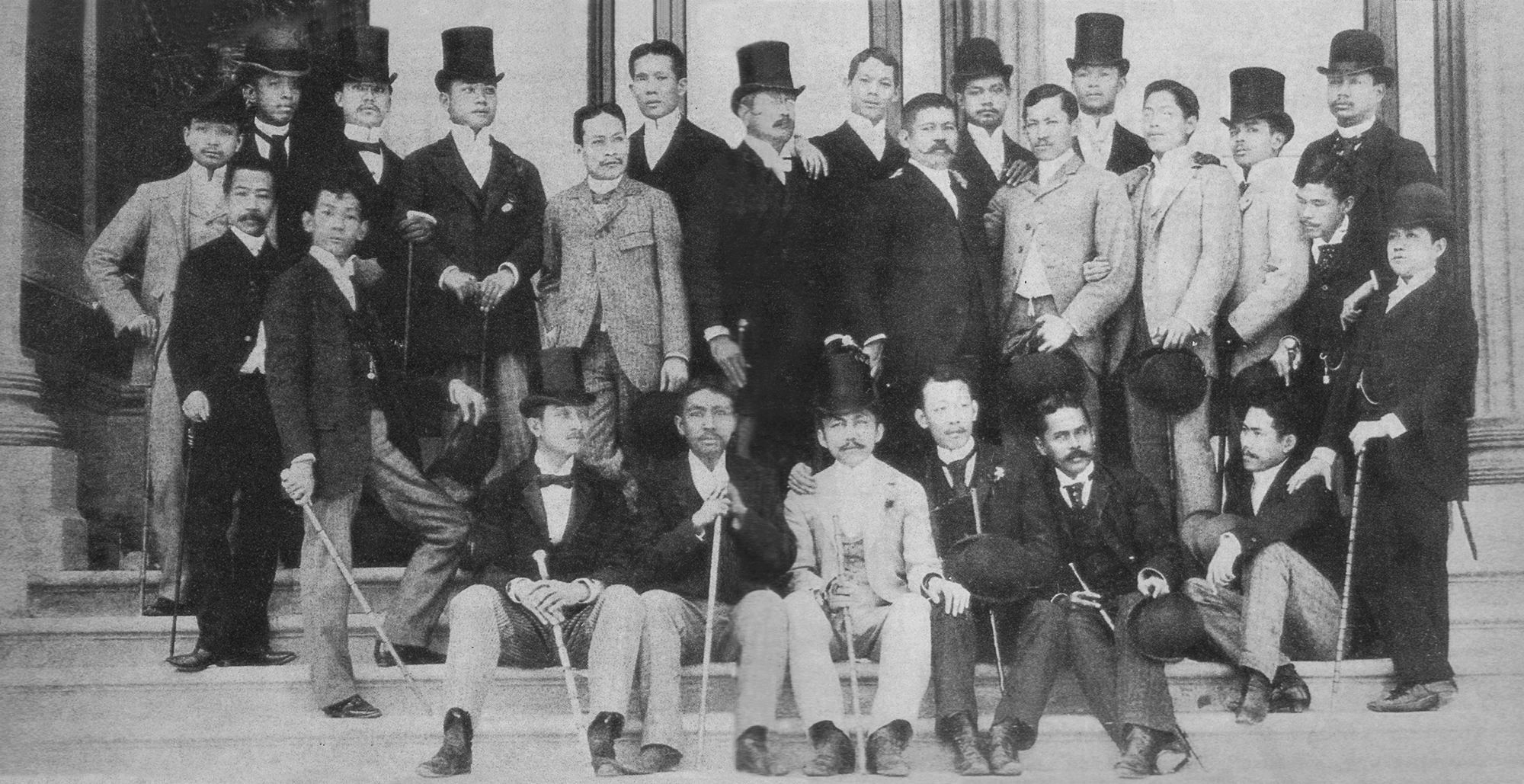
Filipino expatriates in Europe formed the Propaganda Movement. Photographed in Madrid, Spain in 1890.

The Philippine Propaganda Movement encompassed the activities of a group based in Spain but coming from the Philippines, composed of Indios (indigenous peoples), Mestizos (mixed race), Insulares (Spaniards born in the Philippines, also known as "Filipinos" as that term had a different, less expansive meaning prior to the death of Jose Rizal in Bagumbayan) and Peninsulares (Spaniards born in Spain) who called for political reforms in the Philippines in the late 19th century, and produced books, leaflets, and newspaper articles to educate others about their goals and issues they were trying to solve. They were active approximately from 1880 to 1898, and especially between 1880 and 1895, before the Philippine Revolutionary War against Spain began.

Prominent members included José Rizal, the Philippine National Hero, author of novels Noli Me Tángere and El filibusterismo, and various essays, who was later executed by firing squad by the Spanish colonial authorities; Graciano López Jaena, publisher of La Solidaridad, the movement's principal organ; Mariano Ponce, the organization's secretary, and Marcelo H. del Pilar.

The movement received very strong intellectual influence from the European Enlightenment, as evidenced by their specific aims, as follows:

- Reinstate the former representation of the Philippines in the Cortes Generales or Spanish Parliament granted in the 1812 Spanish Constitution but retracted by Conservative forces in 1837
- Secularize the clergy (i.e. use a secular or diocesan priest rather than clergy from a religious order)
- Legalize equality between Peninsulares (Spaniards born in Spain) and the other classes in the Philippine archipelago like the Indios, Mestizos and Insulares (old definition of the term "Filipino")
- Reestablish Spanish citizenship for Indios and Mestizos that was retracted by Conservative forces in 1837
- Reestablish the Philippines as a formal province of Spain, and not as a colony nor as an "overseas province"
- Abolish polo y servicios (labor service) and the bandala (forced sale of local products to the government)
- Guarantee basic civil freedoms for all living in the archipelago
- Provide opportunity for Indios, Mestizos and Insulares/Filipinos equal to Peninsulares to enter government service

Dr. Domingo Abella, Director of the National Archives between 1967 and 1976, had suggested that the Propaganda Movement was misnamed. He believes that it should have been called the Counterpropaganda Movement because its essential task was to counteract the campaign of misinformation that certain Spanish groups were disseminating in Spain and later in Rome (the Vatican). It was a campaign of information, as well as a bid to build sympathy for political reform.

It is notable in contrast to the Katipunan, or the "K.K.K.", a Filipino revolutionary movement seeking the total independence of the Philippines from Spain. The Propaganda Movement instead sought to have the Philippines assimilated as a formal province of Spain, rather than being governed as a colony or an ¨overseas province.¨ The Katipunan revolutionary movement arose in response to the failure of the Spanish-based Propagandist Movement to achieve its goals.

The Filipinos of this movement were using "propaganda" in its Latin sense, not the pejorative connotation it has acquired in English. For instance, the Catholic institution called Sacra Congregatio de Propaganda Fide - Sacred Congregation for the Propagation of the Faith, is now translated as 'For the Evangelization of Peoples'). It was in the latter sense that the word was used by the Filipino group that sent Marcelo H. del Pilar to Spain to continue the "propaganda" on behalf of the Philippines.
