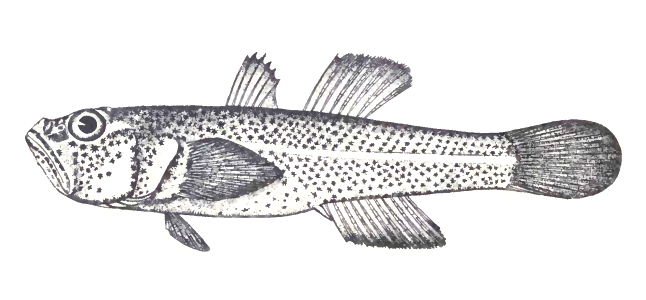
- Gobiopterus stellatus

Scientific classification
- Kingdom: Animalia
- Phylum: Chordata
- Class: Actinopterygii
- Order: Gobiiformes
- Family: Oxudercidae
- Subfamily: Gobionellinae
- Genus: Gobiopterus; Bleeker, 1874

Type species
- Apocryptes brachypterus Bleeker, 1855

Synonyms
- Gobiella H. M. Smith, 1931; Leptogobius Bleeker, 1874; Micrapocryptes Hora, 1923; Mirogobius Herre, 1927; Munrogobius Whitley, 1951; Paraphya Munro, 1949

= Gobiopterus =

Genus of fishes

Gobiopterus is a genus of gobies native to fresh, marine and brackish waters of the coastal areas around the Indian and Pacific oceans.

== Species ==
There are currently 9 recognized species in this genus:

- Gobiopterus birtwistlei (Herre, 1935)
- Gobiopterus brachypterus (Bleeker, 1855)
- Gobiopterus chuno (F. Hamilton, 1822)
- Gobiopterus lacustris (Herre, 1927) (Lacustrine goby)
- Gobiopterus macrolepis (T. Y. Cheng, 1965)
- Gobiopterus mindanensis (Herre, 1944)
- Gobiopterus panayensis (Herre, 1944)
- Gobiopterus semivestitus (Munro, 1949)
- Gobiopterus stellatus (Herre, 1927) (Dwarf freshwater goby)

Incertae sedis

- Gobiopterus smithi (Menon & Talwar, 1973)
