= Gobiopterus chuno =

Conservation status
- Least Concern (IUCN 3.1)

Scientific classification
- Kingdom: Animalia
- Phylum: Chordata
- Class: Actinopterygii
- Division: Teleostei
- Order: Gobiiformes
- Family: Oxudercidae
- Genus: Gobiopterus
- Species: G. chuno

Binomial name
- Gobiopterus chuno (Hamilton, 1822)

Synonyms
- Gobius chuno Hamilton, 1822

Species of fish

Gobiopterus chuno, commonly known as the glass goby, is a species of goby found in rivers and estuaries from India to Sumatra and Borneo. It is found in the lower, slow flowing stretches of rivers, backwaters and swamps in both fresh and brackish water where it feeds on zooplankton. This widespread and common species may be a species complex and different populations may prove to be separate species.
