= Marcelo H. del Pilar Shrine =

Historic mansion in Bulacan, Philippines

- Dambanang Marcelo H. del Pilar (Filipino)
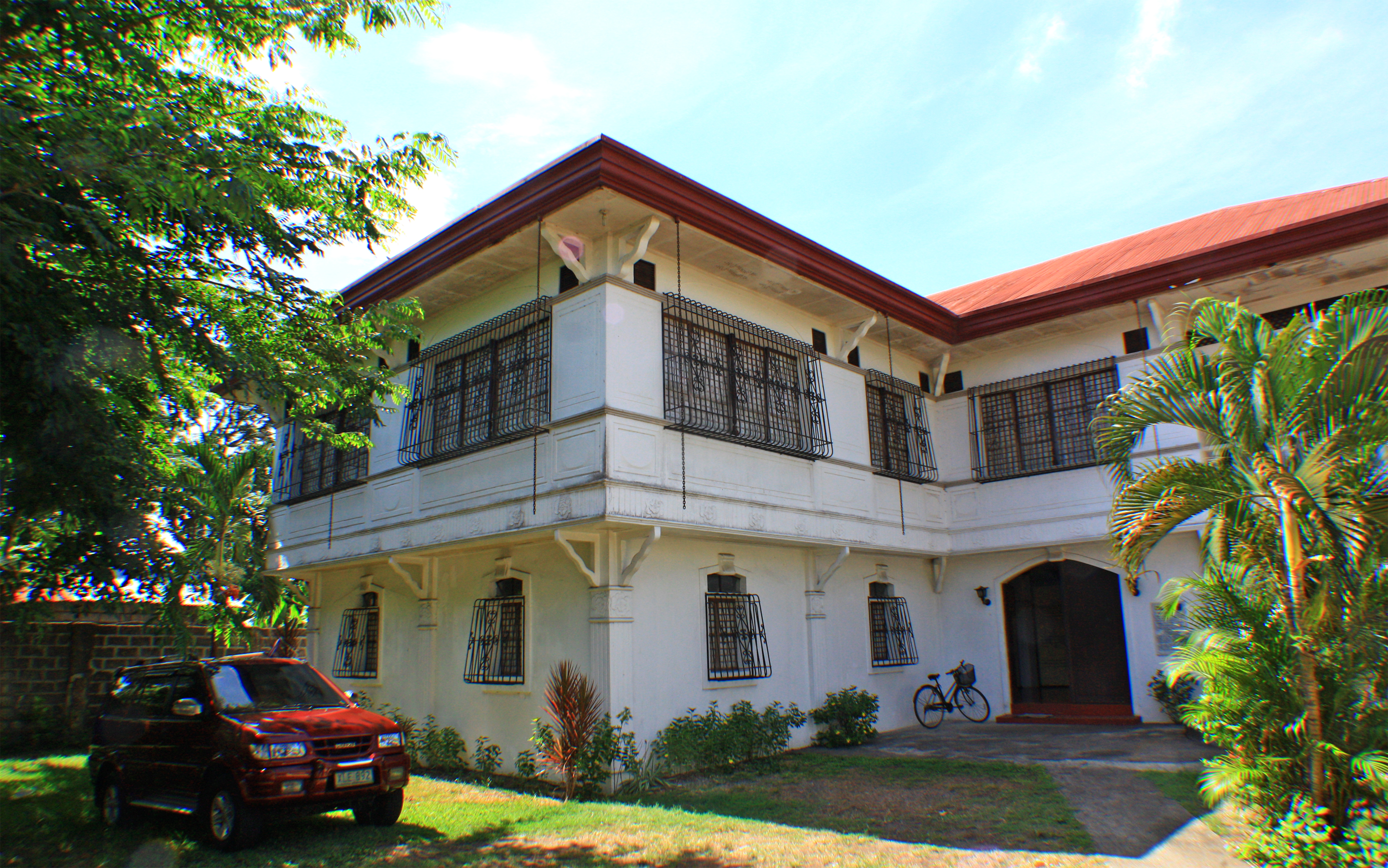
- Interactive map of the Marcelo H. del Pilar Shrine area
- Alternative names: Plaridel Shrine

General information
- Status: National Shrine (Level 1)
- Type: Mansion
- Architectural style: Bahay na Bato
- Location: Sitio Cupang, Brgy. San Nicolas, Bulakan, Bulacan, Philippines
- Coordinates: 14°47′50″N 120°52′08″E
- Inaugurated: 1956
- Owner: Government of the Philippines

The Marcelo H. del Pilar Shrine is a declared national shrine by the National Historical Commission of the Philippines in honor of Filipino lawyer, poet and propagandist Marcelo H. del Pilar. Located at Sitio Cupang, Barangay San Nicolas in Bulakan, Bulacan, the shrine is the former site of the house of the del Pilar clan. Currently, the shrine is under the management of the National Historical Commission of the Philippines.

== History ==
Marcelo H. del Pilar was born on this site on August 30, 1850, to Julian Hilario del Pilar and Blasa Gatmaytan. By the time of the Philippine revolution, del Pilar was forced to leave his home in Bulakan and escape to Spain wherein he continued his work along with other progressives like Jose Rizal, and Graciano Lopez Jaena. Marcelo del Pilar, otherwise known as Plaridel, died of tuberculosis in Spain on July 4, 1896. A few years after his death, his remains were exhumed and brought back to the Philippines on December 3, 1920, to be laid to rest at the Mausoleo de los Veteranos de la Revolucion in the Manila North Cemetery.

Heading into the 21st century, a historical marker was placed on the site in 1939 by the Philippine Historical Committee, the precursor of the National Historical Commission of the Philippines. A shrine to commemorate Plaridel was first conceived in 1955 by the Samahang Bulacan under the leadership of poet Jose Corazon de Jesus. Later the next year, on August 30, 1956, during the celebration of his birth day, a ground-breaking for the said shrine was held. The event was headed by former President Ramon Magsaysay and was blessed by Rev. Fr. Vicente Marasigan, S.J. grandson of del Pilar. In 1957, Speaker Jose Laurel donated a sum of Php. 49, 000 for the construction of the shrine. The development of the site as a shrine (including a bronze statue purportedly to be done by National Artists Guillermo Tolentino) was not completed, however. On August 30, 1982, a ten-foot tall statue of del Pilar was erected at the center of the birth site. The monument was done by renowned Maloleno sculptor Apolinario P. Bulaong using cement mixed with crushed bronze. Afterwards, the 4,027 square meter birth site was donated to the Bulacan Provincial Government by the family of Plaridel's youngest daughter, Anita del Pilar-Marasigan through Atty. Benita Marasigan-Santos. On August 30, 1983, the site was turned over to the National Historical Institute (now the National Historical Commission of the Philippines) and was from that point on, known as the Marcelo H. del Pilar Historical Landmark. After roughly six decades of being interred at the Manila North Cemetery, the remains of Marcelo del Pilar was transferred to his birthsite on August 30, 1984. His remains were laid to rest under his monument. Atty. Marasigan-Santos later on had a mausoleum built behind the monument and re-interred the remains of their family members, among them Plaridel's wife, Marciana “Tsanay” del Pilar. Sculptor Bulaong was once again commissioned to create a mural depicting the hero's life.

Upon the celebration of the del Pilar's centennial death anniversary, on July 4, 1996, former President Fidel V. Ramos ordered allocation of funds for the erection of a museum-library at the back of the site. The construction was undertaken by the municipal government of Bulakan, Bulacan and was inaugurated on August 30, 1998. The administration of the museum-library was handed over to the NHI on February 15, 2000. Contrary to local rumors, the museum-library was not patterned after the original bahay-na-bato house of Marcelo del Pilar.

=== Declaration as a National Shrine ===
With the NHI board resolution no. 1, s. 2006, the Marcelo H. del Pilar Historical Landmark was formally established as the Marcelo H. del Pilar Shrine. Later on, the site was recognized by the NHCP as a historic site and the marker that was installed in 1939 was replaced with a revised text. The new historical marker was installed on January 17, 2012.

== Features ==
=== Marcelo del Pilar Monument and tomb ===
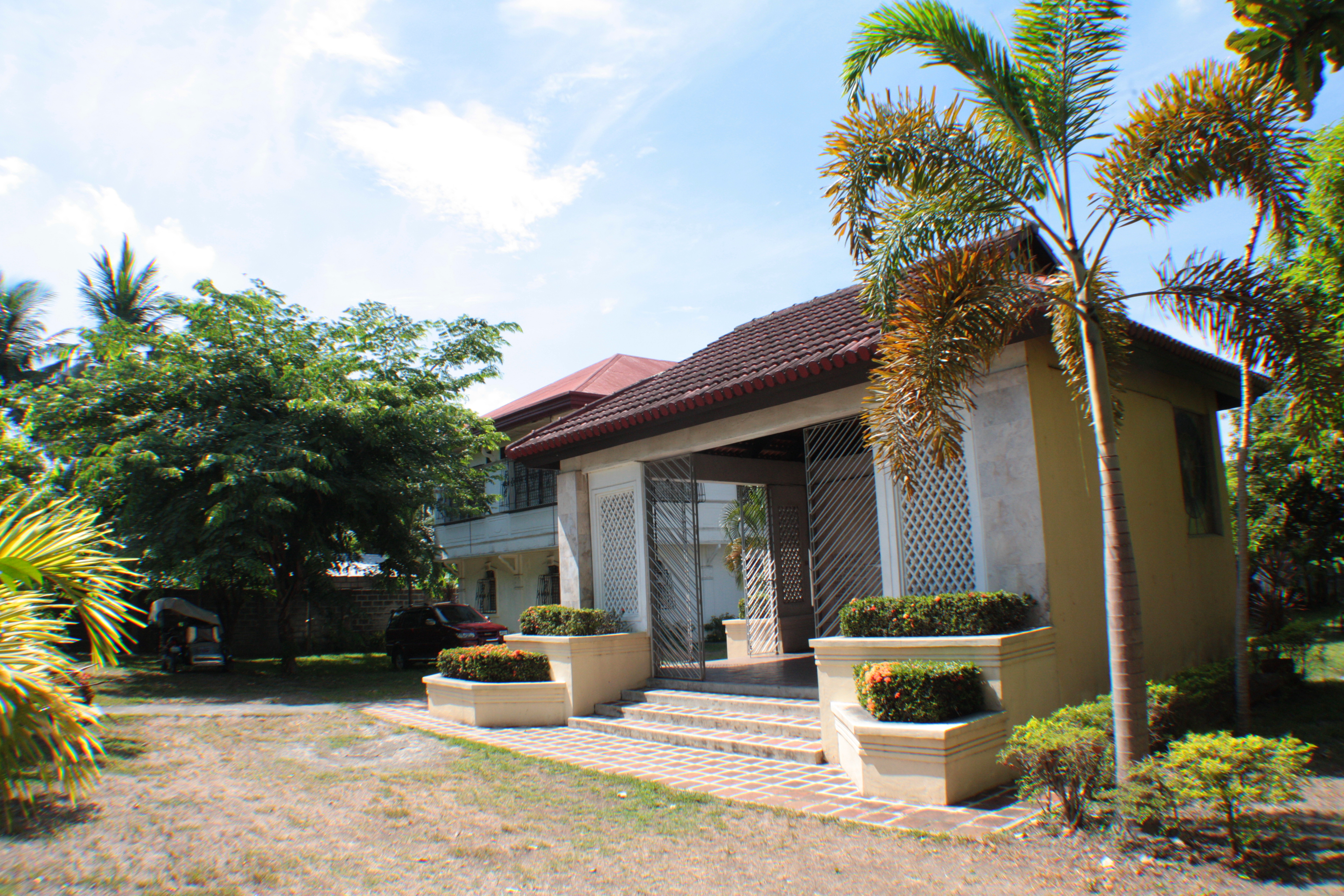
del Pilar Mausoleum

At the center of the 4,027-square-metre (43,350 sq ft) site is the monument of Marcelo H. del Pilar, made by local sculptor Apolinario Bulaong. Made of cement mixed with crushed bronze, the statue stands 10 feet high and beneath it lies the remains of the hero himself, laid to his final resting place in 1984.

=== Del Pilar Mausoleum ===
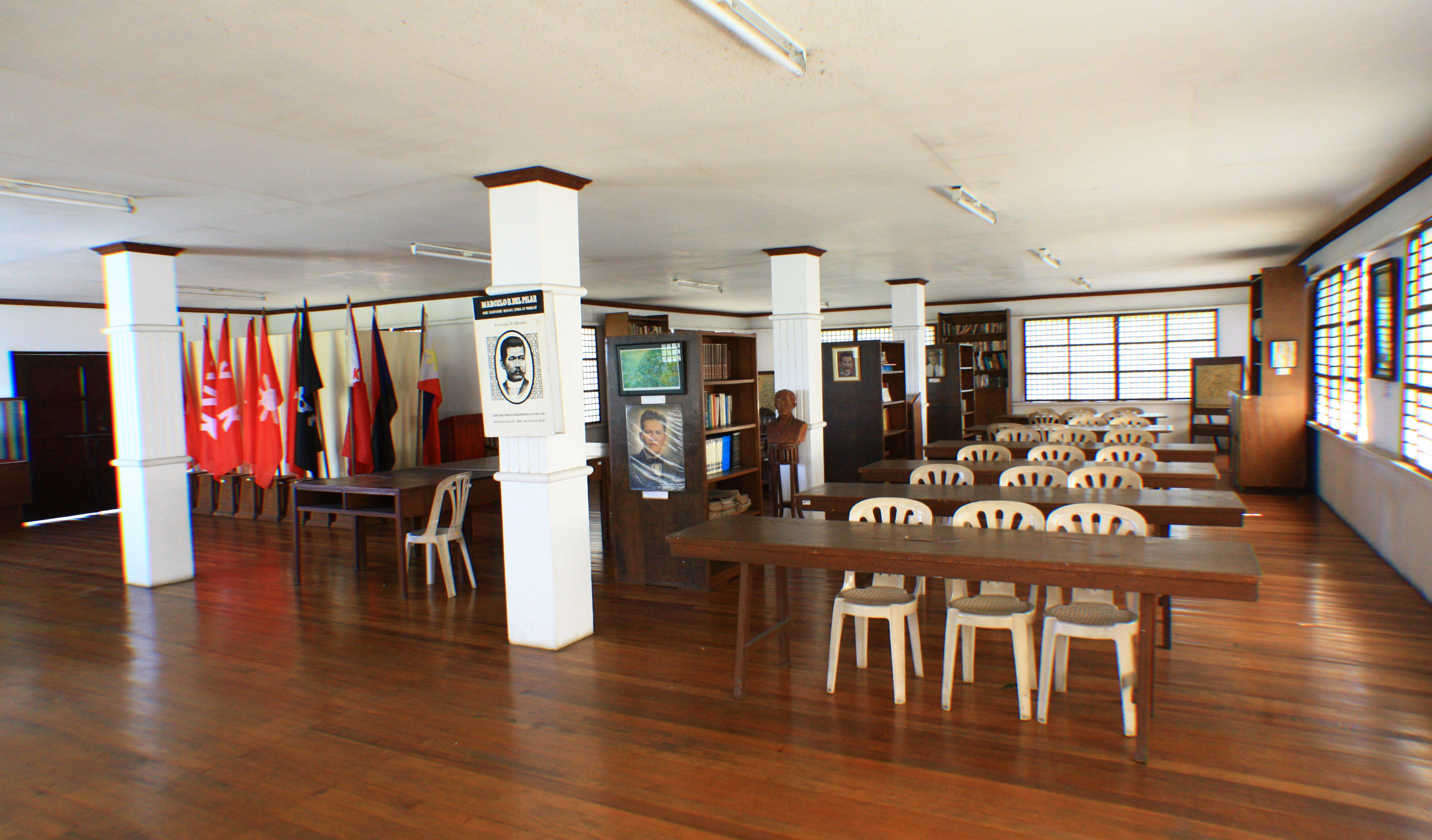
Inside the Museum Library, 2nd floor

Behind the stadium and the monument stands the mausoleum of the del Pilar family. Inside the mausoleum is a family tree of the descendants of Marcelo del Pilar and his wife Marciana. The remains of Marciana and other members of Marcelo's family are also interred in the mausoleum. It is said that some members of the clan visit the site religiously on All Saints’ Day.

=== Museum-Library ===
A two-storey museum library erected in 1998 can be found at the back of the site. The structure, built of modern materials in the style of the traditional bahay-na-bato, showcases displays of Marcelo del Pilar's literary works as well as collections of different kinds of books written by and in commemoration various Filipino heroes. At the second level of the building is the library and gallery of other historical artifacts.

== See also ==
- Marcelo H. del Pilar

== Bibliography ==
- Ma. Guerrero, A. (2007). Bulacañana: A heritage of artistic excellence. Provincial Youth, Sports, Employment, Art and Culture Office (PYSEACO), Provincial Government of Bulacan.
- National Historical Commission of the Philippines. Declaring the birth site of marcelo h. del pilar in bulakan, bulacan as the marcelo h. del pilar national shrine. Retrieved from National Historical Commission of the Philippines
- Santos, M. T. (2001). Aklat ng bayang bulacan. Lathalaing Plaridel. ISBN 971-92439-0-2.
- Valeriano, A. B. (1984). Marcelo H. Del Pilar: Ang Kanyang Buhay, Diwa at Panulat. Samahang Pangkalinangan ng Bulakan, Bulacan as cited in Alex L. Balagtas’ (shrine curator) unpublished work
