= Gobiopterus birtwistlei =

Conservation status
- Data Deficient (IUCN 3.1)

Scientific classification
- Domain: Eukaryota
- Kingdom: Animalia
- Phylum: Chordata
- Class: Actinopterygii
- Order: Gobiiformes
- Family: Oxudercidae
- Genus: Gobiopterus
- Species: G. birtwistlei

Binomial name
- Gobiopterus birtwistlei (Herre, 1935)

Synonyms
- Gobiella birtwistlei Herre, 1935

Species of Fish

Gobiopterus birtwistlei is a species of goby belonging to the genus Gobiopterus. It is endemic to Singapore in the Western Pacific Ocean. According to Fishbase, it is currently the only described species of freshwater fish endemic to Singapore and is one of two described species of fish endemic to Singapore. It is demersal.
