= Marcelo H. del Pilar =

Filipino writer, lawyer, and journalist

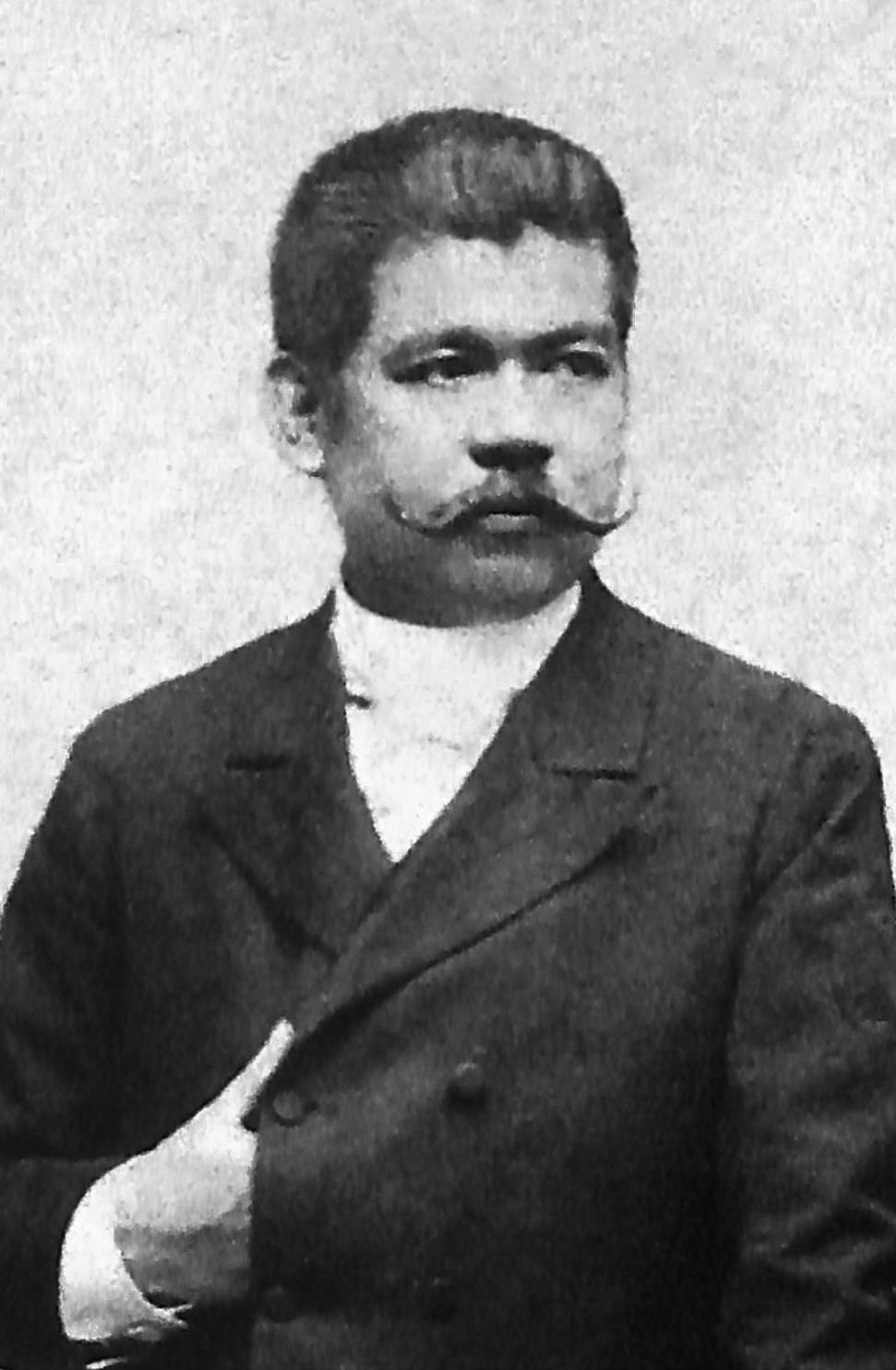
- Del Pilar in Madrid, c. 1890
- Born: Marcelo Hilario del Pilar y Gatmaitán; August 30, 1850; Bulakan, Bulacan, Captaincy General of the Philippines, Spanish Empire
- Died: July 4, 1896 (aged 45); Barcelona, Spain
- Resting place: Marcelo H. del Pilar Shrine, Bulakan, Bulacan
- Other name: Pláridel (pen name)
- Education: Colegio de San Juan de Letran; Colegio de San José; University of Santo Tomas
- Occupations: Writer; lawyer; journalist; freemason
- Organization: La Solidaridad
- Spouse: Marciana del Pilar (m. 1878)
- Children: 7
- Parents: Julián Hilario del Pilar (father); Blasa Gatmaitán (mother)
- Relatives: Toribio H. del Pilar (brother); Gregorio del Pilar (nephew); Deodato Arellano (brother-in-law)

Signature
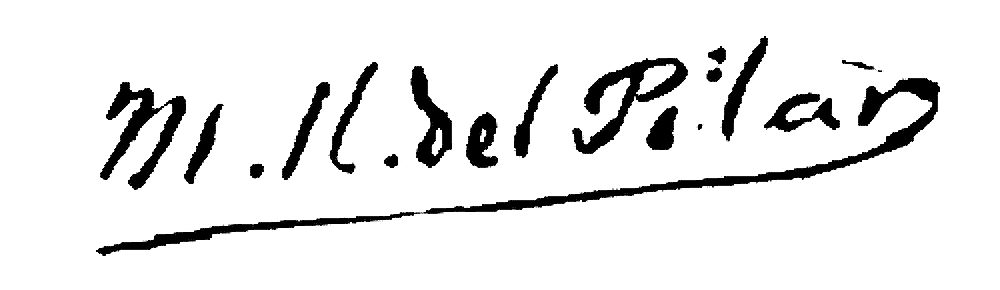

Marcelo Hilario del Pilar y Gatmaitán (Spanish: [maɾˈθelojˈlaɾjo ðel piˈlaɾ]; Tagalog: [maɾˈselo ʔɪˈlaɾjo del pɪˈlaɾ]; August 30, 1850 – July 4, 1896), commonly known as Marcelo H. del Pilar and also known by his nom de plume Pláridel, was a Filipino writer, lawyer, journalist, and freemason. Del Pilar, along with José Rizal and Graciano López Jaena, became known as the leaders of the Reform Movement in Spain.

Del Pilar was born and brought up in Bulakan, Bulacan. He was suspended at the Universidad de Santo Tomás and imprisoned in 1869 after he and the parish priest quarreled over exorbitant baptismal fees. In the mid-1880s, he expanded his anti-friar movement from Malolos to Manila. He went to Spain in 1888 after an order of banishment was issued against him. Twelve months after his arrival in Barcelona, he succeeded López Jaena as editor of the La Solidaridad (The Solidarity). Publication of the newspaper stopped in 1895 due to lack of funds. Losing hope in reforms, he grew favorable of a revolution against Spain. He was on his way home in 1896 when he contracted tuberculosis in Barcelona. He later died in a public hospital and was buried in a pauper's grave.

On November 15, 1995, the Technical Committee of the National Heroes Committee, created through Executive Order No. 5 by former President Fidel V. Ramos, recommended del Pilar along with the eight Filipino historical figures to be National Heroes. The recommendations were submitted to Department of Education Secretary Ricardo T. Gloria on November 22, 1995. No action has been taken for these recommended historical figures. In 2009, this issue was revisited in one of the proceedings of the 14th Congress.

== Biography ==
=== Early life (1850–1880) ===
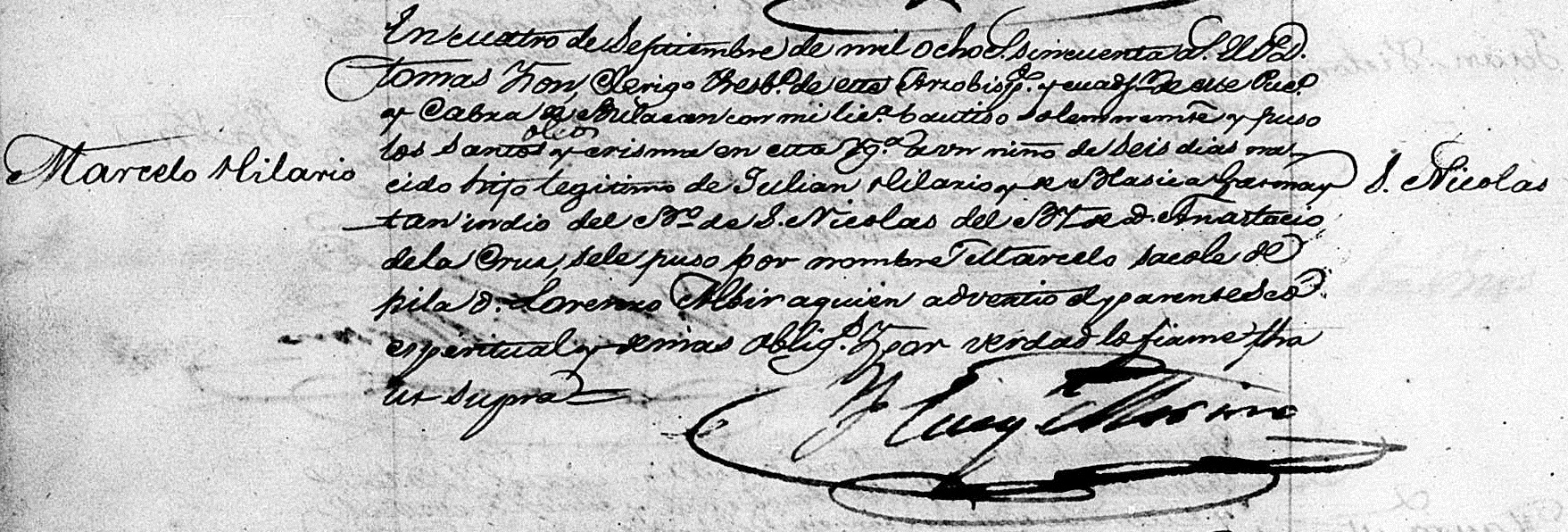
Marcelo H. del Pilar's baptismal register (Book No. 15, Folio 355)

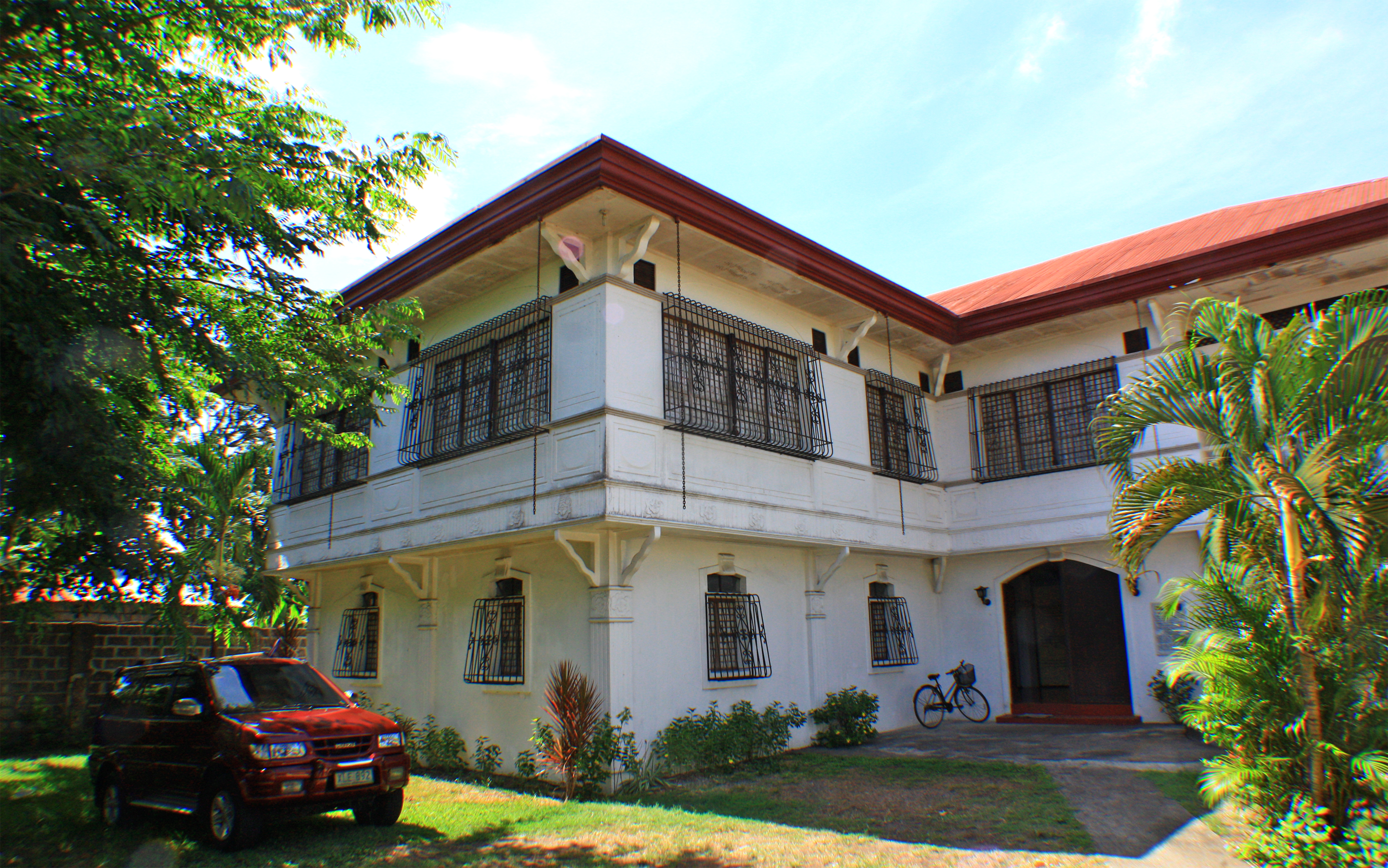
A replica of Marcelo H. del Pilar's ancestral house and birthplace in Bulacán, Bulacan. (Note: The original house was burned by the agents of the friars on August 15, 1889. Del Pilar learned of the incident a year later.)

Marcelo H. del Pilar was born at his family's ancestral home in sitio Cupang, barrio San Nicolás, Bulacán, Bulacan, on August 30, 1850. He was baptized as "Marcelo Hilario" on September 4, 1850, at the Iglesia Parroquial de Nuestra Señora de la Asuncion in Bulacán. Fr. D. Tomas Yson, a Filipino secular priest, performed the baptism, and Lorenzo Alvir, a distant relative, acted as the godfather. "Hilario" was the original paternal surname of the family. The surname of Marcelo's paternal grandmother, "del Pilar", was added to comply with the naming reforms of Governor-General Narciso Clavería in 1849.

Marcelo's parents belonged to the principalía. Both owned vast tracks of rice and sugarcane farms, fish ponds, and an animal-powered mill. Marcelo's father, Julián Hilario del Pilar (1812-1906), was the son of José Hilario del Pilar and María Roqueza. Don Julián was a famous Tagalog grammarian, writer, and speaker. In the municipality of Bulacán, he served as a "three-time" gobernadorcillo of the town's pueblo (1831, 1854, 1864-1865) and later held the position of oficial de mesa of the alcalde mayor. In the early 1830s, Julián met and married Blasa Gatmaitán (1814-1872?), a descendant of an ancient Tagalog nobility. Known as "Doña Blasica", she was the daughter of Nicolas Gatmaitan and Cerapia De Torres. Don Julián and Doña Blasica had ten children: Toribio (priest, deported to the Mariana Islands in 1872), Fernando (father of Gregorio del Pilar), Andrea, Dorotea, Estanislao, Juan, Hilaria (married to Deodato Arellano), Valentín, Marcelo, and María. (Note: The share of the inheritance of each child was very small and del Pilar renounced his in favor of his siblings.)

From an early age, del Pilar learned the violin, the piano, and the flute. (Note: Del Pilar played beautiful pieces on the violin and flute during Flores de Mayo.) He also mastered the palasan or rattan cane. In the mid-1850s, del Pilar received early education from his paternal uncle Alejo del Pilar. He pursued his segunda enseñanza at the Colegio de San Juan de Letran under the tutelage of Sr. Mamerto Natividad. (Note: According to Epifanio de los Santos, del Pilar obtained his Bachiller en Artes degree at the Colegio de San José. Other historians who followed de los Santos' account were: Teodoro A. Agoncillo, Magno S. Gatmaitan, Jaime C. de Veyra, Lea S. Zapanta, John N. Schumacher, and Gregorio F. Zaide.) The subjects he took there were: Poetry, Doctrina Christiana, Spanish grammar, Latin grammar, Elements of Rhetoric, and Principles of Urbanidad. From July 8, 1865 to January 12, 1866, del Pilar studied under Sr. José Flores in Binondo. Afterward, he enrolled at the Universidad de Santo Tomás to study Philosophy. There, del Pilar earned: (1867-1868) Psychology, Fair; Logic, Fair; Moral Philosophy, Fair; Natural History, Good; Arithmetic, Notablemente; Algebra, Very Good; (1868-1869) Metaphysics 1, Very Good; (1869-1870) Metaphysics 2, Very Good; (1870-1871) Physics, Good.

In 1869, del Pilar quarreled with the parish priest of San Miguel over exorbitant baptismal fees. Shortly after the incident, the judge, Sr. Félix García Gavieres, sent del Pilar to Carcel y Presidio Correccional. He was released after thirty days. Afterward, he resumed his studies at the Universidad de Santo Tomás. He obtained his Bachiller en Filosofía on February 16, 1871. Four and a half months later, on July 2, 1871, del Pilar pursued law.

In late 1871, del Pilar joined a group of intellectuals (Note: Aside from del Pilar, notable members of the group were Fr. José Burgos, Antonio María Regidor, Rafael Labra, Antonio Roxas, Pedro Carillo, and Pío Bása.) in Manila. They gathered at Sr. Enrique Genato's almacén, where they frequently talked about the friars, affairs of the Philippines, liberty of nations, fall of the Carlists, insurrections, and wars.

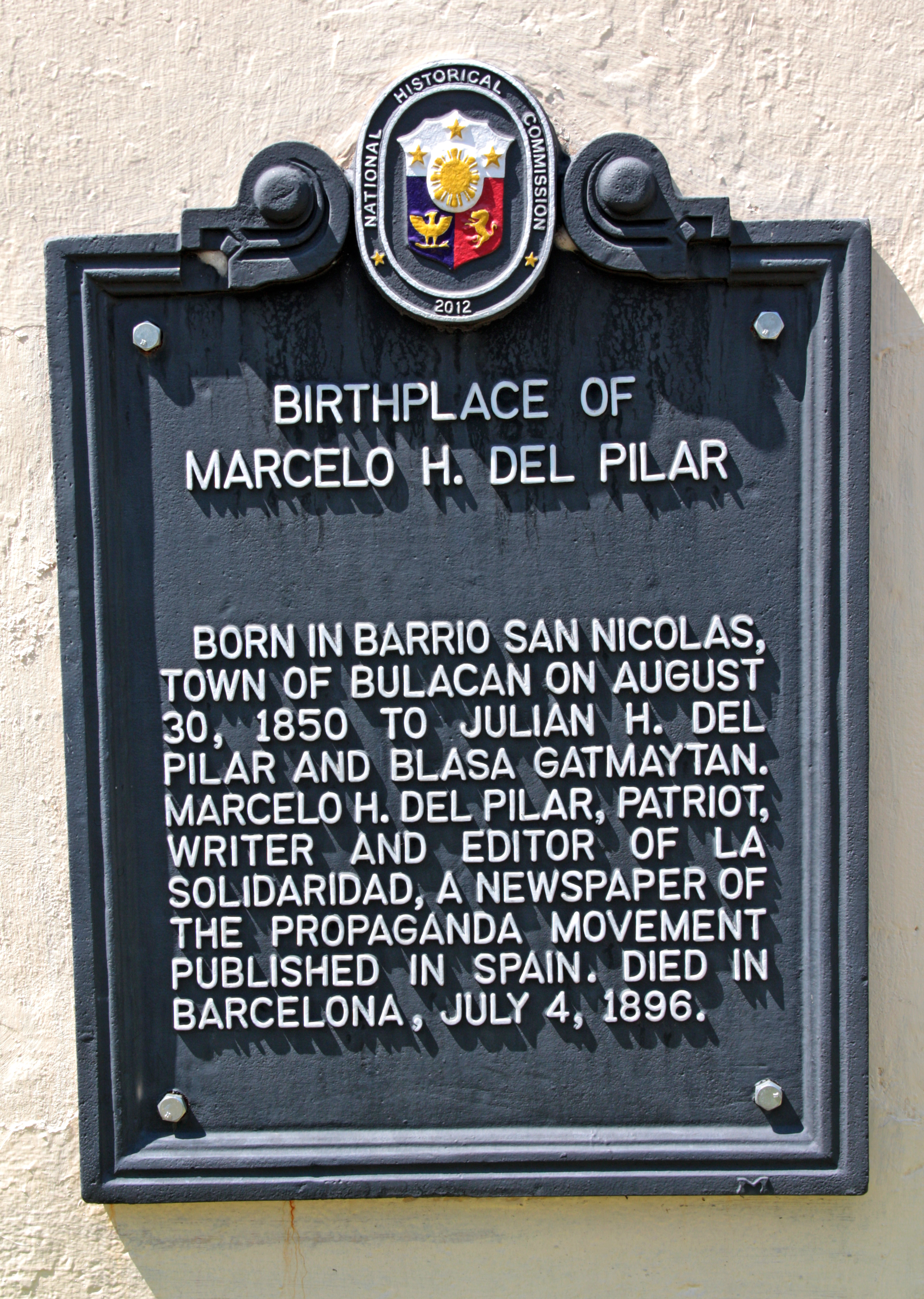
Historical marker installed in 2012 at the Marcelo H. del Pilar Shrine

On the night of January 20, 1872, the Cavite Mutiny broke out at the arsenal of Fort San Felipe. Del Pilar was living with Fr. Mariano V. Sevilla, a Filipino priest who supported the secularization movement in the 1860s and early 1870s. Del Pilar knew that Fr. Sevilla was associated with the Gomburza. To protect Fr. Sevilla from possible arrest and deportation, del Pilar burned all the letters of the former in his quarters. However, some of Fr. Sevilla and Fr. Toribio's letters were found in the quarters of Fr. José Burgos. This resulted in the arrest of both priests on February 21, 1872. As punishment, Fr. Toribio was tortured and dragged from Malolos to Bulacán. Del Pilar begged the authorities to allow his brother to see their sick mother. As expected, they ignored del Pilar and continued with their barbaric actions. On March 14, 1872, Fr. Toribio and Fr. Sevilla were deported to the Mariana Islands along with other Filipino patriots.

Out of school, del Pilar worked as oficial de mesa in Pampanga (1874–1875) and Quiapo (1878–1879). In 1876, he resumed his law studies at the Universidad de Santo Tomás. He obtained his licenciado en jurisprudencia, equivalent to a Bachelor of Laws, on March 4, 1881. In law school, del Pilar earned: (1871-1872) Canon Law 1, Fair; Roman Law 1, Very Good; (1873-1874) Canon Law 2, Fair; Roman Law 2, Excellent; (1876-1877) Civil and Mercantile Law, Very Good; (1877-1878) Extension of Civil Law and Spanish Civil Codes, Very Good; Penal Law, Very Good; (1878-1879) Public Law, Fair; Administrative Law, Fair; Colonial Legislation, Fair; Economics, Fair; Political and Statistics, Fair; (1879-1880) Judicial Procedures, Excellent; Practice and Oratory Forensics 1, Excellent; Elements of General Literature and Spanish Literature, Excellent. No grades were recorded for the years 1880-1881 as del Pilar took six months leave.

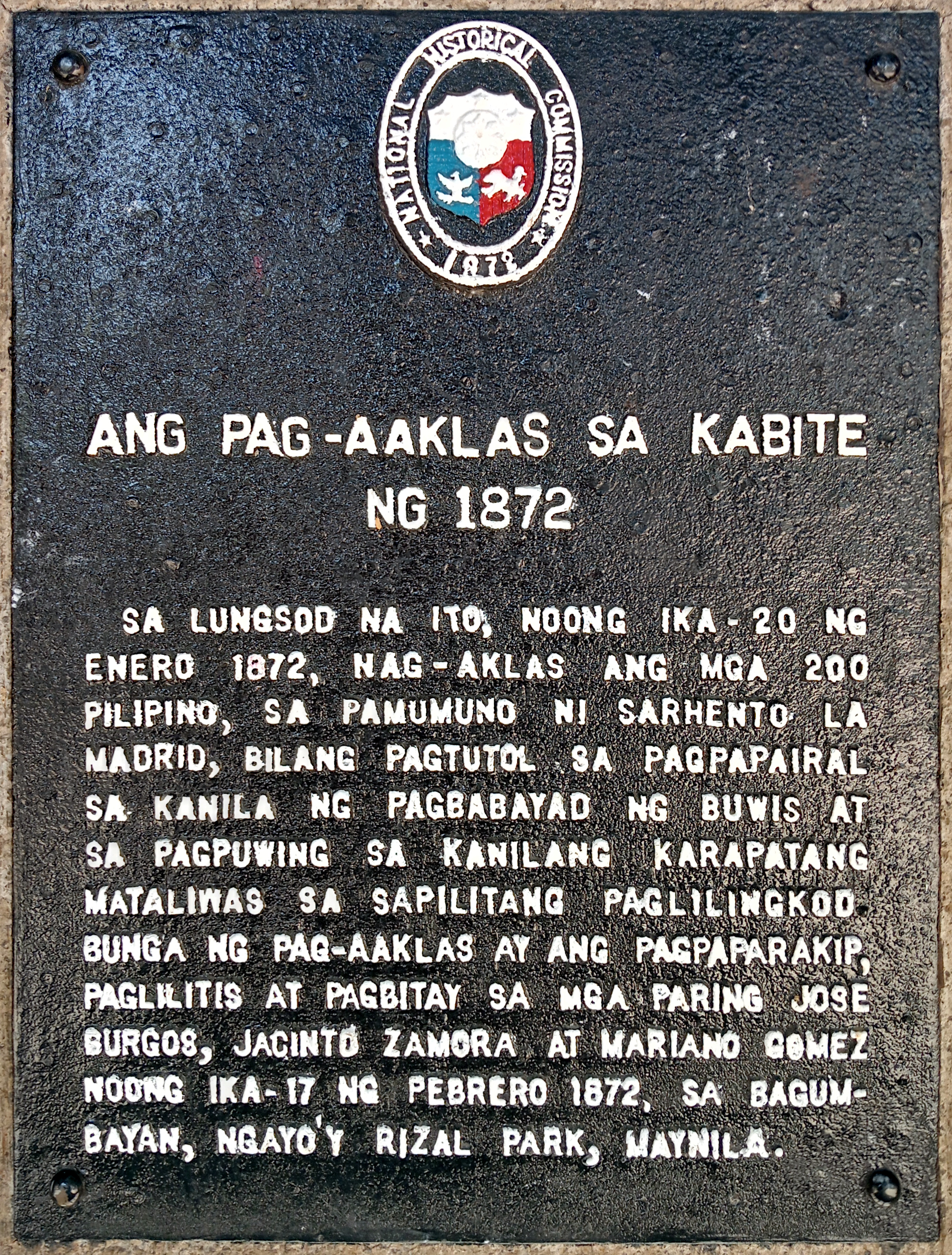
"Ang Pag-aaklas sa Kabite ng 1872" historical marker for the Cavite Mutiny at Fort San Felipe in Cavite City, 1872.

From 1882 to 1887, del Pilar worked as a defense counselor for the Real Audiencia de Manila. During this time he became active in exposing the existing conditions of the Philippines. Del Pilar attended many events such as funeral wakes, baptismal parties, weddings, town fiestas, and cockfights in the cockpits. Using the Tagalog language, he would talk to different kinds of people like laborers, farmers, fishermen, professionals, and businessmen. In his house in Trozo, Tondo, del Pilar preached nationalistic and patriotic ideas to the young students of Manila. Mariano Ponce, a high school student at the time, was one of his active listeners. Other listeners who would later become his disciples were Briccio Pantas, Numeriano Adriano, and Apolinario Mabini.

=== Anti-friar activities in the Philippines (1880–1888) ===
Del Pilar was one of the leading figures of the Philippine anti-friar movement in the late 19th century. After the deportation of his brother in 1872, he worked to destroy the friars' authority and influence on the country's affairs. In La Soberanía Monacal en Filipinas (Monastic Supremacy in the Philippines), del Pilar explained how the friars dominated the economic and political life of the colony:

"The friars control all the fundamental forces of society in the Philippines. They control the educational system, for they own the Universidad de Santo Tomás, and are the local inspectors of every primary school. They control the minds of the people because, in a dominantly Catholic country, the parish rectors can utilize the pulpit and confessionals to publicly or secretly influence the people; they control all the municipal and local authorities and the medium of communication; and they execute all the orders of the central government."

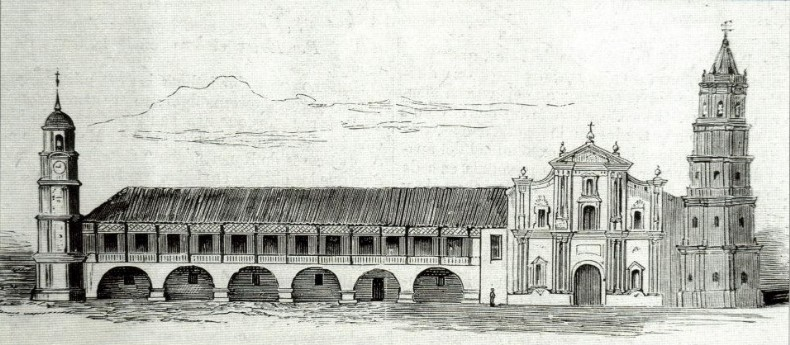
The pre-1863 lithograph photo of Malolos Cathedral before the earthquake that tore down its clock tower in 1863. This was one of the sites of del Pilar's anti-friar activities.

Del Pilar, together with Basilio Teodoro Morán and Pascual H. Poblete, founded the short-lived Diariong Tagalog (Tagalog Newspaper) on June 1, 1882. (Note: According to Wenceslao E. Retana's account, the first issue came out on August 1, 1882.) Diariong Tagalog was the first bilingual newspaper in the Philippines and was financed by the wealthy Spanish liberal Francisco Calvo y Múñoz. Del Pilar became the editor of the Tagalog section. José Rizal's essay, El Amor Patrio, was featured in the Diariong Tagalog on August 20, 1882. Del Pilar translated it into Tagalog language, Ang Pagibig sa Tinubúang Lupà (Love for the Native Land). Diariong Tagalog later experienced financial difficulties and on October 31, 1882, the newspaper ceased publication.

In early 1884, an election for the gobernadorcillo position was held in the city of Malolos. With the support of the liberal Spanish officials of the town, del Pilar and his group managed to elect their candidate, Mariano Crisóstomo, against the candidates supported by the friar-curate. On March 6 of the same year, a Royal Decree which called for the abolition of the tributo was issued. The people who collected the tributes, the cabezas de barangay, were the ones who suffered from this unjust taxation system. They were forced to follow the inaccurate and bloated parochial lists of the friars. They were also obliged to pay for the excess individuals in the mentioned lists. (Note: After the implementation of Sr. Chinchilla's order, del Pilar advised gobernadorcillo Florentino Reyes and the cabezas to approximate the real barangay population. To their surprise, the real barangay census was less than the parish census by three thousand individuals (most of the excess individuals in the parochial lists were cholera victims in the early 1880s).) As a result, most of the cabezas became penniless. On June 30 of the same year, another tax reform was introduced in the Philippines. Sr. Chinchilla, the intendant of finance, proposed a set of regulations (Articles 52 and 53) which prohibited the friars from altering the tax lists of the cabezas de barangay. Despite the massive support it received, its implementation did not last long. Sr. Chinchilla, after leaving his office, was immediately replaced by Sr. Luna, a pro-friar. The citizens of Malolos, particularly del Pilar, denounced Sr. Luna's measures, and shortly after the latter canceled Sr. Chinchilla's regulations, the whole townsfolk protested. Not much later, the cabezas de barangay of Malolos confronted the parish priest on the list of taxpayers. The cabezas and the priest argued about the legal terminology of asesorar (to advise), but the latter, Fr. Felipe García, resolved the matter by declaring asesorar (to advise) as confrontar (to confront). On July 16, 1885, the cabezas and the parish priest clashed again. The cabezas interpreted confrontar as cotejar (to compare) while Fr. García declared confrontar as copiar (to copy). Refusing to copy the parochial lists, the cabezas appealed to Vicente Pardo y Bonanza, the alcalde mayor. Sr. Pardo rejected their plea, and like Sr. Luna, took the side of the friars. Despite these setbacks, del Pilar and his group managed to expand their anti-friar activities to Manila and nearby provinces.

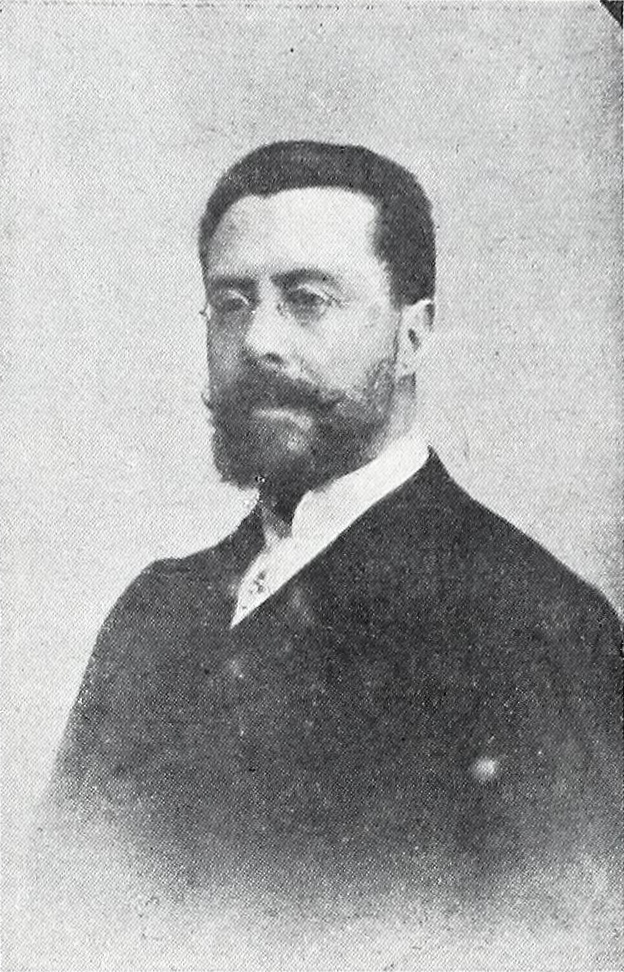
Benigno Quiroga, the Director General of Civil Administration in Manila. Photographed in 1894.

In 1887, during the upcoming fiesta of Our Lady of the Rosary in Binondo, a conflict arose between the gremio de naturales (Native guild), the gremio de chinos (Chinese guild), and the gremio de mestizos de sangley (Chinese mestizo guild). The gobernadorcillo de naturales (native governor) of Binondo, Timoteo Lanuza, wanted the friar-curate of Binondo, Fr. José Hevía de Campomanes, to prioritize the natives over the Chinese in the fiesta. Fr. Hevía, who sided with the Chinese, did not allow Lanuza's request. According to Fr. Hevía, the Chinese and the mestizos should lead the fiesta, because of their past contributions to the construction of the Binondo Church. On September 30, 1887, Lanuza, with the secret assistance of del Pilar and José Centeno García (the civil governor of Manila), wrote a petition to Governor-General Emilio Terrero, demanding the natives' right to manage the fiesta. Terrero, a liberal and anti-clerical, approved the petition. He decreed that the gobernadorcillos de naturales should lead all public functions in the country. Embittered by Terrero's decision, Fr. Hevía did not attend the celebration. Most of the attendees of the fiesta were the natives and the gobernadorcillos de naturales of Manila. Insulted by Fr. Hevía's action, Terrero removed him as friar-curate of Binondo. All the gobernadorcillos of the Chinese and the mestizos were also removed. The organizer of the fiesta, Juan Zulueta, relied on the instructions of del Pilar.

In October 1887, during a deadly cholera epidemic, another tension arose between del Pilar's group and the friars. To limit the spread of the epidemic, Benigno Quiroga y López Ballesteros had issued a ban against the entry of cadavers into the churches. The ban took effect on October 18, 1887. In Malolos, gobernadorcillo Manuel Crisóstomo announced Quiroga's decree by means of a bellman. Fr. Felipe García, the friar-curate of Malolos, violated the ban, purportedly because of the fees which the church earned from the funeral wakes. In protest, he paraded through the streets of Malolos the corpse of a cholera victim. The authorities and citizens of Malolos were displeased by Fr. García's action; shortly after the parade, a riot almost broke out. To control the situation, Crisóstomo sought advice from del Pilar. Afterward, Crisóstomo reported to the office of Manuel Gómez Florio, the Spanish governor of Bulacan. Gómez Florio, an ally of del Pilar and the Malolos reformists, ordered the arrest of Fr. García. Other friars who violated the ban were reprimanded by the authorities.

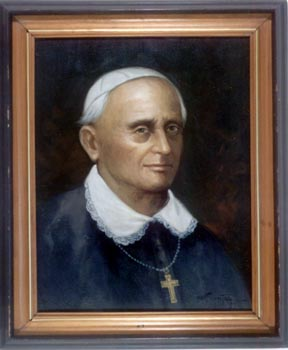
Pedro Payo y Piñeiro, O.P. (1814–1889) was the 24th Archbishop of Manila who took charge in 1876 until his death in 1889.

In early 1888, the friars' power was again challenged by the anti-friar forces. On January 21 that year, a memorial to establish a school of "Arts, Trades, and Agriculture" was forwarded by del Pilar to the gobernador civil of Bulacan. Signed by the residents of the pueblos of the province, this was supported by liberal officials like Terrero, Quiroga, Centeno, Gómez Florio, and Julio Galindo (the captain of the Guardia Civil). In 1883, the original plan was to establish an orphan asylum managed by the Augustinian friars and financed by the government. When the plan was revised to a school of "Arts, Trades, and Agriculture", the Augustinians protested. Quiroga then warned the Augustinians that the project will be managed by the government and not by the church. This angered the Augustinians and the archbishop of Manila even more and they planned to boycott the school's establishment. Despite their efforts, the school of agriculture opened in Manila the following year. This incident was another victory for del Pilar and his group.

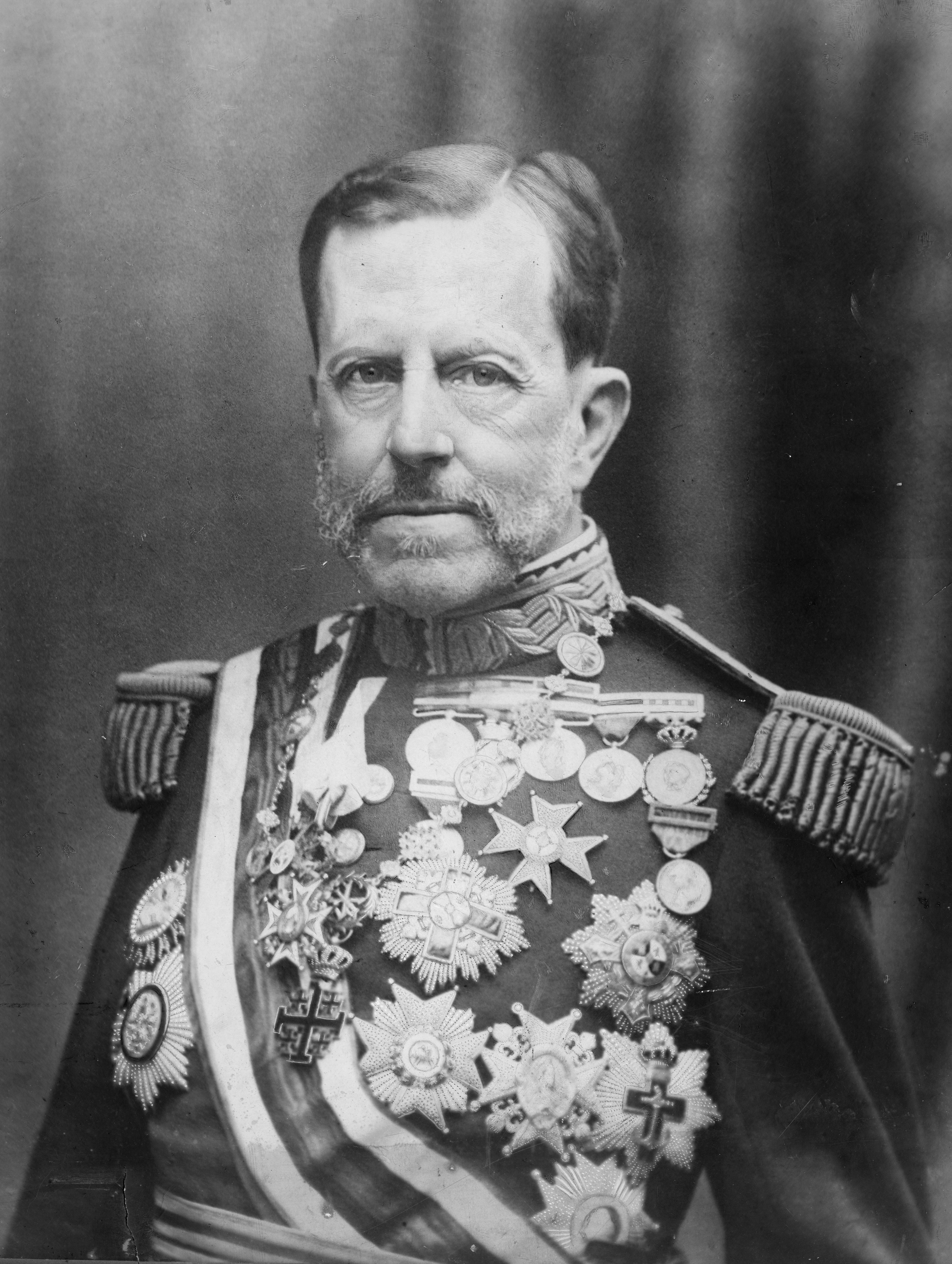
Valeriano Weyler y Nicolau, the 92nd Governor-General of the Philippines, c. 1890

In 1887 and 1888, del Pilar wrote a series of anti-friar petitions to the colonial authorities and the Queen Regent. On November 20 and 21, 1887, he wrote the complaints of two Navotas residents, that of Mateo Mariano (Note: Unable to pay the stole fees charged by the friar, Mateo Mariano was punished by beating.) and the gobernadorcillo de naturales of Navotas, to the civil governor. Del Pilar also prepared, on February 20, 1888, the petition of the gobernadorcillos and residents of Manila to the Governor-General. (Note: Before the preparation of this petition, Cándido García, a resident of Pandacan, approached del Pilar and the governor of Manila. He worried about being imprisoned after reporting to the gobernadorcillo the abuses of the friar-curate which included the collection of excessive fees for scapulars and novenas.) On March 1, 1888, the residents of the districts of Manila and the nearby provinces, led by Doroteo Cortés and José Anacleto Ramos, marched to the office of Centeno. They presented a manifesto addressed to the Queen Regent. This manifesto, entitled Viva España! Viva el Rey! Viva el Ejército! Fuera los Frailes! (Long live Spain! Long live the King! Long live the Army! Throw the friars out!), was believed to be written by Cortés and del Pilar. It demanded the friars' expulsion from the Philippines including Manila Archbishop Pedro P. Payo. (Note: Most of the signers of the anti-friar petition did not know how to read and write Spanish.) A few days later, Centeno resigned as civil governor of Manila. Governor-General Terrero's term also ended the following month. General Antonio Moltó, Terrero's successor, ordered the arrest of the organizers of the anti-friar demonstration, abolished Quiroga's decree on funerals, and pardoned Fr. Hevía for his previous offenses. These measures, however, did not affect del Pilar and his group. They continued their anti-friar activities in Malolos where they managed to elect Vicente Gatmaitán as Manuel Crisóstomo's successor. (Note: Vicente Gatmaitán was the brother-in-law of both Crisóstomo and del Pilar.)

Fr. José Rodríguez, an Augustinian parish priest, authored a pamphlet entitled ¡Caiñgat Cayó!: Sa mañga masasamang libro,t, casulatan (Beware!: of bad books and writings, 1888). The friar warned the Filipinos that in reading Rizal's Noli Me Tángere (Touch Me Not) they commit "mortal sin". On August 3 of the same year, del Pilar wrote Caiigat Cayó (Be as Slippery as an Eel) under the pen name Dolores Manapat. It was a reply to Fr. Rodríguez's ¡Caiñgat Cayó!. (Note: In Caiigat Cayó, del Pilar compares Fr. José Rodríguez to the igat, a freshwater eel.)

Valeriano Weyler succeeded Moltó as the Governor-General of the Philippines. Known as The Butcher, Weyler ordered the arrest and deportation of the participants of the anti-friar demonstration. Even Spanish officials were not spared. A few days after Weyler's arrival, Manuel Gómez Florio, the Spanish governor of Bulacan, was removed from his position. An arrest warrant was issued against del Pilar, accusing him of being a filibustero and heretic. Upon the advice of his friends and relatives, del Pilar left Manila for Spain on October 28, 1888. The night before he left the country, del Pilar stayed at the house of his fellow Bulaqueño, Pedro Serrano y Lactao. (Note: Pedro Serrano y Lactao was a school teacher, writer, and lexicographer. A staff of El Heraldo de la Revolución, he wrote the Diccionario Hispano-Tagalog and Estudios Gramaticales Sobre la Lengua Tagala. Serrano wrote under several pseudonyms: R.O. Serna, P. Doré, and S. L'Aktaw.) Together with Rafael Enriquez, they wrote the Dasalan at Tocsohan (Prayers and Mockeries), a mock-prayer book satirizing the Spanish friars. They also wrote the Pasióng Dapat Ipag-alab nang Puso nang Tauong Babasa sa Calupitán nang Fraile (The Passion that Should Inflame the Hearts of Those Who Read About the Cruelty of the Friars). (Note: Rizal's La Visión de Fr. Rodríguez and Por Teléfono were inspired by the Dasalan at Tocsohan and Pasióng Dapat Ipag-alab nang Puso nang Tauong Babasa sa Calupitán nang Fraile.) Gregorio del Pilar, del Pilar's nephew, helped distribute these pamphlets in the churches. There was one incident in Malolos, where Gregorio stole copies of Fr. José Rodríguez's Cuestiones de Sumo Interes (Questions of Supreme Interest) from Fr. Felipe García, who had a habit of distributing counter-revolutionary materials after mass. These books were set to be distributed after the mass. Gregorio removed the book covers of Cuestiones de Sumo Interes and pasted Marcelo's pamphlets inside before distributing them after.

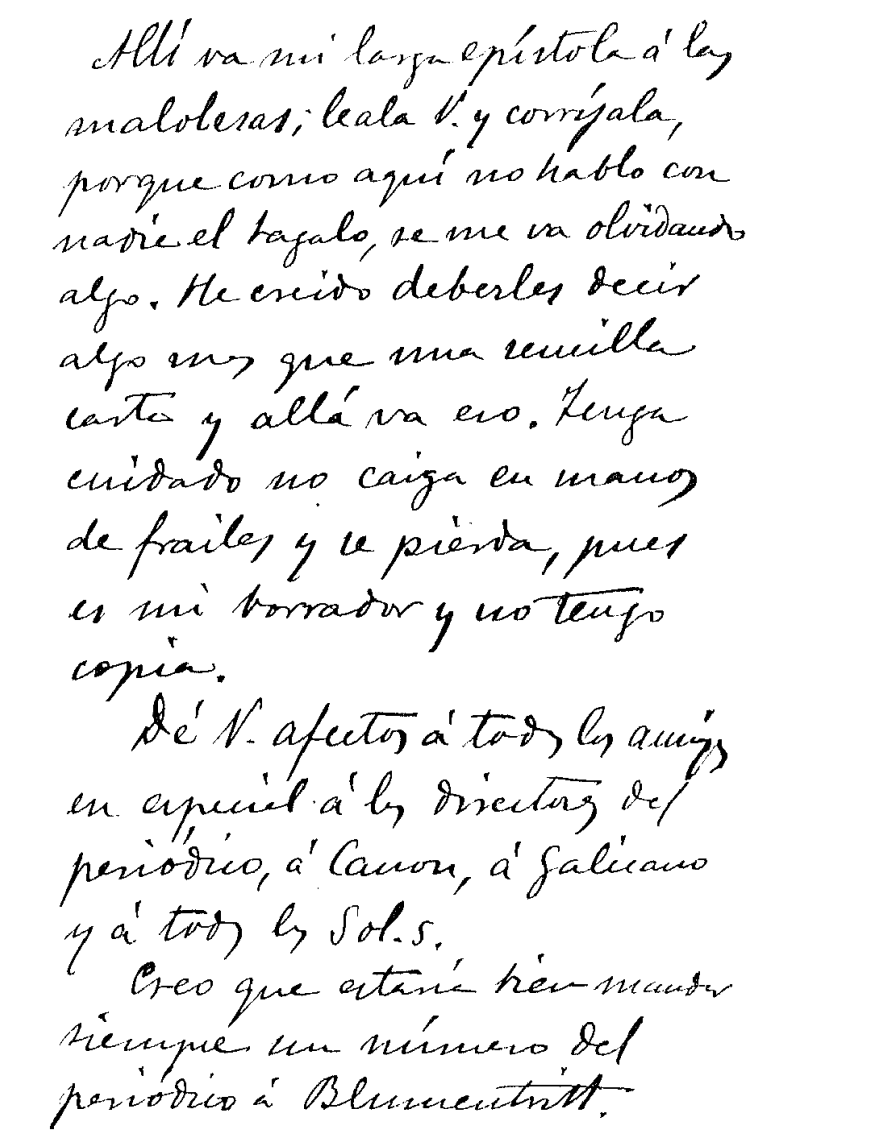
Facsimile of the letter written by Rizal while in London, dated February 22, 1889, and addressed to del Pilar.

Shortly before his departure, del Pilar formed the Caja de Jesús, María y José. Its objective was to continue propaganda and provide education to indigent children. He managed it with the help of compatriots Mariano Ponce, Gregorio Santillán, Mariano Crisóstomo, Pedro Serrano y Lactao, José Gatmaitán, Briccio Pantas, Teodoro Sandiko, Apolinario Mabini, Numeriano Adriano, Doroteo Cortés, Ambrosio Rianzares Bautista, Domingo Franco, Mamerto Natividad, Mariano Alejandrino, Marcelino Santos, Modesto Español, Juan Zulueta, Graciano Bautista, Pedro Dandan, and Fr. Rafael Canlapán (the coadjutor of Malolos from 1885 to 1893). Caja de Jesús, María y José was later discontinued and replaced by Comité de Propaganda (Committee of Propaganda) in Manila. (Note: Members of the Comité de Propaganda were Gregorio Santillán, José A. Ramos, Doroteo Cortés, Ambrosio Rianzares Bautista, Pedro Serrano y Lactao, Basilio Teodoro Morán, and Deodato Arellano. Del Pilar acted as the committee's delegate in Europe.)

=== Propaganda movement in Spain (1888–1895) ===
Del Pilar arrived in Barcelona on January 1, 1889. He headed the political section of the Asociación Hispano-Filipina de Madrid (Hispanic Filipino Association of Madrid), an organization of Filipino and Spanish liberals. On February 17, 1889, del Pilar wrote a letter to Rizal, praising the young women of Malolos for their bravery. These twenty-one young women asked the permission of Governor-General Weyler to allow them to open a night school where they could learn to read and write Spanish. With Weyler's approval and over the objections of Fr. Felipe García, the night school opened in 1889. Del Pilar urged Rizal to write a letter in Tagalog to "las muchachas de Malolos," adding that it would be "a help for our champions there and in Manila." In his reply to del Pilar, Rizal shared the handwritten manuscript of the letter he wrote to "las malolesas."

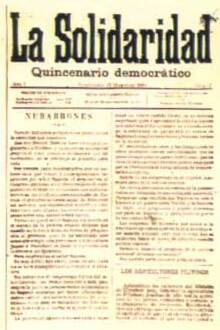
A fortnightly and a bi-weekly newspaper, La Solidaridad serves as the principal organ of the Reform Movement. (Note: Copies of La Solidaridad were smuggled into the Philippines by José María Bása.)

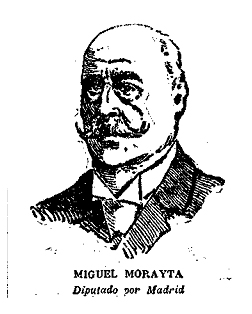
Illustration of Miguel Morayta y Sagrario in El País. Issue of March 25, 1903.

On April 16, 1889, del Pilar met Miguel Morayta y Sagrario in Barcelona. Morayta, an anticlerical and follower of Emilio Castelar, was one of the Spanish liberals who supported the Filipino cause. (Note: Newspapers such as El País, El Globo, El Nuevo Régimen, El Día, El Diluvio, El Imparcial, El Liberal, El Noticiero Universal, El Resumen, El Suplemento, La Correspondencia Militar, La Justicia, La Vanguardia, and La Publicidad (Morayta's newspaper) supplemented the La Solidaridad.) He was the History Professor of Rizal at the Universidad Central de Madrid and Grand Master of Masons of the Gran Oriente Español. On April 25, 1889, a banquet honoring Morayta was held by del Pilar and other Filipinos in Spain.

In the mid-1889, to further damage the friars' influence and authority in the Philippines, del Pilar and his associates sponsored Fr. Nicolás Manrique Alonso Lallave, an ex-Dominican friar (now a Protestant pastor) assigned in Urdaneta, Pangasinan. (Note: Lallave was also known for translating the Gospel of Luke into Pangasinan language (this was the first ever translation of a complete portion of the Bible in a Philippine language).) Governor-General Rafael Izquierdo deported Lallave to Spain after the latter supported the 1870 decree of Segismundo Moret. In 1872, Lallave wrote an inflammatory pamphlet, entitled Los Frailes en Filipinas (The Friars in the Philippines), wherein he exposed the atrocities of the friars and asked for the termination of the religious orders. He returned to the Philippines in 1889 to establish a Protestant chapel in Manila. Del Pilar wanted to help Lallave through Serrano y Lactao and Sandiko, but before help arrived, the priest died of an illness on June 5, 1889. Some scholars believe that the friars poisoned Lallave.

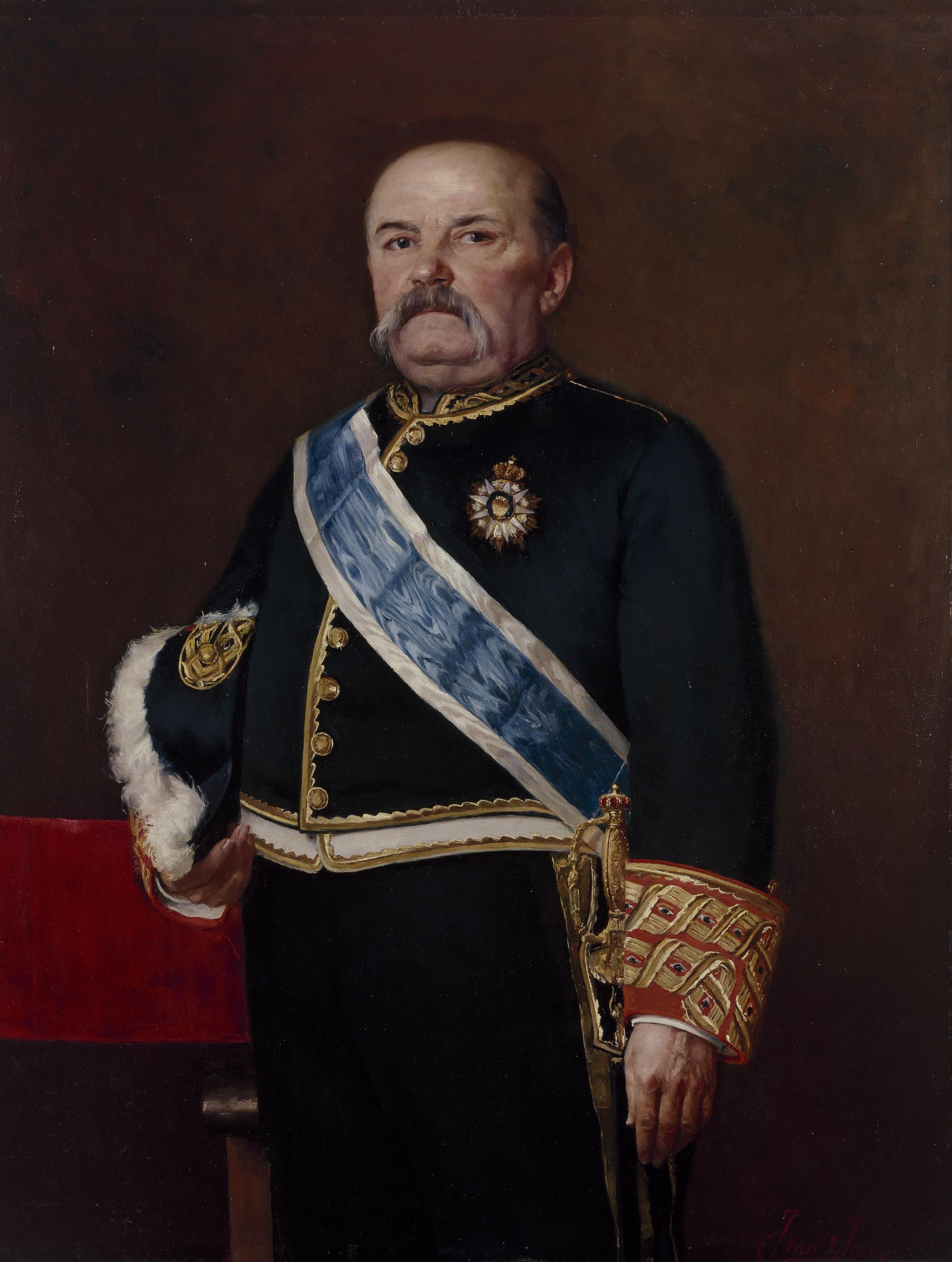
Manuel Becerra, a Spanish politician and revolutionary.

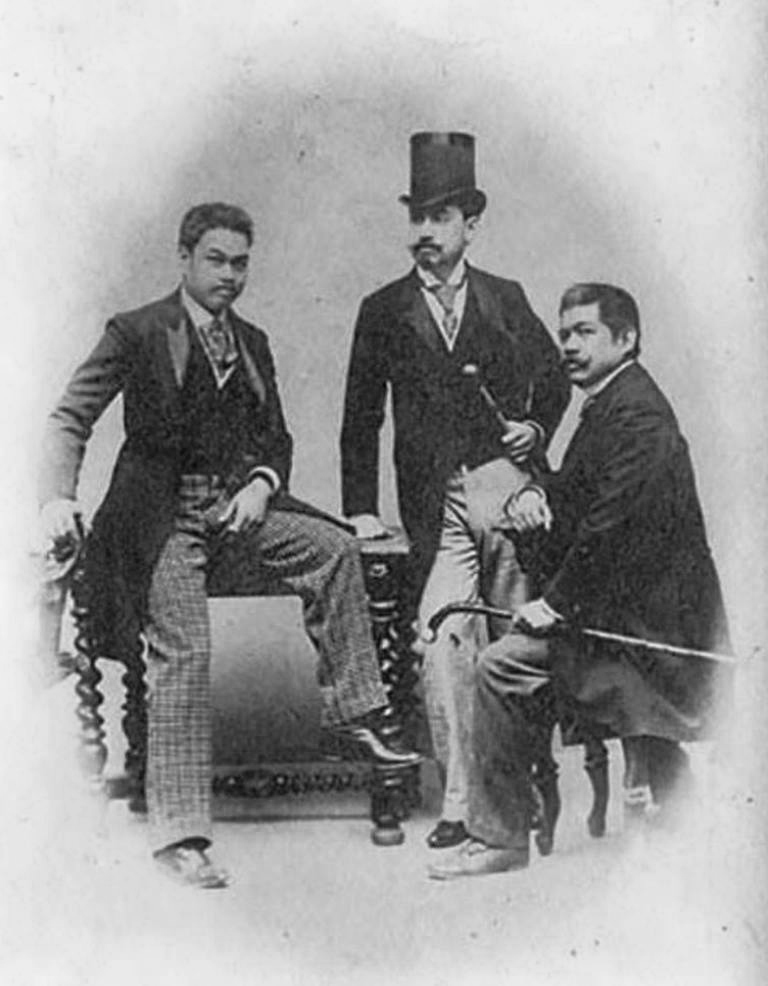
Del Pilar with fellow reformists Antonio Luna (left) and Eduardo de Lete (center). Photographed in 1890.

On December 15, 1889, del Pilar succeeded Graciano López Jaena as editor of the La Solidaridad. (Note: When del Pilar assumed the editorship of La Solidaridad, he transferred the editorial office from Barcelona to Madrid.) Under his editorship, the aims of the newspaper expanded. Using propaganda, it pursued the desires for: assimilation of the Philippines as a province of Spain; removal of the friars and the secularization of the parishes; freedom of assembly and speech; equality before the law; and Philippine representation in the Cortes, the legislature of Spain. A tireless editor, del Pilar wrote under several pseudonyms: Pláridel, Dolores Manapat, Piping Dilat, Siling Labuyo, Cupang, Maytiyaga, Patos, Carmelo, D.A. Murgas, L.O. Crame, Selong, M. Calero, Felipeno, Hilario, Pudpoh, Gregoria de Luna, Dolores Manaksak, M. Dati, and VZKKQJC.

In February 1890, del Pilar met a former Diariong Tagalog colleague, Francisco Calvo y Múñoz. Calvo y Múñoz was one of the Spanish liberals who helped del Pilar in the campaign for the Philippine representation. Calvo y Múñoz's first efforts were on March 3, 1890. At the time he presented to the members of the Cortes an amendment to Article 25 of the Spanish Universal Suffrage Bill. Signed by six deputies, Calvo y Múñoz's amendment called for the restoration of the Philippine parliamentary representation and the election of three deputies from the Philippines. Famous Spanish politicians and liberals were present during Calvo y Múñoz's presentation: Manuel Becerra, the overseas minister under Práxedes Mateo Sagasta; and Antonio Ramos Calderón, a member of Sagasta's Liberal Party. Both spoke after Calvo y Múñoz's presentation. They praised Calvo y Múñoz's intention to restore the Philippine parliamentary representation; however, the two rejected the amendment's early implementation. Despite their statements and judgments, del Pilar, with the help of the Asociación Hispano-Filipina de Madrid, held banquets in honor of Calvo y Múñoz, Becerra, and Ramos Calderón. Del Pilar also featured their speeches in the next issue of La Solidaridad. In a letter dated April 29, 1890, del Pilar said that if Agustín de Burgos y Llamas will succeed Weyler as Governor-General, he may appoint Calvo y Múñoz as the new Director-General of Civil Administration but first the latter should introduce the bill on Philippine representation to the Cortes. Calvo y Múñoz agreed with del Pilar's advice and proposed a more considerate bill the next month. While Calvo y Múñoz was away, del Pilar talked to many deputies to assist in the approval of the bill. On July 3, 1890, the bill's passage was halted after the liberal Sagasta was replaced by the conservative Antonio Cánovas del Castillo as Prime Minister of Spain. Del Pilar maintained good relations with the Liberals despite the fell of Sagasta.

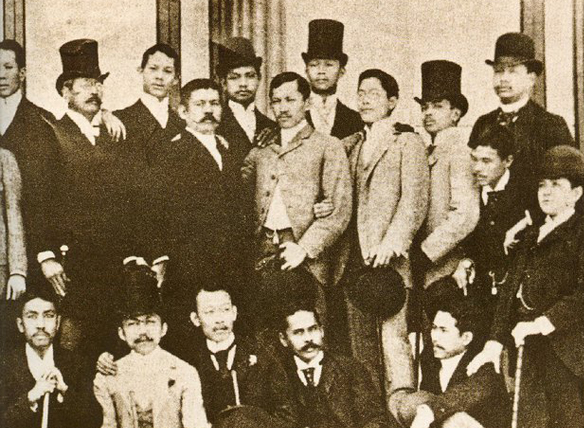
Del Pilar standing beside Rizal (at the center) for a group portrait in Madrid, Spain. Photographed in 1890.

In the late 1890, a rivalry developed between del Pilar and Rizal. This was mainly due to the difference between del Pilar's editorial policy and Rizal's political beliefs. On January 1, 1891, about 90 Filipinos gathered in Madrid. They agreed that a Responsable (leader) be elected. Camps were drawn into two, the Pilaristas and the Rizalistas. The first voting for the Responsable started on the first week of February 1891. Rizal won the first two elections but the votes counted for him did not reach the needed two-thirds vote fraction. After Mariano Ponce, instructed by del Pilar, pleaded to the Pilaristas, Rizal was elected Responsable. Rizal, knowing the Pilaristas did not like his political beliefs, respectfully declined the position and transferred it to del Pilar. He then packed up his bags and boarded a train leaving for Biarritz, France. Inactive in the Reform Movement, Rizal ceased his contribution of articles on La Solidaridad.

After the incident, del Pilar wrote a letter of apology to Rizal. Rizal responded and said that he stopped writing for La Solidaridad for reasons: first, he needed time to work on his second novel El filibusterismo (The Reign of Greed); second, he wanted other Filipinos in Spain to work also; and lastly, he could not lead an organization without solidarity in work. Del Pilar and Rizal continued to correspond until the latter's exile to Dapitan in July 1892.

In his later years, del Pilar rejected the assimilationist stand. Writing to his brother-in-law Deodato Arellano on March 31, 1891, he explained his ultimate goal:

"In the Filipino colony there should be no division, nor is there: one are the sentiments which move us, one the ideals we pursue; the abolition in the Philippines of every obstacle to our liberties, and in due time and by the proper method, the abolition of the flag of Spain as well."

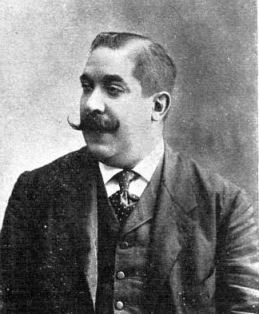
Emilio Junoy, c. 1906.

On December 11, 1892, Sagasta returned as Prime Minister of Spain with Antonio Maura as the new overseas minister. On December 15, 1892, and January 15, 1893, del Pilar published two articles on La Solidaridad, entitled Ya es tiempo (Is it About Time!) and Insistimos (We Insist), wherein he reminisced the Liberals' pledges and the amendment introduced by Calvo y Múñoz in 1890. Months later, Maura passed two decrees in the Philippines, all put into effect in 1895. The first decree, The Royal Decree of May 19, 1893, was a law that laid the basic foundations for municipal government in the Philippines. It established tribunales, municipales and juntas provinciales. The second decree, The Royal Decree of February 13, 1894, was known as the Maura Act and grew out of a proposal made in the 1820s by Manuel Bernaldez, a long-serving colonial official. Its preamble declared that it would "insure to the natives, in the future, whenever it may be possible, the necessary land for cultivation, in accordance with traditional usages." Despite the passage of these laws, talks regarding the Philippine representation were not entertained. In March 1894, Maura resigned as overseas minister and was replaced by Becerra. Becerra, however, became less sympathetic on the representation of the Philippines and the reforms he proposed. Knowing this, del Pilar approached Emilio Junoy, a friendly deputy and editor-in-chief of La Publicidad. (Note: Junoy was a long time friend of the Filipino reformists in Spain. When Mariano Ponce's house was raided by the police in 1890, Junoy acted as his lawyer. He was one of the founders of the Partido Republicano Histórico.) On February 21, 1895, Junoy presented to the Cortes a petition bearing seven thousand signatures. (Note: The petition asked for thirty-one deputies and eleven senators to represent the Philippines.) Two weeks later, on March 8, 1895, Junoy delivered a speech to the Spanish Congress wherein he discussed a proposed bill representing the Philippines. On March 23, 1895, Cánovas del Castillo replaced Sagasta again as Prime Minister of Spain thus ending the chances of the bill being implemented.

After years of publication from 1889 to 1895, funding for the La Solidaridad became scarce. Comité de Propaganda's contribution to the newspaper stopped and del Pilar funded the newspaper almost on his own. Advised by Mabini, (Note: Apolinario Mabini was del Pilar's regular correspondent in Manila. In September 1894, he became the secretary of the Cuerpo de Compromisarios.) del Pilar stopped the publication of La Solidaridad on November 15, 1895, with 7 volumes and 160 issues. In del Pilar's farewell editorial, he said:

"Facing the obstacles that the reactionary persecutions bring in opposition to the circulation of this newspaper in the Philippines, we have to suspend our publication for some time. Nowadays, when there are ways to curb difficulties, we will not stop working to overcome them. We are persuaded that no sacrifices are too little to win the rights and the liberty of a nation that is oppressed by slavery. We work within the law and thus will we continue publishing this newspaper whether here or abroad, depending on the exigencies of the fight wherein Filipino reactionaries have come to impress upon all Filipinos that in its soul there beats some sentiment of dignity and shame. Whether here or abroad, we will continue developing our program."

=== Later years, illness, and death (1895–1896) ===
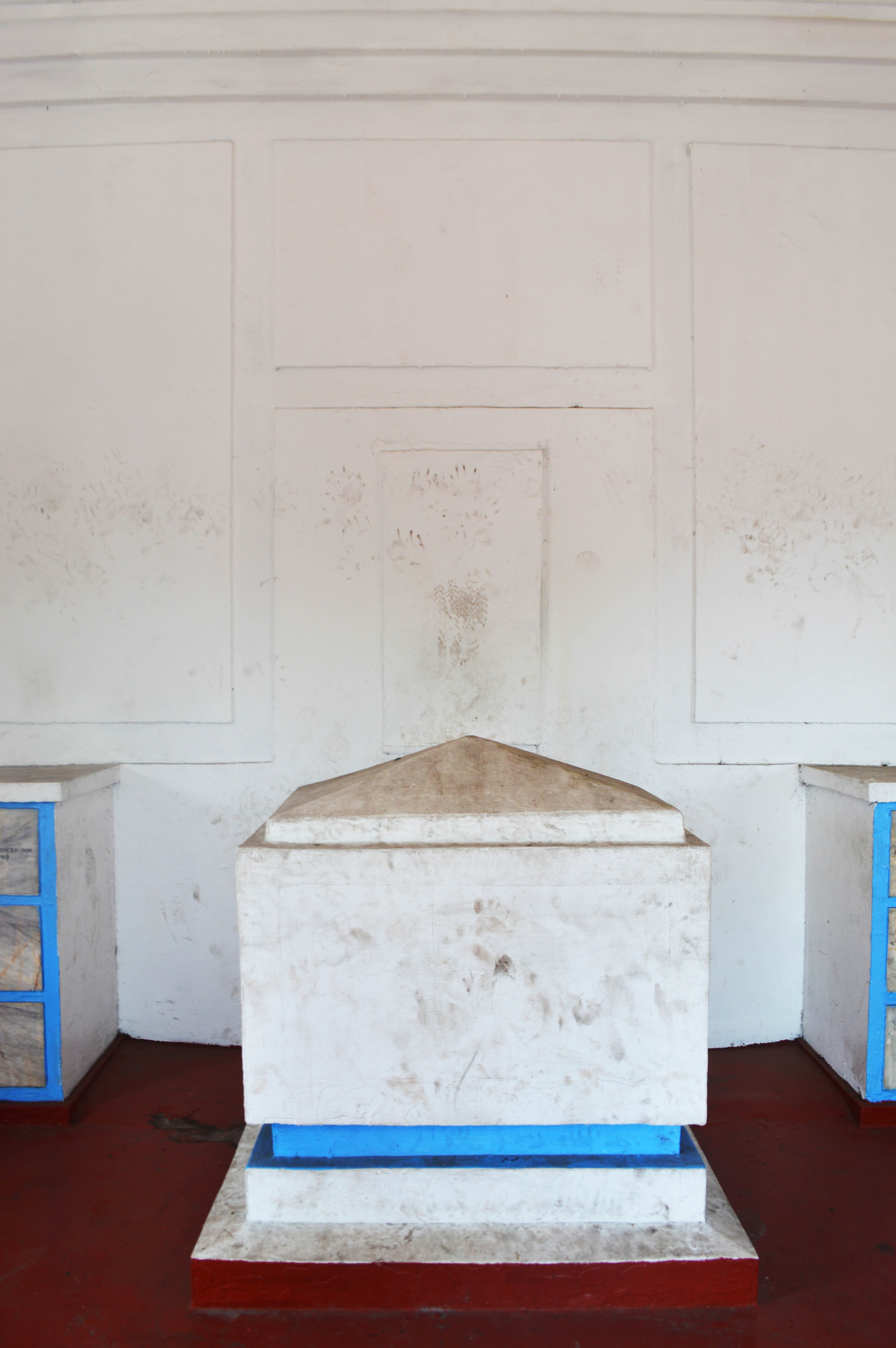
del Pilar's former tomb inside of the Mausoleo de los Veteranos de la Revolución at Manila North Cemetery

Del Pilar contracted tuberculosis in the spring of 1895. The following year, he decided to return to the Philippines to lead a revolution. His illness worsened that he had to cancel his journey. On June 20, 1896, he was taken to the Hospital de la Santa Cruz in Barcelona. Del Pilar died at 1:15 a.m. on July 4, 1896, over a month before the Cry of Pugad Lawin. According to Mariano Ponce's account of his death, his last words were: "Please tell my family that I was not able to say goodbye, but that I died with my true friends around me… Pray to God for the good fortune of our country. Continue with your work to attain the happiness and freedom of our beloved country." (Note: Fernando Canon also witnessed the last hours of Marcelo H. del Pilar.) He was buried the following day in a borrowed grave at the Cementerio del Sub-Oeste (Southwest Cemetery). Before dying, del Pilar retracted from Masonry and received the sacraments of the church.

== Reactions after death ==
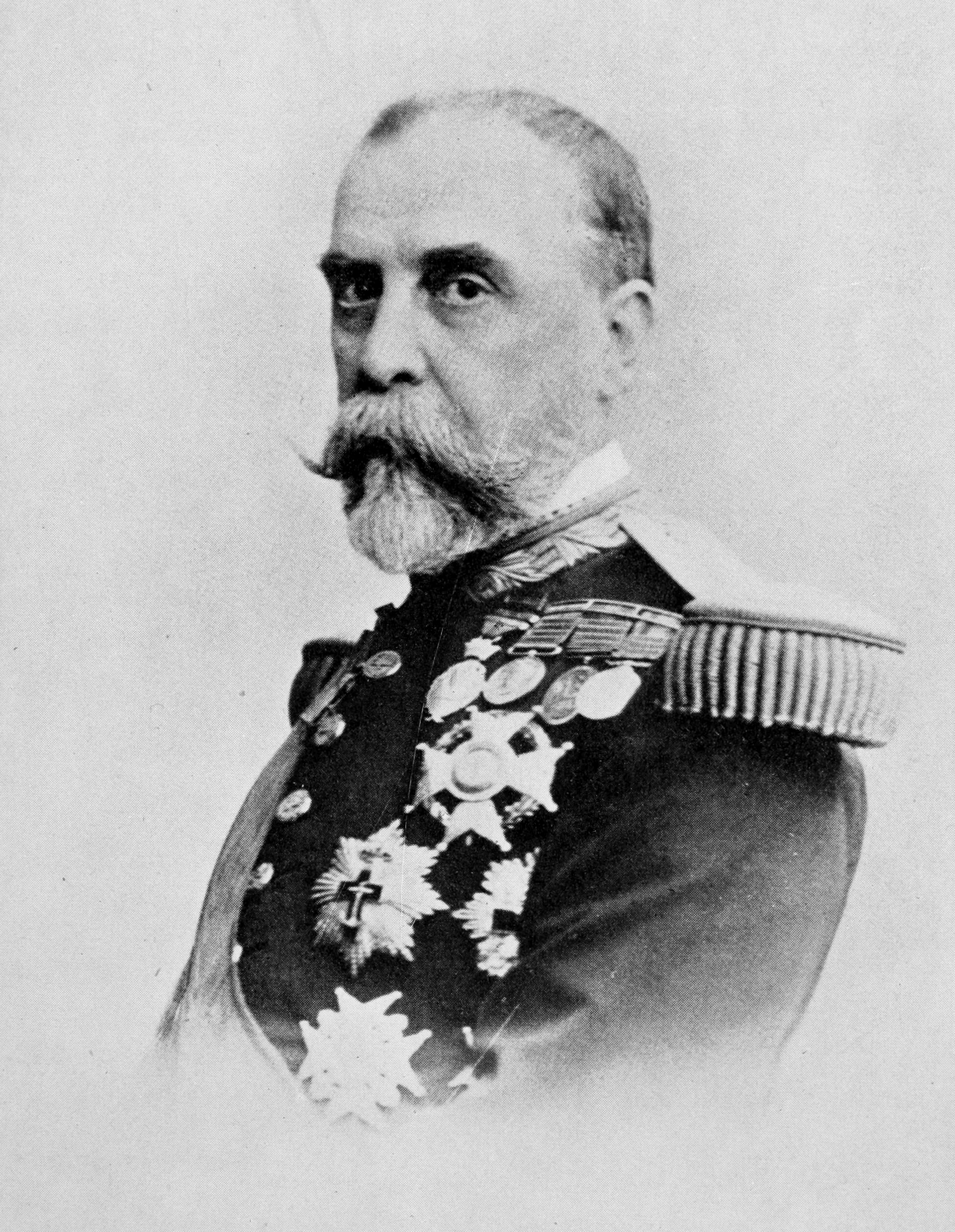
Governor-General Ramón Blanco y Erenas

- On July 15, 1896, La Politica de España en Filipinas paid tribute to del Pilar by calling him "the greatest journalist ever produced by the purely Filipino race."
- In 1897, former Governor-General Ramón Blanco declared del Pilar as "the most intelligent leader, the real soul of the separatists, very superior to Rizal." (Note: Como prueba de esta verdad, séame permitido copiar á continuación algunos párrafos de una carta que Marcelo H. del Pilar, el más inteligente, el verdadero verbo de los separatistas, muy superior á Rizal.)
- In La Independencia (1898), Mariano Ponce described del Pilar as "a tireless propagandist" whose powerful intelligence was respected "even by his enemies."

== Return of del Pilar's remains and final interment ==
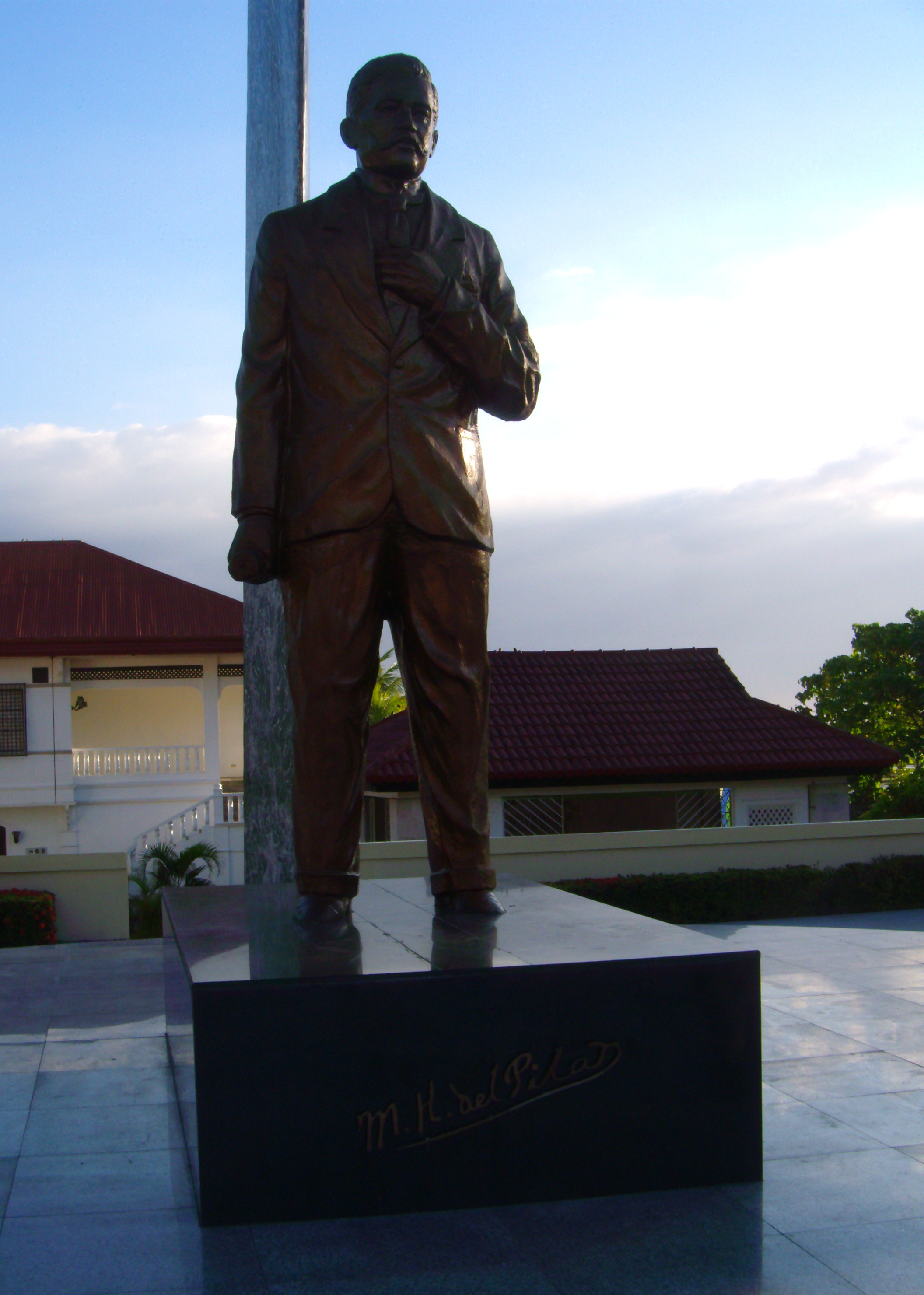
The National Shrine of Marcelo H. del Pilar in San Nicolás, Bulacán, Bulacan

In 1920, Norberto Romuáldez was commissioned to locate del Pilar's remains. With the help of Joaquín Pellicena y Camacho, the body was exhumed and placed in an urn. Alicante, the ship carrying del Pilar's remains, arrived in Manila on December 3, 1920. From Pier 3 the body was transferred to the Funeraria Nacional. It was taken to Malolos, Bulacan on December 6, 1920. The following day, it was transferred to del Pilar's birthplace in Bulakan, Bulacan. On December 11, 1920, the body lay in state at the Manila Grand Opera House. A necrological service was held at the Salon de Marmol on December 12, 1920. Filipino officials who attended the service were: Manuel C. Briones, representative from Cebu's 1st District; Rafael Palma, senator of the Philippines from the 4th Senatorial District; Teodoro M. Kalaw, secretary of the interior and local government; del Pilar's colleagues in Barcelona and Madrid, Trinidad Pardo de Tavera and Dominador Gómez; Victorino M. Mapa, 2nd Chief Justice of the Philippines; Manuel L. Quezon, senate president of the Philippines; and Sergio Osmeña, 1st Speaker of the Philippine House of Representatives. Del Pilar's wife and two daughters were present during the ceremony. After the service, del Pilar was interred at the Mousoleo de los Veteranos de la Revolución in the Manila North Cemetery.

Del Pilar's remains were transferred to his birthplace on August 30, 1984. His remains were laid to rest under his monument.

== Personal life ==
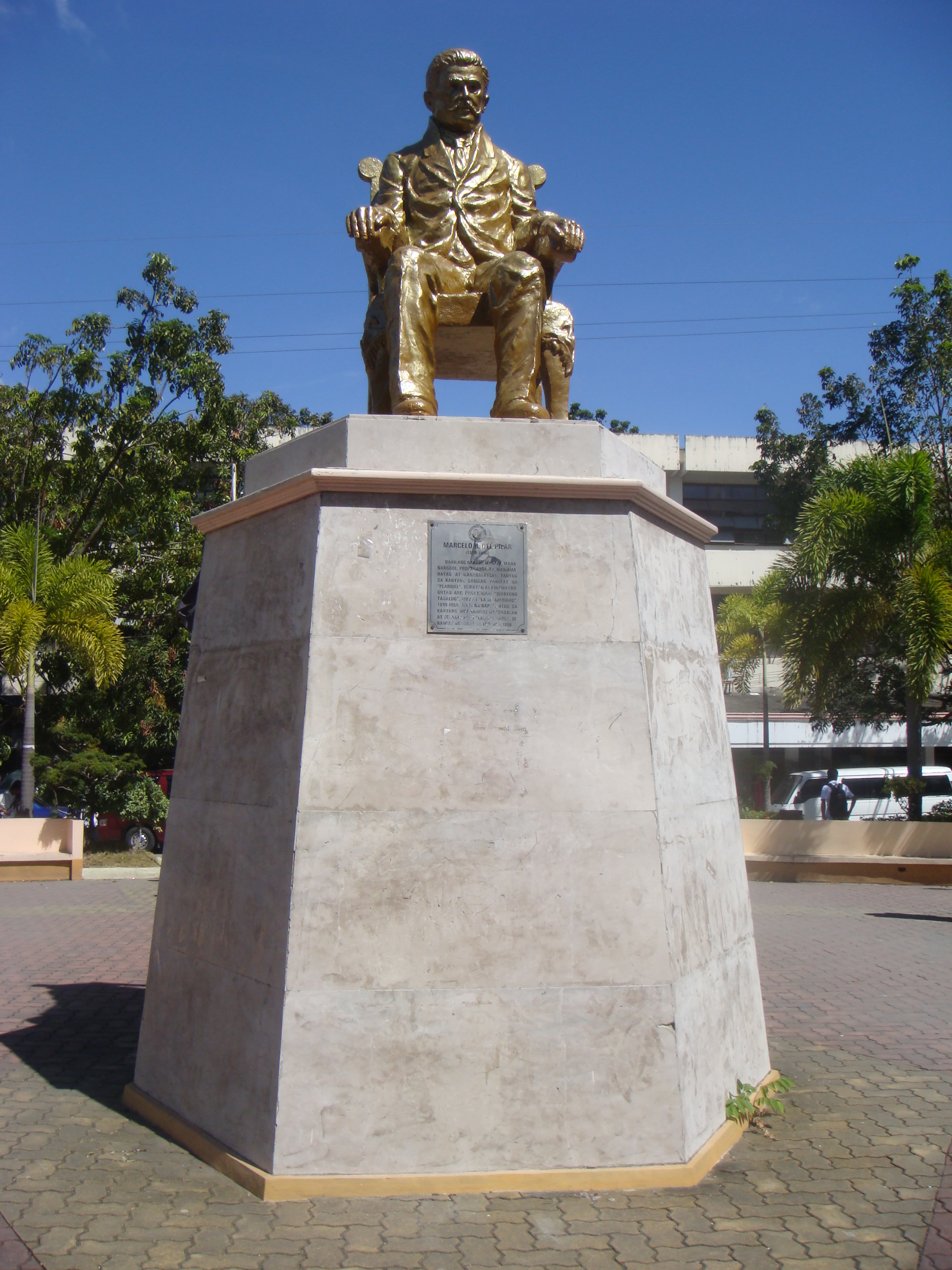
Marcelo H. del Pilar's monument in Bulacan's provincial heroes' park at Bulacan State University.

=== Marriage, children, and grandchildren ===
In February 1878, del Pilar married his second cousin Marciana (Chanay) in Tondo. The couple had seven children, five girls and two boys: Sofía, José, María Rosario, María Consolación, María Concepción, José Mariano Leon, and Ana (Anita). Sofía and Anita, the oldest and youngest child, survived to adulthood. On March 12, 1912, Anita married Vicente Marasigan Sr., a businessman from Taal, Batangas. She and her husband had six children: Benita, Vicente, Leticia, Josefina, Antonia, and Marcelo.

=== Hardships in Spain ===
Del Pilar's last years in Spain saw his descent into extreme poverty. In a letter to his wife Marciana on August 17, 1892, he wrote: "For my meals, I have to approach friends for loans, day after day. To be able to smoke, I have gone to the extreme of picking up cigarette butts in the streets." (Note: Anita, after hearing this news from her mother, immediately sent del Pilar her one peso Christmas gift.) In another letter to his wife on August 3, 1893, he told her about his frequent nightmares: "I always dream that I have Anita on my lap and Sofía by her side; that I kiss them by turns and that both tell me: 'Remain with us, papá, and don't return to Madrid'. I awake soaked in tears, and at this very moment that I write this, I cannot contain the tears that drop from my eyes." In June 1893, del Pilar's relatives were able to send money so that he could return to the Philippines. However, his friends (Regidor, Torres, Blumentritt, Morayta, and Quiroga) advised him to stay in Spain. In a letter to his wife on December 21, 1893, he said: "I am afraid of being too hasty, because in view of my present situation, a wrong step on my part will injure many persons, and even if I should pass out of this life, my compatriots would continue to accuse me of imprudence. Note that an error of Rizal's did harm to many (the 1887 Calamba trouble)."

=== Health ===
Del Pilar's health was declining before contracting tuberculosis in 1895. He suffered from insomnia, dengue, influenza, rheumatism, and a neck tumor.

== Connection with the Katipunan ==
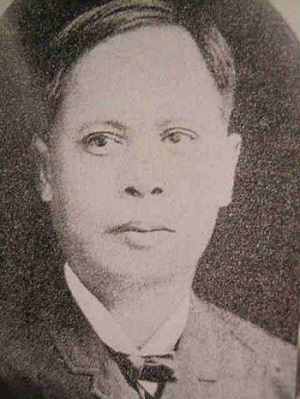
Deodato Arellano, del Pilar's brother-in-law, was the first president of the Katipunan.

The exact nature of del Pilar's involvement in the founding of the Katipunan remains a subject of historiographical debate. Some historians assert that del Pilar had a direct hand in the organization of the Katipunan due to his leadership in the Propaganda Movement and his eminent position in Philippine Masonry. Most of the Katipunan's founders and members were freemasons, (Note: Andrés Bonifacio was a member of the Logia Taliba No. 165. Sinukuan was his masonic name. Ladislao Diwa, Teodoro Plata, Valentín Díaz, and José Dizon were also members of the lodge.) (Note: Along with his brother-in-law del Pilar, Deodato Arellano was an active Freemason, hailing from Logia Lusong No. 185. Buan was his masonic name.) and the Katipunan featured initiation ceremonies and a hierarchical rank structure similar to those of freemasonry.

Early biographers, such as Rizal's Spanish biographer Wenceslao Retana and Filipino biographer Juan Raymundo Lumawag, argued that the formation of the Katipunan represented del Pilar's ideological victory over Rizal, stating:

"La Liga dies, and the Katipunan rises in its place. Del Pilar's plan wins over that of Rizal. Del Pilar and Rizal had the same end, even if each took a different road to it."

Writing for the Revista Filipina, historian Epifanio de los Santos posited that del Pilar validated the Katipunan's statutes. De los Santos stated:

"It is very correctly stated that Andrés Bonifacio ordered Teodoro Plata to draw up the statutes of the Katipunan, and that he did this with the aid of Ladislao Diwa and Valentín Díaz. After the statutes had been discussed, Bonifacio, with the concurrence of Deodato Arellano, submitted them to Marcelo H. del Pilar for approval. Upon the latter's letter approving the statutes, Bonifacio used the same for the purpose of gaining adepts."

Traditional accounts also claim that Bonifacio was guided by the letters of del Pilar, considering them as "sacred relics" of the revolution.

However, modern historical scholarship notes that no contemporary archival document has been found to prove that del Pilar had a direct hand in the organization of the Katipunan or the approval of its statutes. Critics of the theory attributing the society's creation to del Pilar argue that it relies heavily on retrospective accounts and diminishes the historical agency of Andrés Bonifacio.

=== Alleged testimonies of some Katipuneros ===
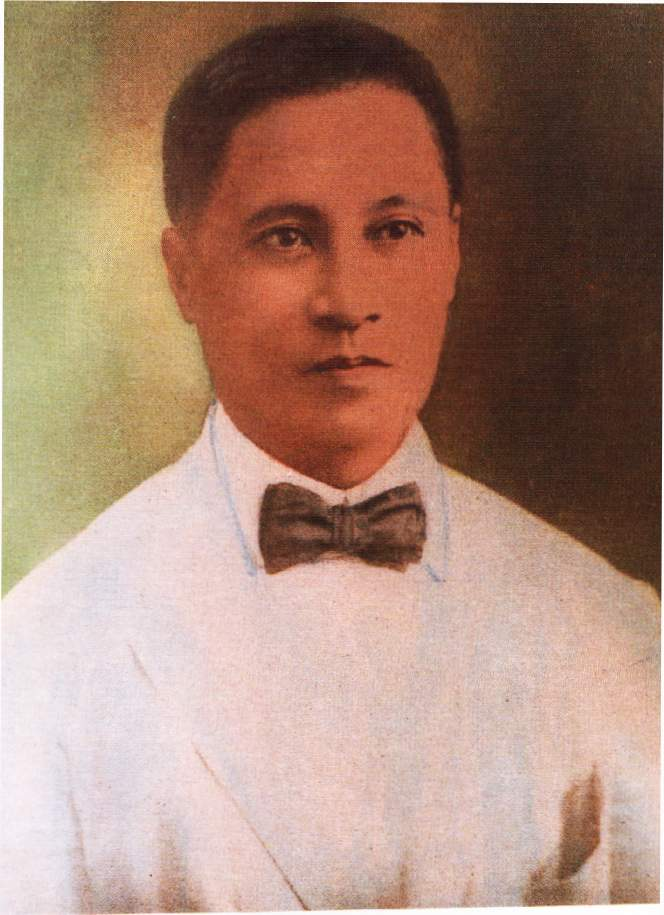
Pío Valenzuela y Alejandrino, a Filipino physician and member of the Katipunan

The theory of del Pilar's direct involvement relies largely on the testimonies and subsequent memoirs of arrested Katipunan members. Contemporary historians, such as Jim Richardson, (Note: Dr. Jim Richardson is a British historian and scholar. His well-known works include Roots of Dependency: Political and Economic Revolution in 19th Century Philippines (1979); Komunista: The Genesis of the Philippine Communist Party, 1902-1935 (2011); and The Light of Liberty: Documents and Studies on the Katipunan, 1892-1897 (2013).) have questioned the historical validity of these declarations, noting that testimonies extracted by Spanish authorities during the revolution were often coerced under interrogation.

==== Pío Valenzuela ====
On September 3, 1896, Pío Valenzuela stated to Spanish authorities that del Pilar had been the President of the Associates of the Katipunan living in Spain.

==== José Dizon ====
Following the discovery of the Katipunan, José Dizon was among the hundreds arrested for rebellion. During an interrogation by Spanish authorities on September 23, 1896, Dizon was asked who carried the instructions for the establishment of the Katipunan. He replied: "Moisés Salvador, he carried with him the instructions of Marcelo H. del Pilar from Madrid. Salvador forwarded the instructions to Deodato Arellano and Andrés Bonifacio."

==== Águedo del Rosario ====
On June 28, 1908, Águedo del Rosario wrote in a memoir that del Pilar had initiated the formation of the Katipunan while living in Barcelona.

== Historical remembrance ==
=== "Father of Philippine Journalism" ===
For his 150 essays and 66 editorials mostly published in La Solidaridad and various anti-friar pamphlets, del Pilar is widely regarded as the "Father of Philippine Journalism."

Samahang Plaridel, an organization of veteran journalists and communicators, was founded in October 2003 to honor del Pilar's ideals. It also promotes mutual help, cooperation, and understanding among Filipino journalists.

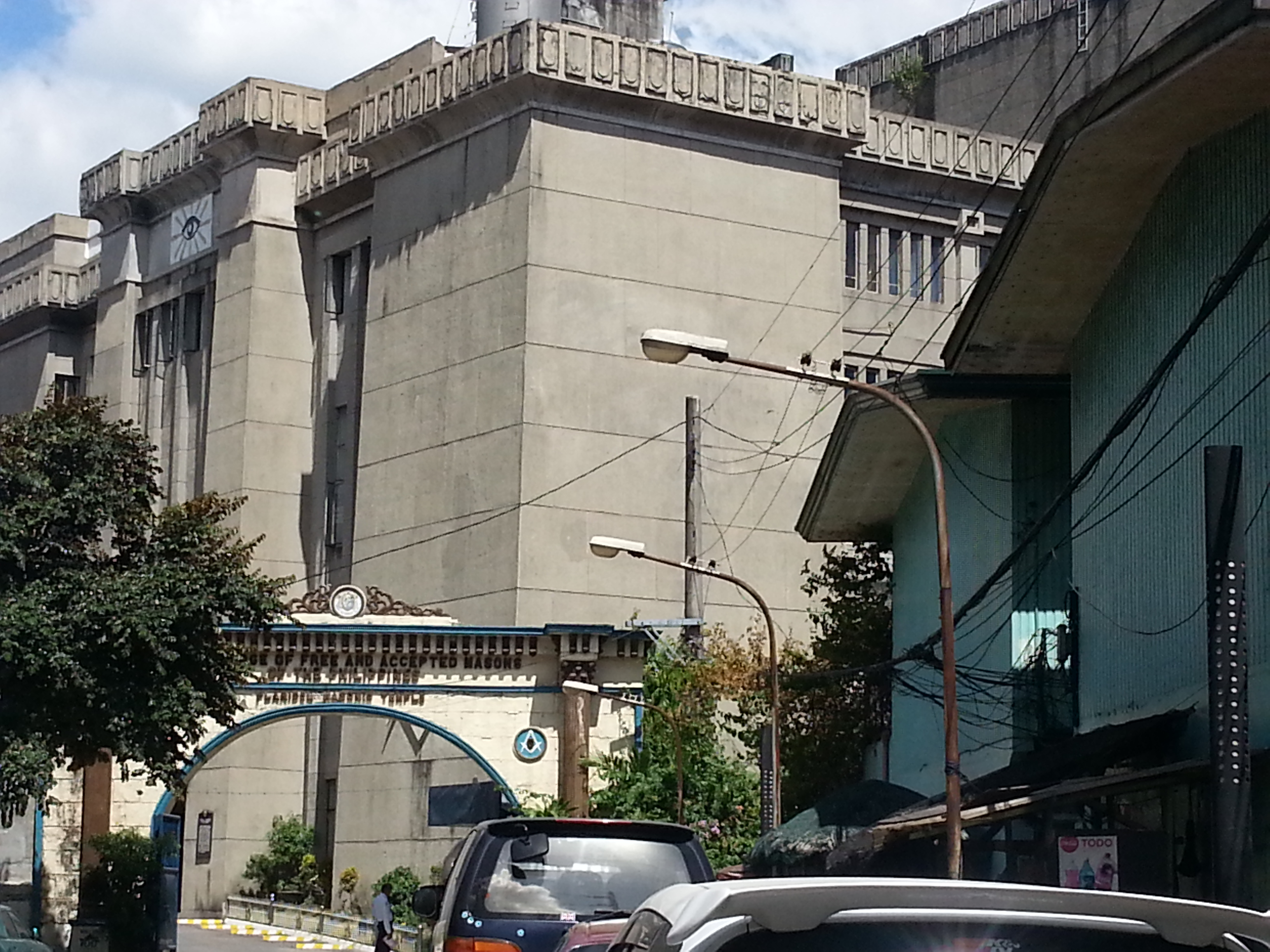
Plaridel Masonic Temple, the headquarters of the Most Worshipful Grand Lodge of Free and Accepted Masons of the Philippines.

=== "Father of Philippine Masonry" ===
Del Pilar was initiated into Freemasonry in 1889. He became an active member of the lodge Revolución in Barcelona. Other members of the lodge were Celso Mir Deas, Ponce, José María Panganiban, López Jaena, Justo Argudin, and Juan José Cañarte. On December 10, 1889, del Pilar joined the revived lodge Solidaridad No. 53 in Madrid. He became its second venerable master, replacing Julio A. Llorente.

Del Pilar worked for the establishment of Filipino Masonic lodges. In 1891, he sent Serrano y Lactao to the Philippines to establish Nilad, the first Filipino Masonic lodge. (Note: Other members of Nilad aside from Serrano y Lactao were José A. Ramos, Moisés Salvador, Lorenzo Tuason, Timoteo Paéz, Tomás Tuason, and José Kaknio.) In 1893, del Pilar also formed the Gran Consejo Regional de Filipinas, the first national organization of Filipino Masons. With these, he earned recognition as the "Father of Philippine Masonry."

The Masonic Grand Lodge of the Philippines, located at 1440 San Marcelino Street in Ermita, Manila, is named Plaridel Masonic Temple.

== Historical commemoration ==
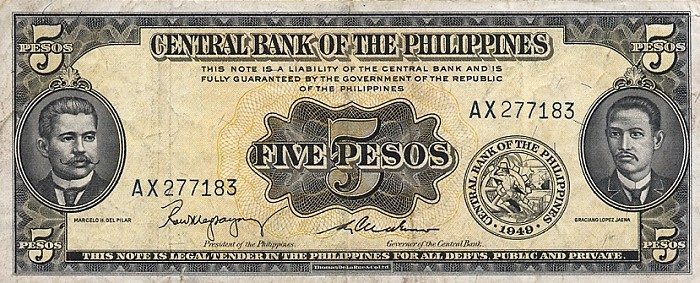
Del Pilar and López Jaena on the obverse side of a 5 peso Philippine banknote (1951-1974).

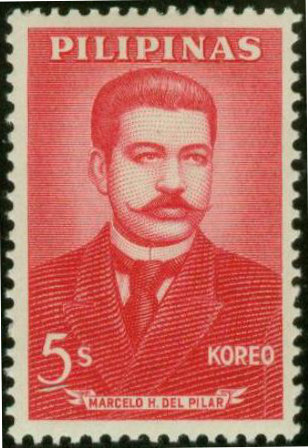
5 centavo postage stamp, issue of 1963

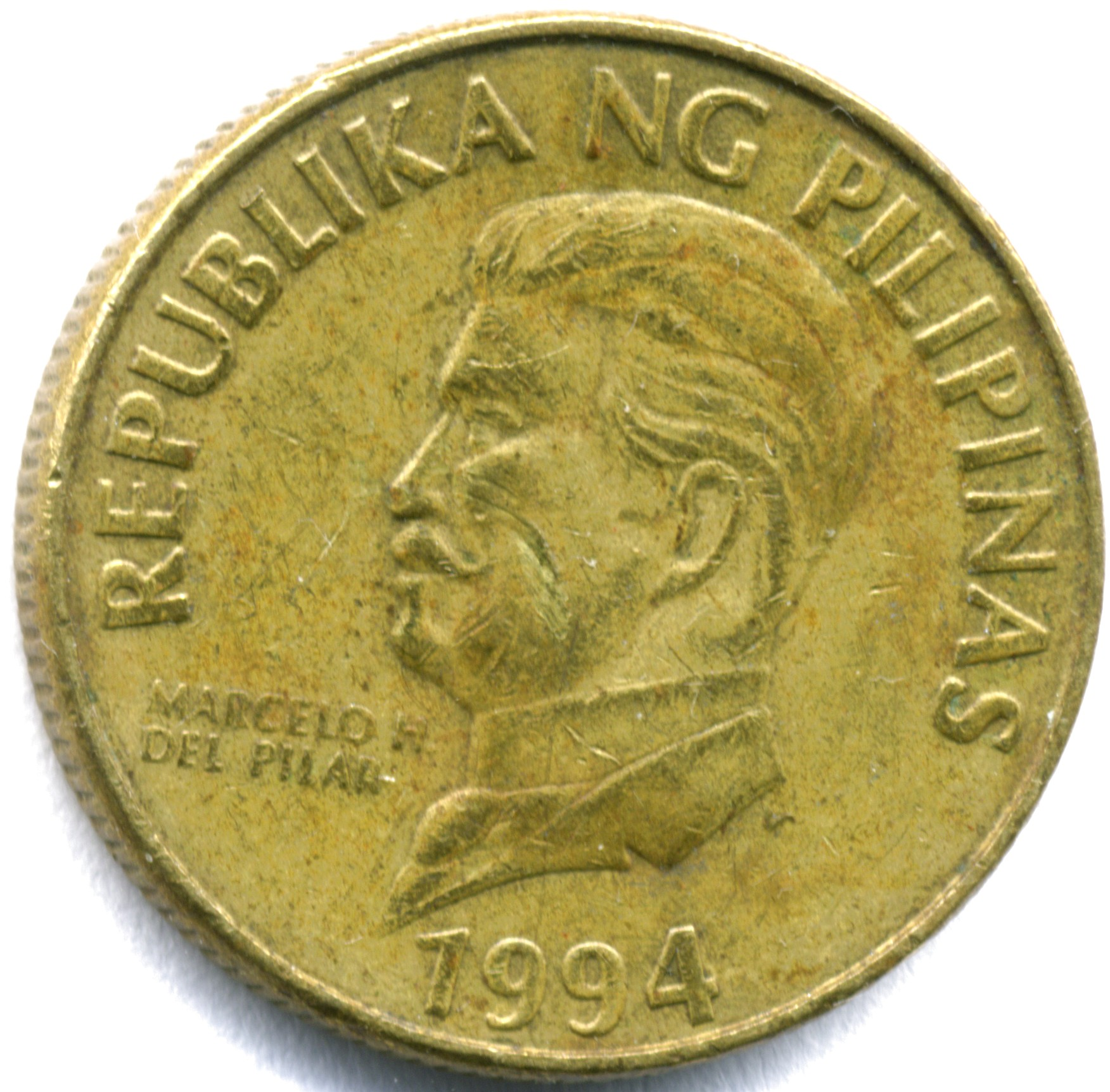
Del Pilar on the obverse of the Philippine fifty centavo coin (1994)

- The Marcelo H. del Pilar Shrine was erected in honor of del Pilar. At the center of the 4,027 square meter site is his 10 feet high monument, made by local sculptor Apolinario Bulaong. At the back of the stadium and the monument stands the mausoleum of the del Pilar family. A two-storey museum library constructed in 1998 can be found at the back of the site. Currently, the shrine is under the management of the National Historical Commission of the Philippines.
- Monuments erected in his honor can be found in Malolos, Paombong, Malate, and Parañaque.
- In 1969, a bronze bust of del Pilar was modelled by classical realist sculptor Anastacio Caedo.
- One of the Plaza Miranda's four corners, "Plaridel Corner", was named after del Pilar. The commemorative plaque, written in Filipino language, bears the following quotation attributed to Voltaire.
  Tutol ako sa sinabi mo, ngunit ipagtatanggol ko hanggang kamatayan ang karapatan mong sabihin iyon.
  (I disapprove of what you say, but I will defend to the death your right to say it.)
- Quingua, a 1st class municipality in the province of Bulacan, was renamed as "Plaridel" in honor of del Pilar.
- A 3rd class municipality in the province of Misamis Occidental was named "Plaridel" in honor of del Pilar.
- A 5th class municipality in the province of Quezon was named "Plaridel" in honor of del Pilar.
- A north–south street connecting Ermita and Malate districts is named Marcelo H. del Pilar Street. It was formerly known as Calle Real (Spanish for "royal street") which served as an arterial road that linked the southern provinces with Manila. In 1921, it was renamed after del Pilar.
- North Luzon Expressway (NLEX), an 84-kilometer (52 mi) limited-access toll expressway that links the provinces of Central Luzon to Metro Manila, was formerly known as the Marcelo H. del Pilar Superhighway.
- One of the streets in Silay City, Negros Occidental is named "Plaridel Street". The Angel Araneta Ledesma Ancestral House is located along the street.
- Marcelo H. del Pilar National High School, a secondary school located in Malolos, is named in honor of del Pilar.
- The building which houses the Graduate School in Polytechnic University of the Philippines was named after del Pilar.
- The building which houses the College of Mass Communication in UP Diliman is named Plaridel Hall in his memory.
- Del Pilar was the inspiration for the U.P. Gawad Plaridel awarded by the College of Mass Communication to outstanding Filipino media practitioners.
- Marcelo H. del Pilar was featured on the obverse of the Philippine fifty centavo coin in 1967–72 and again in 1983–94.
- Del Pilar and Graciano López Jaena appear on the obverse side of a five peso Philippine banknote circulated between 1951 and 1974.
- A 5 centavo postage stamp featuring del Pilar was released on March 3, 1952.
- On April 13, 2022, President Rodrigo Duterte signed Republic Act No. 11699, declaring del Pilar's birth date as National Press Freedom Day, a working holiday.

== Del Pilar in popular culture ==
- Portrayed by John Arcilla in the 1996 TV Series Bayani.
- Portrayed by Dennis Marasigan in the Filipino film José Rizal (1998).
- Portrayed by Mike Liwag in the TV series Ilustrado (2014).
- Del Pilar was featured in the Philippine television news magazine show iJuander.

== Notable works ==
=== Published during del Pilar's lifetime ===
- Ang Pagibig sa Tinubúang Lupà (Love for the Native Land, Tagalog translation of Rizal's El Amor Patrio published in the Diariong Tagalog, August 20, 1882)
- La Solídaridad (various articles and essays published under the pen names Pláridel, Carmelo, Patós, D.A. Murgas, and L.O. Crame)
- En Filipinas Quien Manda? (Who is the Master in the Philippines?, published in La Publicidad, December 23, 1887)
- El Monaquismo en Filipinas (Monasticism in the Philippines, published in El Diario under the pen name Piping Dilat, January 12, 1888)
- Viva España! Viva el Rey! Viva el Ejército! Fuera los Frailes! (Long live Spain! Long live the King! Long live the Army! Throw the friars out!, 1888)
- Caiigat Cayó (Be as Slippery as an Eel, published under the pen name Dolores Manapat, August 3, 1888)
- Ang Cadaquilaan nang Dios (The Greatness of God, 1888)
- Noli Me Tángere. Ante el Odio Monacal. (Noli Me Tangere. The Hatred of the Monks., published in La Publicidad under the pen name Pláridel, July 10, 11, 12 and 13, 1888)
- Filipinas Ante la Opinion (The Philippines and Public Opinion, published in El Diluvio, July 27, 1888)
- La Soberanía Monacal en Filipinas (Monastic Supremacy in the Philippines, published under the pen name MH. Pláridel, 1888)
- Dasalan at Tocsohan (Prayers and Mockeries, published under the pen name Dolores Manaksak, 1888)
- Pasióng Dapat Ipag-alab nang Puso nang Tauong Babasa sa Calupitán nang Fraile (The Passion that Should Inflame the Hearts of Those Who Read About the Cruelty of the Friars, 1888)
- Relegacion Gubernativa (Governmental Relegation, published in El Diluvio under the pen name Piping Dilat, January 24, 1889)
- La Asociación Hispano-Filipina (The Asociacion Hispano-Filipina, published in La Publicidad under the pen name Pláridel, January 30, 1889)
- La Frailocracía Filipina (Friarocracy in the Philippines, published under the pen name MH. Pláridel, 1889)
- Sagót nang España sa Hibíc nang Filipinas (Spain's Reply to the Cry of the Philippines, 1889)
- El Triunfo de la Remora en Filipinas (The Triumph of the Enemies of Progress in the Philippines, published in El País under the pen name Pláridel, February 28, 1890)
- Prologo (Prologue of Filipinas en las Cortes, 1890)
- Arancel de los Derechos Parroquiales en las Islas Filipinas publicado con su traduccion tagala (Tagalog translation of Arancel de los Derechos Parroquiales en las Islas Filipinas, 1890)
- Exposicion de la Asociación Hispano-Filipina (Memorial of the Asociacion Hispano-Filipina, February 1, 1892)
- Para Rectificar (A Correction, published in La Justicia, February 11, 1892)
- Otro Peligro Colonial (Another Colonial Danger, published in El Globo, January 19, 1895)
- Canal Bashi (The Bashi Channel, published in El Globo, January 26, 1896)
- Ministerio dela República Filipina (Ministry of the Philippine Republic, 1896)
- La Patria (The Fatherland, 1896)

=== Published posthumously ===
- Dupluhan... Dalits... Bugtongs (A Poetical Contest in Narrative Sequence, Psalms, Riddles, 1907)
- Pagina Especial Para la Mujer Filipina (Special Page for the Filipino Woman, published in El Renacimiento, August 28, 1909)

=== Unpublished works ===
- Sa Bumabasang Kababayan
- Discurso en El Meeting del Teatro Martin de Madrid (Speech at the Meeting in the Teatro Martin, Madrid)
- Esbozos de Un Codigo Internacional (Spanish translation of David Dudley Field's Outlines of an International Code)
- Proyecto de Estatutos de la Sociedad Financiera de Socorros Mutuos, Titulada la Paz (Proposed by-Laws of the Sociedad Financiera de Socorros Mutuos, Titulada la Paz)
- Reglas de Sintaxis Inglesa (Spanish translation of Rules of English Syntax)
- Progreso del Jefe Gomez: Rapida y Prontamente el Rebelde Principal Trastorna Todas las Combinaciones Españoles (The Progress of Chief Gomez: The Principal Rebel Leader Rapidly and Promptly Upsets All Spanish Combinations)

== See also ==
- Gawad Pláridel Award
- Katipunan
- La Solidaridad
- Philippine Revolution
- Propaganda Movement
