= Andrés Bonifacio =

Filipino revolutionary leader (1863–1897)

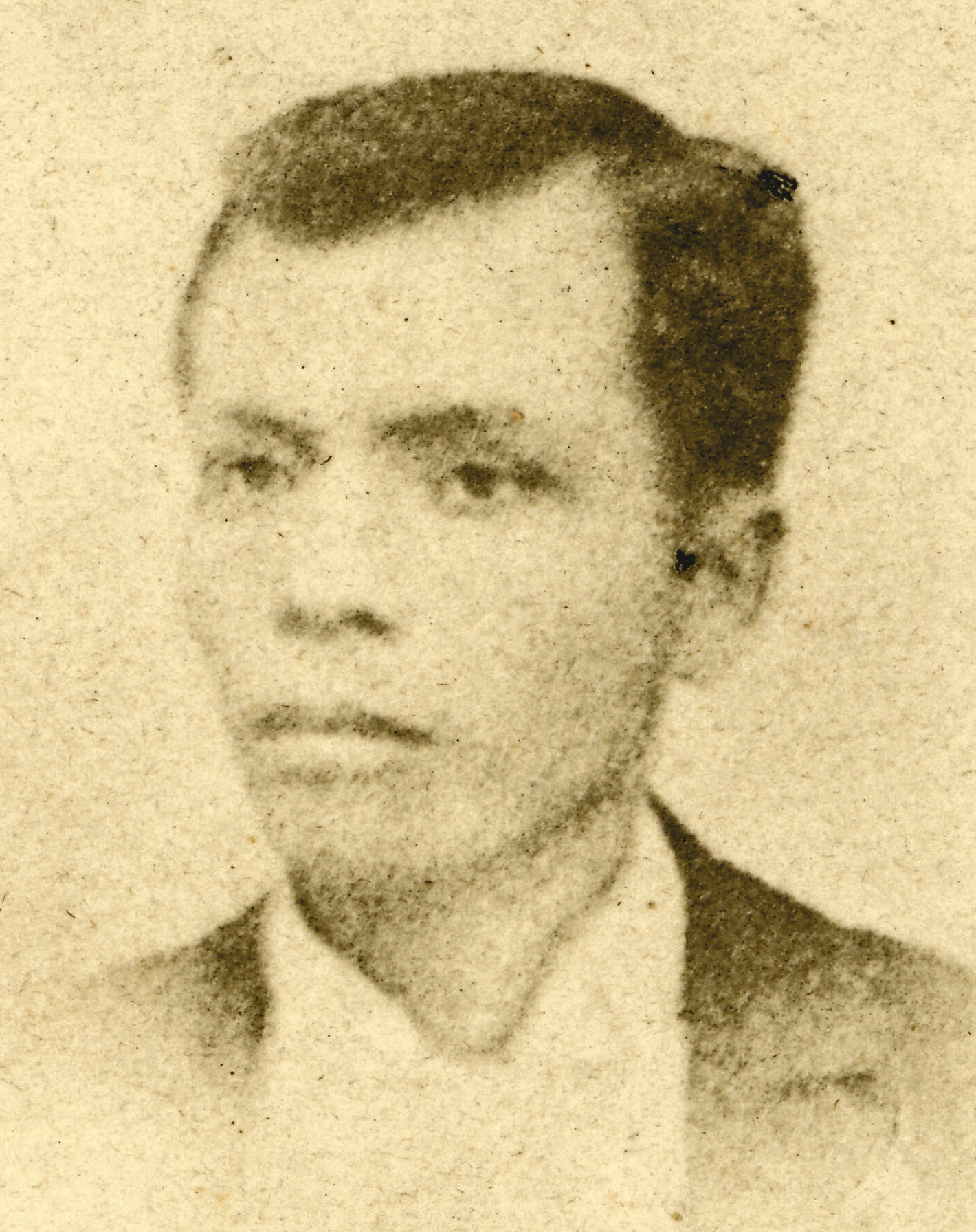
- The only extant portrait photograph of Bonifacio, c. 1896.

Unofficial President of the Sovereign Tagalog Nation President of the Philippines (unofficial)
- In office August 24, 1896 – March 22 or May 10, 1897
- Preceded by: Office established
- Succeeded by: Office abolished Emilio Aguinaldo (as President of Tejeros Revolutionary Government)

Supremo of Katipunan
- In office November 1895 – May 10, 1897
- Preceded by: Román Basa
- Succeeded by: Organization defunct

Personal details
- Born: Andrés Bonifacio y de Castro; November 30, 1863 Tondo, Manila, Captaincy General of the Philippines
- Died: May 10, 1897 (aged 33) Maragondon, Cavite, Captaincy General of the Philippines
- Cause of death: Execution
- Party: La Liga Filipina; Katipunan
- Spouses: Mónica (died) Gregoria de Jesús (m. 1893)
- Children: Andrés de Jesus Bonifacio, Jr. (1896) naming was not retroactively used during Spanish era
- Education: Self-educated
- Nickname(s): Maypagasa (The First President of the Republic of the Philippines )

Military service
- Allegiance: Katipunan; Tagalog Republic; Katipunan (Magdiwang)
- Years of service: 1896–1897
- Battles/wars: Philippine Revolution: Cry of Pugad Lawin; Battle of Manila (1896); Battle of San Juan del Monte; Battle of Pasong Tamo; Battle of San Mateo and Montalban; Battle of Marikina; Retreat to Balara

Andrés Bonifacio y de Castro (Tagalog: [anˈdɾes (anˈdɾez-) bonɪˈfaʃo], Spanish: [anˈdɾes βoniˈfaθjo]; (Note: In isolation, his given name and last name are pronounced [anˈdɾes] and [boniˈfaθjo] respectively. The Spanish pronunciation of Bonifacio in both Latin America and the United States is [boniˈfasjo].) November 30, 1863 – May 10, 1897) was a Filipino revolutionary leader. He is often called "The Father of the Philippine Revolution", considered a national hero of the Philippines.

He was a co-founder and later Kataastaasang Pangulo (Spanish: Presidente Supremo, “Supreme President”, often shortened by contemporaries and historians to Supremo) of the Kataastaasan, Kagalanggalang Katipunan ng mga Anak ng Bayan more commonly known as the "Katipunan", a movement that sought the independence of the Philippines from Spanish colonial rule and started the Revolution.

Bonifacio reorganized the Katipunan into a revolutionary government, with himself as Pangulo (President) of a nation-state called Haring Bayang Katagalugan (“Sovereign Nation of the Tagalog People” or “Sovereign Tagalog Nation”), also Republika ng Katagaluguan (Spanish: República Tagala, “Tagalog Republic”), wherein "Tagalog" referred to all those born in the Philippine Islands and not merely in Tagalog-speaking regions Hence, some historians have argued that he should be considered the First President of the Tagalogs instead of the Philippines; that is why he is not included in the official list of Presidents.

Bonifacio was executed in Maragondon by Major Lázaro Macapagal under orders of the Consejo de la Guerra (Council of War) led by General Mariano Noriel, on the basis of committing sedition and treason against the government. In retrospective decades, Bonifacio is now considered one of the greatest, most influential and prominent historical figures in the Philippines for his revolution.

== Early life and education ==
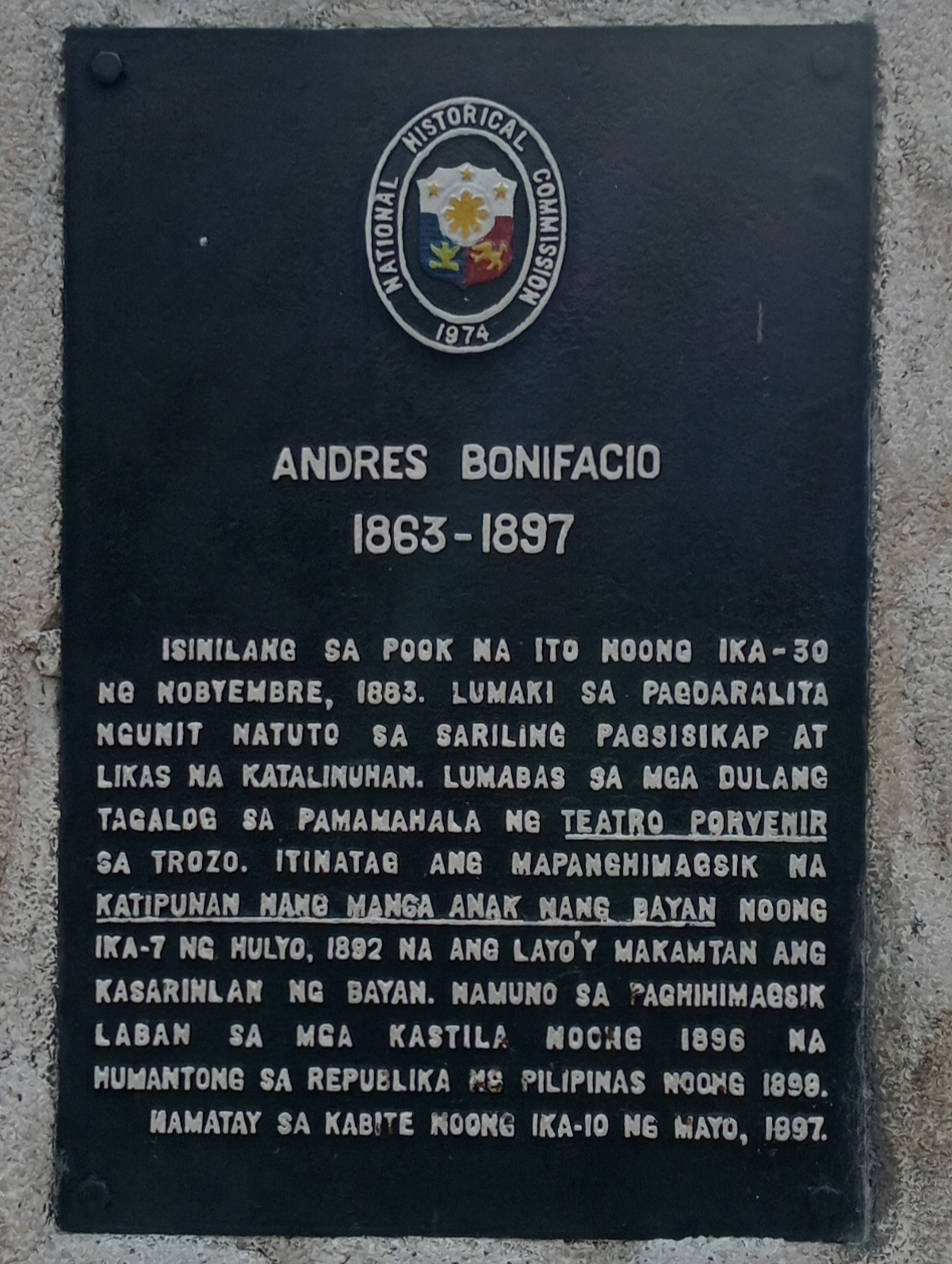
Historical marker written in Tagalog, installed in 1974 at his birthplace in Tondo, Manila, at the present-day Tutuban Center

Andrés Bonifacio was born on November 30, 1863, in Tondo, Manila, and was the first of six children of Catalina de Castro, a tornatrás from Zambales, and Santiago Bonifacio, a native of Taguig. His parents named him after Saint Andrew the Apostle, the patron saint of Manila on whose feast day he was born. He was baptized on December 3, 1863 by Fr. Saturnino Buntan, parish priest of Tondo Church. He learned the alphabet from his aunt. He was enrolled in Guillermo Osmeña's private elementary school and also in Escuela Municipal de Niños on Calle Ilaya in Tondo. He reached the third year in a private secondary school in Manila.

Some sources assert that he was orphaned at an early age, but the existence of an 1881 record that has Bonifacio's parents listed as living in Tondo leaves this disputed. To support his family financially, Bonifacio made walking canes and paper fans, which he and his young siblings sold (after they were orphaned, according to the traditional view). He also made posters for business firms, and this became their thriving family business that continued when Andrés and his brothers Ciriaco, Procopio, and Troadio, were employed with private and government companies, which provided them with decent living conditions.

In his late teens, he first worked either as an agent or mandatario (messenger) for the British trading firm Fleming and Company, where he rose to become a corredor (broker) of tar, rattan and other goods. He later transferred to the German trading firm Fressell and Company, where he worked as a bodeguero (storehouse keeper) responsible for warehouse inventory. He was also a theater actor and often played the role of Bernardo Carpio, a fictional hero in Tagalog folklore.

Not finishing his formal education, Bonifacio turned to self-education by reading books. He read books about the French Revolution, biographies of the presidents of the United States, books about contemporary Philippine penal and civil codes, and novels such as Victor Hugo's Les Misérables, Eugène Sue's Le Juif errant and José Rizal's Noli Me Tángere and El filibusterismo. Aside from Tagalog and Spanish, he spoke some English due to his work with Fleming and Company.

== Marriages ==
Bonifacio's first wife, Mónica (surname unknown), was his neighbor in Palomar, Tondo. She died of leprosy and they had no recorded children.

In 1892, Bonifacio, then a 29-year-old widower, met the 18-year-old Gregoria de Jesús through his friend Teodoro Plata, who was her cousin. Gregoria, nicknamed “Oriang”, was the daughter of a prominent citizen and landowner from Caloocan. Her parents initially disapproved of their relationship for Bonifacio was a Freemason, the movement being at odds with the Catholic Church. They eventually acquiesced, and Andrés and Gregoria were married in a Catholic ceremony at Binondo Church in March 1893 or 1894. The couple were married later that day in separate Katipunan rites at a friend's house in Santa Cruz, Manila.

They had one son, Andrés, in early 1896 who died of smallpox in his infancy.

== Early political activism ==
In 1892, Bonifacio became one of the founding members of José Rizal's La Liga Filipina, an organization that called for political reforms in Spain's colonial government of the Philippines. However, La Liga disbanded after only one meeting, for Rizal was arrested and deported to Dapitan in the Zamboanga Peninsula region. Bonifacio, Apolinario Mabini, and others revived La Liga in Rizal's absence and Bonifacio was active at organizing local chapters in Manila. He would become the chief propagandist of the revived La Liga.

La Liga Filipina contributed moral and financial support to the Propaganda Movement of Filipino reformists in Spain.

== Katipunan ==
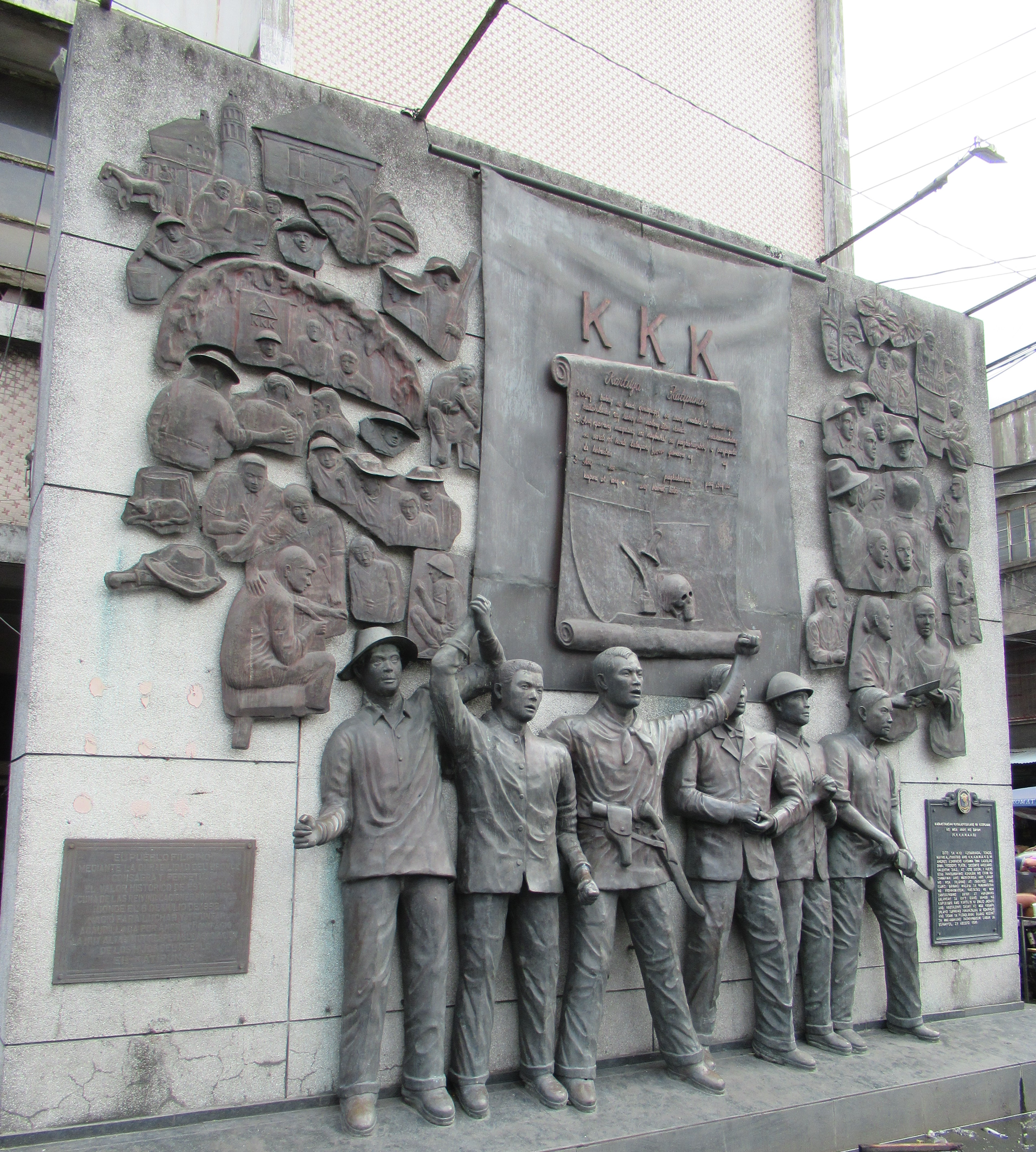
Katipunan Monument along Recto Avenue (formerly Calle Azcarraga) in San Nicolas, Manila, where Katipunan was founded

On the night of July 7, 1892, the day after Rizal's deportation was announced, Bonifacio and others officially "founded" the Katipunan, or in full, Kataas-taasan, Kagalang-galang na Katipunan ng mga Anak ng Bayan ("Highest and Most Respected Society of the Country's Children"; Bayan can also denote community, people, and nation). The secret society sought independence from Spain through armed revolt. It was influenced by Freemasonry through its rituals and organization, and several members including Bonifacio were also Freemasons. Within the society Bonifacio used the pseudonym May pag-asa (lit. transl. "There is Hope"). Recently discovered documents, however, suggest that Katipunan had already been in existence since at least January 1892.

For a time, Bonifacio worked with both the Katipunan and La Liga Filipina. La Liga eventually split because some members like Bonifacio lost hope for peaceful reform and stopped their monetary aid. The more conservative members, mostly wealthy members, who still believed in peaceful reforms set up the Cuerpo de Compromisarios, which pledged continued support to the reformists in Spain. The radicals were subsumed into the Katipunan. From Manila, the Katipunan expanded to several provinces, including Batangas, La Laguna (present-day Laguna), Cavite, Bulacan, Pampanga, and Nueva Ecija. Most of its members, called Katipuneros, came from the lower and middle classes, and many of its local leaders were prominent figures in their municipalities. Initially exclusively male, membership was later extended to females, with Bonifacio's wife Gregoria de Jesús as a leading member.

From the beginning, Bonifacio was one of the chief Katipunan officers, although he did not become its Presidente Supremo (Supreme President) until 1895. He was the third head of the Katipunan after Deodato Arellano and Román Basa. Prior to this, he served as the society's comptroller and then as its fiscal (advocate/procurator). The Katipunan had its own laws, bureaucratic structure and elective leadership. For each province involved, the Katipunan Supreme Council coordinated with provincial councils in charge of public administration and military affairs, and with local councils in charge of affairs on the district or barrio level.

Within the society, Bonifacio developed a strong friendship with Emilio Jacinto, who served as his adviser and confidant, as well as a member of the Supreme Council. Bonifacio adopted Jacinto's Kartilya primer as the official teachings of the society in place of his own Decalogue, which he judged as inferior. Bonifacio, Jacinto and Pío Valenzuela collaborated on the society's organ, Kalayaan (Freedom), which had only one printed issue. Bonifacio wrote several pieces for the paper, including the poem Pag-ibig sa Tinubúang Lupà (approx. "Love for One's Homeland") under the pseudonym Agapito Bagumbayan. The publication of Kalayaan in March 1896 led to a great increase in the society's membership. The Katipunan movement spread throughout Luzon, to Panay in the Visayas and even as far as Mindanao. From less than 300 members in January 1896, it had 30,000 to 40,000 by August 1896.

The rapid increase in Katipunan activity drew the suspicion of the Spanish authorities. By early 1896, Spanish intelligence was aware of the existence of a seditious secret society, and suspects were kept under surveillance and arrests were made. On May 3, Bonifacio held a general assembly of Katipunan leaders in Pasig, where they debated when to start the revolution. While some officers, especially Bonifacio, believed revolution was inevitable, others members especially Santiago Álvarez and Emilio Aguinaldo (both of Cavite) expressed reservations and disagreement regarding the planned revolt due to a lack of firearms. The consensus was to consult José Rizal in Dapitan before launching armed action, so Bonifacio sent Pío Valenzuela to Rizal. Rizal opposed armed revolt, believing it to be premature, and he recommended more preparation; he further suggested should there be revolution that they seek the leadership of Antonio Luna, widely regarded as a brilliant military leader.

== Philippine Revolution ==
=== Start of the uprising ===
Spanish authorities confirmed the existence of the Katipunan on August 19, 1896. Hundreds of Filipino suspects, both innocent and guilty, were arrested and imprisoned for treason. José Rizal (José Protasio Rizal Mercado y Realonda) was then on his way to Cuba to serve as a doctor in the Spanish colonial army in exchange for his release from Dapitan. When the news broke, Bonifacio first tried to convince Rizal, quarantined aboard a ship in Manila Bay, to escape and join the imminent revolt. Bonifacio, Emilio Jacinto and Guillermo Masangkay disguised themselves as sailors and went to the pier where Rizal's ship was anchored. Jacinto personally met with Rizal, who rejected their rescue offer. Rizal himself was later arrested, tried and executed on December 30.

Bonifacio's personal flag

Eluding an intensive manhunt, Bonifacio called thousands of Katipunan members to a mass gathering in Caloocan, where they decided to start their uprising. The event, marked by the tearing of cédulas (personal identity documents) was later called the "Cry of Balintawak" or "Cry of Pugad Lawin"; the exact location and date of the Cry are disputed. The Supreme Council of the Katipunan declared a nationwide armed revolution against Spain and called for a simultaneous coordinated attack on the capital Manila on August 29. Bonifacio appointed generals to lead rebel forces to Manila. Other Katipunan councils were also informed of their plans. Before hostilities erupted, Bonifacio reorganized the Katipunan into an open, de facto revolutionary government with himself as Supremo of the rebel army and the Supreme Council as his cabinet. On August 28, Bonifacio issued the following general proclamation:

This manifesto is for all of you. It is absolutely necessary for us to stop at the earliest possible time the nameless oppositions being perpetrated on the sons of the country who are now suffering the brutal punishment and tortures in jails, and because of this, please, let all the brethren know that on Saturday, the 29th of the current month, the revolution shall commence according to our agreement. For this purpose, it is necessary for all towns to rise simultaneously and attack Manila at the same time. Anybody who obstructs this sacred ideal of the people will be considered a traitor and an enemy, except if he is ill; or is not physically fit, in which case he shall be tried according to the regulations we have put in force. Mount of Liberty, 28 August 1896 – ANDRÉS BONIFACIO

On August 30, 1896, Bonifacio personally led an attack on San Juan del Monte (now San Juan City) to capture the town's powder magazine and water reservoir which supplied Manila. The defending Spaniards, outnumbered, fought a delaying battle until reinforcements arrived. Once reinforced, the Spaniards drove Bonifacio's forces back with heavy casualties. Bonifacio and his troops regrouped near Mariquina (now Marikina), San Mateo and Montalban (now Rodríguez). Elsewhere, fighting between rebels and Spanish forces occurred in San Felipe Neri (now Mandaluyong), Sampaloc, Santa Ana, Pandacan, Pateros, Mariquina, Caloocan, San Pedro Macati (now Makati) and Taguig. The conventional view among Filipino historians is that the planned general Katipunan offensive on Manila was aborted in favor of Bonifacio's attack on San Juan del Monte, which sparked a general state of rebellion in the area. However, more recent studies have advanced the view that the planned offensive did push through and the rebel attacks were integrated; according to this view, Bonifacio's San Juan del Monte battle was only a part of a bigger, unrecognized "Battle for Manila". Despite his reverses, Bonifacio was not completely defeated and still considered a threat, with the revolt having spread to surrounding provinces by the end of August.

=== Haring Bayang Katagalugan ===
Influenced by Freemasonry, the Katipunan had been organized with "its own laws, bureaucratic structure and elective leadership". For each province it involved, the Supreme Council coordinated provincial councils which were in charge of "public administration and military affairs on the supra-municipal or quasi-provincial level" and local councils, in charge of affairs "on the district or barrio level". In the last days of August, the Katipunan members met in Caloocan and decided to start their revolt (the event was later called the "Cry of Balintawak" or "Cry of Pugad Lawin"; the exact location and date are disputed). A day after the Cry, the Supreme Council was reorganized by Bonifacio with the following:

Position	Name
Supreme President ( Kataas-taasang Pangulo, Presidente Supremo)	Andres C. Bonifacio
Secretary of War	Teodoro Plata
Secretary of State	Emilio Jacinto
Secretary of the Interior	Aguedo del Rosario
Secretary of Justice	Briccio Pantas
Secretary of Finance	Enrique Pacheco

The above was divulged to the Spanish by the Katipunan member Pío Valenzuela while in captivity. Teodoro Agoncillo thus wrote:

Immediately before the outbreak of the revolution, therefore, Bonifacio organized the Katipunan into a government revolving around a ‘cabinet’ composed of men of his confidence.

Milagros C. Guerrero and others have described Bonifacio as "effectively" the commander-in-chief of the revolutionaries. They assert:

As commander-in-chief, Bonifacio supervised the planning of military strategies and the preparation of orders, manifests and decrees, adjudicated offenses against the nation, as well as mediated in political disputes. He directed generals and positioned troops in the fronts. On the basis of command responsibility, all victories and defeats all over the archipelago during his term of office should be attributed to Bonifacio.

One name for Bonifacio's concept of the Philippine nation-state appears in surviving Katipunan documents: Haring Bayang Katagalugan ("Sovereign Nation of Katagalugan", or "Sovereign Tagalog Nation") – sometimes shortened into Haring Bayan ("Sovereign Nation"); Bayan glossed either as "nation" or "people". Bonifacio is named as the president of the "Tagalog Republic" in an issue of the Spanish periodical La Ilustración Española y Americana published in February 1897 ("Andrés Bonifacio – Titulado "Presidente" de la República Tagala"). Another name for Bonifacio's government was Repúblika ng Katagalugan (another form of "Tagalog Republic") as evidenced by a rebel seal published in the same periodical the next month.

Official letters and one appointment paper of Bonifacio addressed to Emilio Jacinto reveal Bonifacio's various titles and designations, as follows:

- President of the Supreme Council
- Supreme President
- President of the Sovereign Nation of Katagalugan / Sovereign Tagalog Nation
- President of the Sovereign Nation, Founder of the Katipunan, Initiator of the Revolution
- Office of the Supreme President, Government of the Revolution

Later, in November 1896, while encamped at Balara, Bonifacio commissioned Julio Nakpil to compose a national anthem. Nakpil produced a hymn called Marangál na Dalit ng Katagalugan ("Honorable Hymn of the Tagalog Nation/People").

Eventually, an 1897 power struggle in Cavite led to command of the revolution shifting to Emilio Aguinaldo at the Tejeros Convention, where a new government was formed. Bonifacio was executed after he refused to recognize the new government. The Aguinaldo-led Philippine Republic (Spanish: República Filipina), often labelled the "First Philippine Republic", was formally established in 1899, after a succession of revolutionary and dictatorial governments (e.g. the Tejeros government, the Biak-na-Bato Republic) also headed by Aguinaldo.

=== Campaigns around Manila ===
By December 1896, the Spanish government recognized three major centers of rebellion: Cavite (under Mariano Álvarez, Emilio Aguinaldo and others), Bulacan (under Mariano Llanera) and Morong (under Bonifacio). The revolt was most successful in Cavite, which mostly fell under rebel control by September and October 1896.

While Cavite is traditionally regarded as the "Heartland of the Philippine Revolution", Manila and its surrounding municipalities bore the brunt of the Spanish military campaign, becoming a no man's land. Rebels in the area were generally engaged in hit-and-run guerrilla warfare against Spanish positions in Manila, Morong, Nueva Ecija and Pampanga. From Morong, Bonifacio served as tactician for rebel guerrillas and issued commands to areas other than his personal sector, though his reputation suffered when he lost battles he personally led.

From September to October 1896, Bonifacio supervised the establishment of Katipunan mountain and hill bases like Balara in Mariquina, Pantayanin in Antipolo, Ugong in Pasig and Tungko in Bulacan. Bonifacio appointing generals for these areas, or approving selections the troops themselves made.

On November 7, 1896, Bonifacio led an assault on San Mateo, Mariquina and Montalban. The Spanish were forced to retreat, leaving these areas to the rebels, except for the municipal hall of San Mateo where some Spanish troops had barricaded. While Bonifacio's troops laid siege to the hall, other Katipunan forces set up defensive lines along the nearby Langka (or Nangka) River against Spanish reinforcements coming from the direction of Mariquina. After three days, Spanish counterattacks broke through the Nangka River lines. The Spanish troops thus recaptured the rebel positions and surprised Bonifacio in San Mateo, who ordered a general retreat to Balara. They were pursued, and Bonifacio was nearly killed shielding Emilio Jacinto from a Spanish bullet which grazed his collar.

=== Bonifacio in Cavite ===
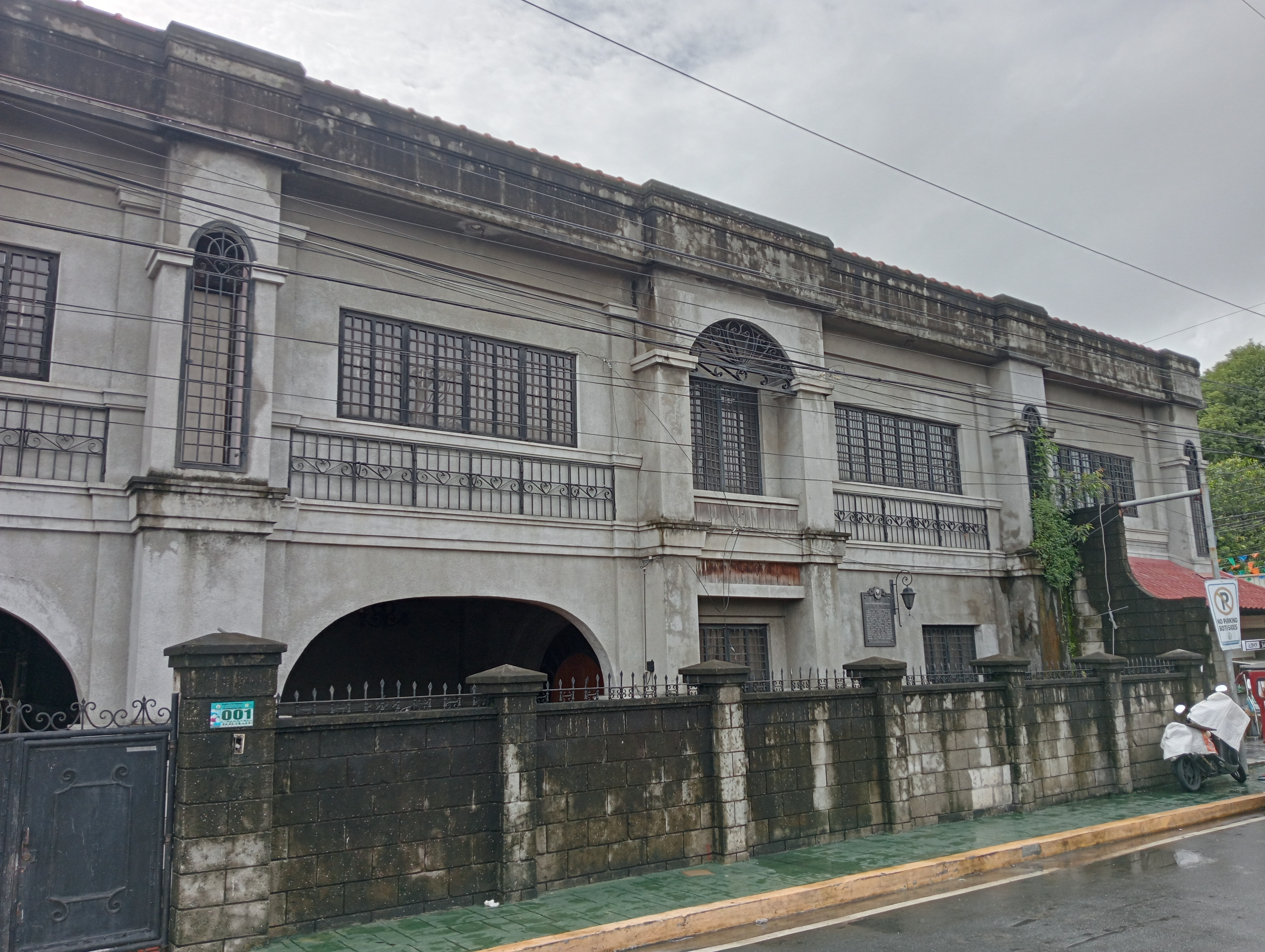
House in present-day General Trias where Bonifacio and his brothers temporarily stayed

In late 1896, Bonifacio, as the recognized overall leader of the revolution, was invited to Cavite province by rebel leaders to mediate between them and unify their efforts. There were two Katipunan provincial chapters in Cavite that became rival factions: the Magdalo, headed by Emilio Aguinaldo's cousin Baldomero Aguinaldo, and the Magdiwang, headed by Mariano Álvarez, the uncle of Bonifacio's wife Gregoria. Leaders of both factions came from the upper class, in contrast to Bonifacio, who came from the lower-middle class. After initial successes, Emilio Aguinaldo issued a manifesto in the name of the Magdalo ruling council which proclaimed a provisional and revolutionary government – despite the existence of the Katipunan government. Emilio Aguinaldo in particular had won fame for victories in the province. The Magdalo and Magdiwang clashed over authority and jurisdiction and did not help each other in battle. After multiple letters were sent to Bonifacio urging him to come, in December 1896 he traveled to Cavite accompanied by his wife, his brothers Procopio and Ciriaco, and some troops, including Emilio Jacinto, Bonifacio's secretary and right-hand man. Jacinto was said to be against Bonifacio's expedition to Cavite. The Bonifacio brothers stayed in San Francisco de Malabón (present-day General Trias) during this time.

Upon his arrival at Cavite, friction grew between Bonifacio and the Magdalo leaders. Apolinario Mabini, who later served as Emilio Aguinaldo's adviser, writes that at this point the Magdalo leaders "already paid little heed to his authority and orders." Bonifacio was partial to the Magdiwang, perhaps due to his kinship ties with Mariano Álvarez, or more importantly, due to their stronger recognition of his authority. When Aguinaldo and Edilberto Evangelista went to receive Bonifacio at Zapote, they were irritated with what they regarded as his attitude of superiority. In his memoirs, Aguinaldo wrote that Bonifacio acted "as if he were a king". Another time, Bonifacio ordered the arrest of Katipunan general Vicente Fernández from La Laguna, who was escorting Magdalo leaders paying their respects to Bonifacio, for failing to support his attack in Manila, but the other Magdalo leaders refused to surrender him. Townspeople in Noveleta (a Magdiwang town) acclaimed Bonifacio as the ruler of the Philippines, to the chagrin of the Magdalo leaders, with Bonifacio replying: "Long live Philippine liberty!". Aguinaldo disputed with Bonifacio over strategic troop placements and blamed him for the capture of the town of Silang. The Spanish, through Jesuit Superior Pío Pi, wrote to Aguinaldo about the possibility of peace negotiations. When Bonifacio found out, he and the Magdiwang council rejected the proposed peace talks. Bonifacio was also angered that the Spanish considered Aguinaldo the "chief of the rebellion" instead of him. However, Aguinaldo continued to arrange negotiations which never took place. Bonifacio believed Aguinaldo was willing to surrender the revolution.

Bonifacio was also subject to rumors that he had stolen Katipunan funds, his sister was the mistress of a priest, and he was an agent provocateur paid by friars to foment unrest. Also circulated were anonymous letters which told the people of Cavite not to idolize Bonifacio because he was a Freemason, a mere Manila employee, allegedly an atheist, and uneducated. According to these letters, Bonifacio did not deserve the title of Supremo since God alone was supreme. This last allegation was made despite the fact that Supremo was meant to be used in conjunction with Presidente, i.e. Presidente Supremo (Supreme President, Kataas-taasang Pangulo) to distinguish the president of the Katipunan Supreme Council from council presidents of subordinate Katipunan chapters like the Magdalo and Magdiwang; in other words, while Mariano Álvarez was the Magdiwang president and Baldomero Aguinaldo was the Magdalo president, Bonifacio was the Supreme President. Bonifacio suspected the rumor-mongering to be the work of the Magdalo leader, Daniel Tirona. He confronted Tirona, whose airy reply provoked Bonifacio to such anger that he drew a gun and would have shot Tirona had others not intervened.

On December 31, Bonifacio and the Magdalo and Magdiwang leaders held a meeting in Imus, ostensibly to determine the leadership of Cavite in order to end the rivalry between the two factions. The issue of whether the Katipunan should be replaced by a revolutionary government was brought up by the Magdalo, and this eclipsed the rivalry issue. The Magdalo argued that the Katipunan, as a secret society, should have ceased to exist once the Revolution was underway, and that Cavite should not be divided. Bonifacio and the Magdiwang contended that the Katipunan served as their revolutionary government since it had its own constitution, laws, and provincial and municipal governments. Edilberto Evangelista presented a draft constitution for the proposed government to Bonifacio but he rejected it as it was too similar to the Spanish Maura Law. Upon the event of restructuring, Bonifacio was given carte blanche to appoint a committee tasked with setting up a new government; he would also be in charge of this committee. He tasked Emilio Aguinaldo to record the minutes of the meeting and requested for it to establish this authority, but these were never done and never provided.

=== Tejeros Convention ===
On March 22, 1897, the revolutionary leaders held an important meeting in a friar estate residence at Tejeros to resume their discussions regarding the escalating tension between the Magdalo and Magdiwang forces and also to finally settle the issue of governance within the Katipunan through an election. Amidst implications on whether the government of the Katipunan should be established as a monarchy or a republic, Bonifacio maintained it should be the latter. According to him, they were all in opposition to the Spanish Crown, and all of the government's members of any given rank should serve under the principle of liberty, equality, and fraternity, upon which republicanism was founded. Despite Bonifacio's concern on the lack of officials and representatives from other provinces, he was obliged to proceed with the election.

Before the election began, he asked that the results be respected by everyone, and all agreed. The Magdalo faction voted their own Emilio Aguinaldo as President in absentia, as he was in the ongoing battle of Pérez Dasmariñas. The resulting revolutionary government established at Tejeros, calling itself the República de Filipinas (Republic of the Philippines) around a month later, was later superseded by a number of reorganized revolutionary governments also headed by Aguinaldo. These included the República de Filipinas of November 1897, commonly known today as the "Republic of Biak-na-Bato", the Hong Kong Junta government-in-exile, the dictatorial government under which Philippine independence was proclaimed on June 12, 1898, and the revolutionary government now commonly known as the First Philippine Republic or "Malolos Republic", inaugurated on January 23, 1899 as the República Filipina (Philippine Republic). The 1899 government is now officially considered to be the true "first" Republic of the Philippines, with the present-day government of the Philippines thus being the "fifth" Republic.

Bonifacio received the second-highest number of votes for President. Though it was suggested that he be automatically be awarded the Vice Presidency, no one seconded the motion and the election continued. Mariano Trías of the Magdiwang was elected Vice President, while Bonifacio was the last to be elected, as Director of the Interior. Daniel Tirona protested Bonifacio’s appointment on the grounds the office should not be occupied by a person without a lawyer's diploma, suggesting a prominent lawyer for the position such as José del Rosario. Insulted and angered, Bonifacio demanded an apology, as voters had agreed to respect the election results. Tirona ignored Bonifacio's demand for an apology, which drove Bonifacio to draw his gun and again nearly shot Tirona, who hid among the people, but Bonifacio was restrained by Artemio Ricarte of the Magdiwang, who had been elected Captain-General. Bonifacio declared: "In my capacity as chairman of this convention, and as Presidente Supremo of the Most Venerable Katipunan of the Sons of the People, which association is known and acknowledged by all, I hereby declare null and void all matters approved in this meeting." He then promptly left the premises.

=== Repudiation of Tejeros election results ===
On March 23, 1897, the day after the Tejeros Convention, Aguinaldo surreptitiously took his oath of office as President in a chapel officiated by Catholic priest Cenon Villafranca, who was under the authority of Pope Leo XIII in Rome. According to General Santiago Álvarez (son of Mariano), guards were posted outside with strict instructions not to let in any unwanted partisan from the Magdiwang faction while the oath-taking took place. Artemio Ricarte also took his office "with great reluctance" and made a declaration that he found the Tejeros elections "dirty or shady" and "not been in conformity with the true will of the people."

Meanwhile, Bonifacio met with his remaining supporters and drew up the Acta de Tejeros, wherein they gave their reasons for not accepting the election results. Bonifacio alleged the election was fraudulent due to cheating and accused Aguinaldo of treason for his negotiations with the Spanish. In their memoirs Santiago Álvarez and Gregoria de Jesús both alleged that many ballots were already filled out before distribution, and Guillermo Masangkay contended there were more ballots prepared than voters present. Álvarez writes that Bonifacio had been warned by Caviteño leader Diego Mojica of the rigged ballots before the votes were canvassed, but he had done nothing. The Acta de Tejeros was signed by Bonifacio and 44 others, including Ricarte, Mariano Alvarez and Pascual Álvarez. In a later meeting on April 19 in Naic, another document, the Naic Military Agreement, was drawn up which declared that its 41 signatories, "... having discovered the treason committed by certain officers who have been sowing discord and conniving with the Spaniards [and other offensive acts]", had "agreed to deliver the people from this grave danger" by raising an army corps "by persuasion or force" under the command of General Pio del Pilar. The document's 41 signatories included Bonifacio, Ricarte and del Pilar. The meeting was interrupted by Aguinaldo and del Pilar. Mariano Noriel and others present then promptly returned to Aguinaldo's fold. Aguinaldo attempted to persuade Bonifacio to cooperate with his government, but Bonifacio refused and proceeded to Indang, Cavite planning to get out of Cavite and proceed back to Morong.

=== Arrest, trial, and execution ===
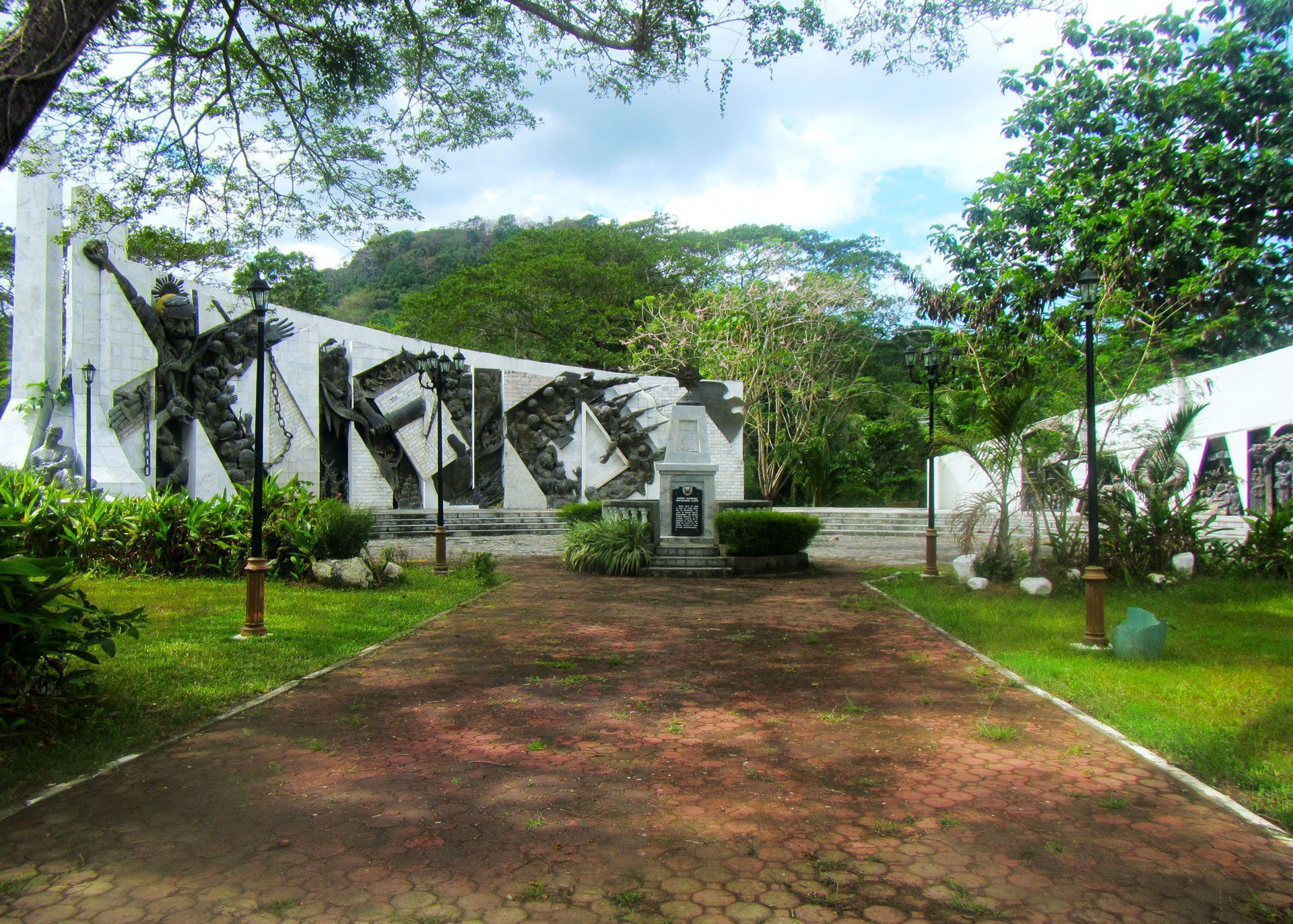
The Bonifacio shrine at the foot of Mount Nagpatong and Mount Buntis in Maragondon, Cavite where he is believed to have been executed on May 10, 1897

In late April, Emilio Aguinaldo fully assumed the presidential office after consolidating his position among the Cavite elite, with most of Bonifacio's Magdiwang supporters shifting allegiance to Aguinaldo. Aguinaldo's government then ordered the arrest of Bonifacio, who was then moving out of Cavite.

In April 1897, Aguinaldo ordered the arrest of Bonifacio after he received a letter that Bonifacio had burned down a village and ordered the burning of the parish house and church of Indang when the townspeople were unable to provide the required supplies and provisions. Many of the principal men of Indang, among them Severino de las Alas (a loyalist and supporter of Bonifacio), presented Aguinaldo with several complaints against Bonifacio that the Supremo's men stole carabaos and other work animals by force and butchered them for food. On April 25, a party of Aguinaldo's men led by Colonel Agapito Bonzón and Major José Ignacio "Intsik" Paua caught up with Bonifacio at his camp in barrio Limbon, Indang. The unsuspecting Bonifacio received them cordially. Early the next day, Bonzón and Paua attacked Bonifacio's camp. Bonifacio was surprised and refused to fight against "fellow Tagalogs", ordering his men to hold their fire, but shots were nevertheless exchanged. Bonifacio was shot in the arm by Bonzón, and Paua stabbed him in the neck but was prevented from striking further by one of Bonifacio's men, who offered to die in Bonifacio's place. Andrés's brother Ciriaco was shot dead, while his other brother Procopio was beaten, and his wife Gregoria may have been raped by Bonzón. From Indang, a half-starved and wounded Bonifacio was carried by hammock to Naic, which had become President Aguinaldo's headquarters.

Bonifacio's party was brought to Naic initially and then to Maragondon, Cavite, where he and Procopio stood trial on May 5, 1897, on charges of sedition and treason against Aguinaldo's government and conspiracy to murder Aguinaldo. The jury was composed entirely of Aguinaldo's men and even Bonifacio's defence lawyer himself declared his client's guilt. Bonifacio was barred from confronting the state witness on the charge of conspiracy to murder on the grounds that the latter had been killed in battle. However, after the trial the witness was seen alive with the prosecutors.

The Bonifacio brothers were found guilty, despite insufficient evidence, and were recommended to be executed. Aguinaldo commuted the sentence to deportation on May 8, 1897, but Pío del Pilar and Mariano Noriel persuaded him to withdraw the order for the sake of preserving unity. In this they were seconded by Mamerto Natividad and other bona fide supporters of Aguinaldo. The Bonifacio brothers were executed on May 10, 1897, in the mountains of Maragondon. Apolinario Mabini wrote that Bonifacio's death demoralized many rebels from Manila, La Laguna and Batangas who had come to help those in Cavite, and caused them to quit. In other areas, Bonifacio's close associates like Emilio Jacinto and Macario Sakay continued the Katipunan and never recognized Aguinaldo's authority.

== Historical controversies ==
The historical assessment of Bonifacio involves several controversial points. His death is alternately viewed as a justified execution for treason, and a "legal murder" fueled by politics. Some historians consider him to be the rightful first President of the Philippines instead of Aguinaldo. Some historians have also advocated that Bonifacio share or even take the place of José Rizal as the (foremost) Philippine national hero. The purported discovery of Bonifacio's remains has also been questioned.

=== Trial and sentencing ===
Historians have condemned the trial of the Bonifacio brothers as unjust. The jury was entirely composed of Aguinaldo's men; Bonifacio's defense lawyer acted more like a prosecutor as he himself declared Bonifacio's guilt and instead appealed for less punishment; and Bonifacio was not allowed to confront the state witness for the charge of conspiracy on the grounds that the latter had been killed in battle, but later the witness was seen with the prosecutors.

Teodoro Agoncillo writes that Bonifacio's declaration of authority in opposition to Aguinaldo posed a danger to the revolution, because a split in the rebel forces would result in almost certain defeat by their united and well-armed Spanish foe. In contrast, Renato Constantino contends that Bonifacio was neither a danger to the revolution in general for he still planned to fight the Spanish, nor to the revolution in Cavite since he was leaving; but Bonifacio was definitely a threat to the Cavite leaders who wanted control of the Revolution, so he was eliminated. Constantino contrasts Bonifacio who had no record of compromise with the Spanish with the Cavite leaders who did compromise, resulting in the Pact of Biak-na-Bato whereas the revolution was officially halted and its leaders exiled, though many Filipinos continued to fight, especially Katipunan leaders who used to be close to Bonifacio. (Aguinaldo, unofficially allied with the United States, eventually did return to take charge of the revolution during the Spanish–American War.)

Historians have also discussed the motives of the Cavite government to replace Bonifacio, and whether it had the right to do so. The Magdalo provincial council which helped establish a republican government led by one of their own was only one of many such councils in the pre-existing Katipunan government. Therefore, Constantino and Alejo Villanueva write that Aguinaldo and his faction may be considered counter-revolutionary as well – as guilty of violating Bonifacio's constituted authority just as they considered Bonifacio to violate theirs. Aguinaldo's own adviser and official Apolinario Mabini writes that he was "primarily answerable for insubordination against the head of the Katipunan of which he was a member". Aguinaldo's authority was not immediately recognized by all rebels. If Bonifacio had escaped Cavite, he would have had the right as the Katipunan leader to prosecute Aguinaldo for treason instead of the other way around. Constantino and Villanueva also interpret the Tejeros Convention as the culmination of a movement by members of the upper class represented by Aguinaldo to wrest power from Bonifacio who represented the middle and lower classes. Regionalism among the Cavite rebels, dubbed "Cavitismo" by Constantino, has also been put forward as motivation for the replacement of Bonifacio. Mabini considered the execution as criminal and "assassination...the first victory of personal ambition over true patriotism." He also noted that "All the electors [at the Tejeros Convention] were friends of Don Emilio Aguinaldo and Don Mariano Trías, who were united, while Bonifacio, although he had established his integrity, was looked upon with distrust only because he was not a native of the province: this explains his resentment."

Writing retrospectively in 1948, Aguinaldo explained that he initially commuted the sentence of death but rescinded his commutation from the pressure of the Consejo de la Guerra (Council of War) including Generals Mariano Noriel, Pío del Pilar, Severino de las Alas, all of whom were supporters and loyalists of Bonifacio, along with General Mamerto Natividad, Sr. and Anastacio Francisco, together with the poet and historian José Clemente Zulueta, among many others.

=== Execution ===
There are differing accounts of Bonifacio's execution. The commanding officer of the execution party, Lázaro Macapagal, said in two separate accounts that the Bonifacio brothers were shot to death, which is the orthodox interpretation. Macapagal's second account has Bonifacio attempting to escape after his brother is shot, but he is also killed while running away. Macapagal writes that they buried the brothers in shallow graves dug with bayonets and marked by twigs.

However, another account states that after his brother was shot, Andrés was stabbed and hacked to death. This was allegedly done while he lay prone in a hammock in which he was carried to the site, being too weak to walk. This version was maintained by Guillermo Masangkay, who claimed to have gotten this information from one of Macapagal's men. Also, one account used to corroborate this version is of an alleged eyewitness, a farmer who claimed he saw five men hacking a man in a hammock. Historian Milagros Guerrero also says Bonifacio was bayoneted, and that the brothers were left unburied. After bones said to be Bonifacio's – including a fractured skull – were discovered in 1918, Masangkay claimed the forensic evidence supported his version of events. Writer Adrián Cristobal notes how accounts of Bonifacio's captivity and trial state he was very weak due to his wounds being left untreated; he thus doubts Bonifacio was strong enough to make a last dash for freedom as Macapagal claimed. Historian Ambeth Ocampo, who doubts the Bonifacio bones were authentic, thus also doubts the possibility of Bonifacio's death by this manner.

=== Bonifacio as first President of the Republic of the Philippines ===
Some historians such as Milagros Guerrero, Emmanuel Encarnación, Ramón Villegas, and Michael Charleston Chua have pushed for the recognition of Bonifacio as the first President of the Philippines instead of Aguinaldo, the officially recognized one. This view emphasizes that Bonifacio was not just the leader of the Katipunan as a revolutionary secret society, as traditional historiography has emphasized, but that he also established and headed a revolutionary government through the Katipunan from 1896 to 1897, before a revolutionary government headed by Aguinaldo was first formed at the Tejeros Convention. Guerrero writes that Bonifacio had a concept of the Philippine nation called Haring Bayang Katagalugan ("Sovereign Tagalog Nation") which was displaced by Aguinaldo's concept of Filipinas. In documents predating Tejeros and the First Philippine Republic of 1899, Bonifacio is called the president of the "Sovereign [Tagalog] Nation" and the "Tagalog Republic".

The term Tagalog historically refers to an ethnic group, their language, and script. Historians have thus viewed Bonifacio's concept of the Philippine nation as restricted to the Tagalog-speaking regions of Luzon, as compared to Aguinaldo's view of Luzon, Visayas, and Mindanao (comprising the modern Philippines). In their memoirs, Emilio Aguinaldo and other Magdalo people claim Bonifacio became the head of the Magdiwang, receiving the title Harì ng Bayan ("King of the Nation") with Mariano Álvarez as his second-in-command. Historians such as Carlos Quirino and Michael Charleston Chua suggest these claims stem from a misunderstanding or misrepresentation of Bonifacio's neologism Haring Bayan ("Sovereign Nation") as referring to Bonifacio himself instead of his concept of the nation, as was in truth reflected in his title Pangulo ng Haring Bayang Katagalugan ("President of the Sovereign Tagalog Nation"), sometimes shortened to Pangulo ng Haring Bayan ("President of the Sovereign Nation"). Santiago Álvarez (son of Mariano) distinguishes between the Magdiwang government and the Katipunan Supreme Council headed by Bonifacio.

According to historian Chua, the "first President" issue has been confounded by over a century of Philippine historiography most often referring to Bonifacio as "The Supremo" and taking it to mean "The Supreme Leader", thus ultimately taking him to have had dictatorial or monarchist ambitions as opposed to the later democratic and republican Philippine Presidents, when in fact "Supremo" was only a contraction of Spanish Presidente Supremo - a translation of Bonifacio's actual title as head of the Katipunan in Tagalog, Kataas-taasang Pangulo (Supreme President) - and based on surviving documents, Bonifacio generally did not call himself by the plain term "Supremo" despite other people's usage, but instead styled himself "Pangulo", i.e. President. Chua further writes:

...even inside the Katipunan, Bonifacio struggled to make people understand his concept of the Haring Bayan not as an individual or a King, but as something else... Haring Bayan really meant the King, or the power, is the people (Haring Bayan), which is basically "The Sovereign Nation"... So when he signed himself as Pangulo ng Haring Bayan past 24 August 1896, that means he intended to be president of a national revolutionary government which aimed to be a democracy.

=== Bonifacio as national hero ===
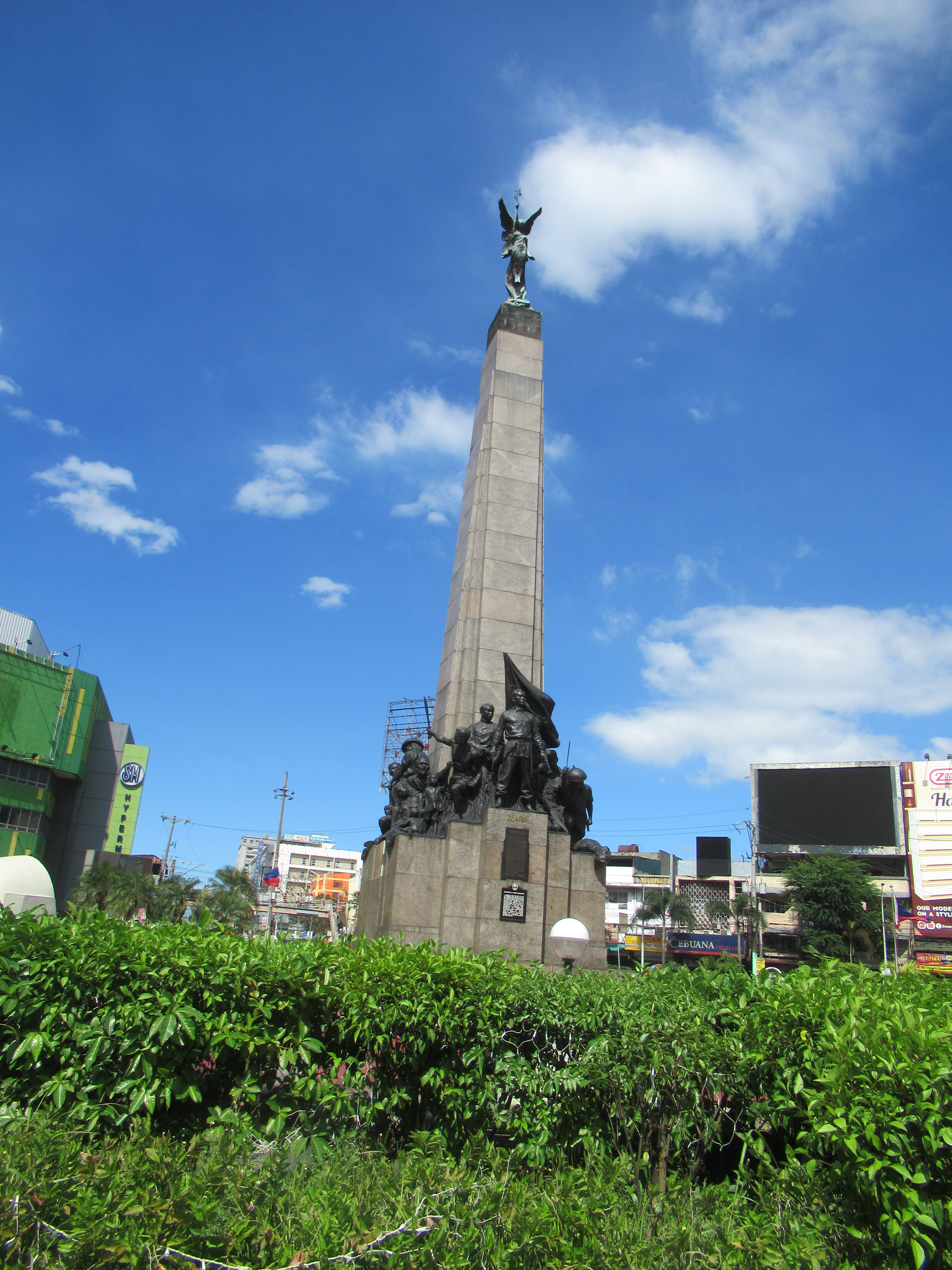
Andrés Bonifacio Monument in Caloocan is considered the most symbolic of all the monuments in the country, even grander than Motto Stella. It is sculpted by National Artist Guillermo Tolentino.

José Rizal is generally considered the foremost of the national heroes of the Philippines and often "the" national hero, albeit not in law, but Bonifacio has been suggested as a more worthy candidate on the grounds of having started the Philippine Revolution. Teodoro Agoncillo notes that the Philippine national hero, unlike those of other countries, is not "the leader of its liberation forces". Renato Constantino writes that Rizal is a "United States-sponsored hero" who was promoted as the greatest Filipino hero during the American Occupation period of the Philippines – after Aguinaldo lost the Philippine–American War. The United States promoted Rizal, who was taken to represent peaceful political advocacy, instead of more radical figures whose ideas could inspire resistance against American rule. Specifically, Rizal was selected over Bonifacio who was viewed as "too radical" and Apolinario Mabini who was "unregenerate."

Historian Ambeth Ocampo gives the opinion that arguing for Bonifacio as the "better" hero on the grounds that he, not Rizal, began the Philippine Revolution, is moot since Rizal inspired Bonifacio, the Katipunan, and the Revolution. Even prior to his banishment to Dapitan, Rizal was already regarded by the Filipino people as a national hero, having been elected as honorary president by the Katipunan. Other historians also detail that Bonifacio was a follower of Rizal's La Liga Filipina. León María Guerrero notes that while Rizal did not give his blessing to the Katipunan because he believed the time was premature, he did not condemn the aim of independence per se. Teodoro Agoncillo gives the opinion that Bonifacio should not replace Rizal as national hero, but they should be honored "side by side".

Despite popular recognition of Rizal as "the Philippine national hero", the title itself has no explicit legal definition in present Philippine law. Rizal and Bonifacio, however, are given the implied recognition of being national heroes because they are commemorated annually nationwide – Rizal Day on December 30 and Bonifacio Day on November 30. According to the website of the National Commission for Culture and the Arts:

Despite the lack of any official declaration explicitly proclaiming them as national heroes, [Rizal and Bonifacio] remain admired and revered for their roles in Philippine history. Heroes, according to historians, should not be legislated. Their appreciation should be better left to academics. Acclamation for heroes, they felt, would be recognition enough.

=== Bonifacio's bones ===
In 1918, the American occupational government of the Philippines mounted a search for Bonifacio's remains in Maragondon. A group consisting of government officials, former rebels, and a man reputed to be Bonifacio's servant found bones which they claimed were Bonifacio's in a sugarcane field on March 17. The bones were placed in an urn and put into the care of the National Library of the Philippines. They were housed at the Library's headquarters in the Legislative Building in Ermita, Manila, together with some of Bonifacio's papers and personal belongings. The authenticity of the bones was much disputed at the time and has been challenged as late as 2001 by Ambeth Ocampo. When Emilio Aguinaldo ran for President of the Commonwealth of the Philippines in 1935, his opponent Manuel L. Quezon (the eventual victor) invoked the memory of Bonifacio against him, the bones being the result of Bonifacio's execution by the judiciary branch of the revolutionary government headed by Aguinaldo. During World War II, the Philippines was invaded by Japan beginning on December 8, 1941. The bones were lost due to the widespread destruction and looting during the Allied capture of Manila in February 1945.

== Notes ==
Political offices
New office	Unofficial President of the Sovereign Tagalog Nation; August 24, 1896 – March 10 or 22, 1897	Succeeded by Emilio Aguinaldo as President of the Philippines
