= Battle of Pasong Tamo =

1896 conflict in the Philippine Revolution

- Part of the Philippine Revolution
- Bonifacio's Battle Flag
Date	August 25, 1896
Location	Pasong Tamo, Caloocan, Manila, Captaincy General of the Philippines
Result	Mutual Withdrawal: Katipuneros retreat to Balara; Spanish Forces also withdrew; Major revolts and uprisings began in other Provinces.

Belligerents
Katipunan	Spanish Empire

Commanders and leaders
Andrés Bonifacio; Emilio Jacinto	Manuel Ros

Strength
100+	30 Guardia Civil

Casualties and losses
light; 2 confirmed dead	unknown

The Battle of Pasong Tamo was a series of short skirmishes shortly after the Cry of Balintawak between the remaining Katipuneros in Caloocan and the Guardia Civil.

== Background ==
After the discovery of the Katipunan, the Spanish Government in Manila began arresting wealthy ilustrados and other suspected Katipuneros. Realizing that war was imminent, Andrés Bonifacio along with the revolutionaries of Manila escaped to Caloocan to the wilderness of Pugad Lawin where they tore their cedulas in revolt, however, this demonstration was done in secret, and the real mass gathering happened near the house of Melchora Aquino in Balintawak, in plain view of the nearby Guardia Civil. After this incident, Bonifacio issued a manifesto urging Filipinos to prepare for the attack on Manila. No sooner did he issue the manifesto, Bonifacio then ordered the attack on Manila, instead his force amassed near San Juan del Monte on August 30.

== Earlier skirmishes ==
Upon the discovery of the Katipunan, Bonifacio sent a circular to all Katipunan councils to a meeting in Balintawak or Kangkong to discuss their situation. This is dated by historian Teodoro Agoncillo to August 19 and by revolutionary leader Santiago Álvarez to August 22. On August 21, Katipuneros were already congregating in Balintawak in Caloocan. Late in the evening amidst heavy rain, the rebels moved to Kangkong in Caloocan, and arrived there past midnight. As a precaution, the rebels moved to Bahay Toro or Pugad Lawin on August 23. Agoncillo places the Cry and tearing of certificates at this point the house of Juan Ramos at Pugad Lawin. Alvarez writes that they met at the house of Melchora Aquino (known as Tandang Sora, and mother of Juan Ramos) in Bahay Toro on that date. Agoncillo places Aquino's house in Pasong Tamo and the meeting there on August 24. In any case, rebels continued to congregate and by August 24, they were over a thousand strong. On August 24, it was decided to notify the Katipunan councils of the surrounding towns that a general attack on the capital Manila was planned for August 29. Bonifacio appointed generals to lead rebel forces to Manila. Before hostilities erupted, Bonifacio also reorganized the Katipunan into an open revolutionary government, with him as President and the Supreme Council of the Katipunan as his cabinet. On the morning of the 25th, and Spanish Civil guard unit attacked the rebels, having a greater number but lesser arms than the Spaniards, the rebels disengaged after a few minutes with casualties on both sides. The next day, the rebels attacked again, this time, they retreated to Balara. Bonifacio is said to have rested in Diliman at noon, in the afternoon, Civil Guards began investigating attacks on Chinese merchants done by bandits with rebel affiliation, they came across a group of Katipuneros and investigated them, the commander of the guards, Lt. Manuel Ros reported the incidents to Ramón Blanco y Erenas, and this urged him to prepare for hostilities. Bonifacio then moved to San Felipe Neri where he sent his manifesto to the revolutionaries calling for the attack on Manila.→→→→→→

== Battle ==
The initial fighting also occurred that day. After the historic tearing up of the hated Spanish cedulas, Bonifacio was informed by some women that a detachment of Guardia Civil consisting of 30 soldiers under the command of Lieutenant Manuel Ros was approaching Malabon. Bonifacio ordered his men to go to the farm of Tandang Sora (Melchora Aquino) in Gulod ng Banilad near Pasong Tamo. He deployed his men, armed with bolos and anting-antings, around a broken bridge spanning a brook in Pasong Tamo. As the enemy approached, the patriots attacked them. Although outnumbered, the enemy fought well as their Mausers and Remingtons mowed down the katipuneros. The first Katipunan casualty was Simplicio Acabo, cabeza de barangay of Dulong Kalzada. He was rushing at a Spanish soldier with his sharp bolo and was killed by a shot. The rebels lost two men and the spanish lost one man. Unable to overcome the enemy, Bonifacio ordered a retreat. The Spanish, realizing they are outnumbered although well armed, also retreated. Other small revolts sprung up in San Pedro de Macati, Las Piñas and Parañaque. While major revolts and uprisings began in Cavite Viejo, Laguna, Batangas, Tarlac, Nueva Ecija, Manila, Pampanga and Ilocos.
