= Pag-ibig sa Tinubuang Lupa =

Poem by Andres Bonifacio

Pag-ibig sa Tinubuang lupa (English Translation: Love for One's Homeland) is a poem written by hero Andres Bonifacio. The said poem was published in the first issue of Kalayaan. The poem exhorted Filipinos to join the crusade to achieve real Philippine independence. Bonifacio used the initials "A.I.B." that stands for Agapito Bagumbayan, Bonifacio's pseudonym along with the poem "Ang Dapat Mabatid ng Tagalog", another piece written by Bonifacio, according to historian Jim Richardson. The poem first appeared in the Katipunan's newsletter in 1896.
