= Dapitan Heritage Zone =

Historic district in Zamboanga del Norte, Philippines

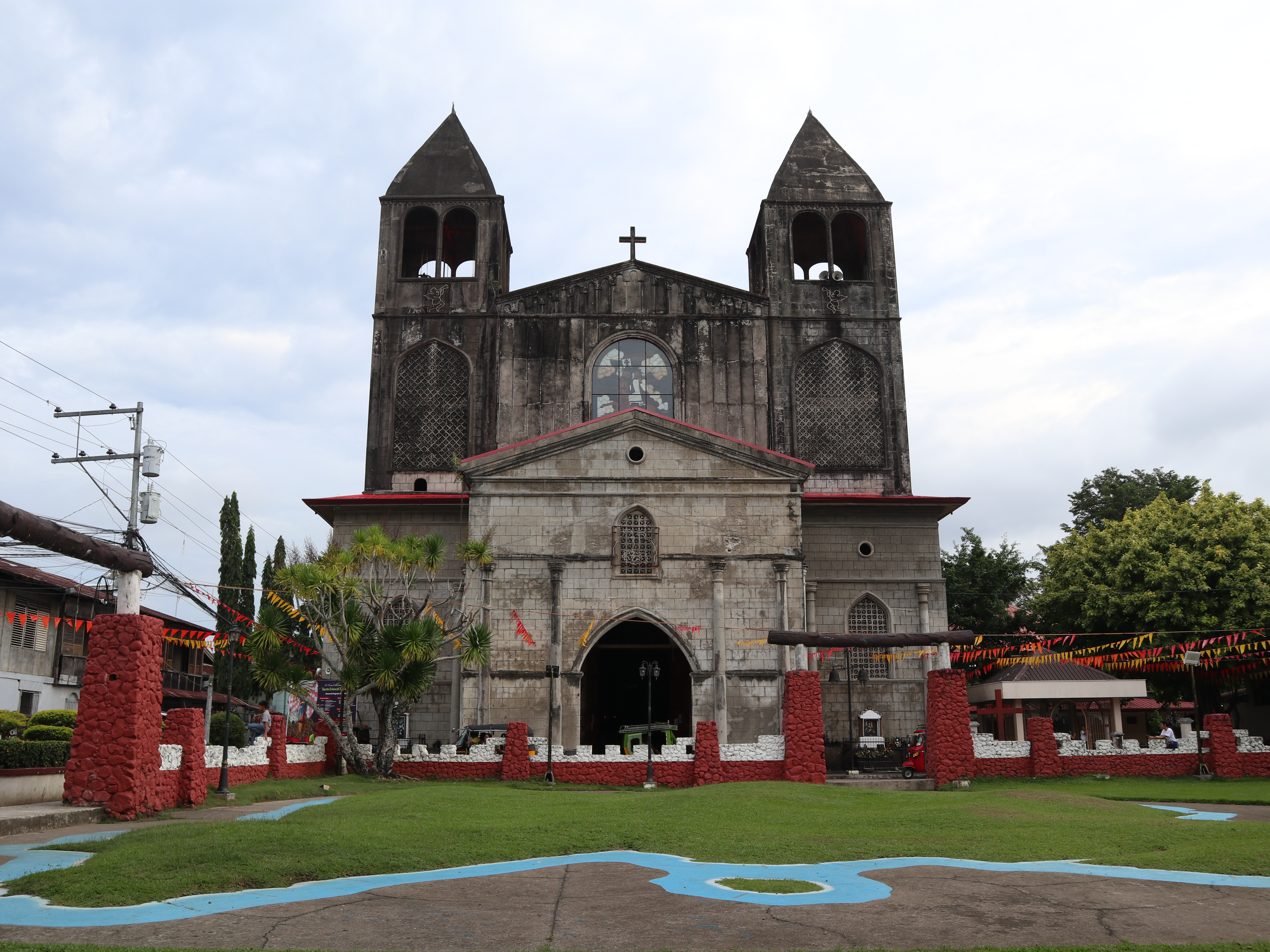
- The Saint James, the Greater Parish Church located at the center of the Dapitan Heritage Zone

- Location within Philippines
- 8°39′29.4″N 123°25′25.5″E
- Location: Dapitan, Philippines

Site notes
- Governing body: City government of Dapitan

The Dapitan Heritage Zone or Dapitan Historic Center is a declared historic district in Dapitan, Philippines. Because of its prehistoric origins, collection of heritage structures and role in the exile of local patriot Dr. Jose Rizal, the National Historical Commission of the Philippines declared a specific portion of the city, along with its heritage structures, as a Heritage Zone or Historic Center in 2011. The declaration was made in coordination with the 150th birth anniversary of Dr. Rizal in June 2011.

== Rationale for Declaration as Heritage Zone/Historic Center ==
The NHCP board resolution cites several reasons for the declaration of certain areas in downtown Dapitan as Heritage Zone/Historic Center:

1. Dapitan is considered as one of the oldest settlements in Northern Mindanao
2. Dapitan was founded as a mission by the Jesuits in 1629
3. Dr. Jose Rizal was exiled in Dapitan, initially detained at the Casa Real before being transferred to Talisay (now the José Rizal Memorial Protected Landscape in Dapitan)
4. Downtown Dapitan showcases a good number of heritage structures, some of which are officially declared by national government agencies as National Historical Landmarks and National Cultural Treasure

== List of Cultural Properties of the Philippines in Dapitan ==
Cultural Property wmph identifier (Note: wmph is an internal identifier used by Wikimedia Philippines to identify the monument. This is not an official identifier, and only shown temporarily in the templates until the government creates an updated complete list.)	Site name	Description	Province	City or municipality	Address	Coordinates	Image
	Dapitan Health Office and Police Office	A very old built structure housing the city health office and police office	Zamboanga del Norte	Dapitan, Zamboanga del Norte	Gov. Guading Adasa Street	8°39′17″N 123°25′26″E	Upload file
	Pablo Page Ancestral House	Pablo Page and Petra Bajamunde Ancestral House. This is also used as a commercial food establishment of native delicacies. It is named Corazon de Dapitan	Zamboanga del Norte	Dapitan, Zamboanga del Norte	Justice Florentino Saguin Street	8°39′22″N 123°25′30″E	Upload file
	Laput-Ancheta Ancestral House	This is said to be a century old house.	Zamboanga del Norte	Dapitan, Zamboanga del Norte	Jose Rizal Avenue	8°39′25″N 123°25′36″E	Upload file
	Aseniero Ancestral House	An ancestral house owned by the Asenieros	Zamboanga del Norte	Dapitan, Zamboanga del Norte	Jose Rizal Avenue	8°39′32″N 123°25′30″E	Upload file
	Old Commission on Election Office	This is the abandoned office of the ComElec	Zamboanga del Norte	Dapitan, Zamboanga del Norte	Mi Retiro Street	8°39′10″N 123°25′27″E	Upload file
	Junio Ancestral House	An ancestral house owned by the Junios located right behind the St. James the Greater Church	Zamboanga del Norte	Dapitan, Zamboanga del Norte	Leonor Rivera Street	8°39′15″N 123°25′31″E	Upload file
	Bajamunde Ancestral House	An ancestral house owned by the late Gregorio Bajamunde - one of the prominent families in Dapitan	Zamboanga del Norte	Dapitan, Zamboanga del Norte	Manuel L. Quezon Avenue	8°39′23″N 123°25′30″E	Upload file
	Aseniero-Adraincem Ancestral House	An ancestral house owned by the late Mariano Aseniero and Floria Adraincem	Zamboanga del Norte	Dapitan, Zamboanga del Norte	Doña Trinidad Rizal Street	8°39′33″N 123°25′28″E	Upload file
	Dionisio Chiong Ancestral House	An ancestral house owned by the late Dionisio Chiong. Today, it is being used as a pharmacy.	Zamboanga del Norte	Dapitan, Zamboanga del Norte	Justice Florentino Saguin Street	8°39′21″N 123°25′30″E	Upload file
	Aniano Adasa Ancestral House	An ancestral house owned by the late Aniano Adasa. Today, it houses the local tourism office of Dapitan.	Zamboanga del Norte	Dapitan, Zamboanga del Norte	Josephine Bracken Street	8°39′25″N 123°25′28″E	Upload file
	Tomboc Ancestral House	An ancestral house owned by the Tombocs possibly built in the 1900s	Zamboanga del Norte	Dapitan, Zamboanga del Norte	Andres Bonifacio Avenue	8°39′29″N 123°25′28″E	Upload file
	Dondoyano Ancestral House	An ancestral house owned by the Dondoyanos possibly built in the 1940s	Zamboanga del Norte	Dapitan, Zamboanga del Norte	Andres Bonifacio Avenue	8°39′28″N 123°25′29″E	Upload file
	Hamoy Ancestral House	An ancestral house owned by the Hamoys possibly built in the 1940s	Zamboanga del Norte	Dapitan, Zamboanga del Norte	Andres Bonifacio Avenue	8°39′30″N 123°25′27″E	Upload file
	Saldon Ancestral House	An ancestral house owned by the late Benjamin Saldon built in 1951	Zamboanga del Norte	Dapitan, Zamboanga del Norte	Andres Bonifacio Avenue	8°39′31″N 123°25′26″E	Upload file
	Padao Ancestral House	An ancestral house owned by the late Edgar Padao built in the 1910s	Zamboanga del Norte	Dapitan, Zamboanga del Norte	Andres Bonifacio Avenue	8°39′08″N 123°25′27″E	Upload file
	Office of the Sangguniang Panglungsod	The former City Hospital before it became the Sangguniang Panglungsod of Dapitan	Zamboanga del Norte	Dapitan, Zamboanga del Norte	Corner Justice Florentino Saguin and Ipil-Dipolog Hwy	8°39′20″N 123°25′30″E	Upload file
	Singco Ancestral House	House built by Tolentino Singco in the 1950s	Zamboanga del Norte	Dapitan, Zamboanga del Norte	Jose Rizal Avenue	8°39′30″N 123°25′31″E	Upload file
	Dalman Ancestral House	Heritage house owned by the Dalmans	Zamboanga del Norte	Dapitan, Zamboanga del Norte	Corner Gov. Guading Adasa Street and Justice Florentino Saguin Street	8°39′19″N 123°25′26″E	Upload file
	Adriatico Ancestral House	Heritage house built by Ester Adriatico in the 1920s	Zamboanga del Norte	Dapitan, Zamboanga del Norte	Jose Rizal Avenue	8°39′29″N 123°25′32″E	Upload file
	Hamoy Ancestral House	Heritage house owned by the Hamoys. Possibly built in the 1900s	Zamboanga del Norte	Dapitan, Zamboanga del Norte	Mi Retiro Street	8°39′09″N 123°25′28″E	Upload file
	Caidic House	Heritage house built by Gaspar Caidic	Zamboanga del Norte	Dapitan, Zamboanga del Norte	El Filibusterismo Street	8°39′00″N 123°25′30″E	Upload file
	Acaylar House	Heritage house built by Cadios Acaylar in the 1950s	Zamboanga del Norte	Dapitan, Zamboanga del Norte	Corner Noli Me Tangere and El Filibusterismo Street	8°39′01″N 123°25′26″E	Upload file
	Cuartero House	Heritage house built by Tomas Cuartero in the 1940s	Zamboanga del Norte	Dapitan, Zamboanga del Norte	F. Blumentritt Street	8°39′45″N 123°25′21″E	Upload file
	Otchotorena House	Heritage house owned by Otchotorenas built in the 1950s	Zamboanga del Norte	Dapitan, Zamboanga del Norte	Jose Rizal Avenue	8°39′27″N 123°25′33″E	Upload file
	Elumbaring Ancestral House	Heritage house owned by the Elumbaring Family	Zamboanga del Norte	Dapitan, Zamboanga del Norte	El Filibusterismo Street	8°39′01″N 123°25′30″E	Upload file
	Bajamunde Ancestral House	Heritage house built by Lorenzo Bajamunde in 1945	Zamboanga del Norte	Dapitan, Zamboanga del Norte	Jose Rizal Avenue	8°39′42″N 123°25′22″E	Upload file
	Dalman House	Heritage house currently owned by Ruby Dalman. Possibly built in the 1940s	Zamboanga del Norte	Dapitan, Zamboanga del Norte	Mi Retiro Street	8°39′42″N 123°25′22″E	Upload file
	Bagting Ancestral House	Heritage house currently owned by the Bagtings	Zamboanga del Norte	Dapitan, Zamboanga del Norte	Jose Rizal Avenue	8°39′44″N 123°25′20″E	Upload file
	Jimmy Adasa Ancestral House	Heritage house built by Jimmy Adasa. Today, the ground floor is used as a mechanical shop.	Zamboanga del Norte	Dapitan, Zamboanga del Norte	Jose Rizal Avenue	8°39′45″N 123°25′20″E	Upload file
	Severina Icao Ancestral House	Heritage house built by Severina Icao. Today, the ground floor is used as small convenient store. Possibly built in the 1930s.	Zamboanga del Norte	Dapitan, Zamboanga del Norte	Noli Me Tangere Street	8°39′00″N 123°25′26″E	Upload file
	Sagario Icao Ancestral House	Heritage house built by Sagario Icao. Possibly built in the 1920s.	Zamboanga del Norte	Dapitan, Zamboanga del Norte	Noli Me Tangere Street	8°39′00″N 123°25′25″E	Upload file
	Sy-Gaco Ancestral House	Heritage house built by Calexto Sy-Gaco at around 1940s	Zamboanga del Norte	Dapitan, Zamboanga del Norte	Mi. Retiro Street	8°39′05″N 123°25′29″E	Upload file
	Elumbar Ancestral House	Heritage house built by Victoria Elumbar.	Zamboanga del Norte	Dapitan, Zamboanga del Norte	El Filibusterismo Street	8°39′01″N 123°25′26″E	Upload file
	Balisado Ancestral House	Heritage house owned by the Balisados. Their family is one of the political icons in Dapitan.	Zamboanga del Norte	Dapitan, Zamboanga del Norte	El Filibusterismo Street	8°39′02″N 123°25′26″E	Upload file
	Bajamunde Ancestral House (Sibling of Page Bajamunde)	Another heritage house owned by the Bajamundes, a prominent family in Dapitan indeed. Today, the ground floor of the structure is being used as a commercial/business establishment	Zamboanga del Norte	Dapitan, Zamboanga del Norte	Leonor Rivera Street	8°39′14″N 123°25′26″E	Upload file
	Carreon House (Sibling of Page Bajamunde)	A built heritage owned by the Carreons.	Zamboanga del Norte	Dapitan, Zamboanga del Norte	Governor Carnicero Street	8°39′03″N 123°25′30″E	Upload file
	Philippine Coconut Authority Office	A heritage structure in Dapitan that currently houses the PCA office.	Zamboanga del Norte	Dapitan, Zamboanga del Norte	Ipil-Dipolog Hwy	8°39′19″N 123°25′30″E	Upload file
	Public Services Division of Dapitan	A heritage structure in Dapitan that currently houses another public office of Dapitan.	Zamboanga del Norte	Dapitan, Zamboanga del Norte	Ipil-Dipolog Hwy	8°39′18″N 123°25′30″E	Upload file
	Office of the Senior Citizens Association of Brgy Potol Dapitan	A heritage structure in Dapitan that currently houses the office of the senior citizens.	Zamboanga del Norte	Dapitan, Zamboanga del Norte	Ipil-Dipolog Hwy	8°39′17″N 123°25′30″E	Upload file
	Dapitan Department of Education	DepEd	Zamboanga del Norte	Dapitan, Zamboanga del Norte	Justice Florentino Saguin St.	8°39′20″N 123°25′27″E	Upload file
	Casa Redonda	The octagonal hut served as Rizal's clinic and as dormitory of some of his pupils. Reconstructed with similar materials as the main house, it now stands as a reminder of the numerous medications performed by Rizal during his exile in Dapitan.	Zamboanga del Norte	Dapitan, Zamboanga del Norte		8°40′03″N 123°25′01″E	Upload file
	Casa Residencia	Reconstructed in 1960, this rectangular house sheltered Jose Rizal from March 1893 until he left Dapitan in July 31, 1896. It has a bedroom and features a veranda on three of its four walls and a comfort room accessible through a bridge at the rear. On various occasions, the house also sheltered Rizal's mother, Teodora, his sisters Trinidad, Maria and Narcisa, some nephews, his niece Angelica and his loved one Josephine Bracken.	Zamboanga del Norte	Dapitan, Zamboanga del Norte		8°40′05″N 123°25′00″E	Upload file
	Casa Cuadrada	Rizal effected the construction of the house to accommodate the growing number of pupils in his Talisay School. The area underneath the hut served as workshop of his pupils.	Zamboanga del Norte	Dapitan, Zamboanga del Norte		8°40′03″N 123°24′59″E	Upload file
	Rizal's Kitchen	Reconstructed at the same time and with similar materials as the main house, the kitchen has a dimension of approximately fourteen (14) feet by ten (10) feet and is open on all sides from waist up to facilitate airflow and prevent smoke from being trapped inside.	Zamboanga del Norte	Dapitan, Zamboanga del Norte		8°40′03″N 123°24′59″E	Upload file
	Rizal's Redonda Piqueña	Restored to its original hexagonal form with similar materials as the other huts, the poultry house is big enough to accommodate a few dozens chickens.	Zamboanga del Norte	Dapitan, Zamboanga del Norte		8°40′03″N 123°24′59″E	Upload file
	Casitad de Salud	These huts were used as a clinic where Rizal performed various operations - one hut for the males and one for the females.	Zamboanga del Norte	Dapitan, Zamboanga del Norte		8°40′03″N 123°24′59″E	Upload file
	Rizal Shrine Mini-Theater	This theater held many events where Rizal taught arts such as poems composition and other subject.	Zamboanga del Norte	Dapitan, Zamboanga del Norte		8°40′03″N 123°24′59″E	Upload file

== See also ==
- Philippine Registry of Cultural Property
- List of historical markers of the Philippines in Zamboanga Peninsula
