= Kartilya ng Katipunan =

Guidebook for new members

- Author: Emilio Jacinto

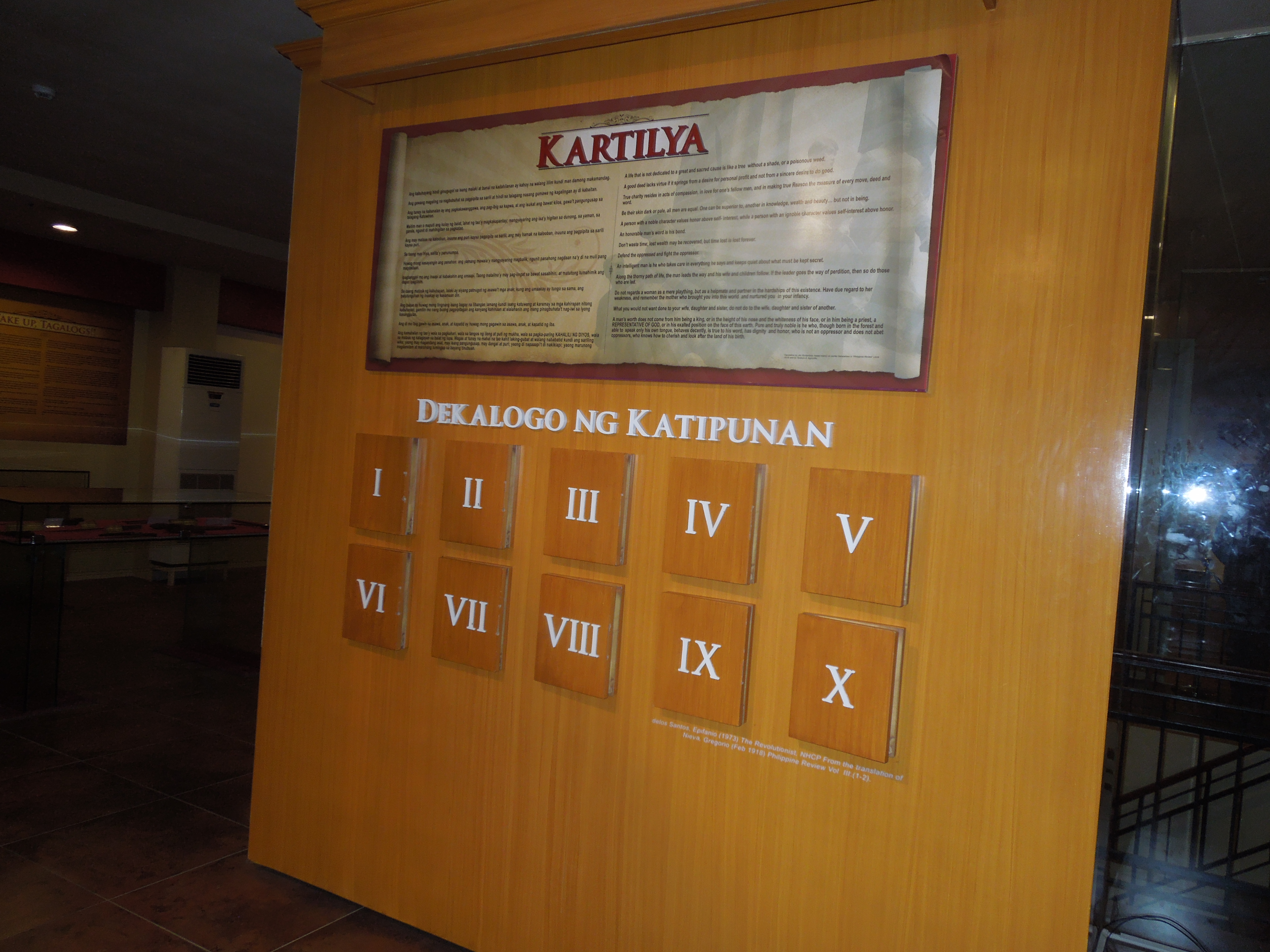
Kartilya at Museo ng Katipunan

The Kartilya ng Katipunan (English: Primer of the Katipunan) served as the guidebook for new members of the organization, which laid out the group's rules and principles. The first edition of the Kartilya was written by Emilio Jacinto. Andrés Bonifacio later wrote a revised Decalogue. The Decalogue, originally titled Katungkulang Gagawin ng mga Z. Ll. B. (Duties of the Sons of the People), was never published because Bonifacio believed that Jacinto's Kartilya was superior to what he had made.
