= Mariano Hamoy House =

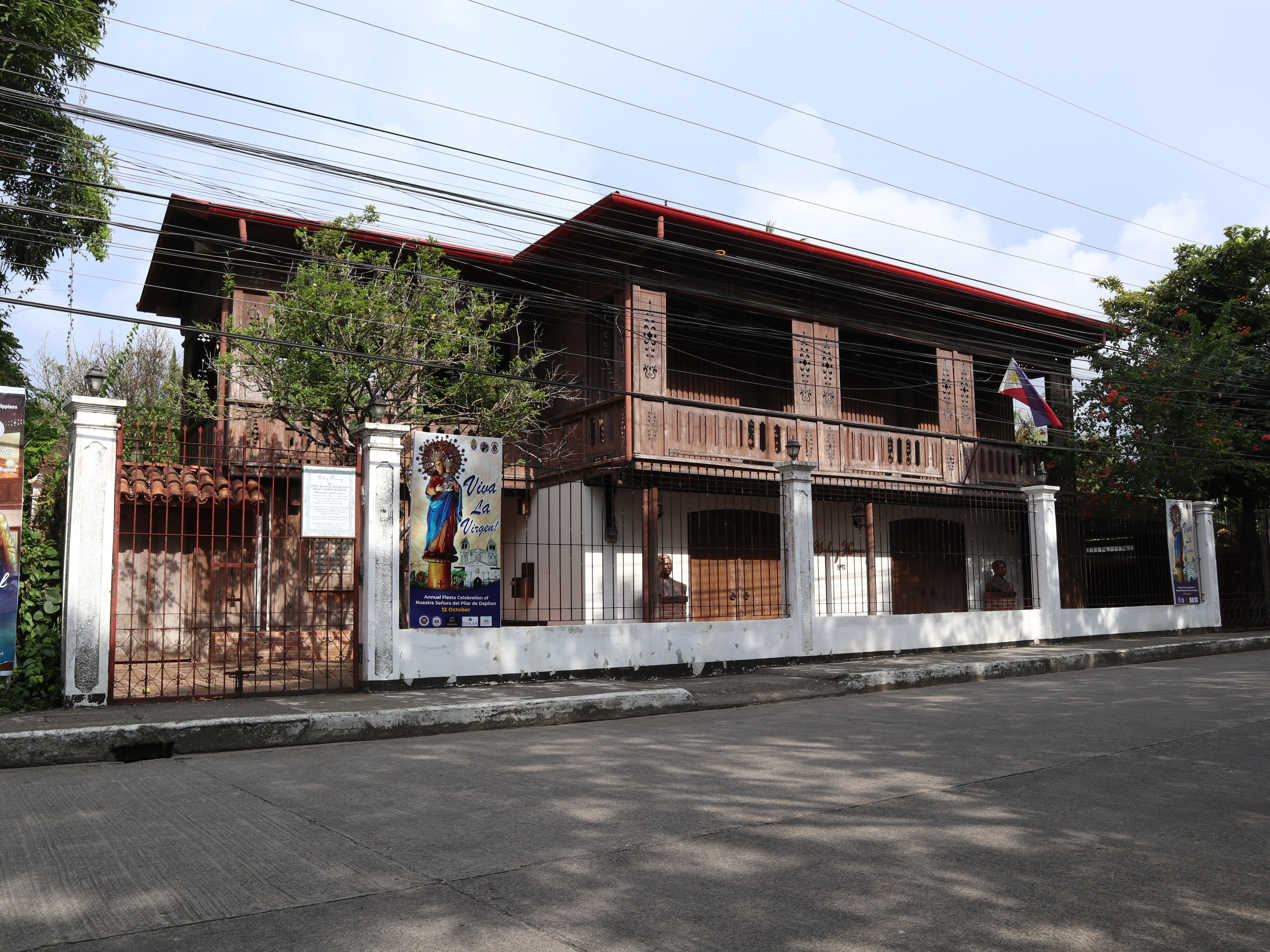
- Front of Mariano Hamoy House

- Location in the Mindanao Location in the Philippines
- Location: Dapitan, Zamboanga del Norte, Philippines
- Coordinates: 8°39′08″N 123°25′29″E
- Type: Heritage museum
- Curator: Peter Hamoy
- Building details

General information
- Type: House
- Completed: 1893
- Renovated: 2020–22

The Mariano Hamoy House is an ancestral house in Dapitan, Zamboanga del Norte, Philippines. It now serves as a heritage museum, known as Balay Hamoy Museum, displaying materials relevant to Rizal's exile in Dapitan from 1892 to 1896.

== History ==
Built in 1893, the house was the residence of Mariano Hamoy. He was a friend of Philippine national hero Jose Rizal and his schoolmate at the Ateneo Municipal de Manila in Intramuros.

Rizal was a frequent visitor in the house during his exile in Dapitan from 1892 to 1896. He would visit Hamoy for a game of chess and conversation. They became business partners in abaca trading, and the house served as warehouse

Rizal also served as the family physician. In 1894, Rizal attended to the child delivery of Hamoy's wife at the house.

== Museum ==
The house has since been preserved and underwent restoration from 2020 to 2022. It currently serves as a museum, displaying jars, clothes, sewing machines, furniture, religious item, and other personal effects. The chess set used by Hamoy and Rizal, and the steamer trunk given to Hamoy by Rizal are on display.

== Recognition ==
Mariano Hamoy House received a historical marker from the National Historical Commission of the Philippines in 2024.
