= Emilio Jacinto =

Filipino revolutionary (1875–1899)

- Born: Emilio Jacinto y Dizon; December 15, 1875; Tondo, Manila, Captaincy General of the Philippines, Spanish Empire
- Died: April 16, 1899 (aged 23); Santa Cruz, Laguna, First Philippine Republic
- Resting place: Himlayang Pilipino, Tandang Sora, Quezon City, Philippines
- Other names: "Pingkian", "Dimasilaw", "Ka Ilyong"
- Education: Colegio de San Juan de Letran; University of Santo Tomas
- Spouse: Catalina de Jesús

Emilio Jacinto y Dizon (Spanish: [eˈmi.ljo xaˈsinto]; December 15, 1875 – April 16, 1899) was a Filipino general during the Philippine Revolution. He was one of the highest-ranking officers in the Philippine Revolution and was one of the highest-ranking officers of the revolutionary society Kataas-taasang, Kagalang-galang na Katipunan ng mga Anak ng Bayan, or simply and more popularly called Katipunan, being a member of its Supreme Council. He was elected Secretary of State for the Haring Bayang Katagalugan, a revolutionary government established during the outbreak of hostilities. He is popularly known in Philippine history textbooks as the Brains of the Katipunan (Filipino:Utak ng Katipunan) while some contend he should be rightfully recognized as the "Brains of the Revolution" (Filipino: Utak ng Himagsikan, a title that is usually given to Apolinario Mabini). Jacinto was present in the so-called Cry of Pugad Lawin (or Cry of Balintawak) with Andrés Bonifacio, the Supremo (Supreme President) of the Katipunan, and others of its members which signaled the start of the Revolution against the Spanish government in the islands.

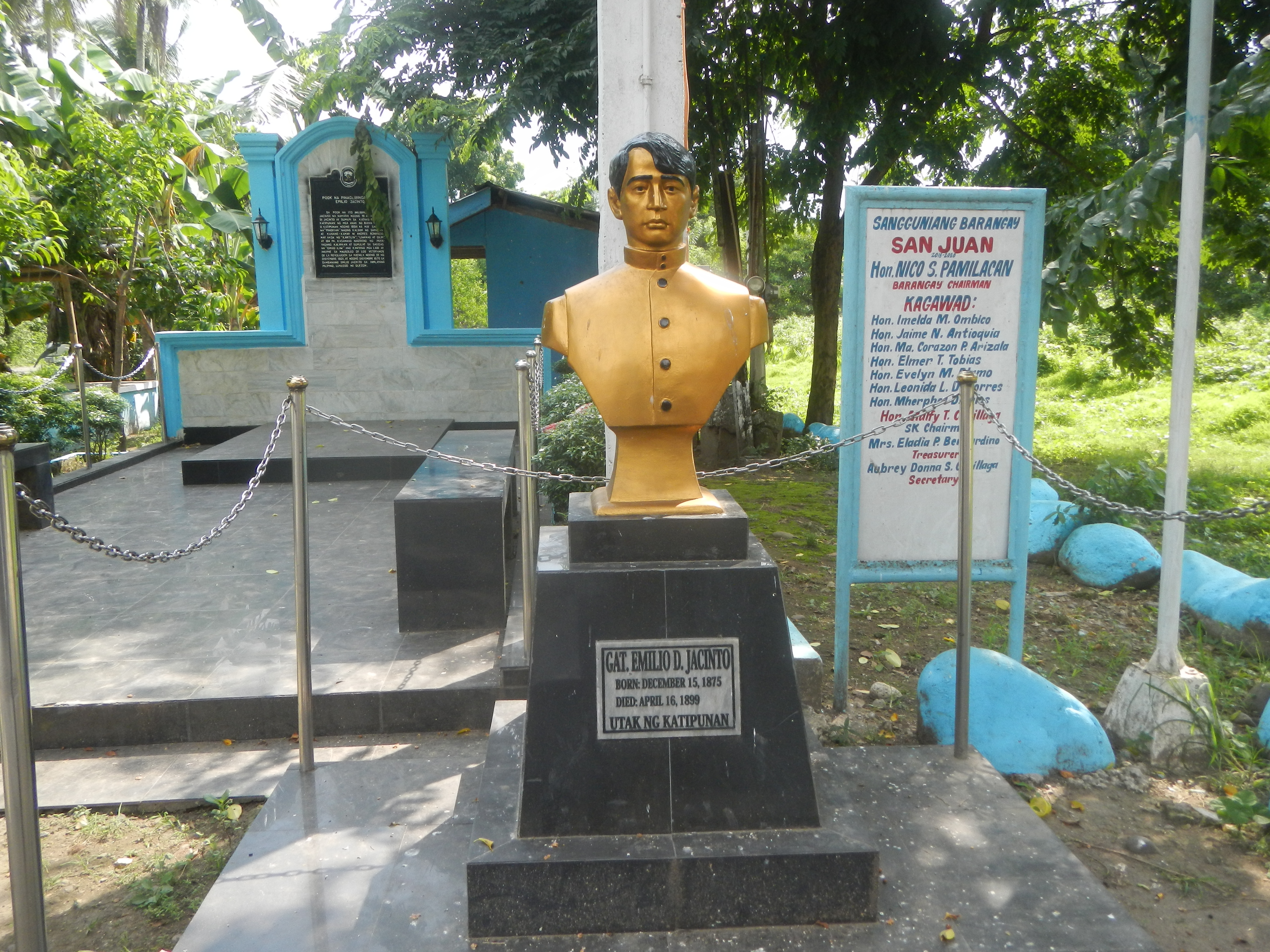
Emilio Jacinto Shrine Burial Site in Santa Cruz, Laguna

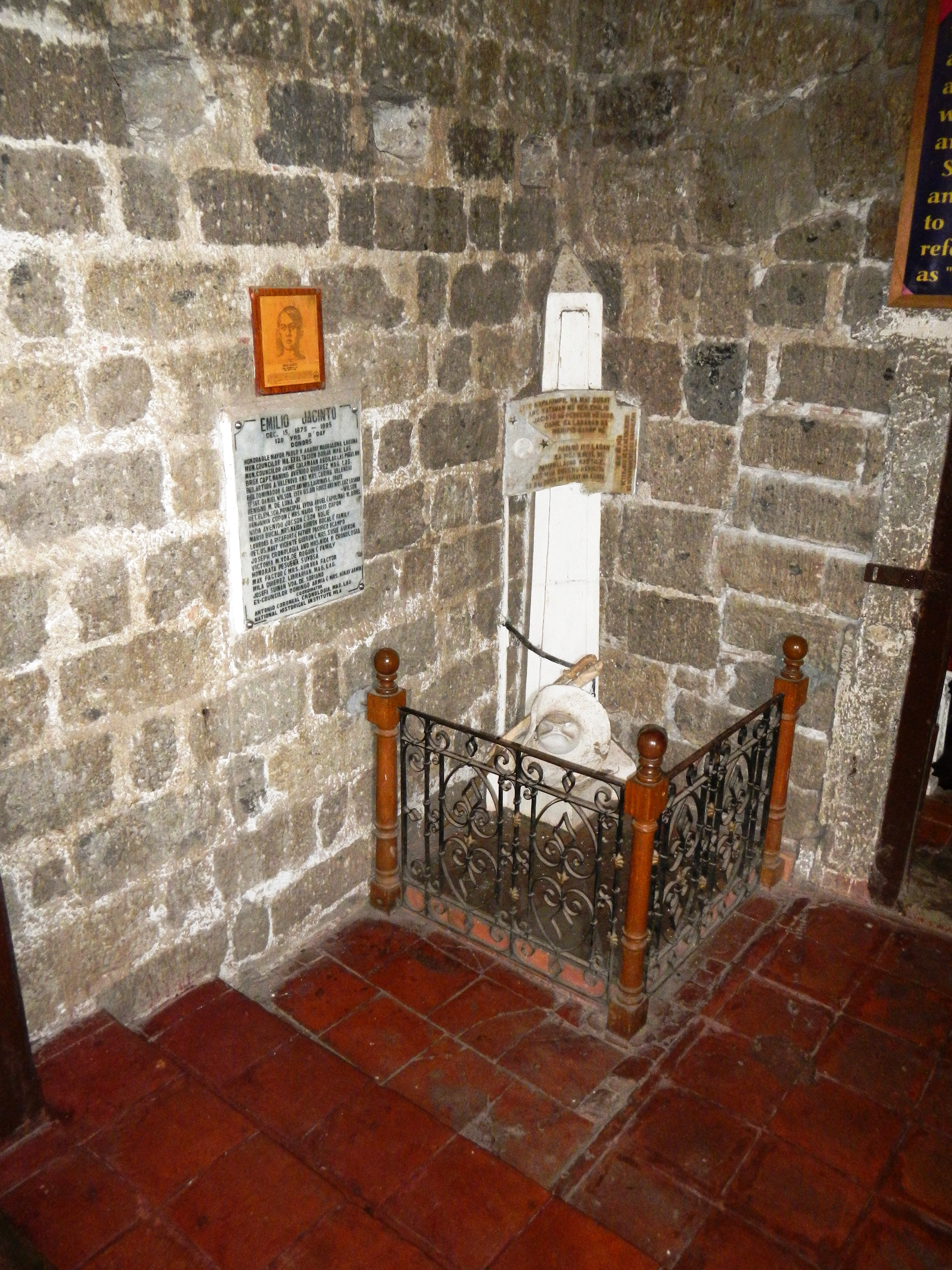
Marker at Santa Maria Magdalena Parish in Magdalena, Laguna, where he set up headquarters while recuperating from a gunshot wound

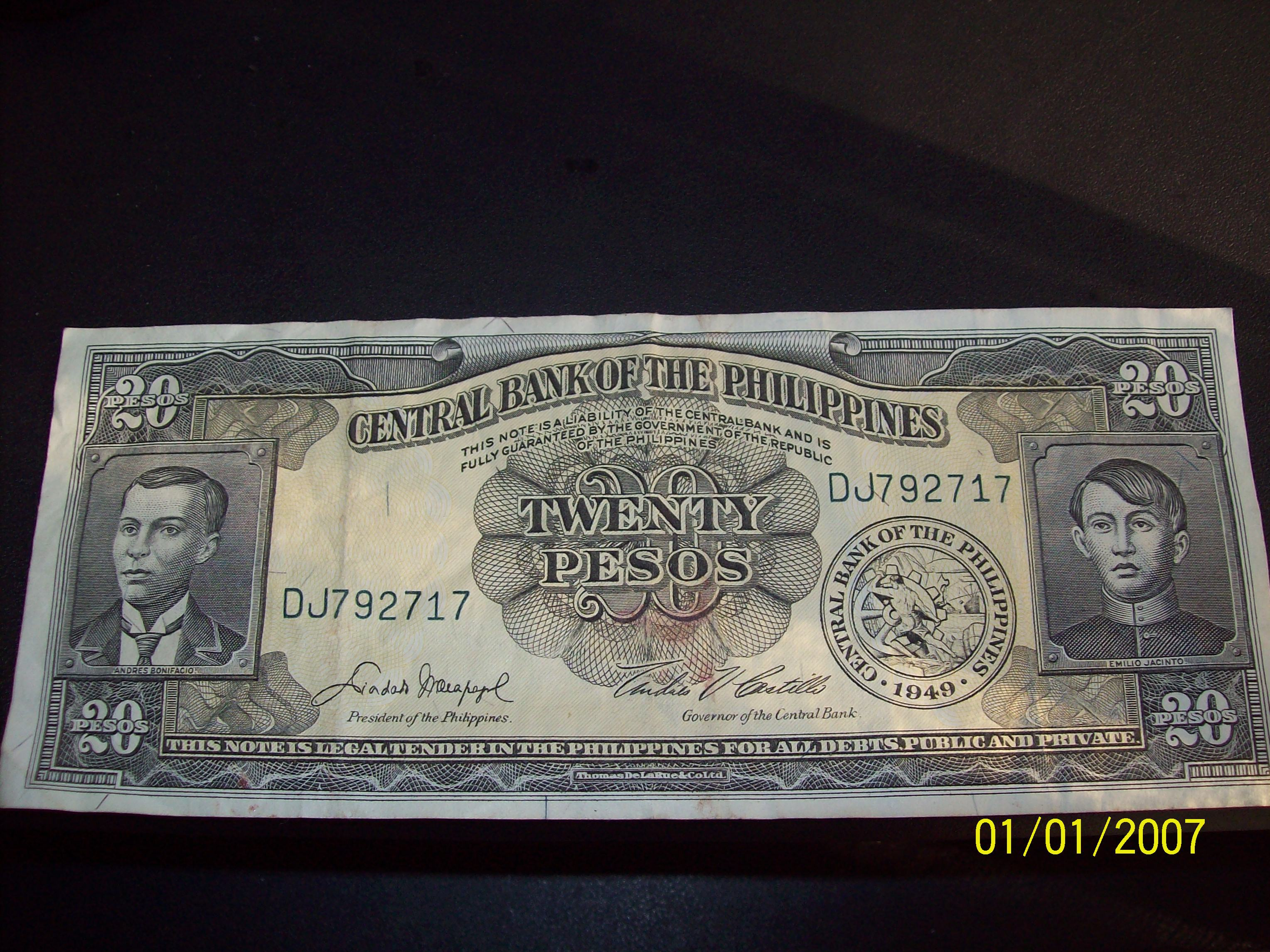
Old 20 peso bill that features Emilio Jacinto and Andres Bonifacio

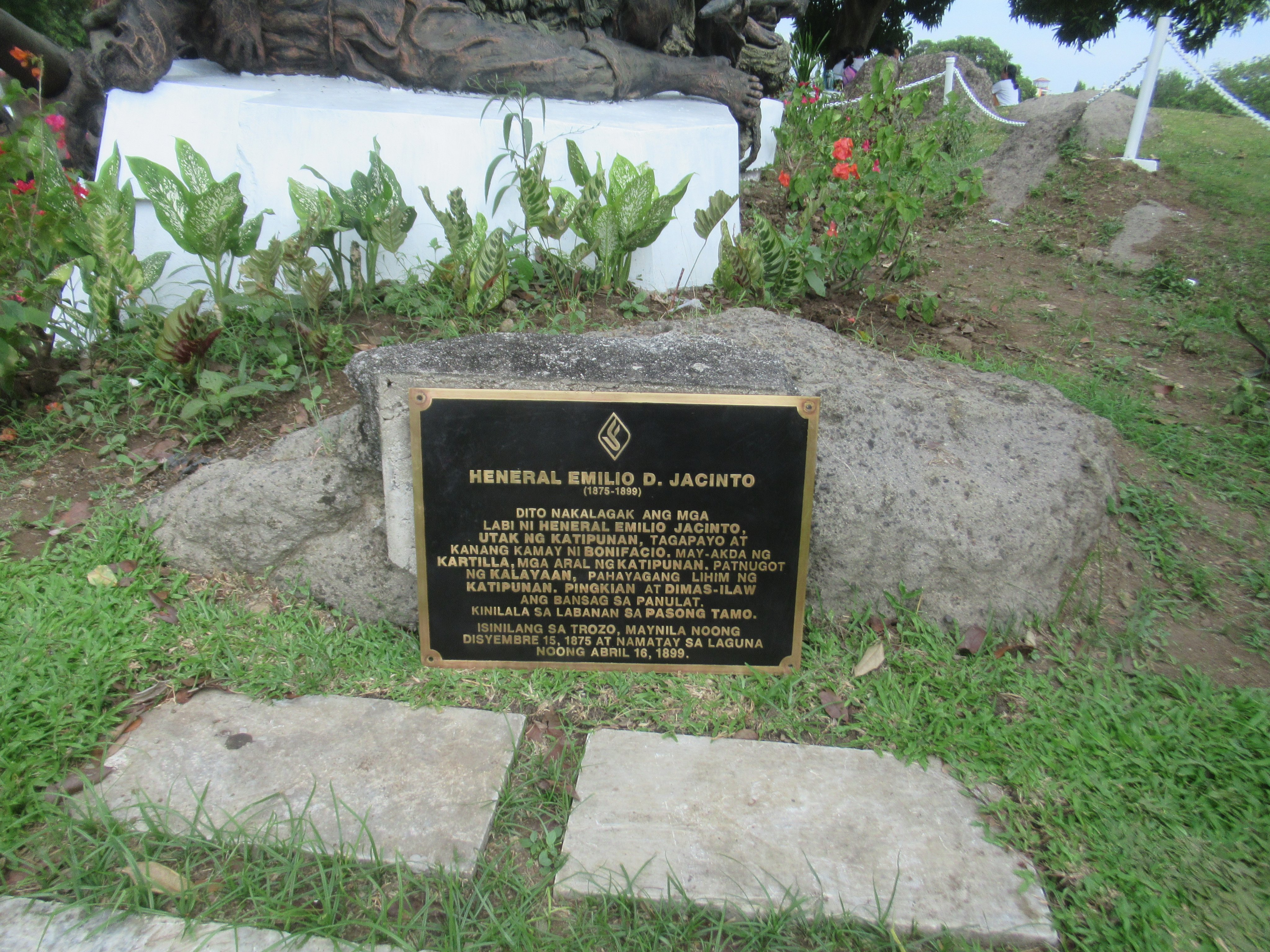
Jacinto's grave at the Himlayang Pilipino Memorial Park (Quezon City).

== Biography ==
Born in Tondo, Manila, Emilio Jacinto was proficient both in Spanish and Tagalog. He attended San Juan de Letran College, and later transferred to the University of Santo Tomas to study law. Manuel Quezon, Sergio Osmeña and Juan Sumulong were his classmates. He did not finish college and, at the age of 19, joined the secret society called Katipunan. He became the advisor on fiscal matters and secretary to Andrés Bonifacio. He was later known as Utak ng Katipunan (transl. Brain of Katipunan). He and Bonifacio also befriended Apolinario Mabini when they attempted to continue José Rizal's La Liga Filipina.

Jacinto also wrote for the Katipunan newspaper called Kalayaan. He wrote in the newspaper under the pen name "Dimasilaw", and used the alias "Pingkian" in the Katipunan. Jacinto was the author of the Kartilya ng Katipunan as well.

The Kartilya ng Katipunan (the by-laws or moral guide of the Katipunan) was written by Emilio Jacinto.

Emilio Jacinto, often called the “Brains of the Katipunan,” authored the Kartilya to serve as the ethical and moral code for members of the Kataas-taasan, Kagalang-galangang Katipunan ng mga Anak ng Bayan (KKK). It emphasized values such as equality, patriotism, honor, and love of country.

Although Andrés Bonifacio initially drafted a different set of rules (Dekalogo), Jacinto’s Kartilya was ultimately adopted as the official guide for the organization.

After Bonifacio's execution, Jacinto pressed on with the Katipunan's struggle. Like general Mariano Álvarez, he refused to join the forces of General Emilio Aguinaldo, the leader of the Katipunan's Magdalo faction. Jacinto lived in Laguna and also joined the militia fighting the Spaniards. Jacinto contracted malaria and died on April 16, 1899, in Brgy. Alipit, Santa Cruz, Laguna. His remains were initially buried in Brgy. San Juan, Santa Cruz, Laguna, and were transferred to the Manila North Cemetery a few years later and then transferred his remains at Himlayang Pilipino Memorial Park in Quezon City.

He was married to Catalina de Jesús, who was pregnant at the time of his death.

Catalina de Jesus, who was also known as "Aling Tinay," was a spiritual leader and mystic from the Philippines. She founded the religious organization called "Cofradia de San Jose."

== Tributes ==
In the 1970s, Jacinto's remains were transferred and enshrined at Himlayang Pilipino Memorial Park in Quezon City. At the shrine is a life-size bronze sculpture of a defiant Jacinto riding a horse during his days as a revolutionary. Another statue of Jacinto is located in Mehan Garden. Another monument of Jacinto was unveiled in the town plaza of Magdalena, Laguna on April 17, 2017.

Jacinto's likeness used to be featured on the old 20 peso bill that was circulated from 1949 to 1969, and also on the old 20 centavo coin.

== In popular culture ==
- Portrayed by Ariel Rivera in the 1995 Original Filipino Musical "1896" by the Philippine Educational Theater Education.
- Portrayed by Smokey Manaloto in 1995 TV series Bayani, in episode "Andres Bonifacio: KKK".
- Portrayed by Cris Villanueva in 1996 TV series Bayani, in 2 episodes.
- Portrayed by Alvin Aragon in official Music Video GMA Lupang Hinirang in 2010
- Portrayed by RJ Agustin in the 2013 TV series Katipunan.
- Portrayed by Joem Bascon in the 2014 film Bonifacio: Ang Unang Pangulo.
- Portrayed by Vic Robinson in the 2024 Original Filipino Musical "Pingkian" by Tanghalang Pilipino.
